= Christ Taking Leave of his Mother (Lotto) =

1521 painting by Lorenzo Lotto

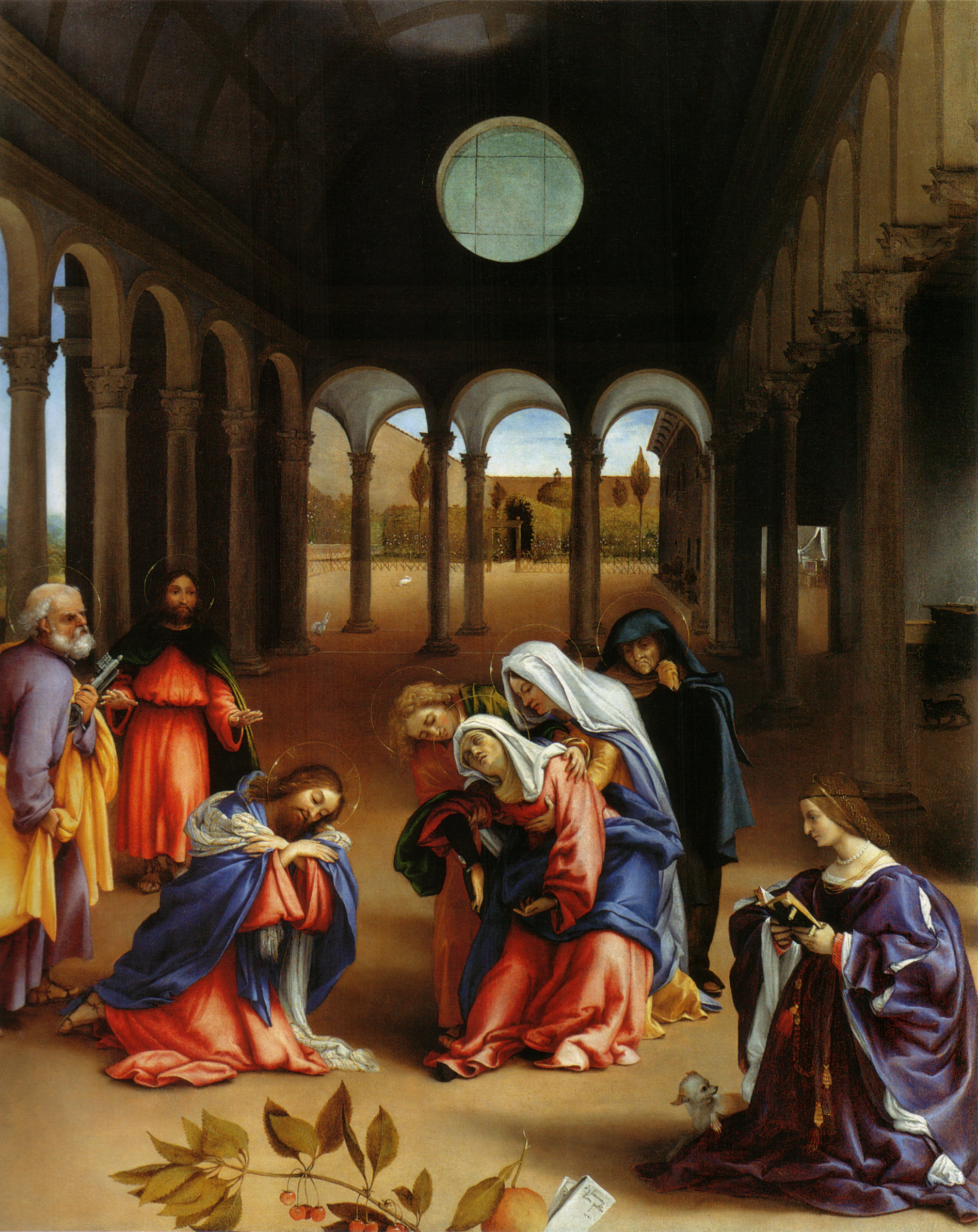
Christ Taking Leave of his Mother (1521) by Lorenzo Lotto

Christ Taking Leave of his Mother is an oil-on-canvas painting by the Italian Renaissance artist Lorenzo Lotto, dated to 1521 and now in the Gemäldegalerie, Berlin. It has several similarities with the small Christ Taking Leave of his Mother by Correggio now in London.

It is signed and dated "Laurentjo / Lotto Pictor / 1521", the same year as the artist's Santo Spirito Altarpiece and San Bernardino Altarpiece were created for Elisabetta Rota, a noblewoman from Bergamo who is shown at the bottom right of the painting. She was the wife of Domenico Tassi, who himself commissioned a St Jerome and a Nativity from Lotto – the latter shows a portrait of Tassi and it and the Berlin work probably originally formed a pair.

The scene of Christ saying farewell to the Virgin Mary before setting off for Jerusalem to be crucified is popular in devotional literature although it does not appear in the Gospels. The composition of these two figures is based on that of an Annunciation. Mary is supported by female saints and John the Apostle, whilst saints Peter and James the Great are shown to the left.
