= Crucifixion with Pietà (Lotto) =

Painting by Lorenzo Lotto

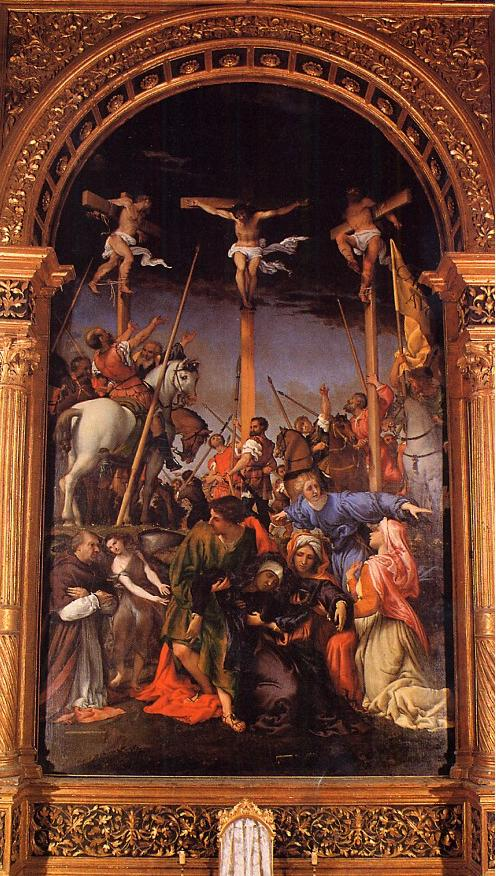
- Artist: Lorenzo Lotto
- Year: c. 1529-1534
- Medium: Oil on panel
- Location: Santa Maria della Pietà in Telusiano, Monte San Giusto

The Crucifixion with Pietà or Crucifixion (Italian: Crocifissione) is a painting by the Italian Renaissance painter Lorenzo Lotto, executed in 1529–1534 and housed in the church of Santa Maria della Pietà in Telusiano, Monte San Giusto, province of Macerata, region of Marche, Italy.

== History ==
The work was commissioned by Bishop Bonafede for the church, painted mainly in Venice, and placed in situ in the present frame circa 1534. Lotto was paid 100 gold florins and a quantity of olive oil. The signature on the painting was not discovered until 1831.

The scene depicts three levels:

- Christ and the two robbers are crucified against a darkening sky.
- A disorganized rabble of soldiers, some on horseback, mill below the crosses, with multiple askance spears. It is claimed that the central figure facing the viewer at the base of Christ's cross is a self-portrait of Lotto himself.
- The lowest scene depicts the Pietà, with the Virgin Mary fainting into the arms of St John, while an wrought Mary Magdalen in a blue dress embraces the scene. In the corner is the kneeling donor Bishop, who is being exposed the scene by an angel.
