= Madonna and Child with Two Donors =

Madonna and Child with Two Donors is the name of the following paintings:

- Madonna and Child with Two Donors (Lotto), a c. 1533–1535 oil-on-canvas painting by Lorenzo Lotto
- Madonna and Child with Two Donors (van Dyck), a 1630 painting by Anthony van Dyck
