= Madonna and Child with St Peter Martyr and a Donor =

Painting by Lorenzo Lotto

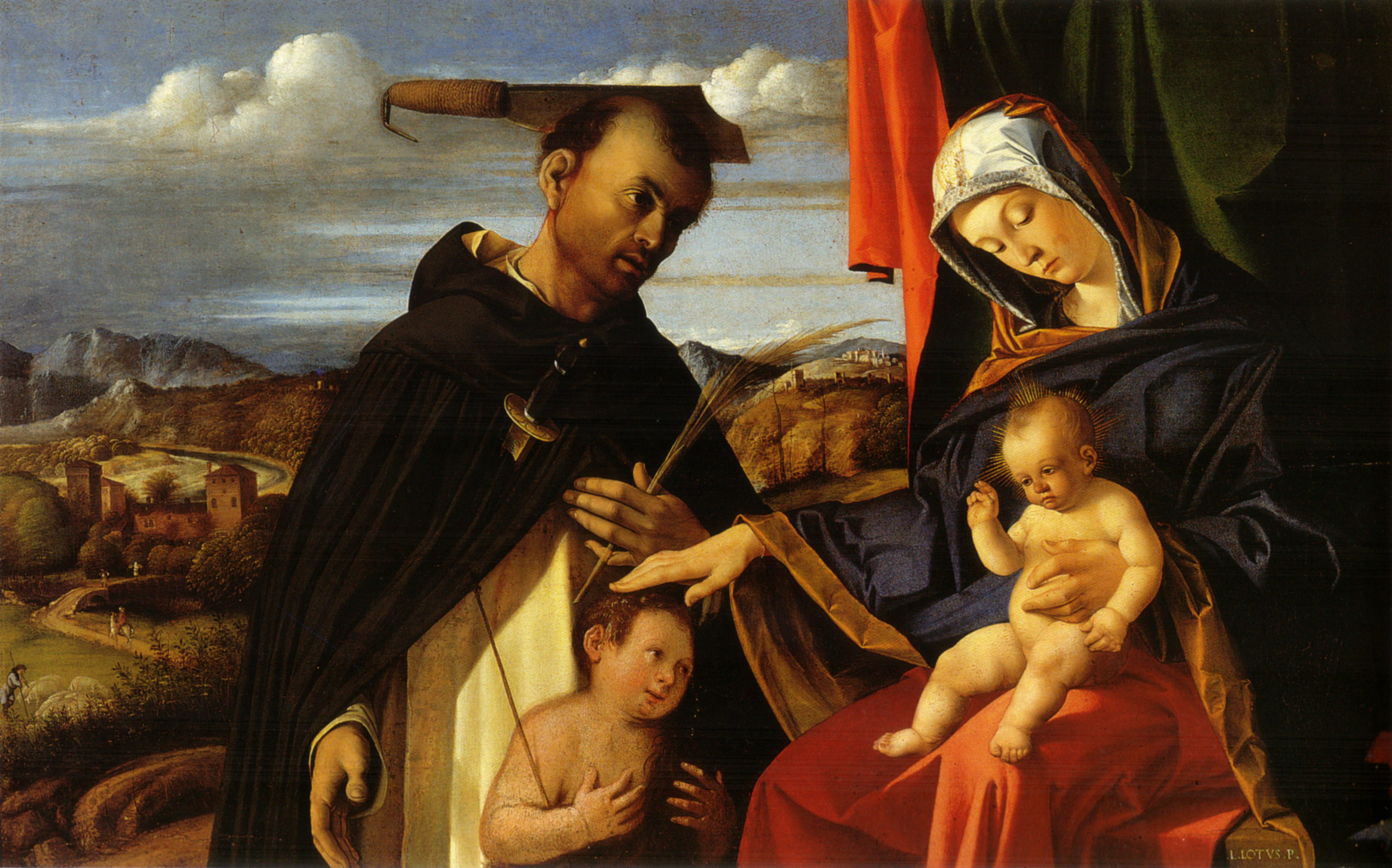
- Artist: Lorenzo Lotto
- Year: 1503
- Medium: Oil on panel
- Dimensions: 55 cm × 88 cm (22 in × 35 in)
- Location: National Museum of Capodimonte, Naples

Madonna and Child with St Peter Martyr and a Donor is a 1503 oil-on-panel painting by Lorenzo Lotto, the first known work by the artist, painted early in his time in Treviso. The two figures to the left are Peter Martyr and a donor or the infant John the Baptist. Its date is inscribed on the reverse as "1503 adì 20 septembris" and – although it is not in Lotto's handwriting as seen in documents – it is a 16th-century hand and therefore accepted.

It was probably commissioned by bishop Bernardo de' Rossi. Art historians theorise that it was an ex voto for escaping a murder attempt planned for 29 September 1503. It was probably brought to Parma by Rossi when he fled there in 1524 and later entered the Farnese collection, in whose inventories it first appeared in 1650. It was moved to Naples in 1760 and is now in the National Museum of Capodimonte in Naples.
