= Presentation in the Temple (Lotto) =

Painting by Lorenzo Lotto

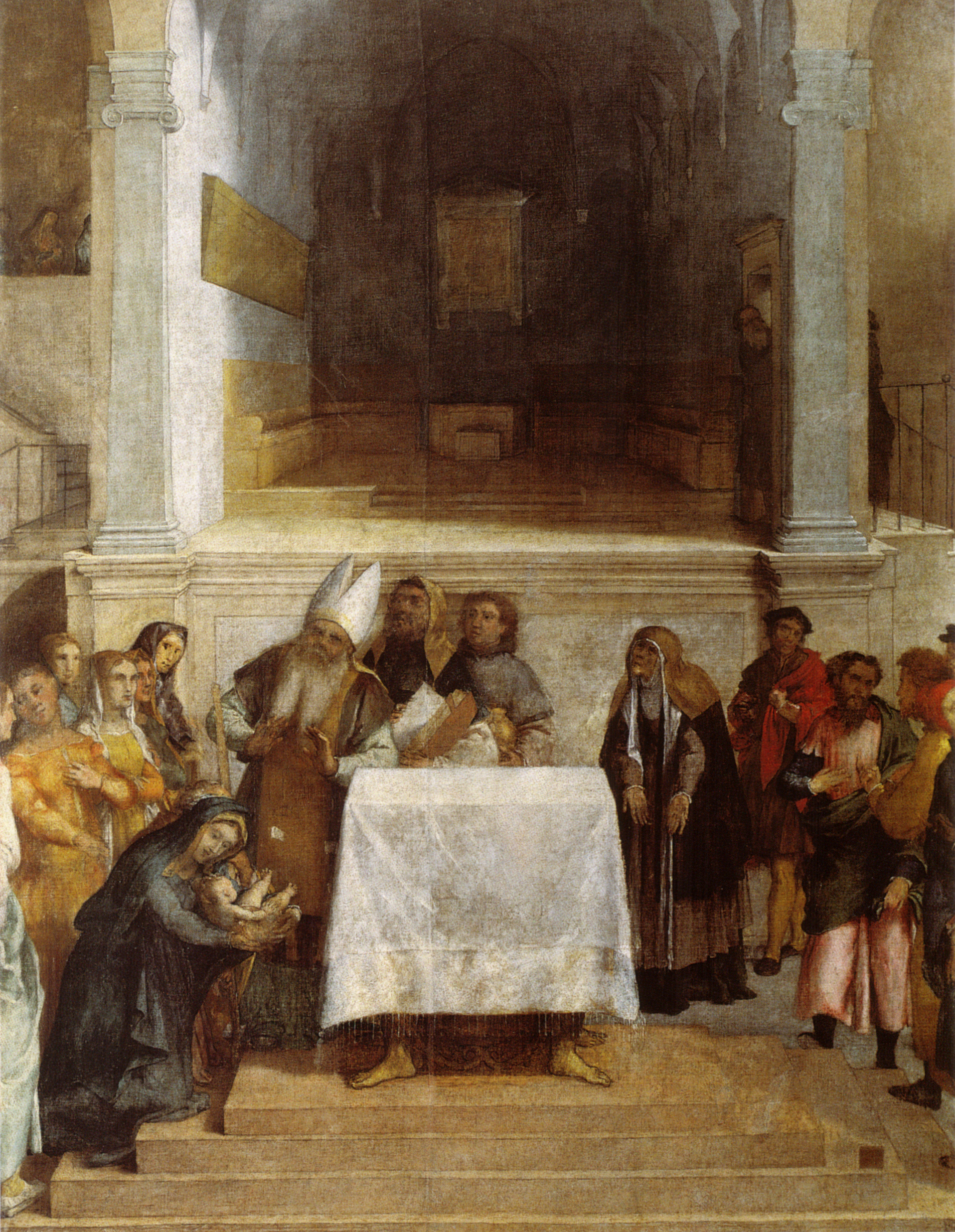
Presentation in the Temple (c. 1552–1556) by Lorenzo Lotto

Presentation in the Temple is an oil-on-canvas painting of the presentation of Jesus at the Temple by Lorenzo Lotto, created c. 1552–1556, now in the Museo pinacoteca della Santa Casa in Loreto. It is recognised as Lotto's last surviving autograph work – he had become an oblate at the Holy House of Loreto and produced this and several other large canvases for the choir of the church there. Vasari's Lives of the Artists mentions Lotto planning a series of scenes from Christ's childhood for Loreto, of which Presentation is thought to be one.
