= Christ Carrying the Cross (Lotto) =

1526 painting by Lorenzo Lotto

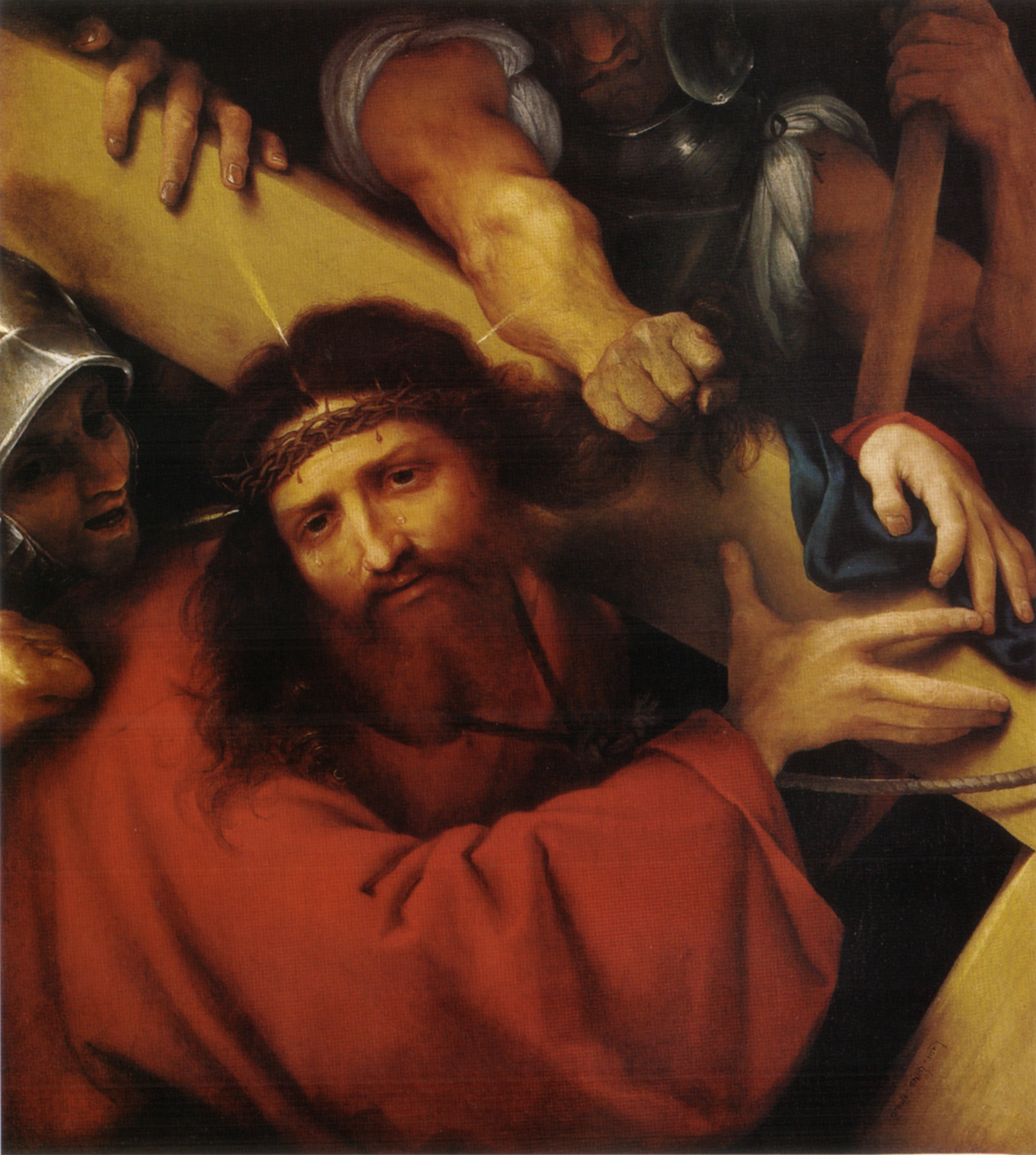
- Artist: Lorenzo Lotto
- Year: 1526
- Medium: Oil on canvas
- Dimensions: .66 m × .925 m (26 in × 36.4 in)
- Location: Louvre, Paris
- Accession: RF 1982 50
- Website: collections.louvre.fr/en/ark:/53355/cl010065466

Christ Bearing the Cross is an oil-on-canvas painting by Lorenzo Lotto, painted in 1526 and now in the Louvre. It is signed and dated "Laur. Lotus / 1526" on the crossbeam of the cross at the lower right.

It shows the influence of his stay in Venice. Historical sources mention two works on this subject by Lotto in Venetian collections. One of these was in the house of the Bergamo-born nobleman Jacopo Pighetti – this is most probably the one now in the Louvre. It was taken to Rome before being sold in France, and entered the Louvre collection in 1982.
