= St Antoninus Giving Alms =

Painting by Lorenzo Lotto

- Elemosina di sant'Antonino (Italian)
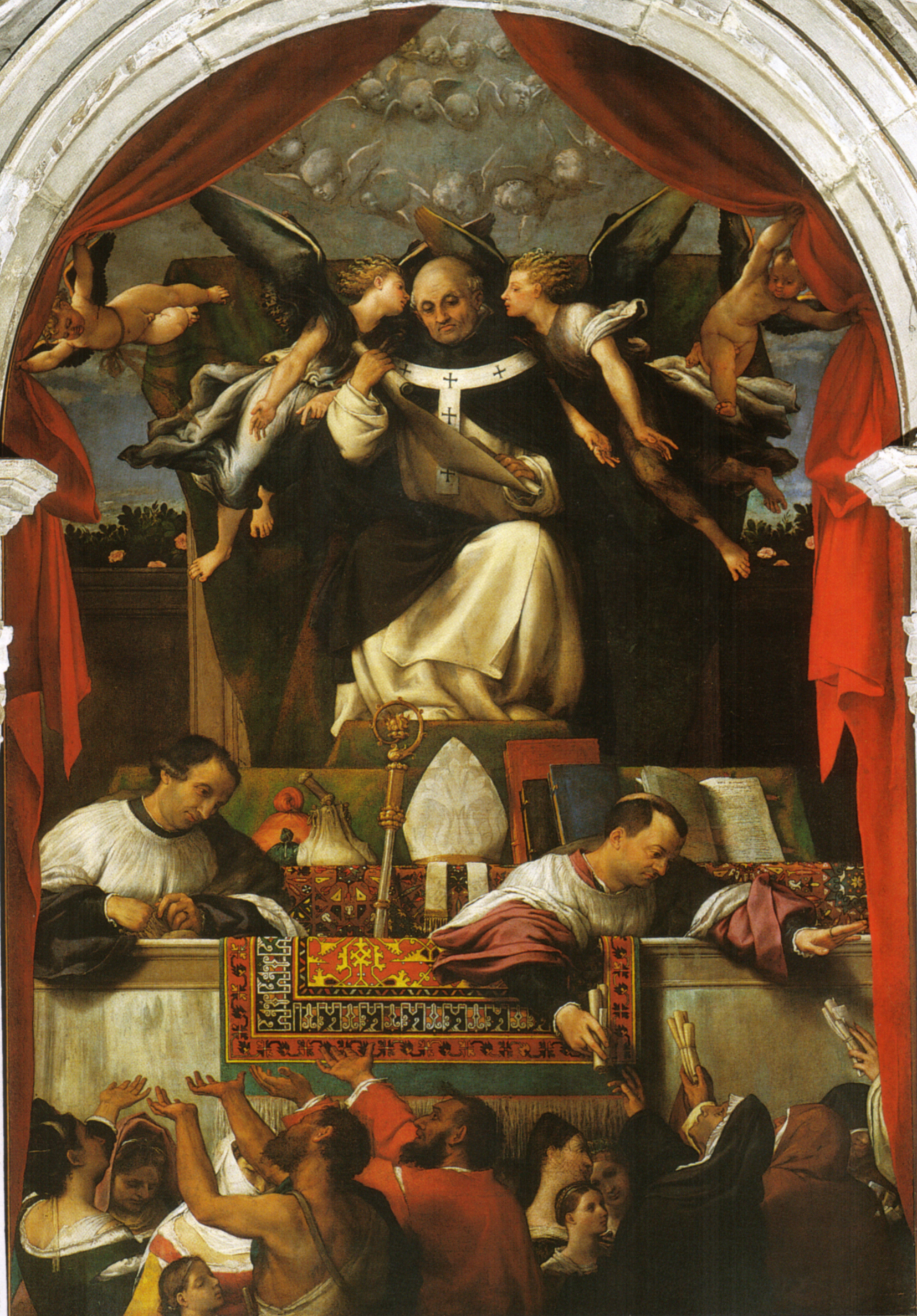
- Artist: Lorenzo Lotto
- Year: c. 1540–1542
- Medium: Oil on canvas
- Dimensions: 332 cm × 235 cm (131 in × 93 in)
- Location: Santi Giovanni e Paolo, Venice

St Antoninus Giving Alms or The Alms of St Antoninus is an oil-on-canvas painting by the Italian artist Lorenzo Lotto, created c. 1540–1542. It depicts Archbishop Antoninus of Florence giving alms as an allegorical ideal for bureaucratic charity. The painting is now displayed in the Basilica dei Santi Giovanni e Paolo in Venice.

== History ==
Lotto kept a detailed account book, which on 8 December 1540 mentions the arrival in his studio of a canvas already nailed to a frame. He removed and replaced that frame and support. From this fact, art historians have hypothesized that the commission for the Antoninus was originally signed around 1525 and was the reason for Lotto's move from Bergamo to Venice, where he stayed in the Dominican monastery.

His work on the painting may have been interrupted in July 1526, when the artist left the monastery in disgust at certain slanders circulating about him. He eventually returned to the monastery and renewed the commission—his will of 1546 shows him wishing to be buried in its cemetery and in return renouncing part of the fee for the painting. The work went wholly unmentioned in Venice at the time of its production due to the intelligentsia's hostility to Lotto and preference for Titian and his followers.

== Description and style ==
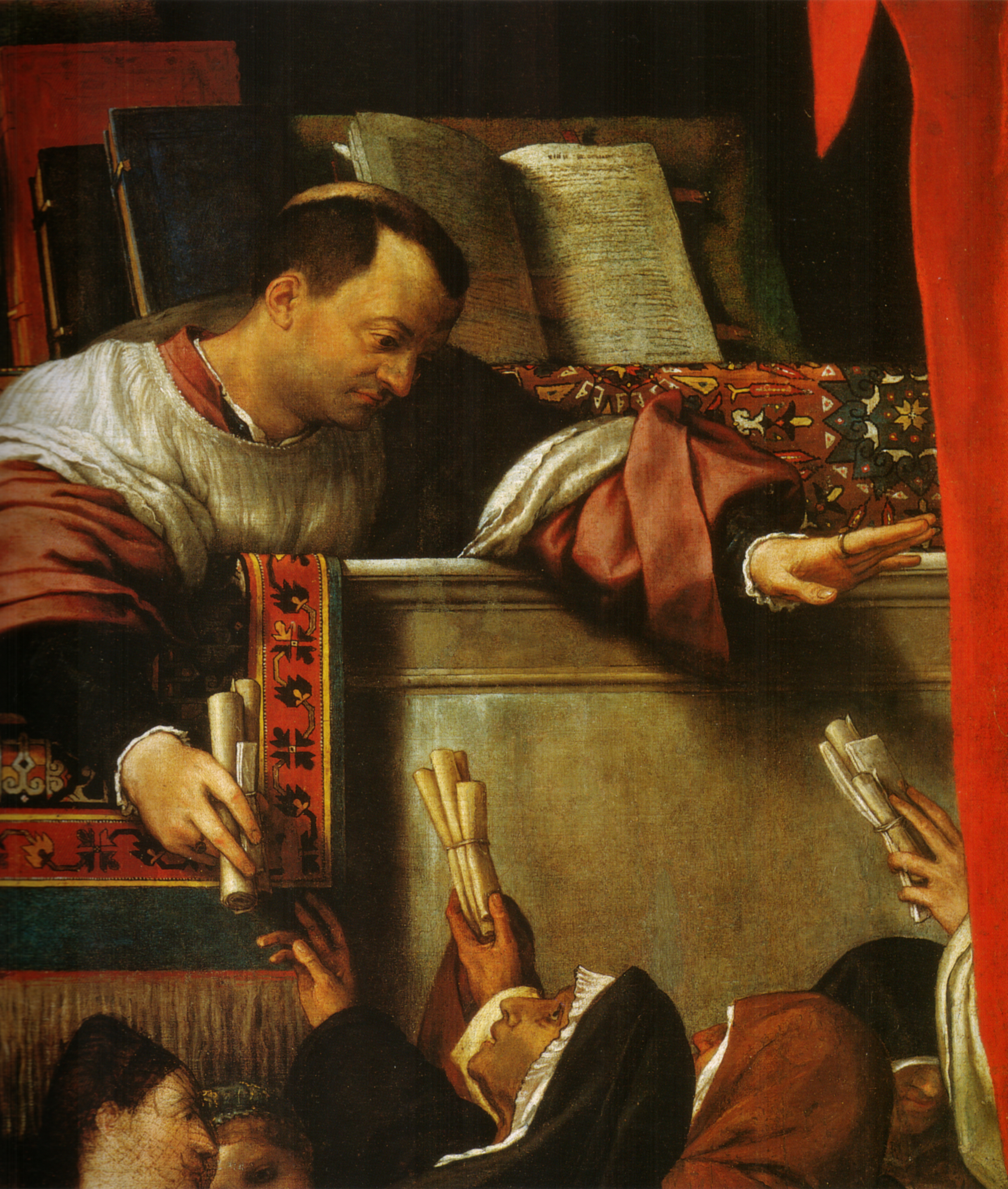
Detail of the painting

The painting, dedicated to archbishop Antoninus of Florence, has a very original composition.

Behind a red curtain pushed aside by little angels, the scene of almsgiving is depicted in three registers. The saint, who in 1442 founded a charitable brotherhood for aiding the poor, is placed on a throne in the higher part of the painting. He reads a scroll, possibly a plea, and listens to the advice of two angels. Below him, two deacons look over a balcony with a Persian carpet that decorates the balustrade. Behind them is depicted a kind of still life, with the mitre of the archbishop, the pastoral, bags, and books.

Of the two assistants, one takes the supplications of the poor in the lower register. He is depicted at half figure, with a calming outstretched hand. The assistant at left takes money from a bag and below him the poor extend their hands to receive it from him. The gestures give a sense of order and calm. In the group of supplicants, there are widows, orphans, and beggars, some described with vivid realism. One of the supplicants — "a bearded, red-robed man — may well be a self-portrait of the painter." In the Lotto's diary, it is in fact recorded that he took many life studies of poor people in the summer of 1541. In his composition, Lotto creates a model for bureaucratic charity—with the saint scrupulously reading requests, receiving guidance from the angels at his ears, and then giving instructions to those below.

== Bibliography ==
- Pirovano, Carlo (2002). Lotto (in Italian). Milano: Electa. ISBN 88-435-7550-3.
- Roberta D'Adda, Lotto, Skira, Milano 2004.
