= Madonna and Child with Saint Catherine and Saint James =

Painting by Lorenzo Lotto

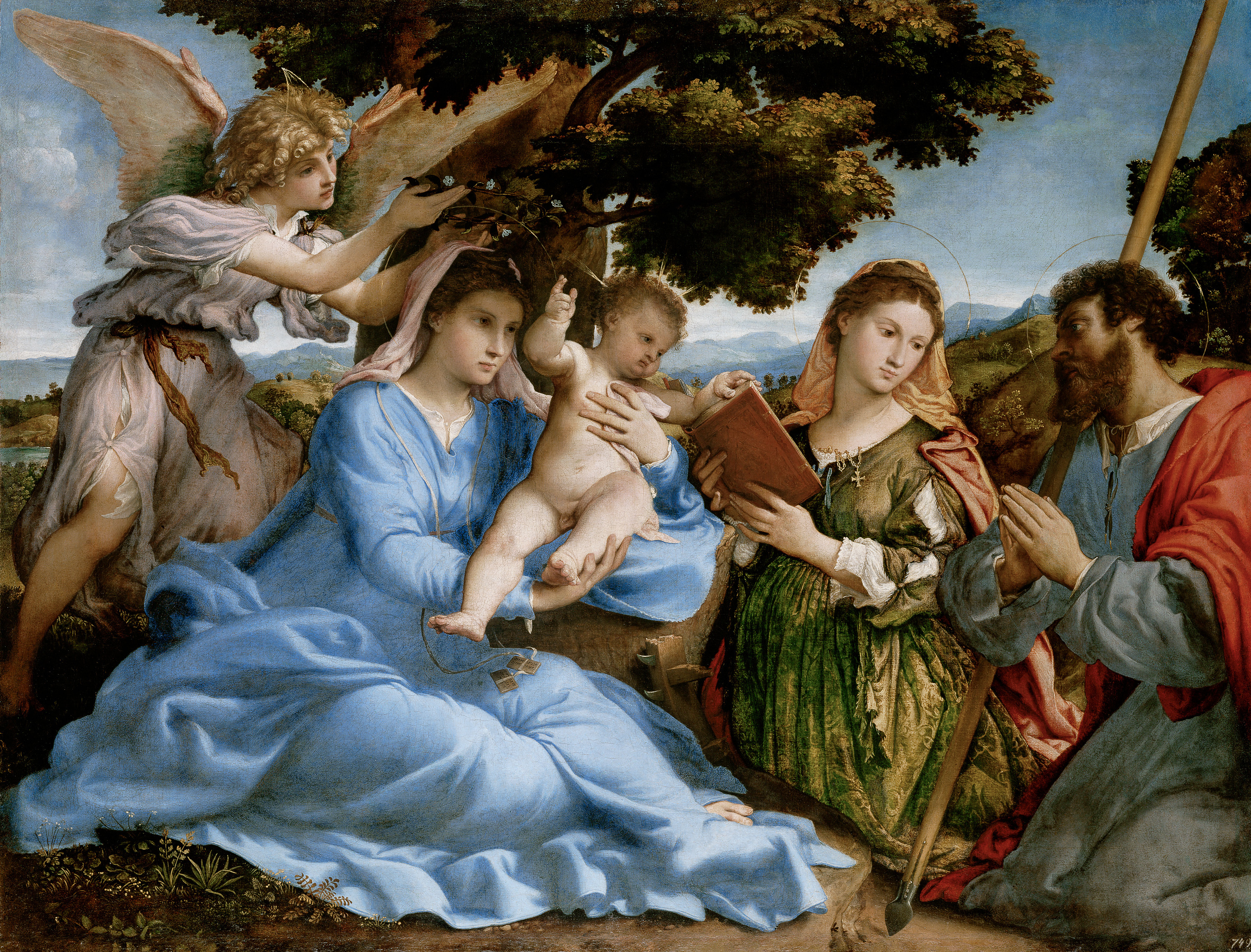
- Artist: Lorenzo Lotto
- Year: c. 1527
- Medium: Oil on canvas
- Dimensions: 117 cm × 152 cm (46 in × 60 in)
- Location: Kunsthistorisches Museum

Madonna and Child with Saint Catherine and Saint James is an oil-on-canvas painting by Lorenzo Lotto, created c. 1527, now in the Kunsthistorisches Museum in Vienna. To the right are the two martyr saints Catherine of Alexandria and James the Great.

The first written mention of the painting dates to 1660, in Boschini's Carta del navigar pittoresco la citò, which called it "splendid... well-thought-out and memorable". The painting was then already in the Habsburg collections. Boschini misattributed it to Palma il Vecchio, but it is now thought to be by Lotto using a composition by Palma. It was probably produced as a private (rather than church) commission just after Lotto's arrival in Venice.
