= Portrait of a Young Man with a Book (Lotto) =

c. 1525 painting by Lorenzo Lotto

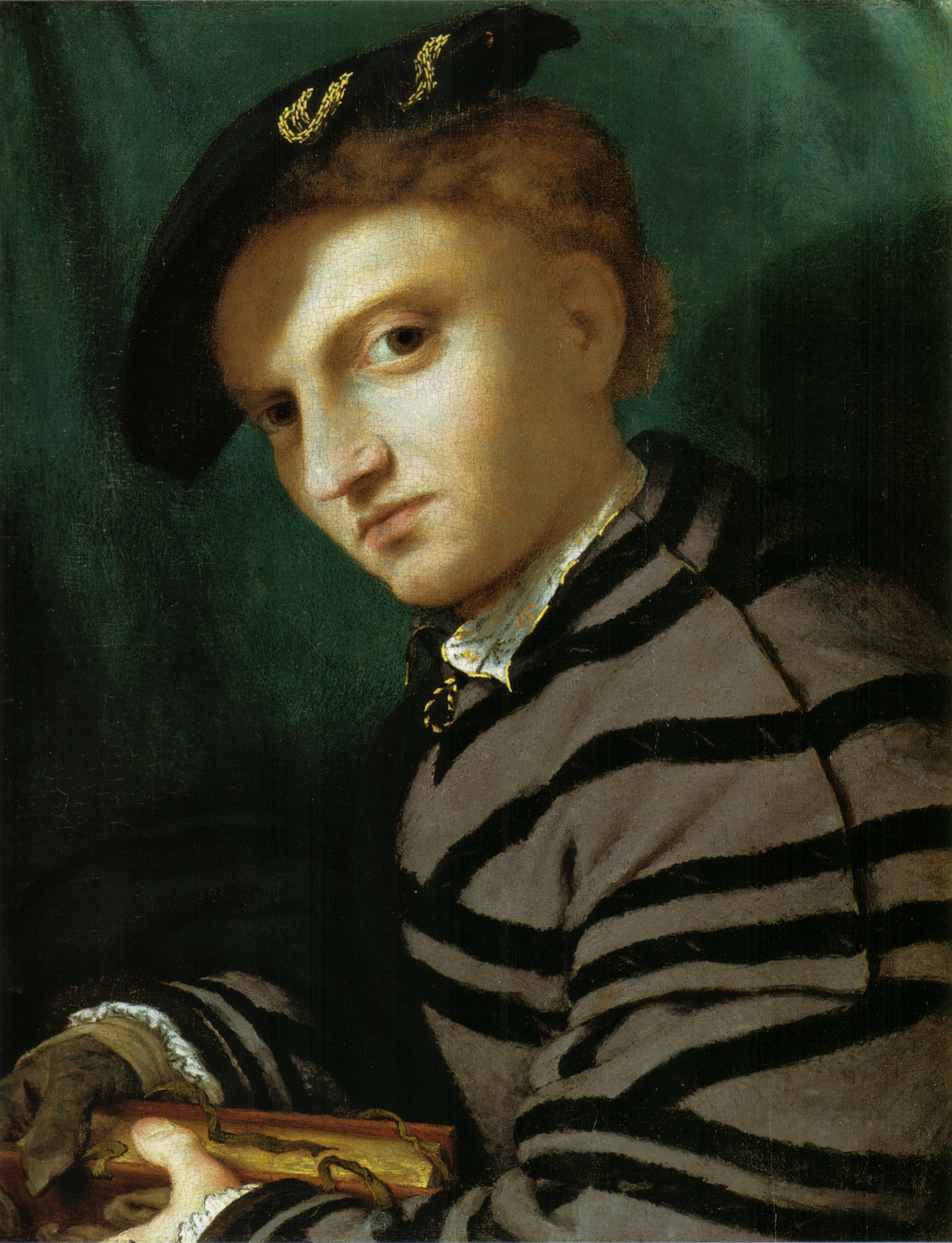
Portrait of a Young Man with a Book (c. 1526) by Lorenzo Lotto

Portrait of a Young Man with a Book is an oil-on-panel painting by the Italian Renaissance artist Lorenzo Lotto, now in the Pinacoteca del Castello Sforzesco in Milan, to which it was bequeathed in 1876. At that time its artist was unknown. It is dated to between the end of Lotto's time in Bergamo and his early years in Venice, that is between 1524 and 1527, and more specifically to around 1526.
