= Portrait of Brother Gregorio Belo of Vicenza =

1547 painting by Lorenzo Lotto

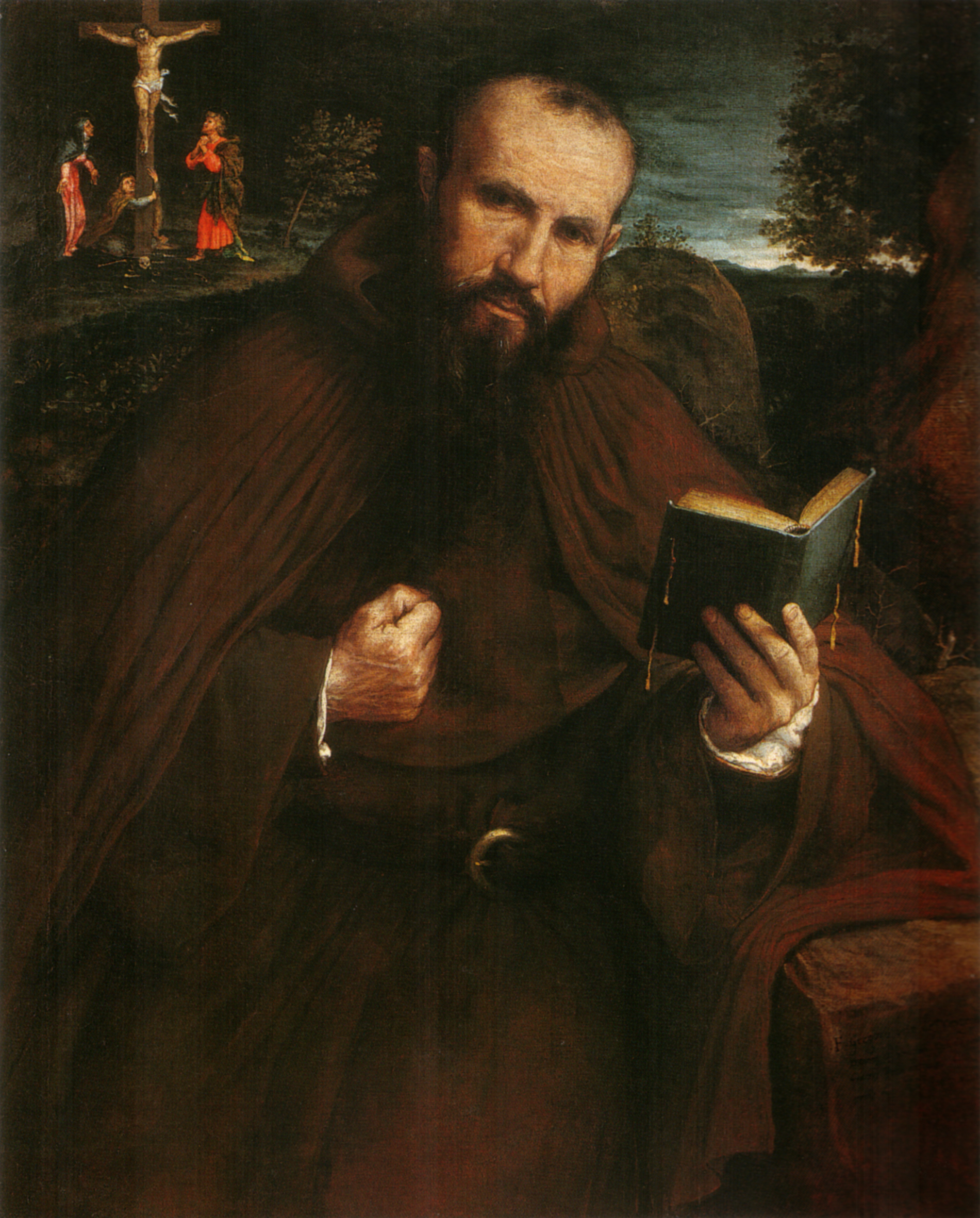
Portrait of Brother Gregorio Belo of Vicenza (1547) by Lorenzo Lotto

Portrait of Brother Gregorio Belo of Vicenza is a 1547 oil-on-canvas painting by the Italian High Renaissance artist Lorenzo Lotto, now in the Metropolitan Museum of Art in New York. It is inscribed bottom right "F. Gregorr belo de Vicentia / eremite in Hieronimi Ordinis beati / fratri Petris de Pisis Anno / etatis eius LV, M.D.XLVII". Its subject was a Hieronymite monk and so the image's iconography draws on that of the penitent St Jerome.

It is recorded in Lotto's own commonplace book as commissioned on 9 December 1546 by its subject and completed in October 1547. Johann Matthias von der Schulenburg acquired it in Venice in 1738 for 26 zecchini as a work by Paolo Veronese and it remained in his family until being sold to its present owner in 1965. It was only correctly attributed to Lotto in a post-1924 catalogue of the Schulenburg family collections.
