= Portrait of a Young Man (Lotto, Uffizi) =

Painting by Lorenzo Lotto

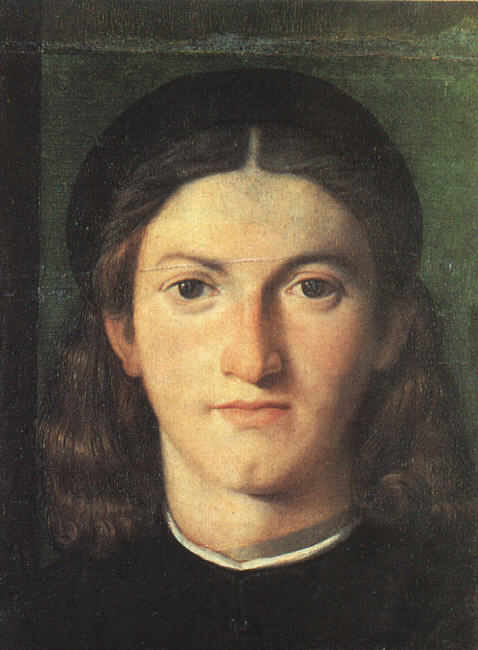
- Artist: Lorenzo Lotto
- Year: c. 1506
- Medium: Oil on panel
- Dimensions: 29 cm × 23 cm (11 in × 9.1 in)
- Location: Uffizi Gallery, Florence

The Portrait of a Young Man is an oil-on-panel painting by the Italian Renaissance painter Lorenzo Lotto, executed ca. 1506 and housed in the Uffizi Gallery, Florence, Italy.

The work was part of cardinal Leopoldo de' Medici's collection, after he had bought it from the Cornaro family. In a 1675 inventory it is mentioned as a Raphael work, and was associated with Lotto only in 1910.

== Sources ==
- Pirovano, Carlo (2002). Lotto. Milan: Electa.
