= Lorenzo Lotto =

Italian painter (c. 1480–1556/57)

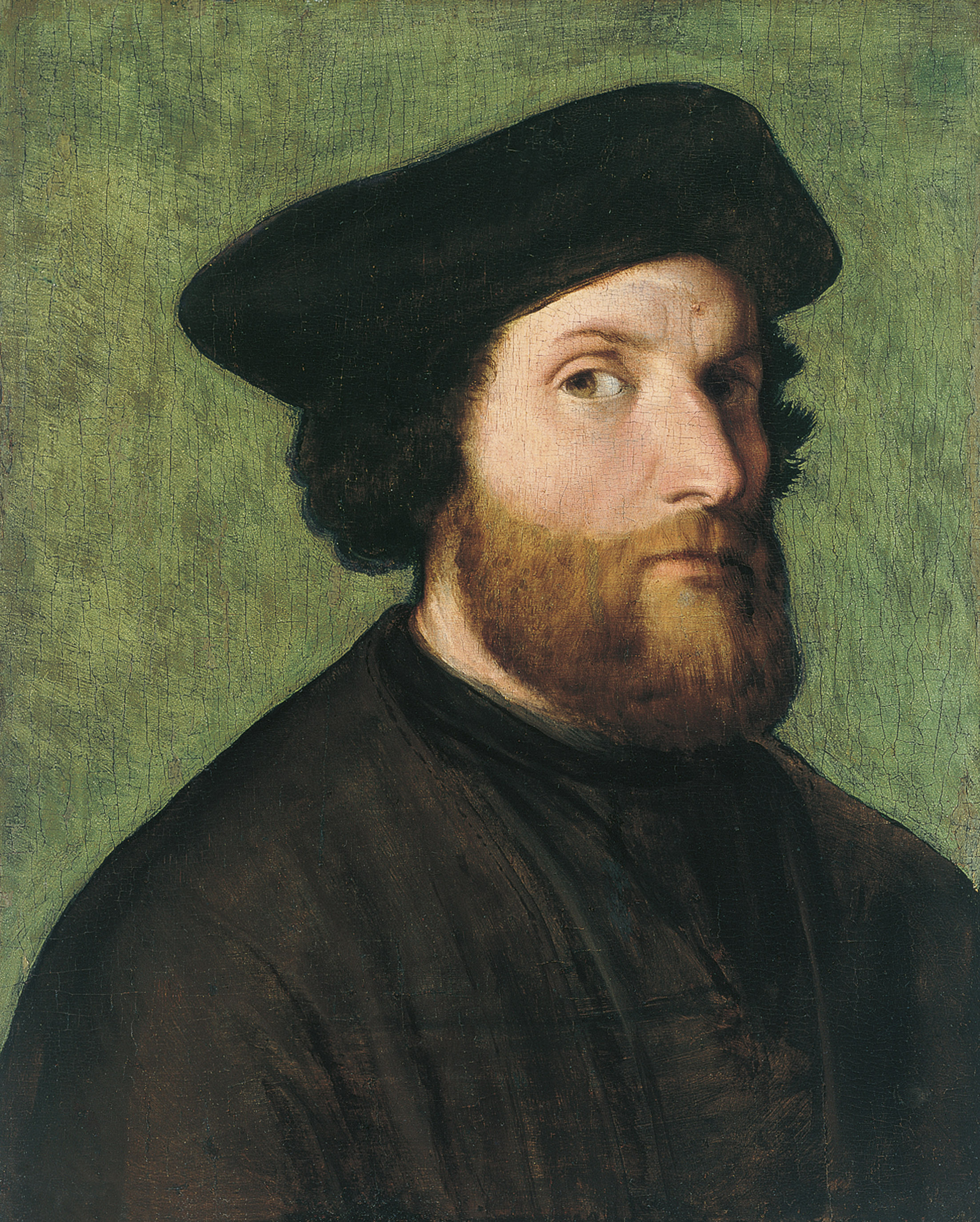
- Possible self-portrait, attributed to Lorenzo Lotto, 1540s, Thyssen-Bornemisza Museum
- Born: Lorenzo Lotto c. 1480; Venice, Italy
- Died: 1556/57; Loreto, Marche, Italy
- Known for: Painting
- Notable work: Polyptych of Saint Domenico
- Movement: High Renaissance

Signature
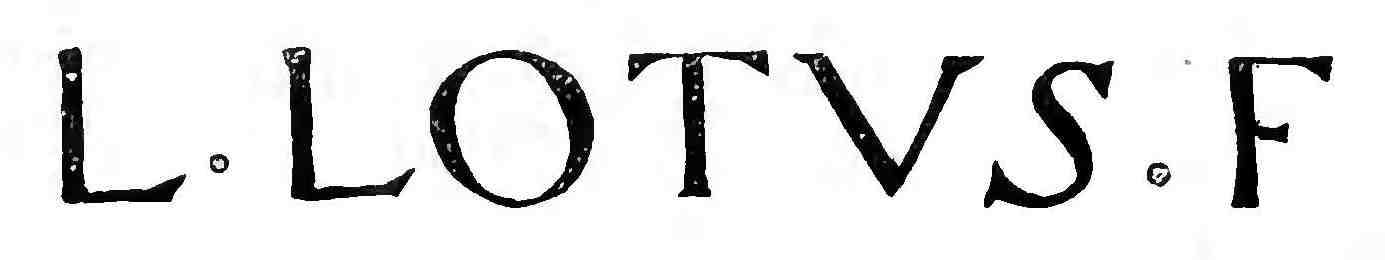

Lorenzo Lotto (c. 1480 – 1556/57) was an Italian Renaissance painter, draughtsman, and illustrator, traditionally placed in the Venetian school, though much of his career was spent in other north Italian cities. He painted mainly altarpieces, religious subjects and portraits. He was active during the High Renaissance and the first half of the Mannerist period, but his work maintained a generally similar High Renaissance style throughout his career, although his nervous and eccentric posings and distortions represented a transitional stage to the Florentine and Roman Mannerists.

== Overview ==
During his lifetime Lotto was a well-respected painter and certainly popular in Northern Italy; he is traditionally included in the Venetian School, but his independent career actually places him outside the Venetian art scene. He was certainly not as highly regarded in Venice as in the other towns where he worked, for he had a stylistic individuality, even an idiosyncratic style (although it fits within the parametres of High Renaissance painting), and, after his death, he gradually became neglected and then almost forgotten. This oblivion could be attributed to the fact that his works now remain in lesser known churches or in provincial museums.

== Biography ==
Born in Venice, he worked in Treviso (1503–1506); in the Marche (1506–1508); in Rome (1508–1510); in Bergamo (1513–1525); in Venice (1525–1549); in Ancona (1549), and finally, as a Franciscan lay brother, in Loreto (1549–1556).

=== Apprenticeship ===
Little is known of his training. As a Venetian he was influenced by Giovanni Bellini as he had a good knowledge of contemporary Venetian painting. Though Bellini was doubtless not his teacher, the influence is clear in his early painting Virgin and Child with St. Jerome (1506; National Gallery of Scotland, Edinburgh). However, in his portraits and in his early painting Allegory of Virtue and Vice (1505; National Gallery of Art, Washington), he shows the influence of Giorgione's Naturalism. As he grew older his style changed, perhaps evolving, from a detached Giorgionesque classicism, to a more vibrant dramatic setpiece, more reminiscent of his contemporary from Parma, Correggio.

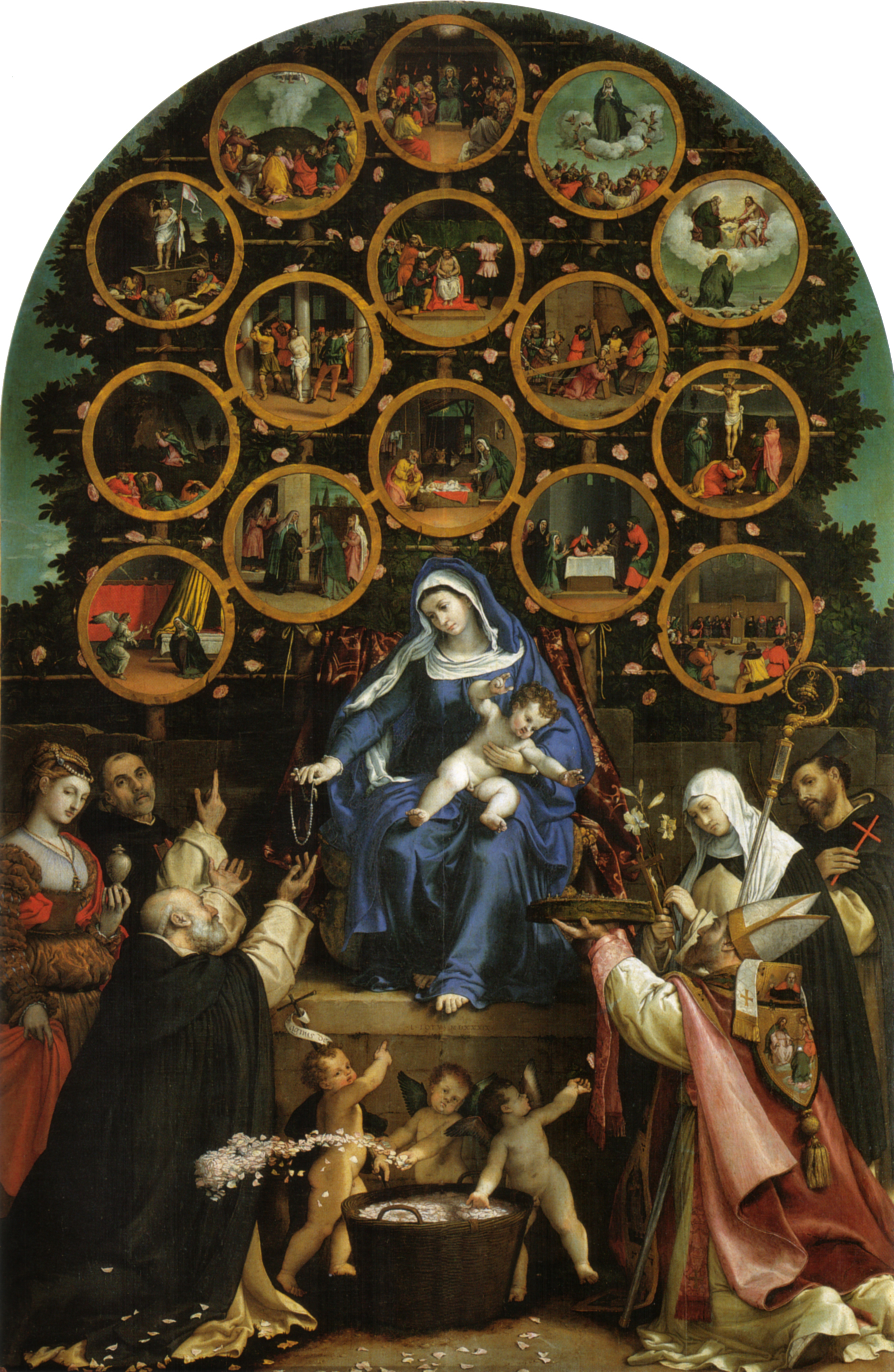
Madonna of the Rosary (1539), oil on canvas (church of San Domenico, Cingoli)

=== Treviso (1503–1506) ===
Lotto soon left Venice, because there the competition for a young painter would have been too great, with established names such as Giorgione, Palma the Elder and certainly with Titian. Nevertheless, Giorgio Vasari mentions in the third part of his book Vite that Lotto was a friend of Palma the Elder. In Treviso, a prospering town within the domain of the republic of Venice, he came under the patronage of bishop Bernardo de' Rossi. The already mentioned painting Allegory of Virtue and Vice was intended as an allegorical cover of his portrait (1505) of the bishop (now in National Museum of Capodimonte in Naples), who had survived an assassination attempt. The painting St. Jerome in the Desert (1500 or 1506; Louvre, Paris) shows his youthful inexperience as a draughtsman, however the dramatic rocky landscape is accentuated by the red garment of the saint, while at the same time giving an early impression of his skill as a miniaturist. He painted his first altarpieces for the parish church San Cristina al Tiverone (1505) and the baptistery of the Cathedral of Asolo (1506), both still on display in those churches.

=== Recanati (1506–1508) and Rome (1508–1510) ===
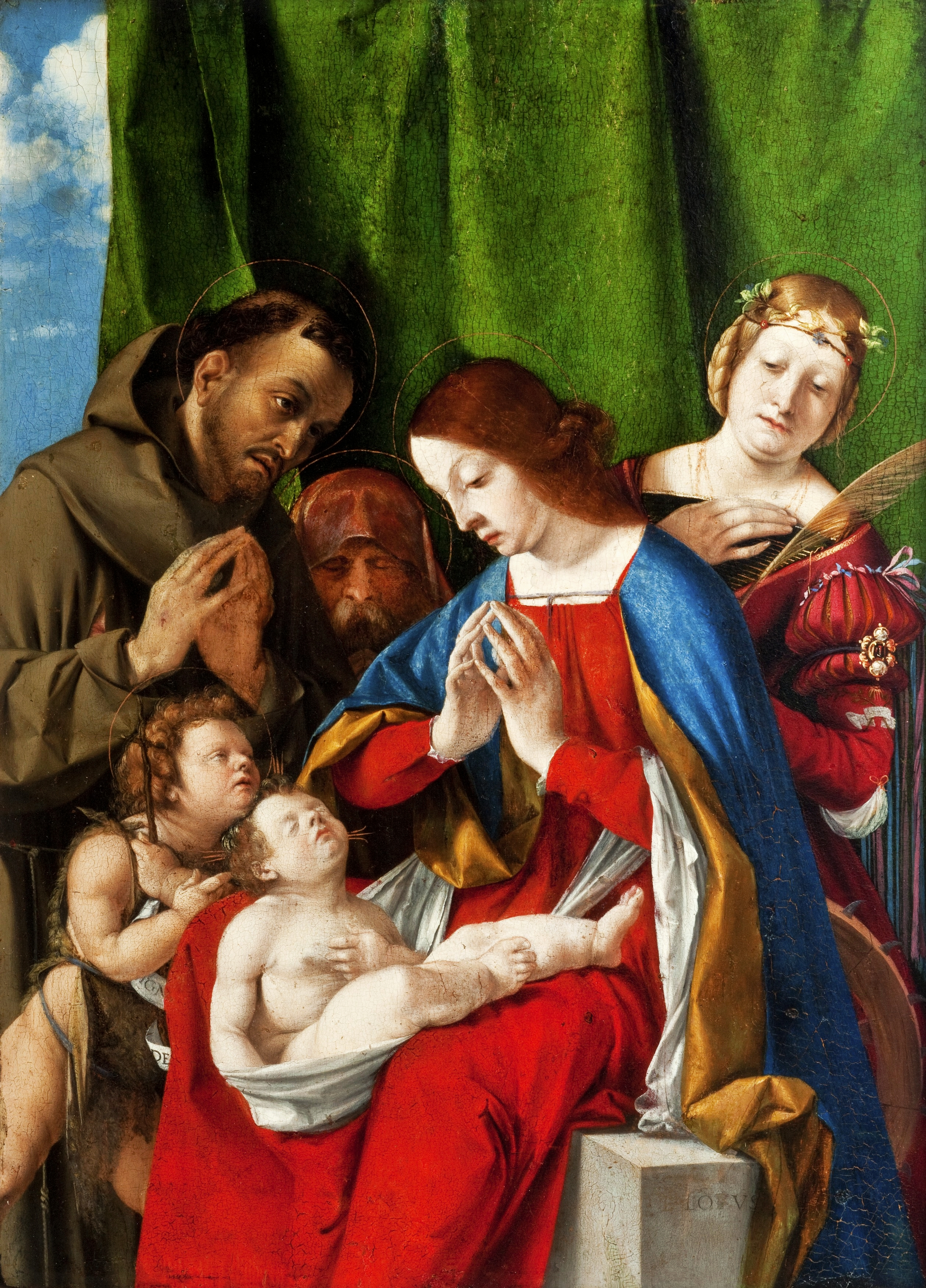
The Adoration of the Child, (c. 1508), oil on panel, National Museum in Kraków

In 1508 he began the Recanati Polyptych altarpiece for the church of San Domenico; this two-tiered and rather conventionally painted polyptych consists of six panels. His portrait Young Man against a White Curtain in the Kunsthistorisches Museum, Vienna (c. 1506) and Adoration of the Child (c. 1508) in the National Museum in Kraków with Catherine Cornaro, Queen of Cyprus portraited as Saint Catherine, are paintings from this period. As he became a respected painter, he came to the attention of Bramante, the papal architect, who was passing through Loreto (a pilgrimage site near Recanati). Lotto was invited to Rome to decorate the papal apartments, but nothing survives of this work, as it was destroyed a few years later. This destruction may have been due to Lotto's imitation of the style of Raphael, a rapidly rising star in the Papal court, as he had done in the Transfiguration of the Recanati polyptych.

=== The Marche (1511–1513) and Bergamo (1513–1525) ===
In 1511 he was at work for the confraternity of the Buon Gesù in Jesi, painting an Entombment (Pinacoteca Civica, Jesi); soon after he was painting altarpieces in Recanati: a Transfiguration (c.1512, now in the Pinacoteca Comunale, Recanati and a fresco (St Vincent Ferrer) for the church of San Domenico. His work in Bergamo, the westernmost town of the Venetian republic, was to prove his best and most productive artistic period, when he received many commissions from wealthy merchants, well educated professionals and local aristocrats. He had become a rich colourist and an experienced draughtsman, who also developed the concept of the psychological portrait that revealed the thoughts and emotions of his subjects. In this he was continuing the tradition begun by Antonello da Messina and a good example would be his Portrait of a Young Man with a Book (now in the Accademia, Venice). He began 1513 with a monumental altarpiece: the "Martinengo Altarpiece" in the Dominican church of the Santi Bartolomeo e Stefano in Bergamo. This altarpiece was commissioned by Count Alessandro Martinengo-Colleoni, grandson of the famous condottiere Bartolomeo Colleoni, which would be finished in 1516 and shows us the influence of Bramante and Giorgione. His next assignment was the decoration of the churches of S Bernardino and of Sant'Alessandro in Colonna, with frescoes and distemper paintings. He would finish five more altarpieces between 1521 and 1523. In 1523 he went for a brief stay in the Marche, obtaining there several commissions for altarpieces, which he would paint during his stay in Venice.

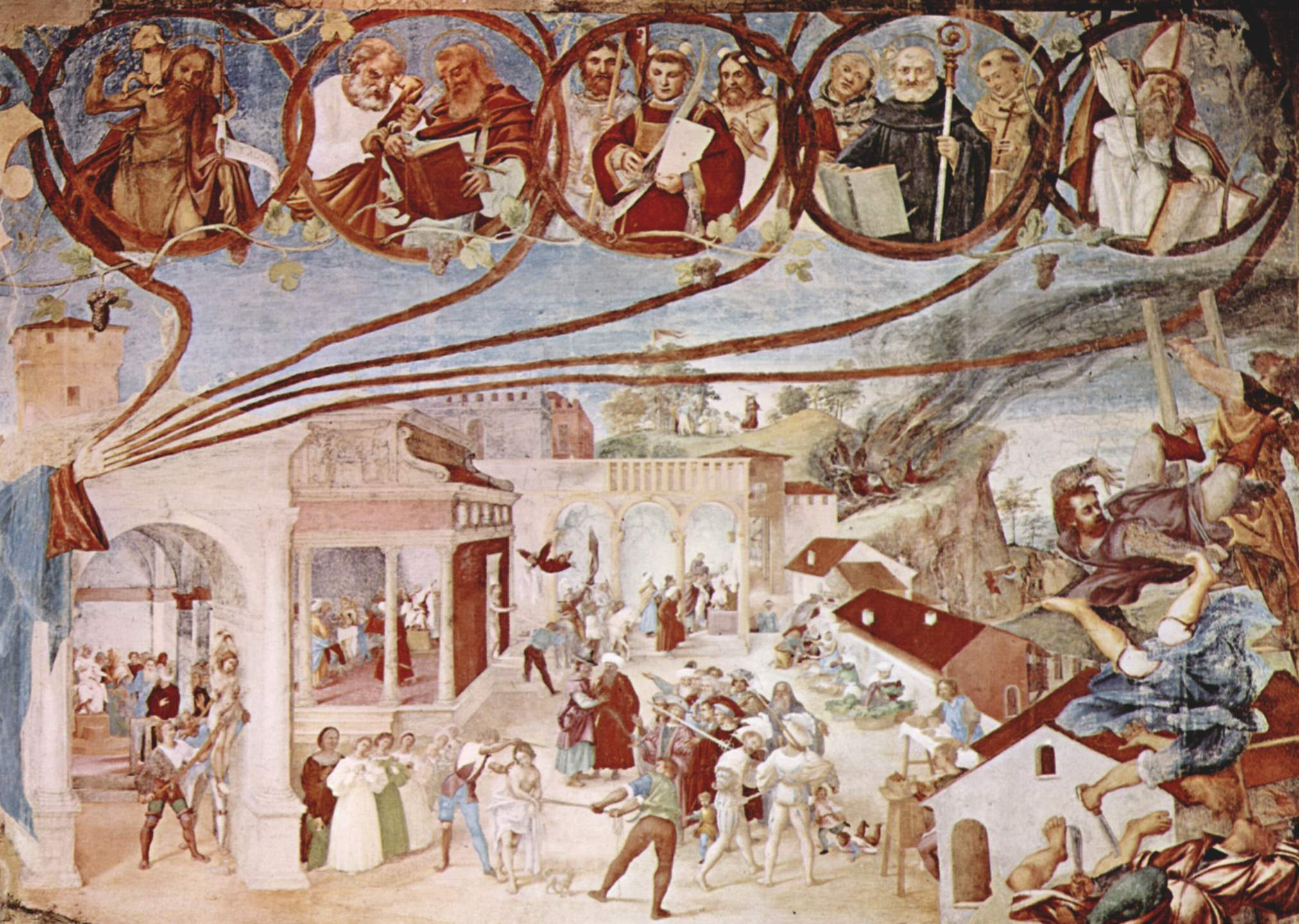
Martyrdom of St. Claire (1524), fresco

His next works are mostly wall paintings: in 1524 he painted a series of frescoes with the lives of saints (such as Saint Barbara) in the Suardi Chapel in Trescore (near Bergamo). In the details he depicts scenes of each saint's life, such as in the fresco Martyrdom of St. Claire. In the same fresco he portrays Christ with vines sprouting from his hands, illustrating the words of the New Testament: "I am the vine, you are the branches". In 1524 he also painted cartoons with Old Testament stories, as models for the intarsia panels for the choir stalls of Santa Maria Maggiore in Bergamo.

More than 20 private paintings date from the same period; they are mostly of religious and pious subjects, such as Madonnas or a Deposition, used for worship at home. Though he painted in the Classical tradition, Lotto adds a personal touch to the intense emotions. Using contrasting poses and opposing movement, he breaks the traditional symmetry of the Virgin surrounded by angels and saints.

=== Venice (1525–1532) ===
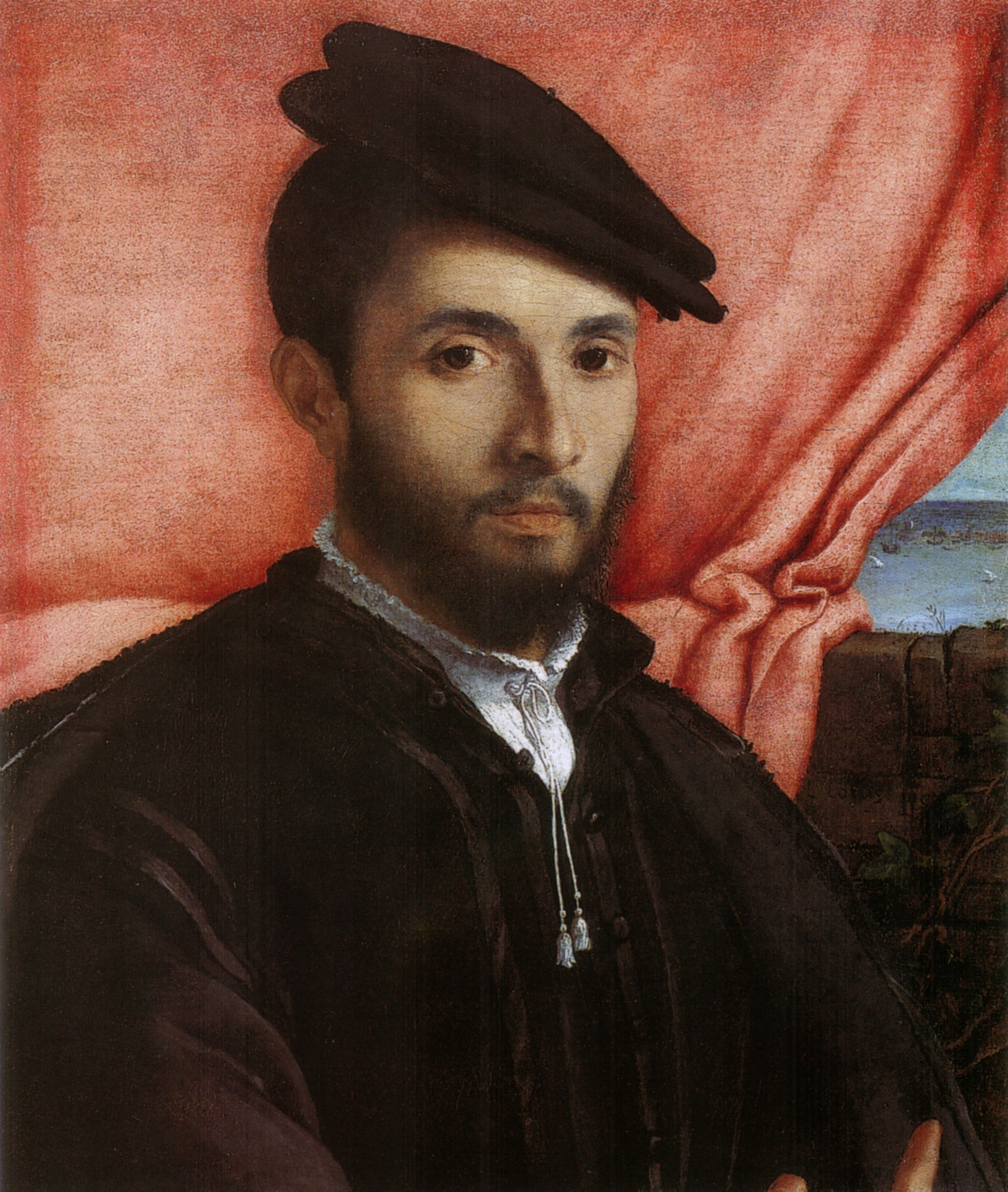
Portrait of a Young Man (1526)

In Venice, Lotto first resided at the Dominican monastery of Santi Giovanni e Paolo, but he was forced to leave after a few months after a conflict with intarsia artist Fra Damiano da Bergamo. To cope with the many commissions he started to receive, he founded a workshop. He shipped five altarpieces for churches in the Marche and another one for the church Santa Maria Assunta in Celano (near Bergamo). Another altarpiece was for the Venetian church of Santa Maria dei Carmini, portraying St. Nicholas of Bari in Glory.

As Venice was a city of great wealth and as popularity increased, he received many orders for private paintings, including ten portraits, among them, Portrait of a Young Man (Gemäldegalerie, Berlin). His portrait of Andrea Odoni (Royal Art Collection, Hampton Court) (1527) would later influence the portrait of Jacopo Strada by Titian (1568) (Kunsthistorisches Museum, Vienna). But in Venice he was overshadowed by Titian, who dominated the artistic scene.

=== Venice, the Veneto and the Marche (1532–1556) ===
In this last period of his life, Lorenzo Lotto would frequently move from town to town, searching for patrons and commissions. In 1532 he went to Treviso. Next he spent about seven years in the Marche (Ancona, Macerata and Jesi), before returning to Venice in 1540. He moved again to Treviso in 1542 and back to Venice in 1545. Finally he went back to Ancona in 1549.

This was a productive period in his life, during which he painted several altarpieces and portraits.

At the end of his life, Lotto found it difficult to earn a living. Furthermore, in 1550, when he was about 70, one of his works had an unsuccessful auction in Ancona. As recorded in his personal account book, this deeply disillusioned him. As he had always been a deeply religious man, in 1552 he joined the Holy Sanctuary at Loreto, becoming a lay brother. During that time he decorated the basilica of Santa Maria and painted a Presentation in the Temple for the Palazzo Apostolico in Loreto. He died in 1556 and was buried, at his request, in a Dominican habit.

Giorgio Vasari included Lotto's biography in the third volume of his book Vite. Lorenzo Lotto himself left many letters and a detailed notebook (Libro di spese diverse, 1538–1556), giving insight to his life and work. His influence was felt by many painters, including probably Giovanni Busi, and Ercole Ramazzani, born in Arcevia and active near Jesi. Another pupil was Durante Nobili.

Thanks to the work of the art historian Bernard Berenson, Lotto was rediscovered at the end of the 19th century. Since then, many monographs and several exhibitions have been dedicated to Lorenzo Lotto, such as the exhibition in Venice in 1953, one in the National Gallery of Art, Washington, D.C., in 1998, and one at the National Gallery, London focused on his portraits.

== Selected works ==
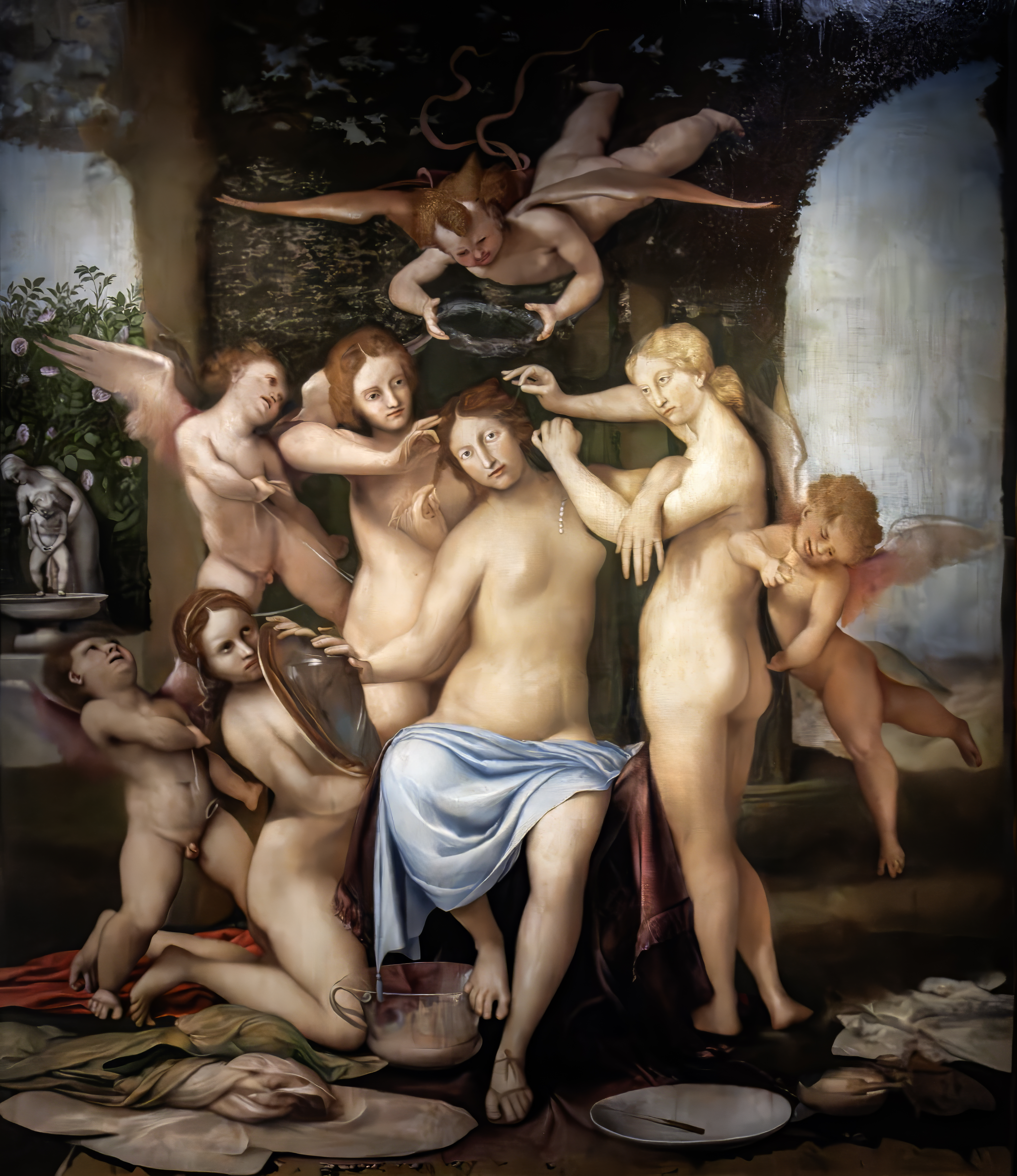
Venus adorned by the Graces and Four Cupids (1527), Complesso di santa Caterina in Treviso

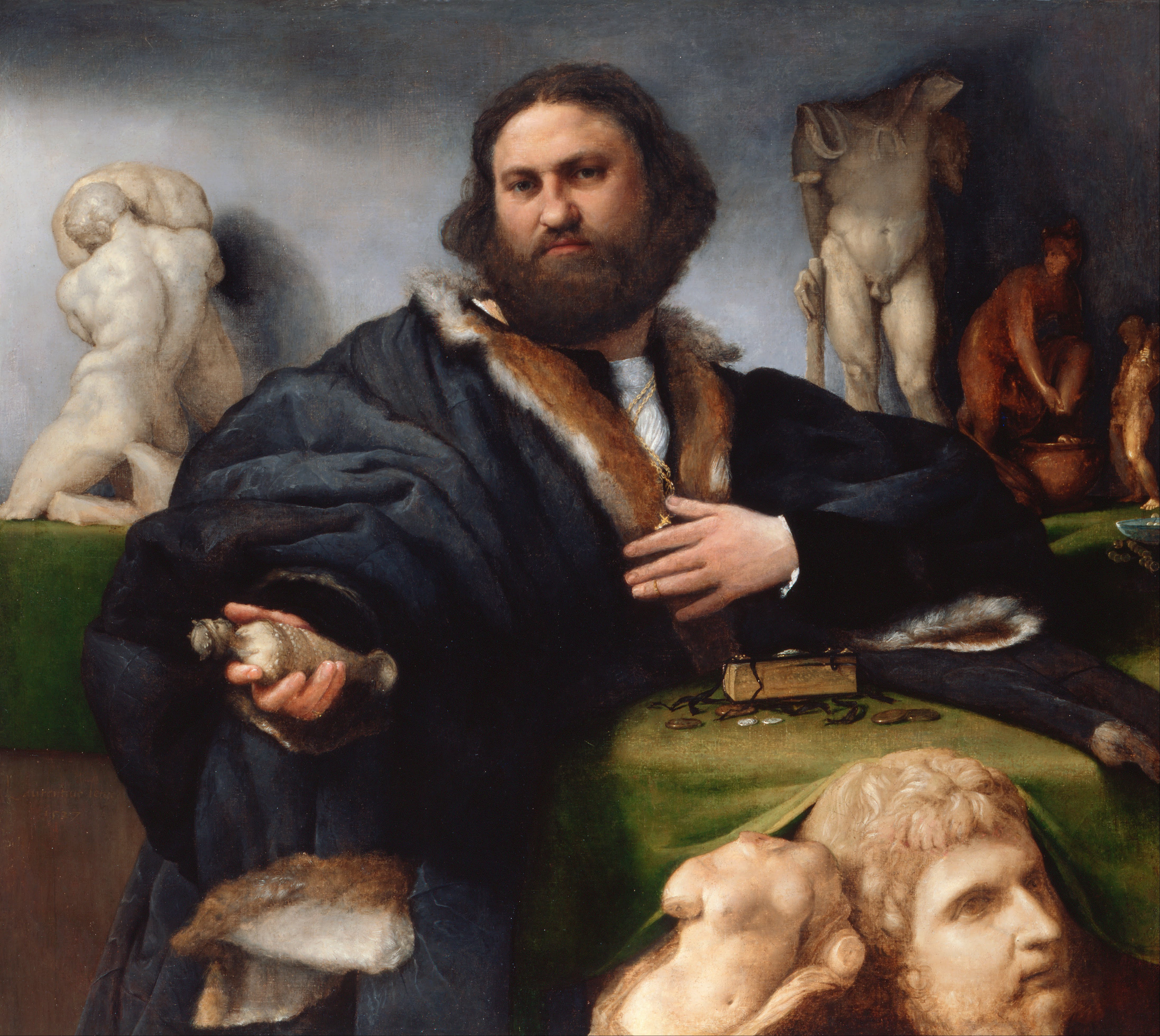
Portrait of Andrea Odoni (1527), Royal Collection

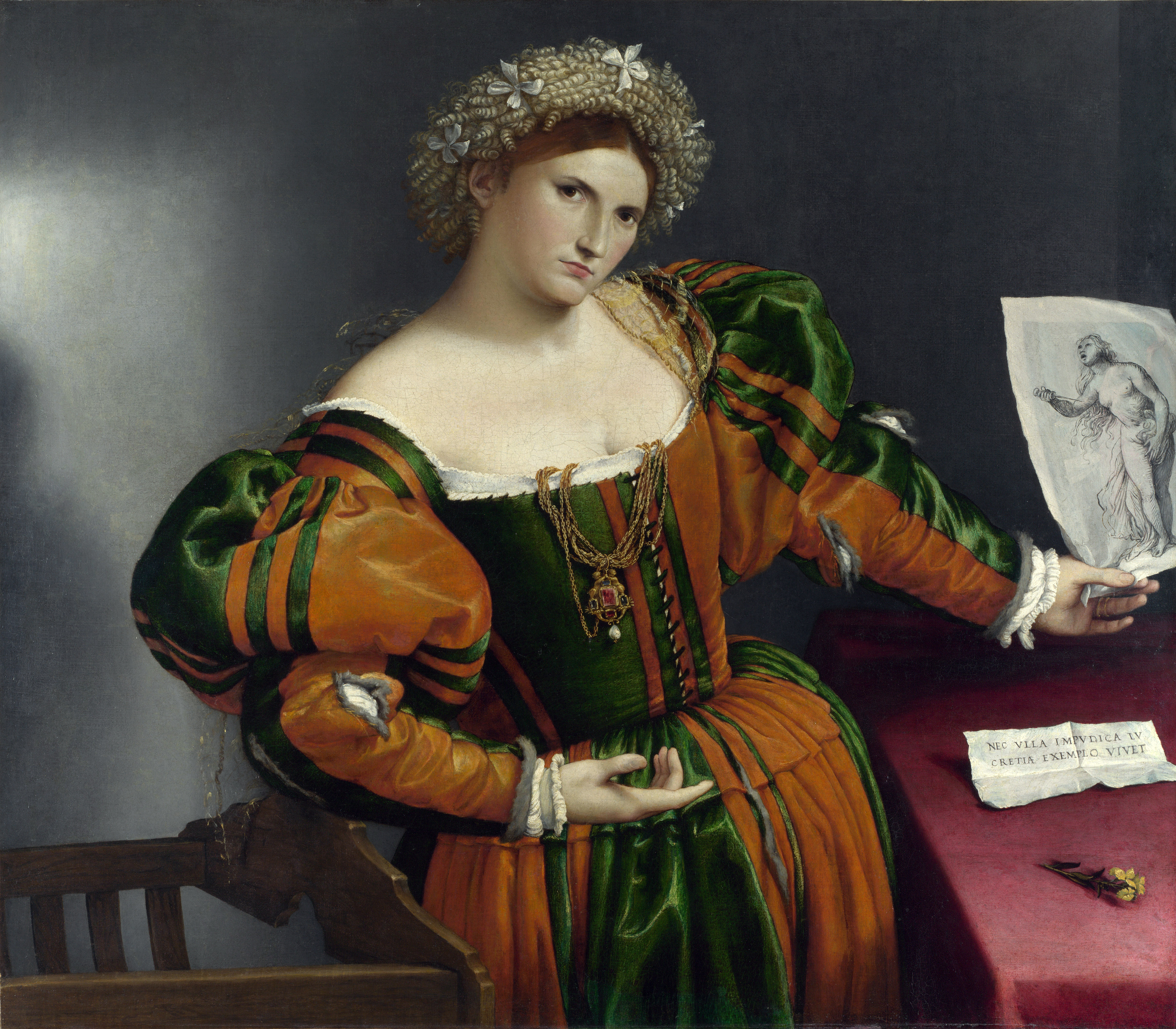
Venetian Woman in the Guise of Lucretia (1533)

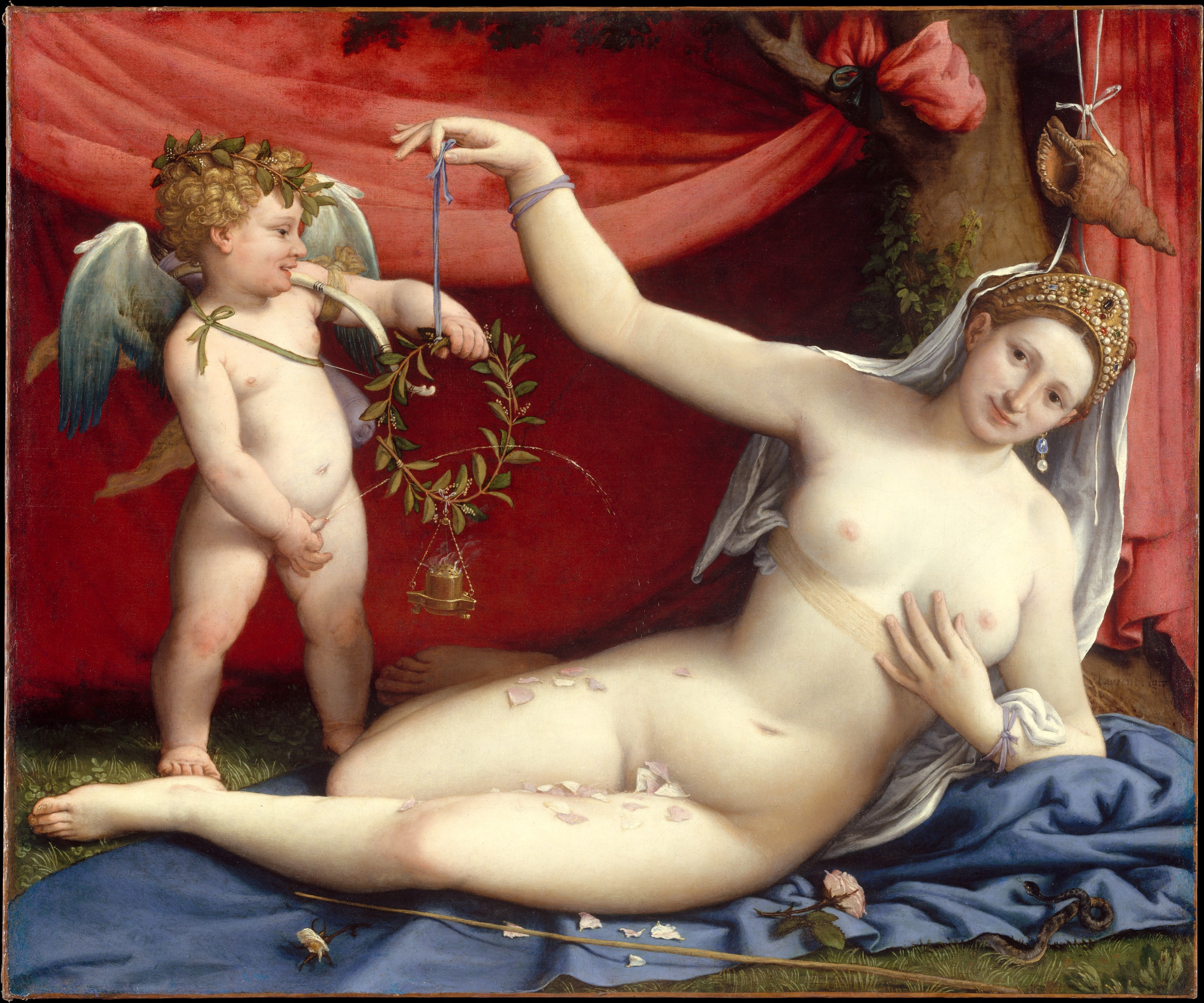
Venus and Cupid, 1530, Metropolitan Museum of Art

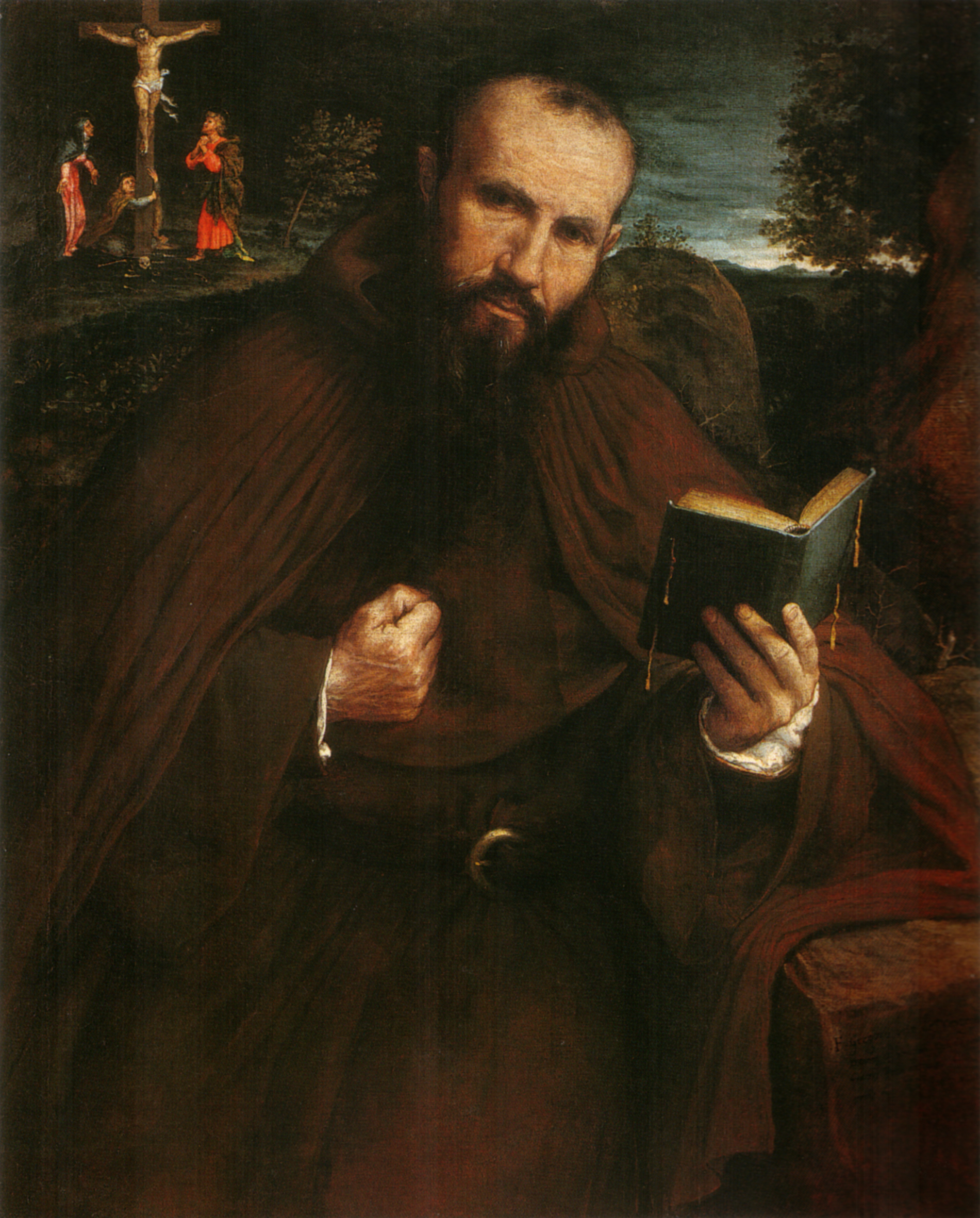
Brother Gregorio Belo of Vicenza, 1547, Metropolitan Museum of Art

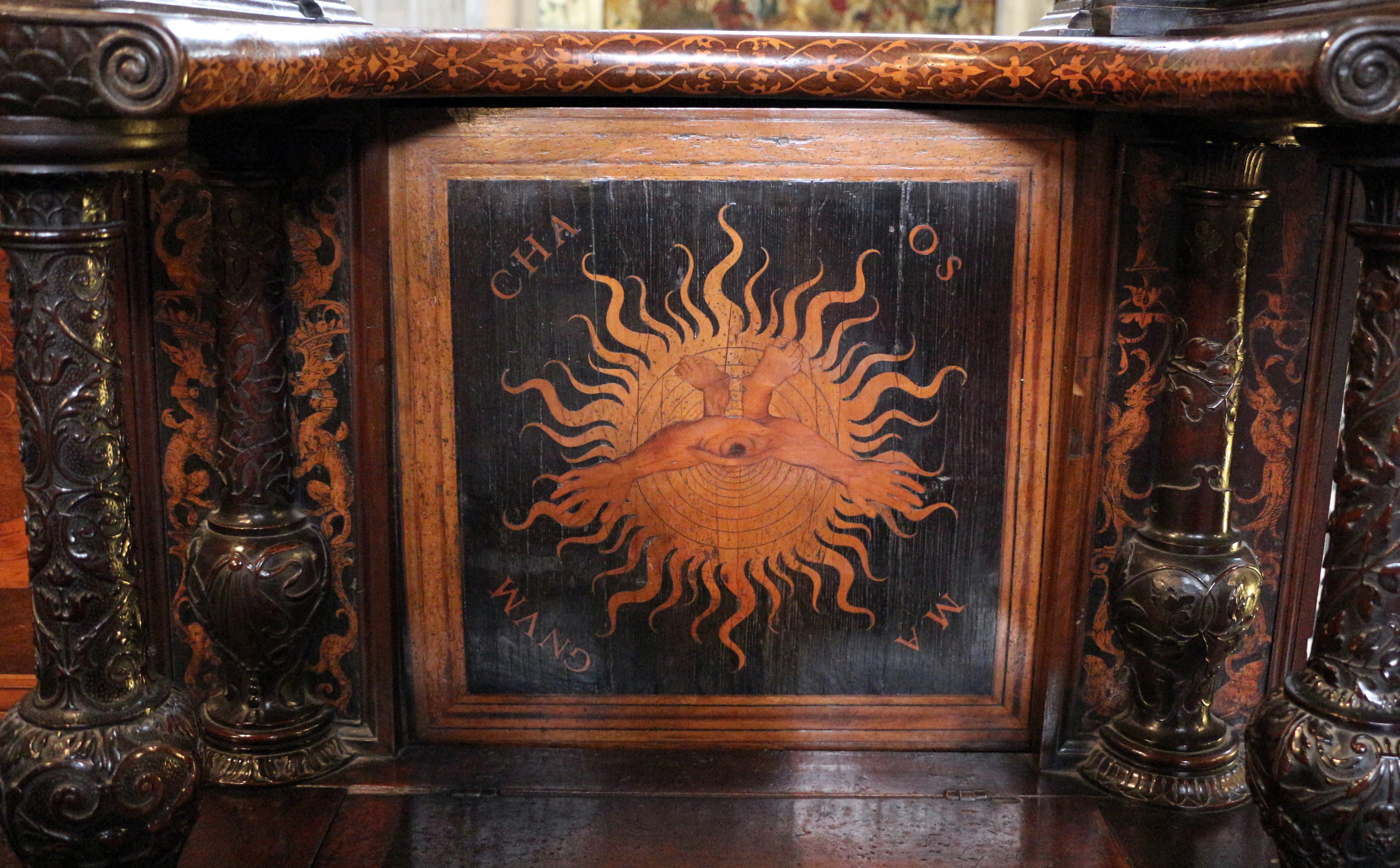
Intarsia of the choir of Santa Maria Maggiore, Bergamo, 1524–1531

- Madonna with Child, St. Peter of Verona and Donor (1503). National Museum of Capodimonte, Naples
- Santa Cristina al Tiverone Altarpiece (c. 1504–1506). Church of Santa Cristina al Tiverone, Quinto di Treviso, Veneto
- Allegory of Virtue and Vice (1505). National Gallery of Art, Washington, USA
- Allegory of Chastity (c. 1505). National Gallery of Art, Washington
- Madonna with Child and Saints (c. 1505). Scottish National Gallery, Edinburgh, United Kingdom
- Asolo Altarpiece (1506). Cathedral of Asolo, Veneto
- Recanati Polyptych (1506–1508). Civic Museum Villa Colloredo Mels, Recanati
- Portrait of a Young Man with a Lamp (c. 1506). Kunsthistorisches Museum, Vienna
- Saint Jerome in Penitence (c. 1506). Louvre, Paris
- Adoration of the Christ Child (1508). National Museum, Kraków
- Saint Joseph and the Virgin Suitors (c. 1508). Thyssen-Bornemisza Museum, Madrid
- Mystic Marriage of Saint Catherine (1506–1508), Alte Pinakothek, Munich
- Madonna with Child between Sts. Flavian and Onuphrius (1508). Borghese Gallery, Rome
- Saint Jerome in Penitence (c. 1509). Museo nazionale di Castel Sant'Angelo
- Transfiguration (1510–1512). Civic Museum Villa Colloredo Mels, Recanati
- Martinengo Altarpiece (1513–1516), Santi Bartolomeo e Stefano, Bergamo
- Saint Jerome in Penitence, (1515). Allentown Art Museum, Pennsylvania
- Susanna and the Elders (1517), Uffizi Gallery, Florence
- Portrait of Lucina Brembati (c. 1518). Accademia Carrara, Bergamo
- Madonna and Child with Saint Roch and Saint Sebastian (c. 1518). National Gallery of Canada, Ottawa
- Holy Trinity (c. 1519–20). Museo Adriano Bernareggi in Bergamo.
- Christ Taking Leave of his Mother (Lotto), Gemäldegalerie, Berlin
- Wooden inlays (1520s). Santa Maria Maggiore, Bergamo
- Santo Spirito Altarpiece (1521). Church of Santo Spirito, Bergamo
- Adoration of the Child (1523). National Gallery of Art, Washington, USA
- Marsilio Cassotti and His Bride Faustina (1523). Prado Museum, Madrid
- Mystical Marriage of St Catherine of Alexandria (1523). Accademia Carrara, Bergamo
- Ritratto di coniugi (1524). Hermitage Museum, Saint Petersburg, Russia
- Christ Carrying the Cross (1526). Louvre, Paris
- Portrait of a Young Man with a Book (c. 1526) Pinacoteca del Castello Sforzesco, Milan
- Portrait of Andrea Odoni (1527). Royal Collection, London
- Madonna and Child with Saint Catherine and Saint James, (c. 1527). Kunsthistorisches Museum, Vienna
- Portrait of a Gentleman with a Lion Paw (c. 1527). Kunsthistorisches Museum, Vienna
- Saint Nicholas in Glory (1527–1529). Santa Maria dei Carmini, Venice
- Triumph of Chastity (c. 1530). Palazzo Pallavicini Rospigliosi, Rome
- Venus and Cupid (c. 1530). Metropolitan Museum of Art, New York
- Saint Lucy Before the Judge (1532). Pinacoteca comunale, Jesi
- The Sleeping Child Jesus with the Madonna, St. Joseph and St. Catherine of Alexandria (1533). Accademia Carrara, Bergamo
- Portrait of a Lady as Lucretia (1533). National Gallery, London.
- Madonna with Child and Two Donors (c. 1533–1535). Getty Center, Los Angeles, US
- Recanati Annunciation (c. 1534). Civic Museum Villa Colloredo Mels, Recanati
- Holy Family with SS Jerome, Anna and Joachim (1534). Uffizi, Florence
- Holy Family with St. John the Baptist (c. 1536). Louvre, Paris
- Pietà (1538–1545). Pinacoteca di Brera, Milan
- Portrait of a Young Man, Uffizi, Florence
- Crucifixion with Pietà, Church of Santa Maria in Telusiano, Monte San Giusto
- Madonna of the Rosary (1539). Church of San Nicolò or San Domenico, Cingoli
- Altarpiece of the Halberd (c. 1539). Ancona, Pinacoteca Civica Francesco Podesti
- Portrait of a Man with a Felt Hat (c. 1541) National Gallery of Canada, Ottawa
- Bust of a Bearded Man (1541, ascribed). Fine Arts Museum, San Francisco
- The Alms of Saint Anthony (1542). Church of Santi Giovanni e Paolo, Venice
- Portrait of Laura da Pola (1543–1544). Pinacoteca di Brera, Milan
- Portrait of an Old Man with Gloves (c. 1543). Pinacoteca di Brera, Milan
- Portrait of a Man (c. 1545) Pinacoteca di Brera, Milan
- Madonna and four Saints (1546) Church of San Giacomo dall’Orio, Venice
- Saint Jerome in Penitence (1546). Prado Museum, Madrid
- Portrait of Brother Gregorio Belo of Vicenza (1548). Metropolitan Museum of Art, New York City
- Assumption (1550). Church of San Francesco alle Scale, Ancona
- The Crossbowman (1551). Pinacoteca Capitolina, Rome
- Portrait of an Old man (c. 1552, ascribed). Hermitage Museum, Saint Petersburg.
- Presentation in the Temple (1552–1556). Palazzo Apostolico, Loreto
- Selfportrait (?). Thyssen-Bornemisza Museum, Madrid.

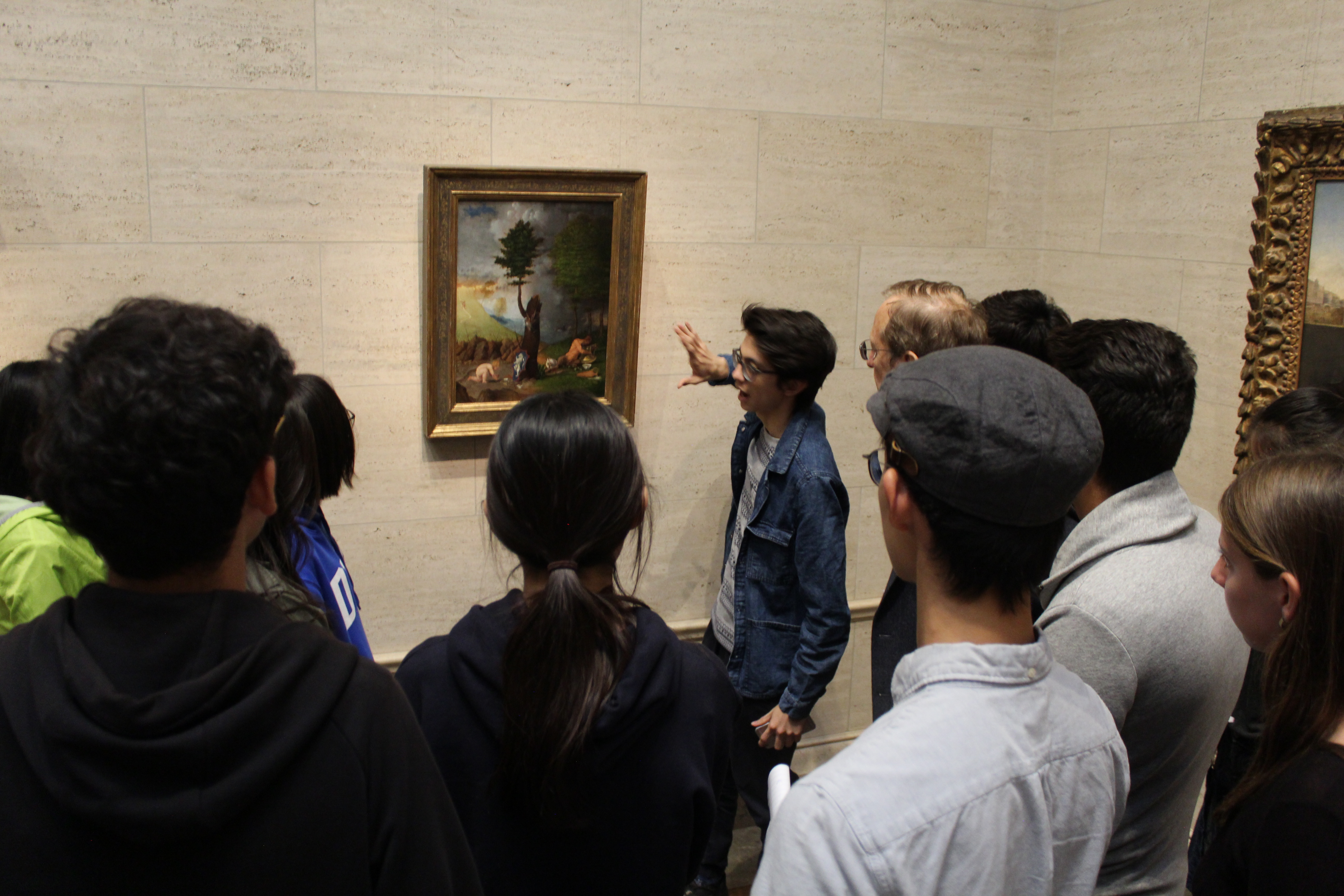
Students from Duke University view Lotto's Allegory of Virtue and Vice at the National Gallery of Art in Washington, D.C.

== See also ==
- Lotto carpet, a lacy patterned Turkish carpet named for him.

== Sources ==
- Benezit E. Dictionnaire des Peintres, Sculpteurs, Dessinateurs et Graveurs; Librairie Gründ, Paris, 1976; ISBN 2-7000-0156-7 (in French)
- Turner J. Grove Dictionary of Art. Macmillan Publishers Ltd, 1990; ISBN 1-884446-00-0
- Ricketts Melissa. Maestros del Renacimiento (in Dutch Translation: Grote meesters uit de Renaissance. Rebo International BV, 2005 ISBN 90-5841-089-7)
- Benesch, Otto (December 1957). "New Contributions to Lorenzo Lotto". Burlington Magazine. 99 (657): 410–413.
- Berenson, Bernard. Lorenzo Lotto. The Phaidon Press
- Kaap, Henry. Lorenzo Lotto malt Andrea Odoni: Kunstschaffen und Kunstsammeln zwischen Bildverehrung, Bildskepsis, Bildwitz. Berlin, Gebr. Mann Verlag 2021. ISBN 978-3-7861-2865-6
- Brown, David Alan, ed., with contributions by Peter Humfrey, Mauro Lucco, and Augusto Gentili. Lorenzo Lotto: Rediscovered Master of the Renaissance. Washington, D.C.: Catalogue of the exhibition in the National Gallery of Art. New Haven: Yale University Press, 1997.
- Humfrey, Peter. Lorenzo Lotto. New Haven, Yale University Press, 1997; ISBN 0-300-06905-7 (the first full-length study of Lorenzo Lotto since the monograph of Bernard Berenson)
- Zanchi, Mauro. Lotto. I simboli. Giunti, Firenze 2011. ISBN 88-09-76478-1
