= Saint Nicholas in Glory =

Altarpiece painting by Lorenzo Lotto

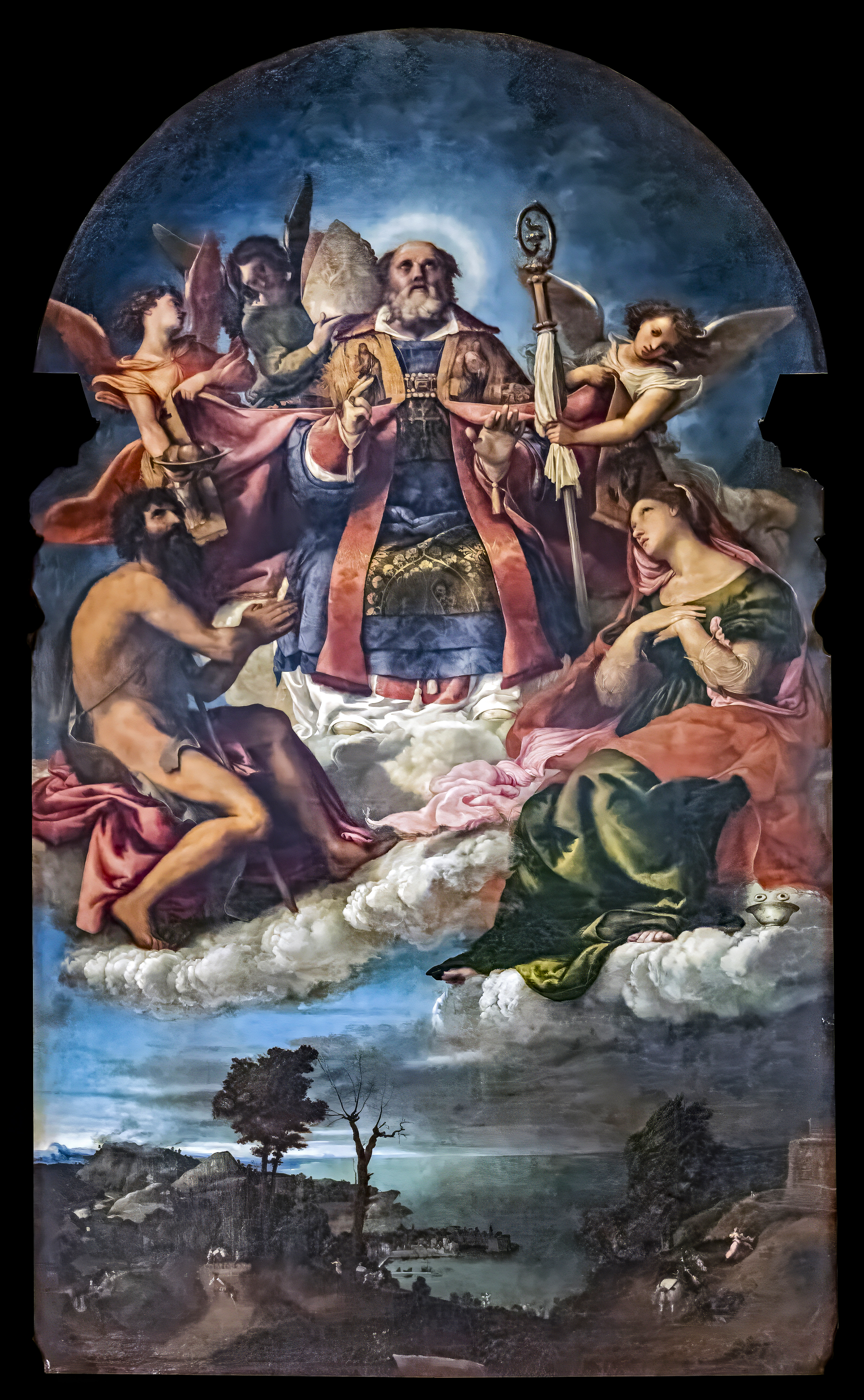
- Artist: Lorenzo Lotto
- Year: 1527–1529
- Medium: Oil on canvas
- Dimensions: 335 cm × 188 cm (132 in × 74 in)
- Location: Santa Maria dei Carmini, Venice

Saint Nicholas in Glory is an altarpiece by the Italian Renaissance artist Lorenzo Lotto, executed in 1527–1529 and located in the church of Santa Maria dei Carmini, Venice.

== History ==
An inscription at the altar's base reports that the canvas was commissioned in 1527 by the guardiano (curator of the church) Giovanni Battista Donati and his vicar Giorgio de' Mundis. They chose a depiction of Saint Nicholas because of their membership in a merchants' brotherhood, which was dedicated to that saint. A frame in Istrian stone had already been prepared before the work's execution.

This was Lotto's first work after his return to Venice from Bergamo. Despite several innovative elements (such as the nocturnal landscape in the lower part), the canvas was poorly received by contemporaries. According to contemporary historians, the canvas was completed as early as 1529.

== Description ==
According to a pattern inspired by Albrecht Dürer's prints, Lotto placed Saint Nicholas in the upper center, with a luminous halo crowning his face. The saint is looking upwards, suggesting that he is ascending, and is surrounded by three angels who keep his mantle open and hold his traditional symbols: the mitre, the episcopal crozier and three golden balls, in memory of the three maidens saved by Nicholas according to the legend.

Below him are Saints John the Baptist (patron of one of the donors) and Lucy, whose tooth is alleged to have been preserved in the church as a holy relic.

The lower part is occupied by a dark landscape featuring, among other details, a sea harbor and a port struck by a storm. The style of this section shows the influence of the Danube school. The small scene of Saint George killing the dragon was added to fulfill one of the donor's wishes.

== Sources ==
- Pirovano, Carlo (2002). Lotto. Milan: Electa. ISBN 88-435-7550-3.
- D'Adda, Roberta (2004). Lotto. Milan: Skira.
