= Holy Family with St Jerome and St Anne =

1534 painting by Lorenzo Lotto

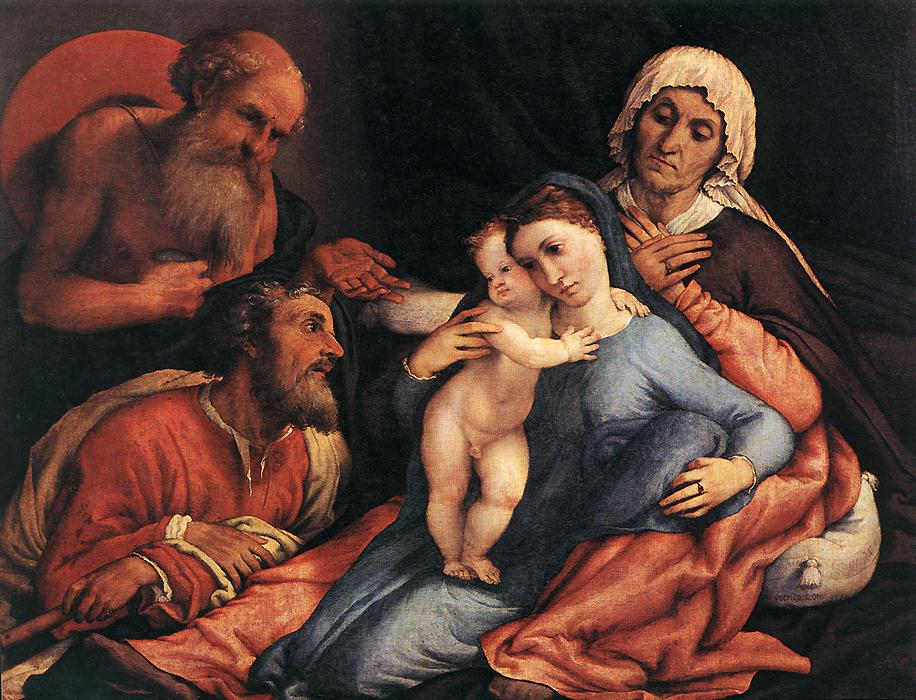
- Artist: Lorenzo Lotto
- Year: 1534
- Medium: oil on canvas
- Location: Uffizi; Florence

Holy Family with St Jerome and St Anne is a 1534 signed and dated oil-on-canvas painting by Italian artist Lorenzo Lotto (ca. 1480–1556), first recorded at the Palazzo Pitti at the start of the 18th century and now in the Uffizi in Florence.

The work is possibly derived from a prototype now in the Seilern Collection in London – that work has an open window framing a landscape in place of St Jerome. The Uffizi painting shows Saint Jerome, Saint Joachim and Saint Anne to either side of the Holy Family.
