= Mystic Marriage of Saint Catherine (Lotto, Munich) =

1506-1508 painting by Loreno Lotto

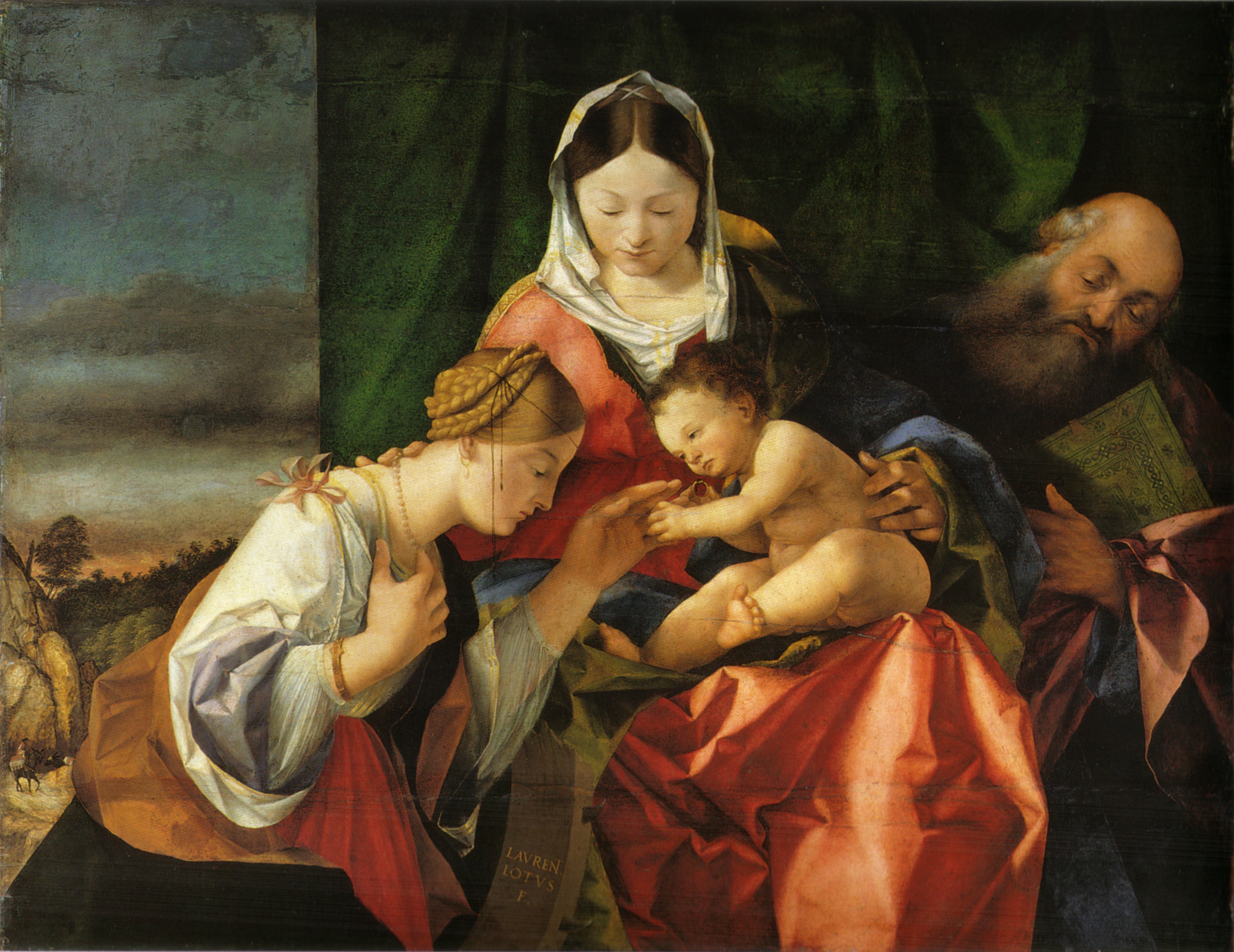
Mystic Marriage of Saint Catherine (1506–1508) by Lorenzo Lotto

Mystic Marriage of Saint Catherine is an oil-on-panel painting by Italian Renaissance artist Lorenzo Lotto, painted ca. 1506–1508. It is signed on Catherine of Alexandria's broken wheel (centre foreground) "Laurent.[ius] Lotus F.[ecit]". The painting is known to have moved from the Würzburg Residence to the Hofgartengalerie in 1804 and then to its present home in the Alte Pinakothek in Munich.

A workshop version of the painting is in the Museum of Fine Arts, Boston.
