= Portrait of a Man (Lotto) =

c. 1545 painting by Lorenzo Lotto

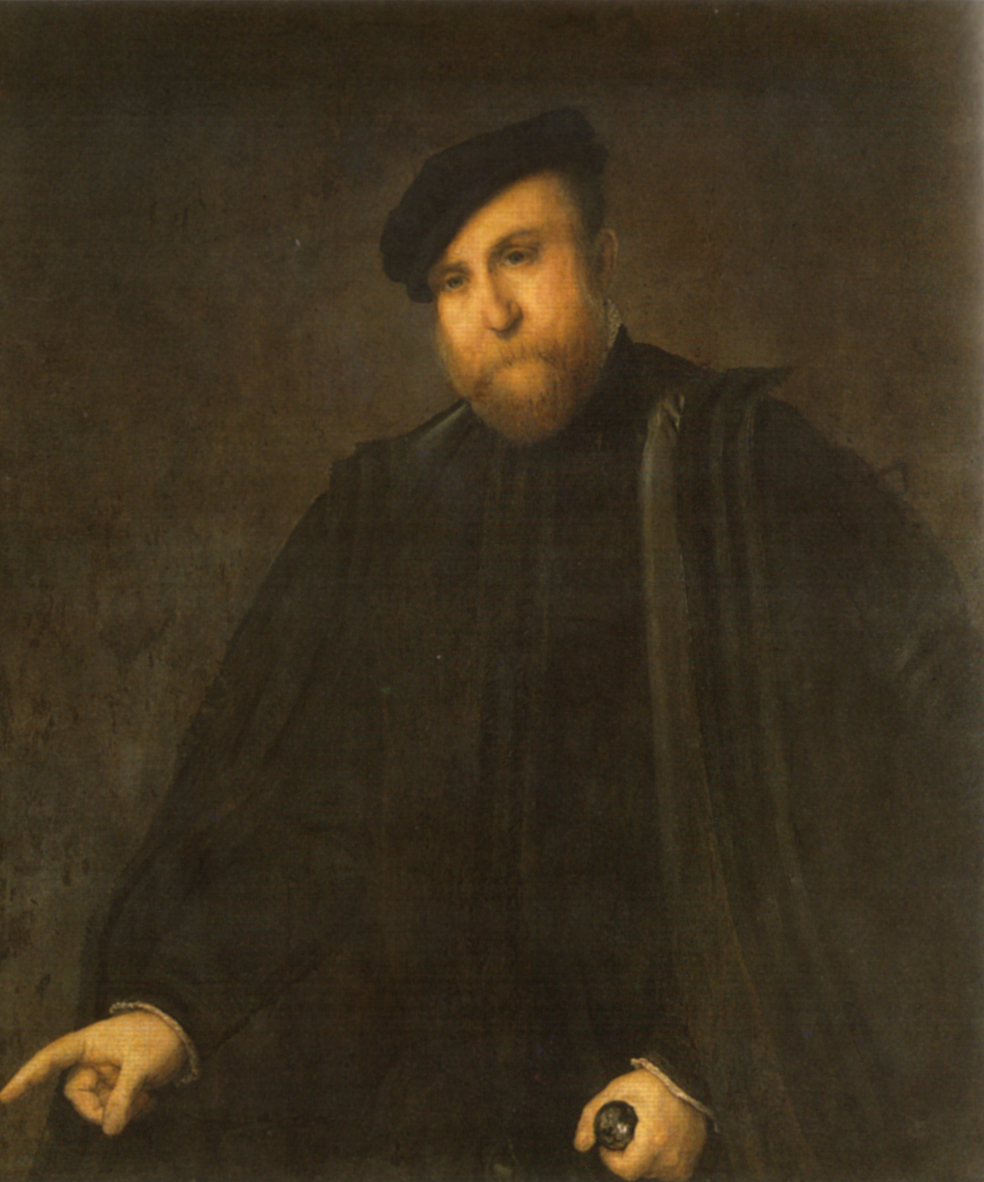
Portrait of a Man (c. 1545) by Lorenzo Lotto

Portrait of a Man is an oil-on-canvas painting created c. 1545 by the Italian High Renaissance artist Lorenzo Lotto. Its dating is based on stylistic similarities to Lotto's other works of the mid-1540s, such as Portrait of an Old Man with Gloves (Milan). Another theory holds that the subject is Giovanni Taurini da Montepulciano, viceroy of Ancona, which would change the date to 1551, the year of Lotto's arrival in Ancona. It is now in the Pinacoteca di Brera in Milan, which it entered in 1855 as part of the Oggioni Bequest.
