= Pietà (Lotto) =

1545 painting by Lorenzo Lotto

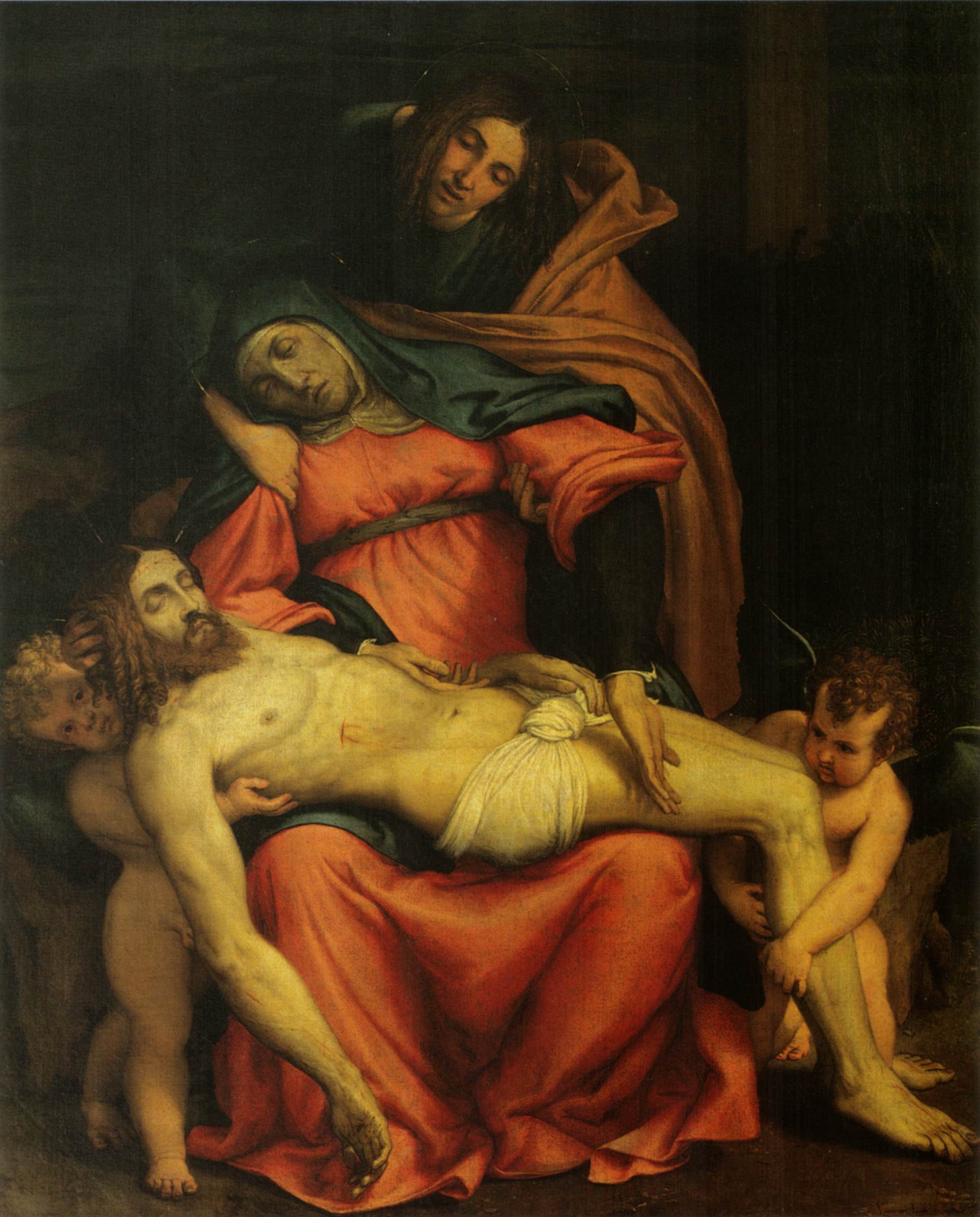
Pietà (1538–1545) by Lorenzo Lotto

Pietà is an oil-on-canvas painting by the Italian High Renaissance artist Lorenzo Lotto, signed "Laurentio Lotto". It is mentioned in Lotto's account books as being commissioned in 1538 for the altar dedicated to the Pietà in the Dominican Church of San Paolo in Treviso. The account books also mention that the work was completed in 1545. That church was suppressed under the Napoleonic regime late in the 18th century and in 1811 the painting was bought for 12 ducats by the Pinacoteca di Brera in Milan, where it still hangs.
