= Saint Lucy Before the Judge =

1532 painting by Lorenzo Lotto

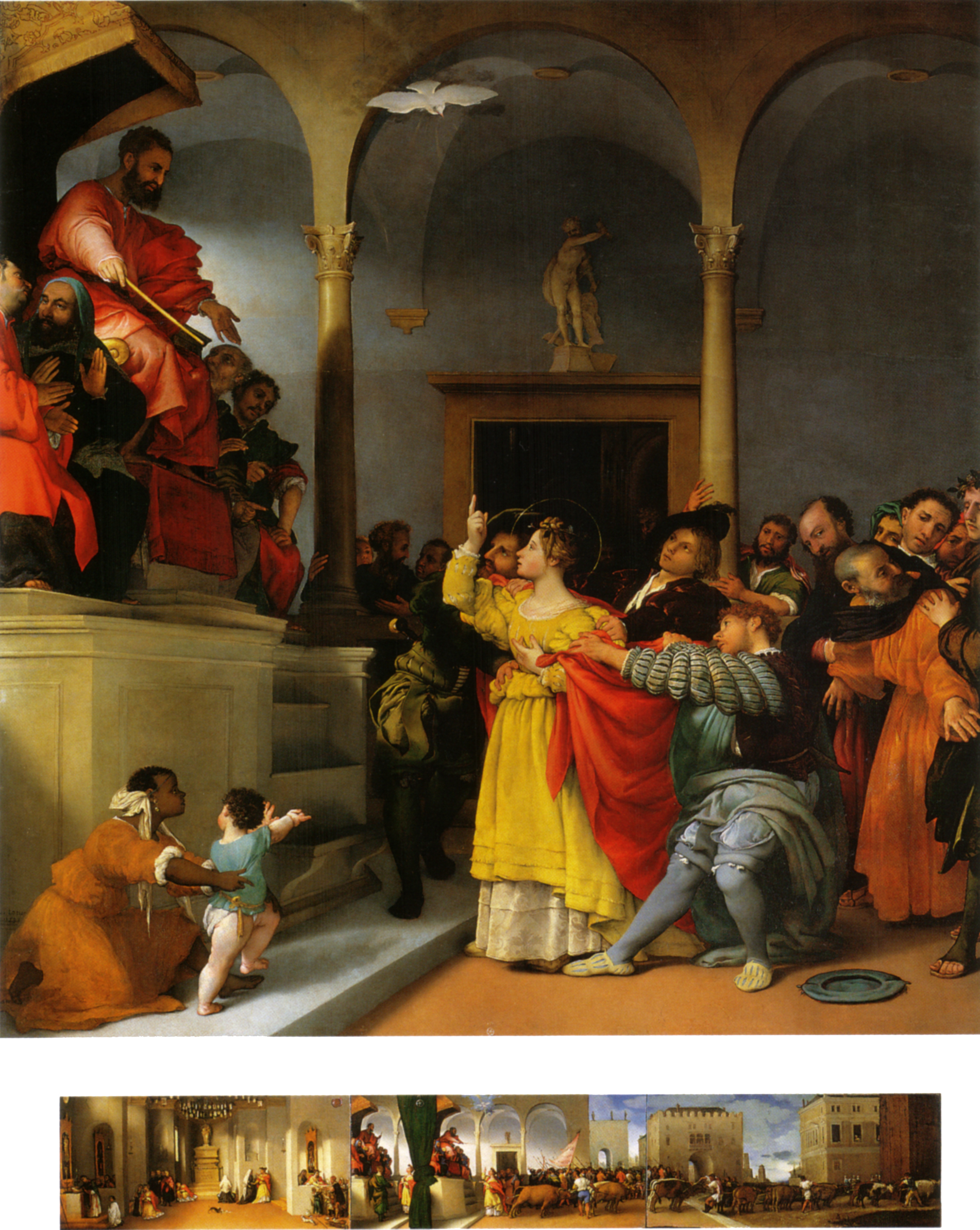
Saint Lucy Before the Judge (1532) by Lorenzo Lotto

Saint Lucy Before the Judge is a mixed-medium panel painting by the Italian Renaissance artist Lorenzo Lotto, signed and dated to 1532, consisting of a main work and a predella with three other scenes from saint Lucy's life. It is now in the painting gallery of the Musei Civici di Palazzo Pianetti in Jesi in the province of Ancona.

Lotto signed the contract for the work on 11 December 1523, having travelled to Jesi specifically to do so. It was a commission from the Confraternity of Santa Lucia for a chapel in the church of San Floriano. Work on the painting dragged out, risking the contract being withdrawn, and was only completed in 1532. When the church was suppressed in 1870 the work was moved to the town museum.
