= Madonna and Child with Saints (Lotto) =

1505 painting by Lorenzo Lotto

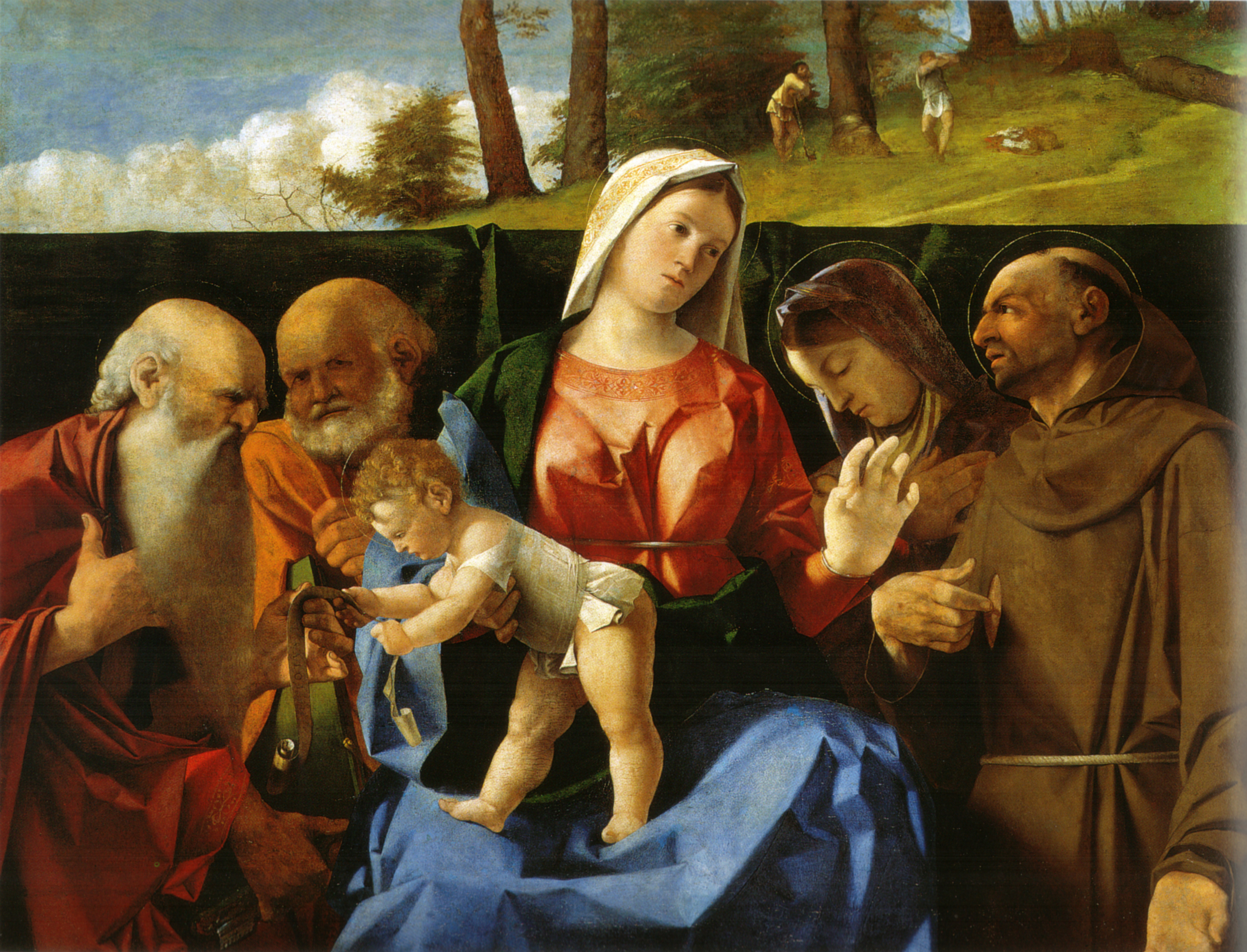
Madonna and Child with Saints (c. 1505) by Lorenzo Lotto

Madonna and Child with Saints is an oil-on-panel painting by Lorenzo Lotto, signed "L. Lotus F.[ecit]", and created c. 1505. It was first definitively recorded in 1727, when it was in France in the Orléans Collection. It is now in the Scottish National Gallery in Edinburgh. It is in the Holy Conversation style – on the left are a male saint (a prophet or St Jerome, holding a scroll) and Saint Peter, whilst to the left are a female saint (possibly Clare of Assisi) and Francis of Assisi.
