= Portrait of a Woman Inspired by Lucretia =

1533 painting by Lorenzo Lotto

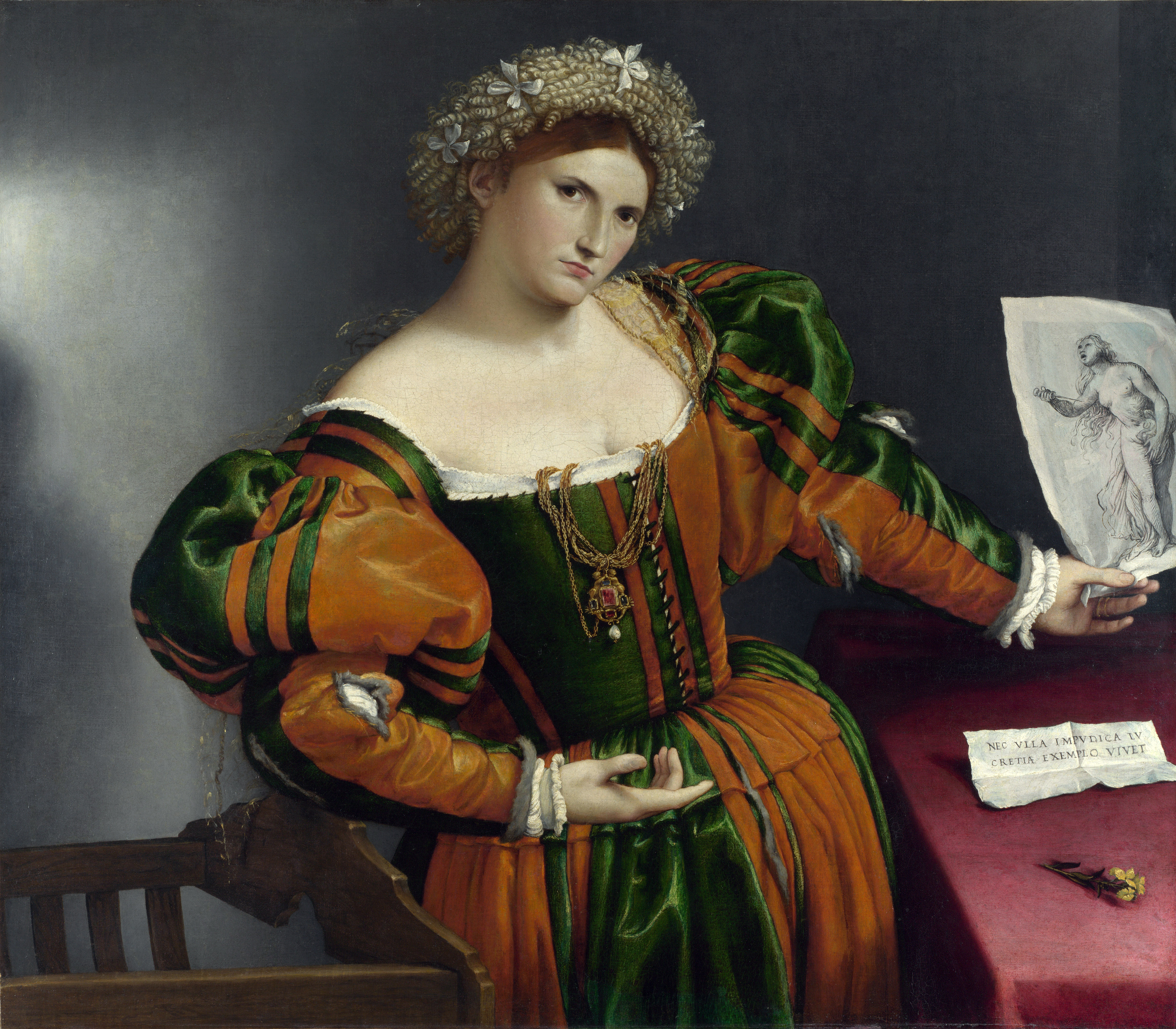
Portrait of a Woman Inspired by Lucretia (c. 1533) by Lorenzo Lotto

Portrait of a Woman Inspired by Lucretia is an oil-on-canvas portrait by the Italian Renaissance artist Lorenzo Lotto, created c. 1533. It is now in the National Gallery, London, which bought it in 1927.

It first appears in the written record at the end of the 18th century, when it was in the Pesaro collection in Venice. One theory holds that its subject was Lucrezi Valier, who married into the Pesaro family in 1533. It was then still misattributed to Giorgione.

The work's composition is similar to Lotto's Portrait of Andrea Odoni, with a standing figure beside a table and surrounded by symbolic objects. The subject holds and points to a print of the Roman heroine Lucretia committing suicide. A note on the table bears the inscription "Nec ulla impudica Lucretiae exemplo vivet" (no unchaste woman shall live by Lucretia's example), a quotation from Livy's account of the suicide. Together these indicate the subject's chastity and conjugal virtues, as does the bouquet of violets on the table.
