= Santo Spirito Altarpiece =

1521 painting by Lorenzo Lotto

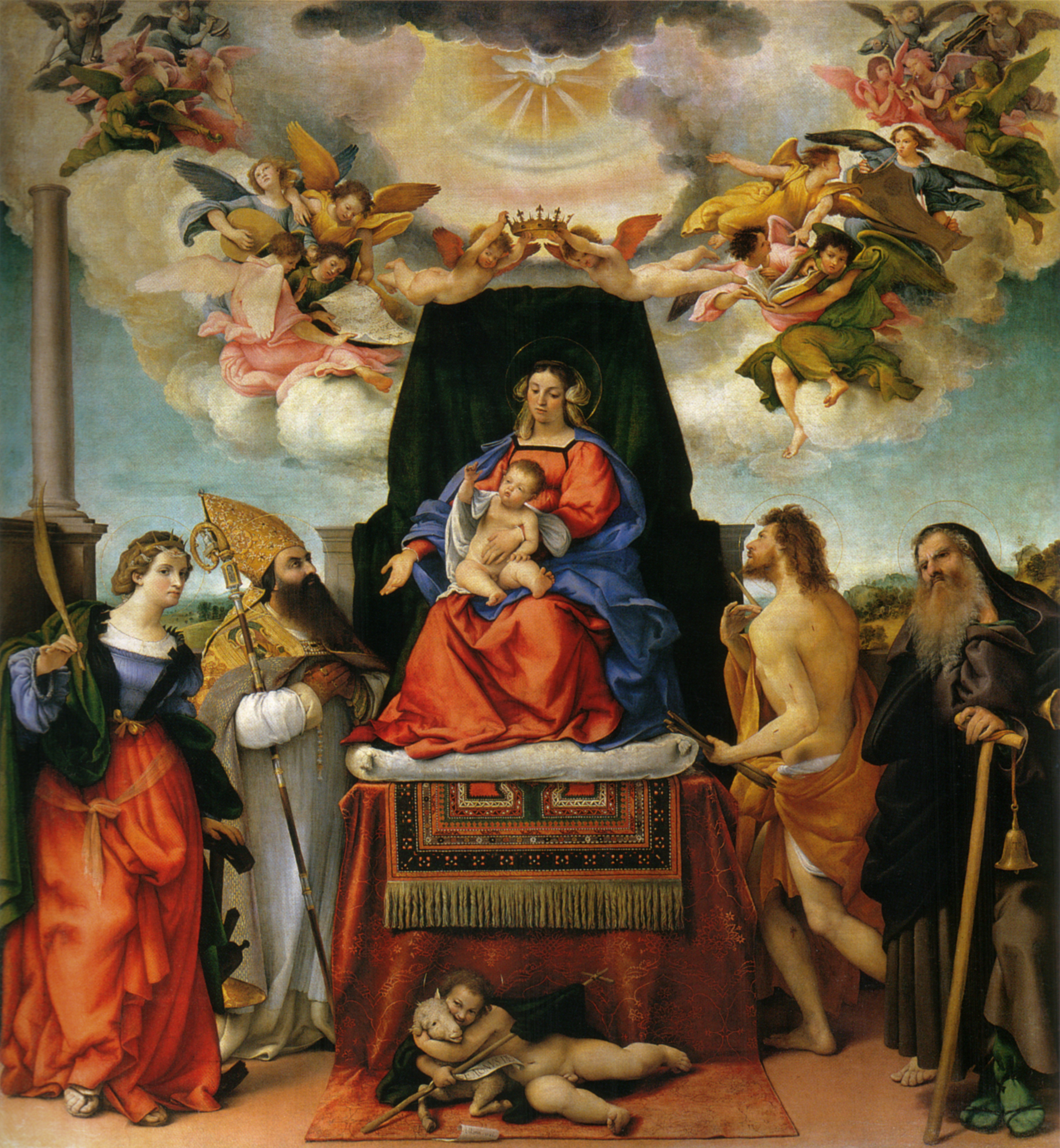
Santo Spirito Altarpiece (1521) by Lorenzo Lotto

The Santo Spirito Altarpiece is a 1521 oil-on-panel painting by Lorenzo Lotto, signed and dated "L. Lotus / 1521". The work shows the Madonna and Child with (from left to right) saints Catherine of Alexandria, Augustine of Hippo, Sebastian and Anthony the Great. At the foot of the throne is John the Baptist as a child with the Lamb of God.

No documents survive about the work's origins, though art historians hold that it was commissioned by Lotto's friend and patron Balsarino Marchetti Angelini, who had also funded the fourth chapel on the south side of the nave of the church of Santo Spirito in Bergamo. That chapel was completed in 1517, about the same time as the work seems to have been commissioned, around the same time as the San Bernardino Altarpiece. It was restored in 2014 and 2015 and still hangs in the same church today.
