= Santa Maria della Pietà in Telusiano, Monte San Giusto =

Church in Monte San Giusto, Italy

Coordinates: 43.23616°N 13.595241°E

Santa Maria della Pietà in Telusiano is a Renaissance-style Roman Catholic church located on Via Tolomei in Monte San Giusto, province of Macerata, in the region of Marche, Italy.

== History ==
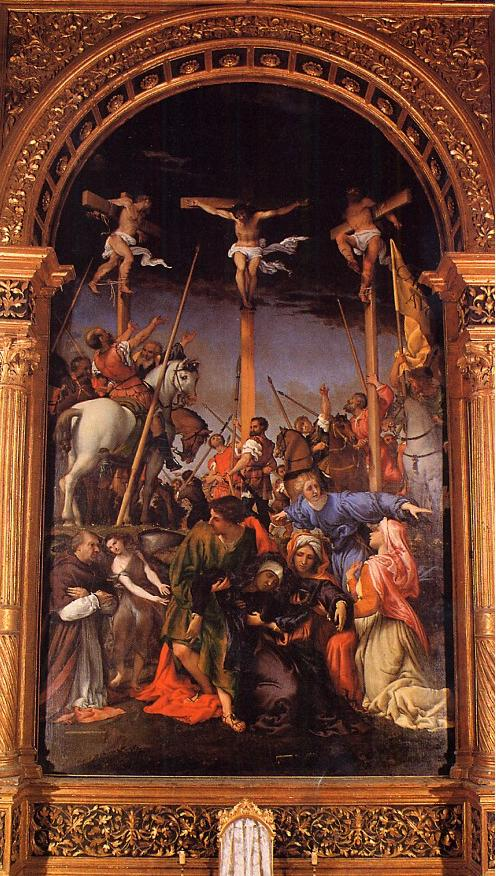
Crucifixion altarpiece by Lorenzo Lotto

A church at the site existed since the 15th century, it underwent reconstruction began in 1513, and it was reconsecrated in 1529 under the patronage of the bishop of Chiusi, Nicolò Bonafede. The Bishop's coat of arms is above the portal, and the architrave reads: N.BOFIDES EPISCOPVS CLUSINUS FVNDITVS RESTAVRAVIT.

The small church has elegant classical lines with Doric pilasters lining a single nave. A small dome just before the presbytery has neoclassical frescoes depicting the four evangelists in the spandrels. The walls still retain some of the 16th-century frescoed lunettes attributed to one of Lotto's students, Durante Nobili of Caldarola, and a late 17th-century copy of the Madonna of Trapani by Nino Pisano; and under the main altar, a 15th-century Northern European Vesperbild (or Pietà).

However, the most prominent feature of the church, and the most commonly visited tourist attraction in the town, is the main altarpiece: a Crucifixion (circa 1529-1530) by Lorenzo Lotto. The work was commissioned by Bishop Bonafede for the church, painted mainly in Venice, and completed in situ in the present frame circa 1534. Lotto was paid 100 gold florins and a quantity of olivo oil. The signature on the painting was not discovered until 1831.

The scene depicts three levels:

- Christ and the two robbers are crucified against a darkening sky.
- A disorganized rabble of soldiers, some on horseback, mill below the crosses, with multiple askance spears. It is claimed that the central figure facing the viewer at the base of Christ's cross is Lotto himself.
- The lowest scene depicts the Pietà, with the Virgin Mary fainting into the arms of St John, while an wrought Mary Magdalen in a blue dress embraces the scene. In the corner is the kneeling donor Bishop, who is being exposed the scene by an angel.
