= Madonna and Child with Two Donors (Lotto) =

1533-1535 painting by Lorenzo Lotto

Madonna and Child with Two Donors (1533–1535) by Lorenzo Lotto

Madonna and Child with Two Donors is an oil-on-canvas painting by the Italian Renaissance artist Lorenzo Lotto, created c. 1533–1535, now in the J. Paul Getty Museum in Los Angeles. It and other works by the artist originated in the Palazzo Pallavicini Rospigliosi collection in Rome before being sold to the Benson collection in London, then to the Hearst Corporation in New York and finally to its present owner.
