= Lament over the Dead Christ (Previtali) =

Painting by Andrea Previtali

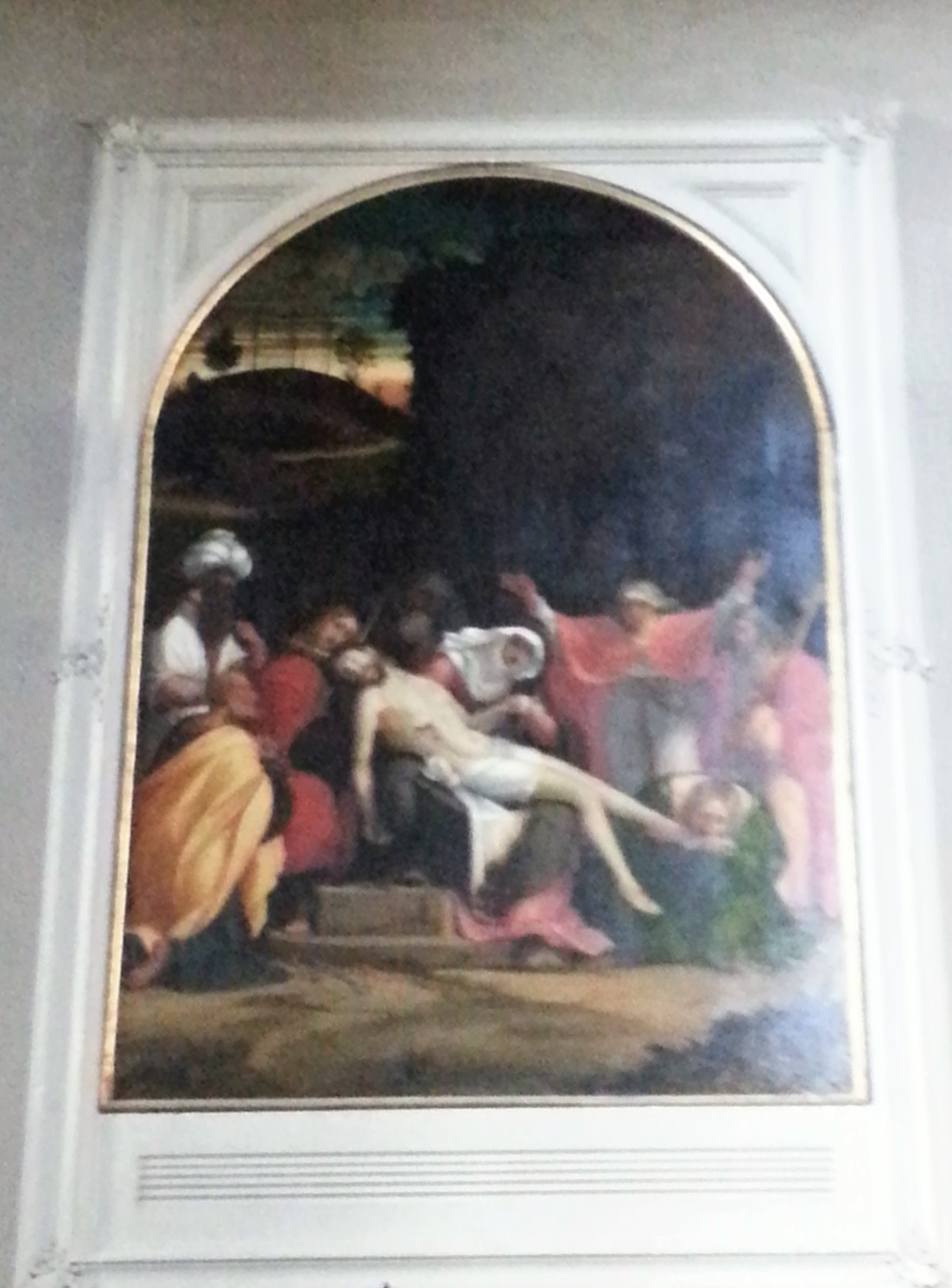
Lament over the Dead Christ (1524–1525) by Andrea Previtali

Lament over the Dead Christ is a 1524 or 1525 oil on canvas painting by Andrea Previtali, produced for the church of Sant’Andrea, Bergamo, where it still hangs.

One of the artist's last works, it was painted after his return to his birthplace of Bergamo, a phase during which he was heavily influenced by Albrecht Dürer, Albrecht Altdorfer and other German art, as also seen in The Crossing of the Red Sea and Crucifixion. It is considered one of his most intense paintings. It seems to be linked with the recited mystery plays popular at the time of its production as well as the work of the same title by Previtali's friend Lorenzo Lotto in Sant'Alessandro in Colonna, also in Bergamo. Lotto and Previtali's studios were next-door to each other near the church of San Michele al Pozzo Bianco, enabling them to compare and study each other's work.

== Bibliography ==
- Mauro Zanchi (2001). Andrea Previtali il colore prospettico di maniera belliniana (in Italian). Ferrari Editrice.
- Antonia Abbatista Finocchiaro (2001). La pittura bergamasca nella prima decina del cinquecento (in Italian). La Rivista di Bergamo.
