= The Assassination of Saint Peter Martyr =

The Assassination of Saint Peter Martyr may refer to:

- The Assassination of Saint Peter Martyr (Bellini)
- The Assassination of Saint Peter Martyr (Moretto)
- The Assassination of Saint Peter Martyr (Palma Vecchio)
