= The Entombment of Christ (Lotto) =

Painting by Lorenzo Lotto

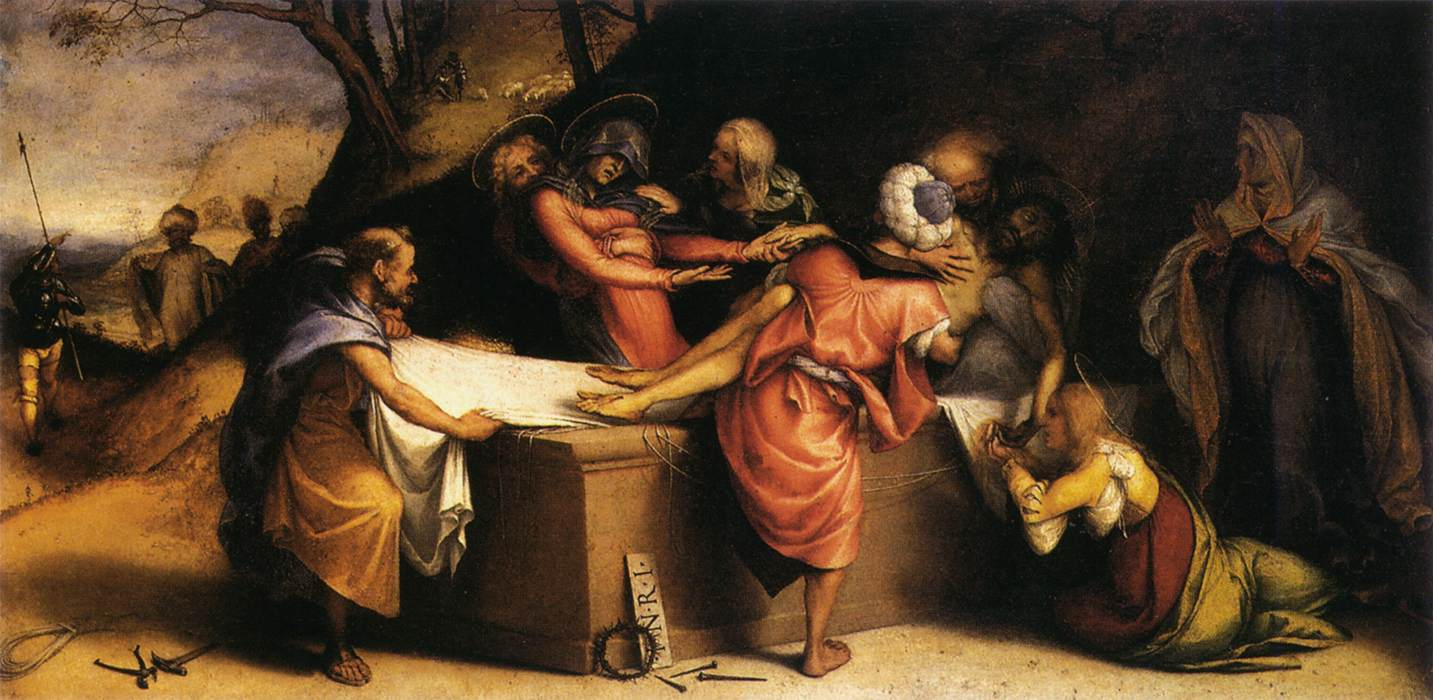
- Artist: Lorenzo Lotto
- Year: 1513–1516
- Medium: Oil on panel
- Dimensions: 51 cm × 97 cm (20 in × 38 in)
- Location: Accademia Carrara, Bergamo

The Entombment of Christ is a 1513–1516 oil-on-canvas painting by the Italian Renaissance artist Lorenzo Lotto, now in the Accademia Carrara in Bergamo. It originally formed the central predella panel (one of three) to the artist's Martinengo Altarpiece at the church of Santi Bartolomeo e Stefano.

== History ==
The Entombment of Christ was commissioned by Alessandro Martinengo Colleoni for the Dominicans in the church of Santo Stefano. The other predella paintings were Saint Dominic Reviving Napoleone Orsini and The Stoning of Saint Stephen, with The Entombment of Christ placed between them.

When the church and its monastery were destroyed to build the Venetian walls of Bergamo in 1561, the altarpiece was moved into the new church of Santi Bartolomeo e Stefano, but all three predellas were removed and moved elsewhere. The three predella panels were stolen in 1650, returned, and then moved to the church's sacristy. In 1749, however, the three panels were split up and sold to different buyers, ending their shared history. Finally, in 193, The Entombment was sold to the Accademia Carrara, where it is today.

== Description ==
In The Entombment, Lotto depicts a dramatic scene with details of devotion. Christ, removed from his cross, is placed into a tomb where, in the foreground, the instruments of his martyrdom are displayed. Placed in shadow, however, he does not occupy the center of the scene.

Instead, at center, a man seen from behind is carrying Christ's lifeless body while standing with one foot in the tomb. (A composition similar to Caravaggio's Entombment.) The man is wearing an orange vest bound at the waist by a white sash. Under the vest is a white shirt, and he wears a large turban. At the foot of the tomb, another man is dropping the sheet under the body, with difficulty. He wears a military uniform covered by a blue mantle, also bound at the waist, and leather sandels.

Also near the center, Mary is fainting from grief and supported by a woman behind her. Mary's blue mantle covers her face and lies over her red dress. She is holding the hand of Christ, and both are supported by another woman, who directs her gaze towards Mary. Joseph of Arimathea is also lifting the corpse, holding it by the torso, and placing it in the tomb. The daylight falling on him creates shadows around him. In the foreground and at right, Mary Magdalene, hooded, also holds the abandoned hand of Christ. Her clothes are brightly colored: under her red cape, she wears a yellow corset and a shirt with white puffed sleeves.

The Entombment, and the other predella paintings, are painted to reflect the Martinengo Altarpiece. The brown carpet at the foreground of the altarpiece mirrors the reddish-brown tints of the hilly landscape of The Entombment. The three paintings also reflect Lotto's encounter with the art of Raphael and German art, although they still correspond to his personal artistic style overall.

== Bibliography (in Italian) ==
- Francesca Cortesi Bosco, Il coro intarsiato di Lotto e Capoferri, edizioni Amilcare Pizzi, 1987, ISBN 88-366-0212-6.
- Andreina Franco Loiri Locatelli, La Rivista di Bergamo, 1998, p. 61–63.
- Carlo Pirovano, Lotto, Milano, Electa, 2002, ISBN 88-435-7550-3.
