= The Virgin and Child with a Shoot of Olive =

Painting by Andrea Previtali

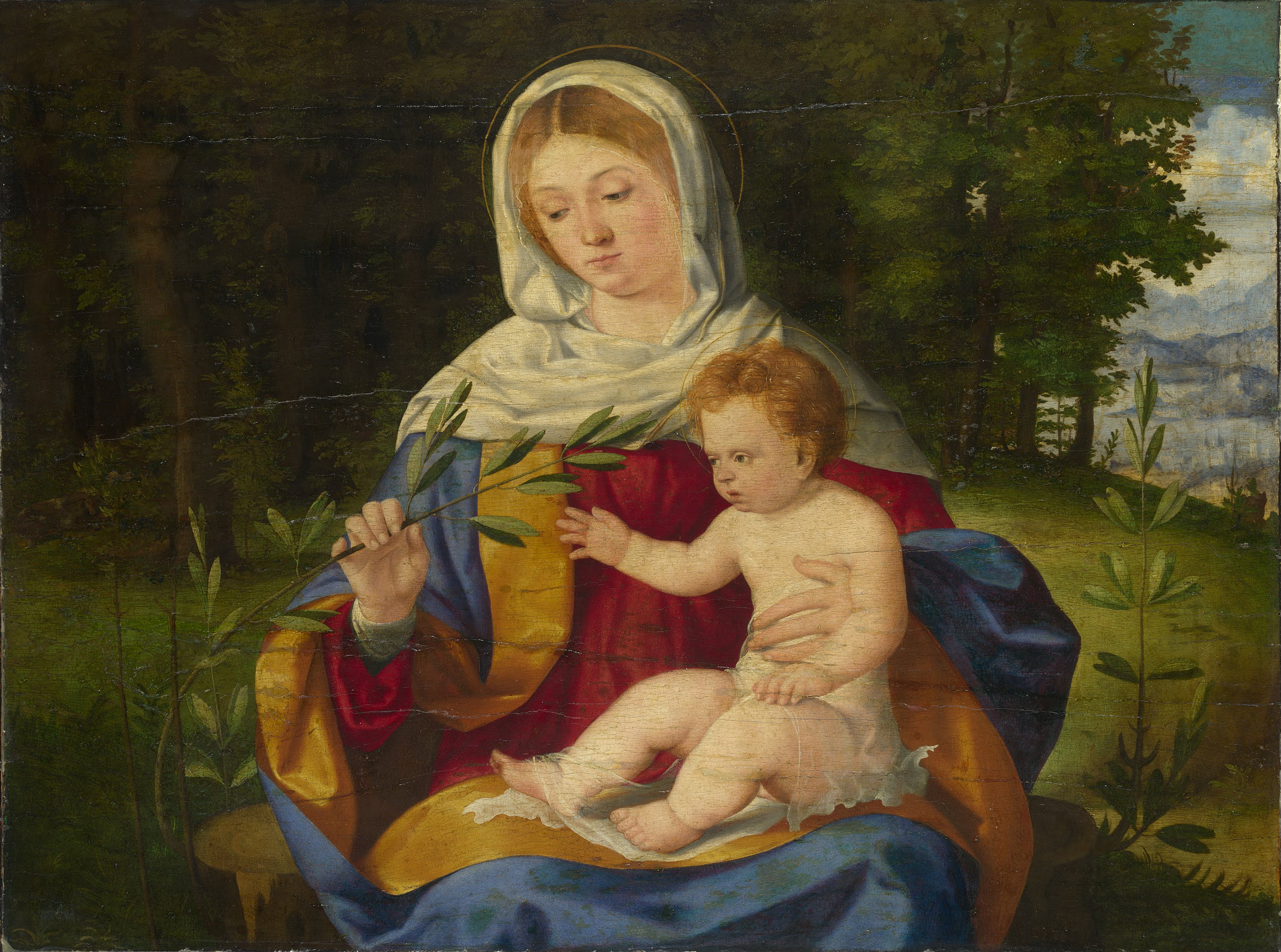
The Virgin and Child with a Shoot of Olive (1512–13) by Andrea Previtali

The Virgin and Child with a Shoot of Olive is an oil on panel painting by Andrea Previtali, executed in 1512–1513, one of 192 paintings donated to the National Gallery, London in 1910 as part of the George Salting collection. The work was originally commissioned by the Gozzi family.

== History ==
The painting is a work by Andrea Previtali commissioned by the Gozzi family in 1512–13, a period in which the artist, born in Bergamo but who had moved with his family to Venice at a young age and become a pupil of Giovanni Bellini, whose influence he strongly felt, had returned to his hometown. With the Venetian domination having created a new Bergamasque bourgeoisie that had enriched itself through the trade of woolen cloths and other goods, it became customary to commission paintings from new artists coming from Venice, both to ingratiate themselves with the new rulers and to emulate the prestigious old families of the city. The new families wanted to rise to prominence in city politics.

The Gozzi family originated from the Seriana Valley, and moved to Venice to engage in the trade of oil and leather. In 1445, Pezolo di Alzano had defended the Venetian Republic at his own expense during the war with Milan; Zanin Gozzi, who moved to Venice in 1515, was descended from this branch of the family. The family coat of arms consists of an olive tree growing in a field with a silver dove holding an olive branch in its beak. There seems to be little doubt about the commission of this painting, although it is believed that Previtali returned to Bergamo at the invitation of the Casotti de Mazzoleni family, who commissioned many paintings and the frescoes present in Palazzo Zogna from him.

== Description ==
The painting shows a young Previtali attempting to move away from the style of Bellini, his teacher, in order to develop his own artistic identity. Upon arriving in Bergamo, Previtali met another great Venetian artist, Lorenzo Lotto, who already possessed a well-defined artistic style and who would experience one of the best periods of his life in Bergamo, influencing Previtali in the process. It is precisely in the richness of the iconographic symbolism of the painting that the closeness between the two artists can be perceived.

The Madonna and Child occupy the central part of the painting between two severed olive tree trunks, which nonetheless show new shoots; symbolically, the painter wanted to indicate that the roots of peace always remain alive, even when there is no peace in a territory. In the early 1500s, until 1516, Bergamo suffered many sackings by the French, Spanish, and Milanese. 1512 was also the year that saw the end of the three-year French occupation, which was devastating for the city. The dense, dark forest behind the Virgin also depicts the violent times the city was experiencing, while the blue light visible on the right side of the canvas is a distant image. Both represent the difficult times the city was going through, but also the hope for a better future.

The Madonna holds a fresh olive branch in her right hand and offers it to the Child; this is also symbolically a gesture of peace that can only be achieved through the sacrifice of the son, but it is also a symbol of hope. The Madonna has a very young, almost childlike face, and the closeness between mother and child makes them seem almost as one. A white cloak, a symbol of purity, covers her head and shoulders, leaving visible the auburn color of her hair, which is echoed in the hair of her son. Yet the garment is rich; over a red dress, a wide overcoat is painted. Previtali studies the play of light and shadow, creating a work by a timid artist who would leave a strong mark of his presence in the city of Bergamo.

Previtali will undertake further work for the Gozzi family, the portrait being executed with Agostino Facheris, his pupil, for the Church of Santo Spirito in Bergamo.

== Bibliography ==
- (in Italian) Mauro Zanchi, Andrea Previtali il colore prospettico di maniera belliniana, Ferrari Editrice, 2009.
- (in Italian) Rodeschini Galati Maria Cristina, Andrea Previtali. La «Madonna Baglioni» e «Madonna con il bambino leggente tra san Domenico e santa Marta di Betania», Lubrina Editore, 2011, ISBN 978-88-7766-425-9.
