= Salvator Mundi (Previtali) =

1519 painting by Andrea Previtali

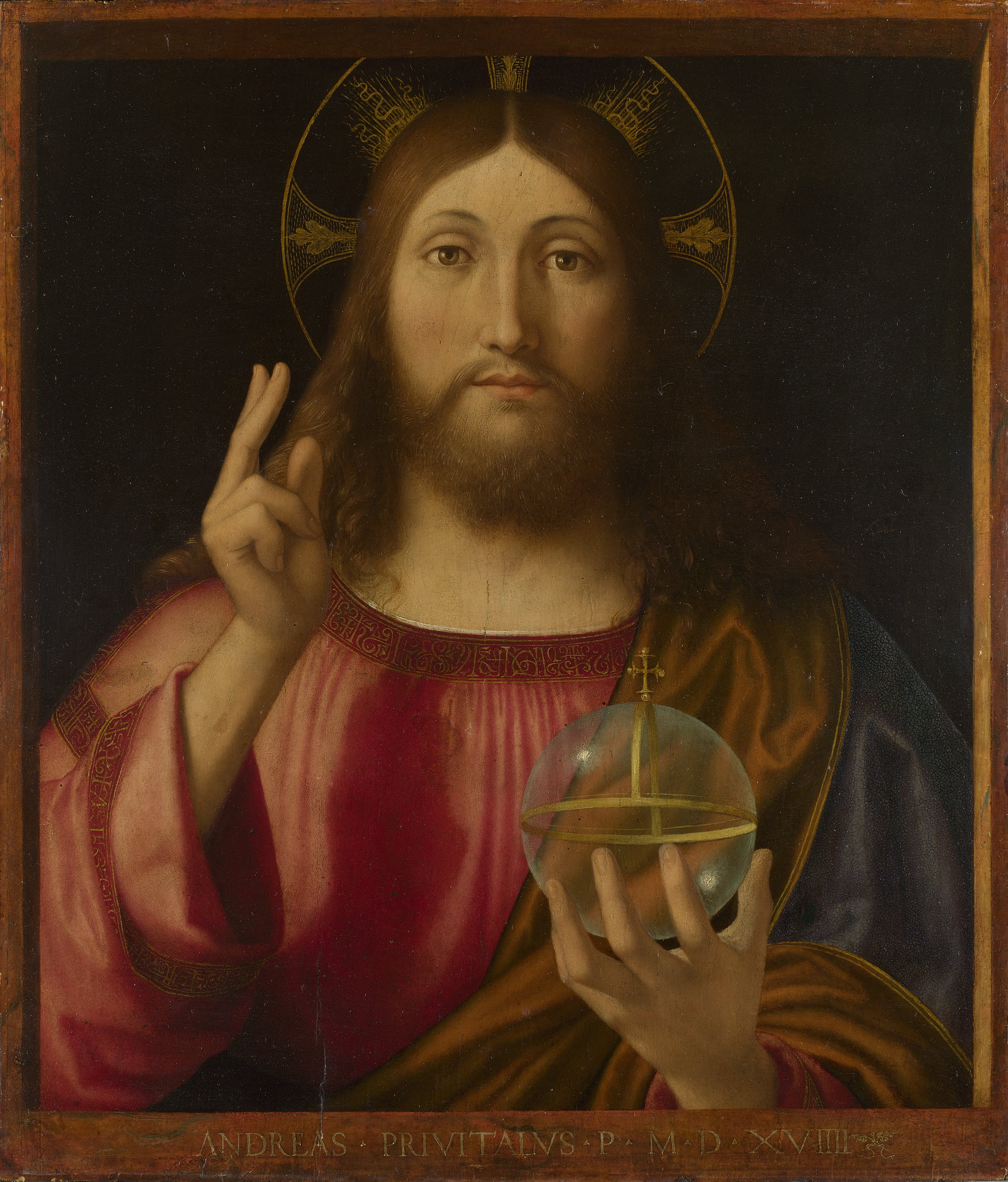
Salvator Mundi (1519) by Andrea Previtali

Salvator mundi is an oil on panel painting by Andrea Previtali, executed in 1519, now in the National Gallery, London, to which it was left in 1910. The work was produced in Bergamo.

== History ==
Andrea Previtali was born in Bergamo but moved at a young age with his family, who sold ropes and needles, to Venice, where he became a pupil of Giovanni Bellini and where he signed his first works as "Andrea Cordellaghi", perhaps to advertise his family's business. In 1512 he returned to Bergamo, along with some artists from the Venetian lagoon, who had been invited by the families of the new bourgeoisie to create altarpieces and portraits that would bring them to the attention of the Venetian authorities who governed the city.

In 1519, the artist probably had a good number of commissions, so much so that he had to move his workshop to a larger space. On November 13, 1519, in the presence of the notary Gianantonio Rota, he signed a lease for a property near the Church of San Michele al Pozzo Bianco, where Lorenzo Lotto also lived, paying three years' rent in advance for a cost of twenty-one lire. Among the first works painted in the new workshop was the Salvator Mundi, which has been in London since 1910 when it was acquired through the George Salting bequest.

== Description ==
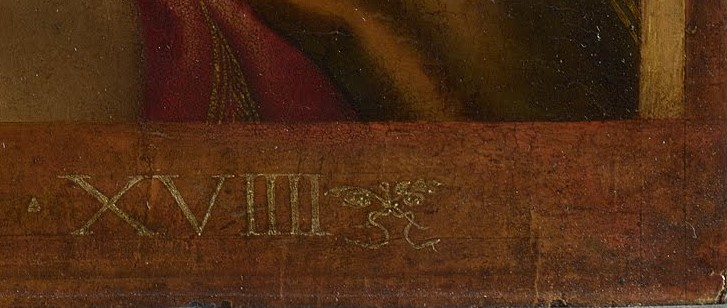
Detail of the signature placed on the frame of the painting

Several works on this subject were executed by Previtali. They were elaborations of prototypes from the Dutch school that circulated in Italy in the 16th century. The painting has the calligraphic characteristics typical of Flemish painting, which managed to illuminate with light the features of Christ's face, the folds of his garment, and the glass globe he holds in his left hand, while with his right hand the Savior is giving a blessing.

The painting reflects the poetic qualities found in the works of Antonello da Messina and his master Giovanni Bellini. In this work, once again, the artist demonstrates his great ability to reproduce, modify, and adapt the works of the most important painters of his time.

The frame bears the artist's signature on the lower part: ANDREAS PREVITALUS P.M.D.XVIII, along with two branches of palm and olive tied together with a ribbon. It was thought to be the signature that the artist wanted to affix to his works to make himself recognizable, because it is found in other works of his: the Blessing Christ in the National Gallery in London, the altarpiece of St John the Baptist with Four Saints in the Church of Santo Spirito, the cycle of paintings in Palazzo Zogna, and the Madonna and Child with Saint Sebastian and Saint Vincent Ferrer preserved at the Accademia Carrara.

== Bibliography ==
- (in Italian) Antonia Abbatista Finocchiaro, La pittura bergamasca nella prima decina del cinquecento, La Rivista di Bergamo, 2001.
