= Agostino Facheris =

Italian painter

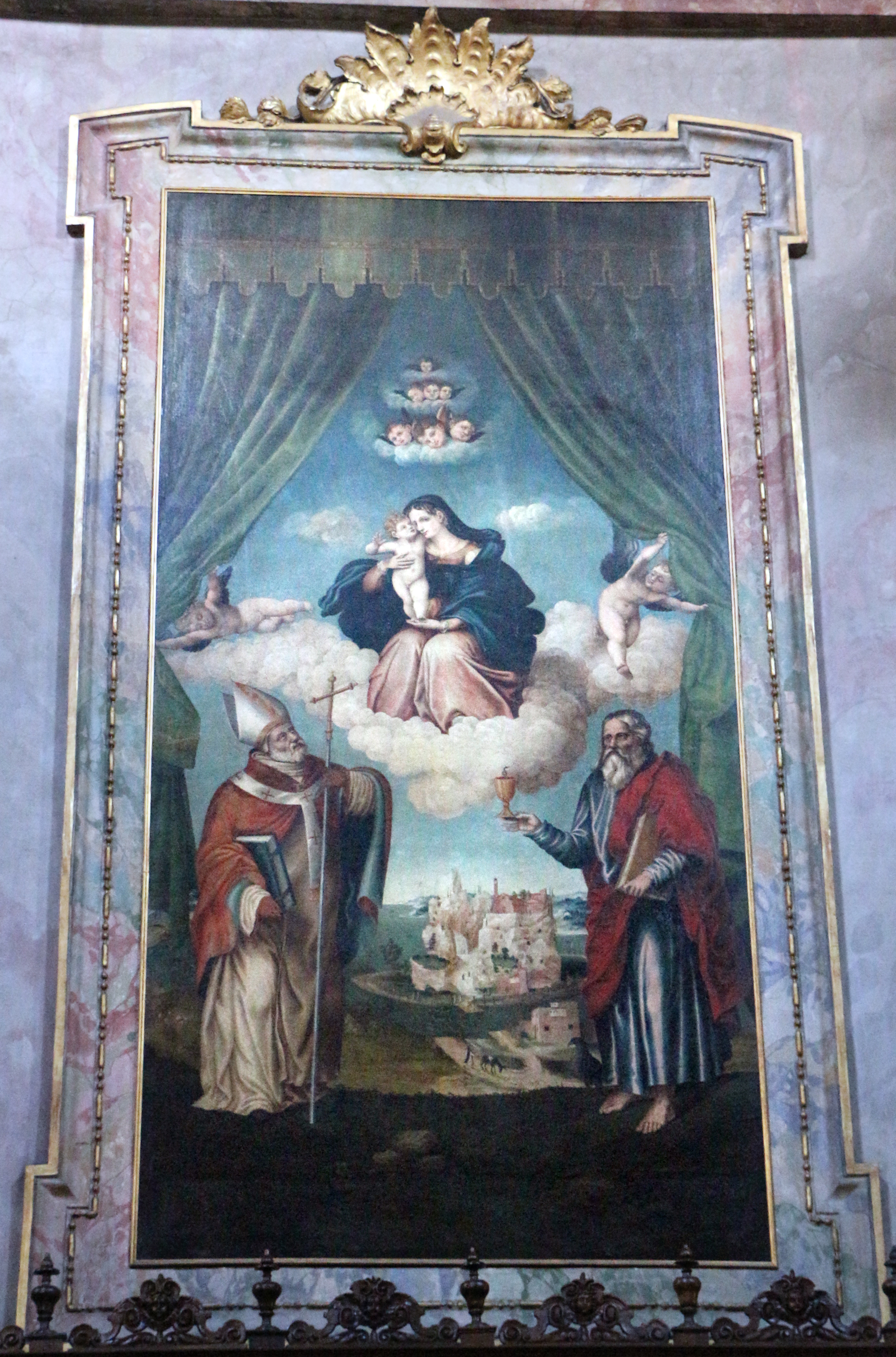
Madonna and Saints Bartholomew and Stephen

Agostino Facheris (16th-century) was an Italian painter, active in Bergamo, Italy. He was also known as il Caversegno after the contrada of Presezzo where he was born.

== Biography ==
Facheris was a pupil of Lorenzo Lotto and Andrea Previtali. He collaborated with the latter in completing the polyptych for the church of Santo Spirito in Bergamo. Other works include a Madonna and child with Saints (1536) for the parish church of Locatello and a polyptych (1537) for the parish church of Piazzatorre. He painted a Madonna and Saints for the church of San Bartolomeo of Bergamo; a St Sebastian and St Fabiano for the parish church of Sant'Alessandro della Croce. The panels of the Life of St Giuliano is held by the Galleria Nazionale d'Arte Antica in Rome.
