= Madonna and Child with Saint Dominic and Saint Martha of Bethany =

Painting by Andrea Previtali

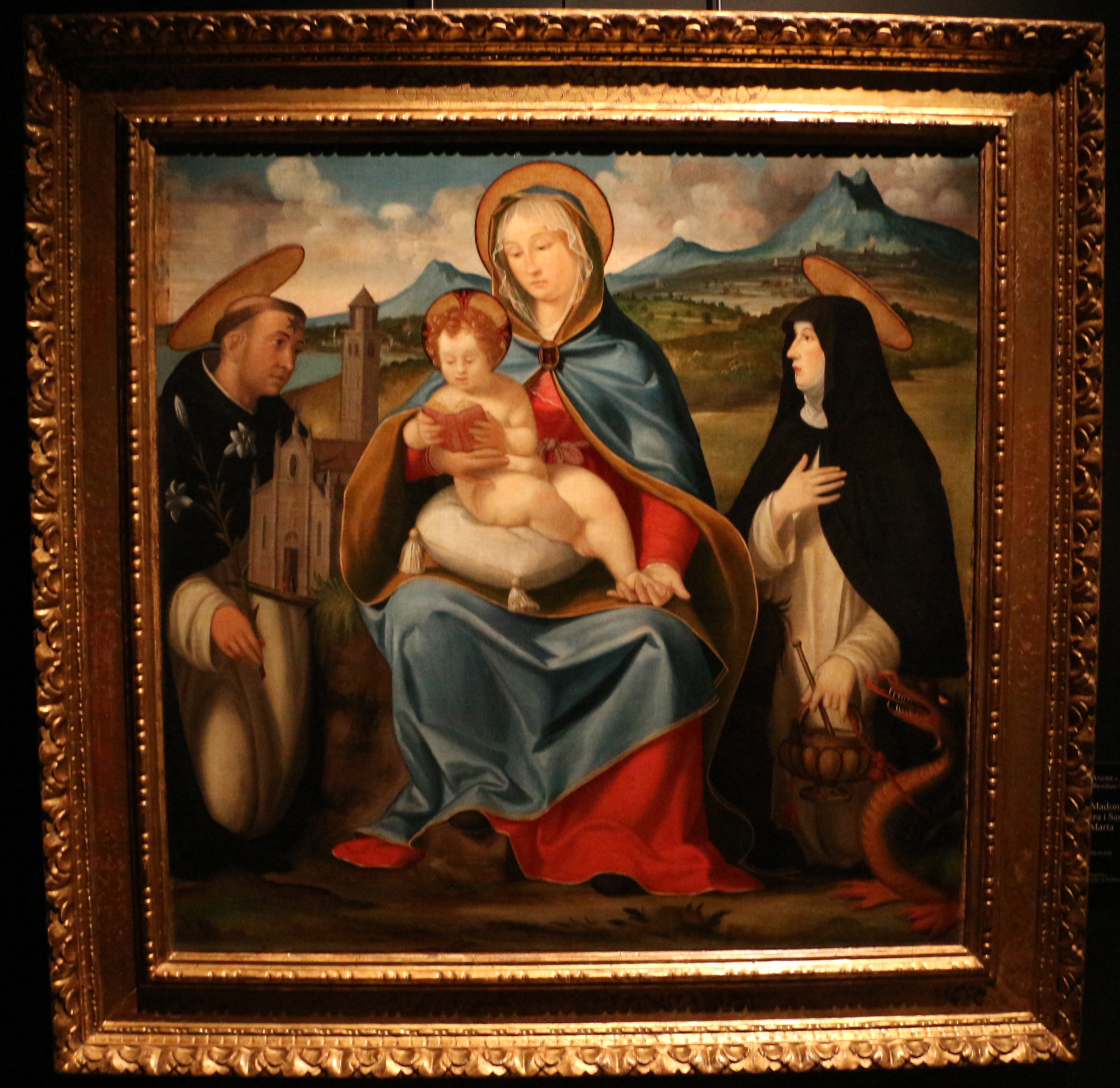
Madonna and Child with Saint Dominic and Saint Martha of Bethany (1517–1520) by Andrea Previtali

Madonna and Child with Saint Dominic and Saint Martha of Bethany is an oil painting on canvas executed ca. 1517–1520 by the Italian artist Andrea Previtali for the monastery of Santa Marta (dedicated to Saint Martha) in Bergamo. Since 2010 it is in the collections of the UBI Banca in Bergamo.

== History ==
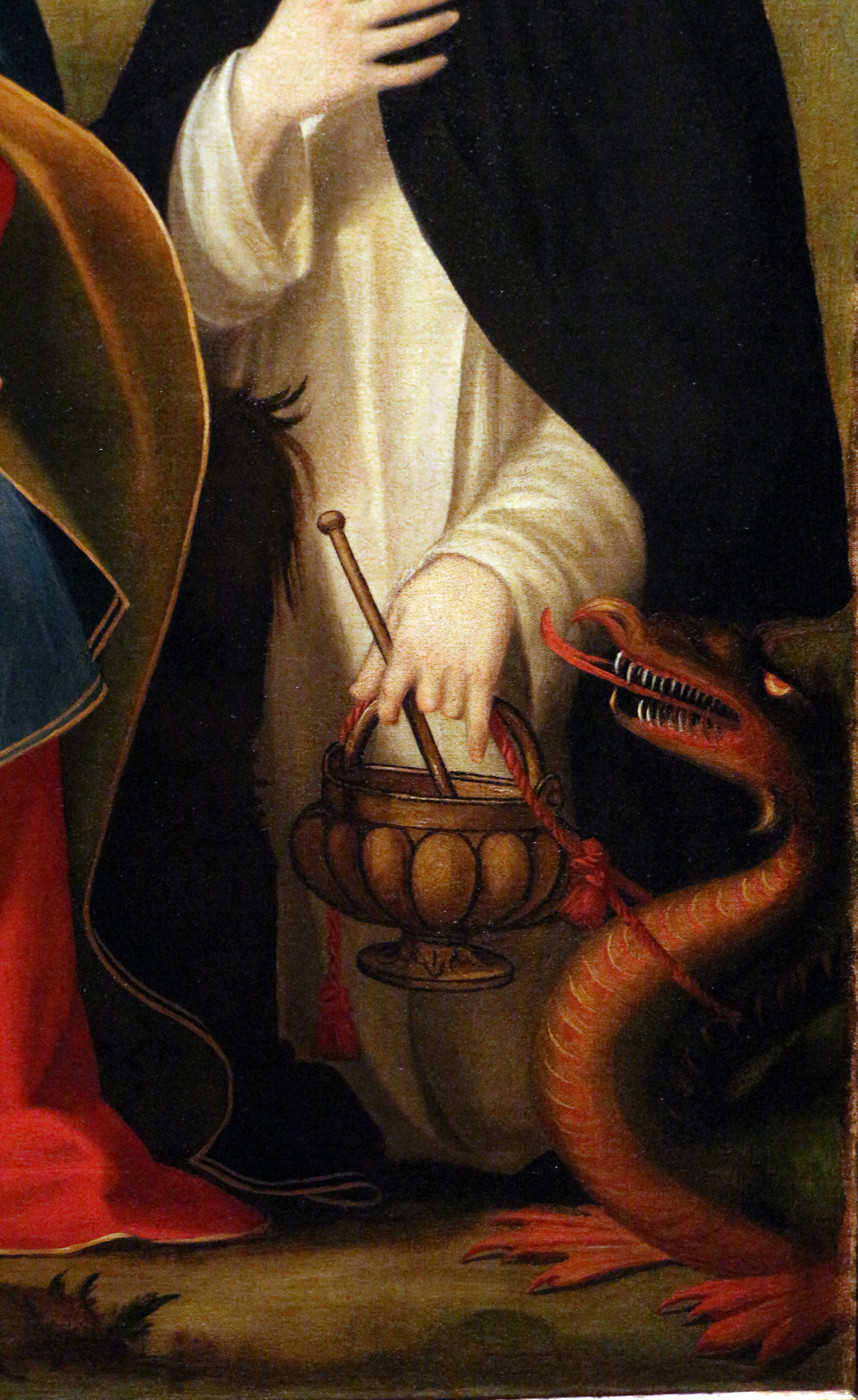
Detail of the Tarasque

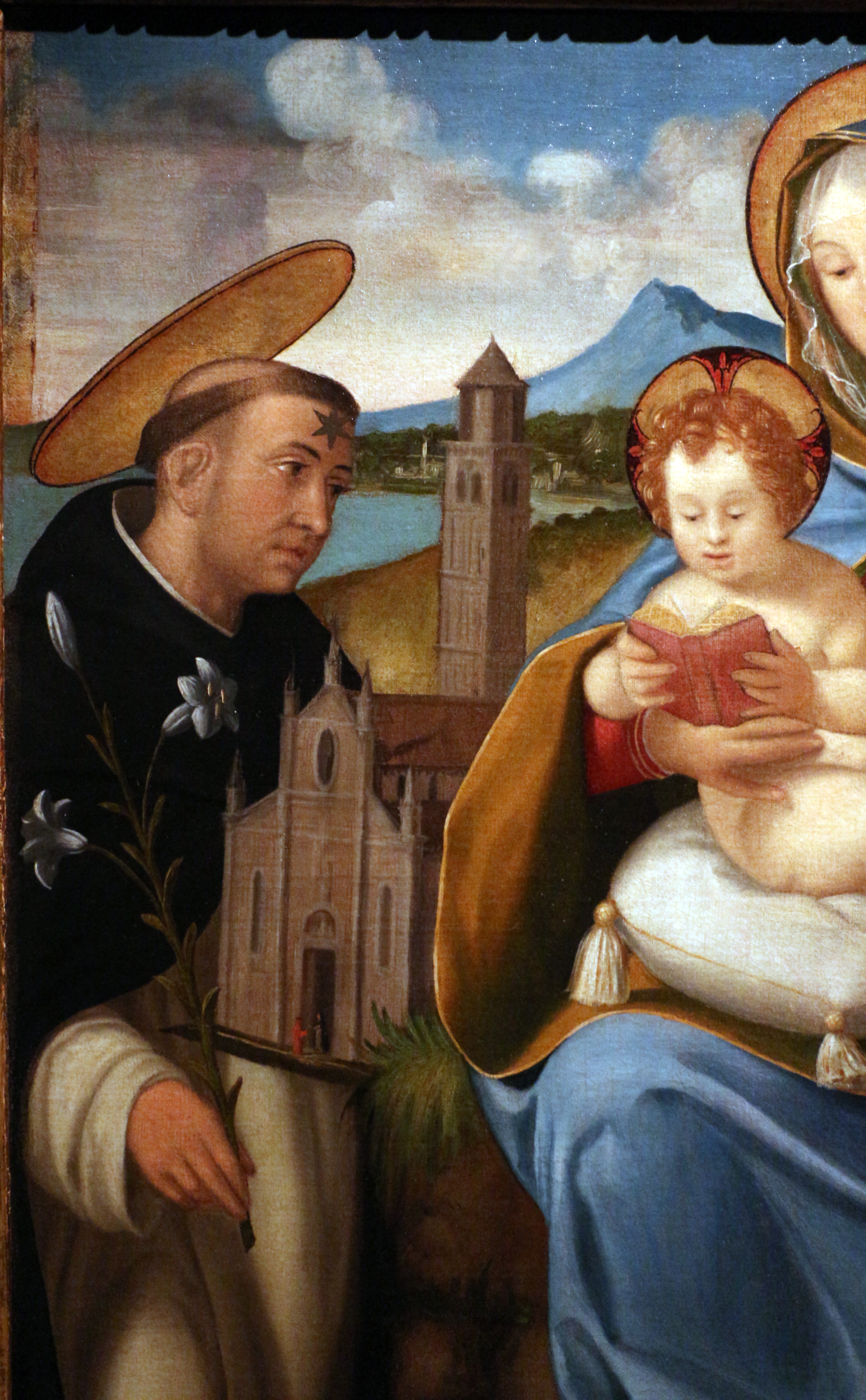
Detail of the model

No record of the work's commissioner survives, but other information on the work strongly suggests it was for the cell of a monk of the monastery of Santa Marta near the church of San Leonardo, such as its dimensions, too large for an ordinary private devotional altarpiece but too small for one commissioned by a church. Saint Martha has her usual attributes (a Tarasque and the bowl of holy water with which she tamed it) and wears a Dominican habit, whilst Saint Dominic on the left holds a model of a large three-naved 15th-century-style church, possibly representing the church of Santo Stefano in the city. This includes two figures in its doorway, possibly St Dominic himself and Saint Stephen in the red dalmatic of a deacon and a martyr. The artist had important contacts with the Dominicans of Bergamo which also led to a commission for an Annunciation fresco in Santo Stefano, lost in the church's destruction in 1561 to build the Venetian Walls

The art historian Carlo Marenzi also made a note on Vite de' pittori, scultori e architetti bergamaschi by Francesco Tassi describing the work as being in the home of Andrea Pasta, a historian active in Bergamo at the time of the monastery's suppression on 21 June 1798 and the French occupation and therefore in a position to save the work and his daughters:

The sisters, daughters of Dr. Andrea Pasta, former monk at Santa Marta, had a Blessed Virgin with two saints by this painter

The work then passed into Vincenzo Polli's collection until 1960, when it passed into a private collection and then to its present owners

== Description ==
This painting is one of the few executed on canvas by the artist. The early years of the 16th century marked the period when artists began to employ oil paints on canvas, which gradually replaced tempera on panel as the favored medium. For this work, the artist applied a layer of tempera paint before proceeding with oil paint.

The painting follows the classic typology of Giovanni Bellini’s Sacra Conversazione; it is small in scale, suitable for private devotion. Central to the composition is the image of the Virgin, seated upon a cube-shaped stone covered in grass and earth. She wears a rich, vibrant red gown that covers her down to her feet, cinched at the waist by a white ribbon. Her gown is draped with a light blue mantle, revealing the golden-yellow lining of its folds, which are fastened by a brooch adorned with a rectangular stone. A sheer white veil covers her shoulders and head. The Child sits upon a damask cushion—the very same depicted in the Baglioni Madonna—resting on His Mother's lap; He holds a small book in both hands, absorbed in reading. Beside them kneel two saints in adoration.

On the left is a depiction of Saint Dominic, wearing the habit of the Order of Preachers—which he founded in 1206—consisting of a black mantle over a white tunic. The star upon his forehead, a symbol of wisdom, and the branch of lilies, a symbol of chastity, are the attributes that identify him. He holds a model of a fifteenth-century church. On the right is a depiction of Saint Martha of Bethany, uniquely portrayed in the Dominican habit rather than the traditional secular attire. In her left hand, she holds a small bucket and a red leash to which is tethered a dragon with fiery eyes, which she keeps at bay. The saint, in fact, became renowned for having tamed a fearsome beast using holy water. This detail leaves no doubt regarding her identification, whereas her Dominican habit had previously given rise to a number of conflicting attributions. The veneration of the saint was introduced to the city of Bergamo by Blessed Venturino Cerasoli in the 14th century; he joined the Dominican friars at the former Convent of Santo Stefano and was accompanied by his sister, Catalina, who became a nun at the Convent of Santa Marta—consecrated on October 19, 1357.

The figures are set within a lush landscape that rises gently to reach the banks of a river flowing into a limpid lake. Higher up, a turreted city is depicted. The composition of the painting is the result of meticulous study, creating a harmonious representation in which the image of the Virgin stands at the apex of a scene that, nonetheless, unfolds with gentle grace. Saint Dominic holds a model of a large church, which obscures his right side. The painting, while approaching the Bellinian style, presents a mature Previtali—one who spent intense years of work in Bergamo, studying works such as Lotto's Martinengo Altarpiece.

=== The model of the church ===
Of paramount importance is the small model of a church—architecturally dating to the 15th century—that Saint Dominic holds. It depicts a large church with three naves and a façade articulated by pilasters culminating in pinnacles, featuring two basket-arch openings and a rose window. Above the church portal, two figures are sketched: one wearing the black habit over a white tunic characteristic of the Dominicans, and the other clad in a flamboyant red garment. It is believed that the figures depicted may be Saint Dominic and Saint Stephen—the latter portrayed wearing the red dalmatic of a deacon and martyr. This suggests that the painting is a depiction of how the Church of Santo Stefano appeared during the early years of the 16th century—a church that was demolished in 1561 to make way for the construction of Porta San Giacomo and the Venetian Walls. The artist knew the church well; indeed, he had executed the lost fresco of the Annunciation there. Very similar is the depiction by an anonymous artist for the Matris Domini Monastery, which presents Saint Dominic alongside Saints Agatha and Roch, flanked by two worshippers—confirming the affinity that existed in the early 16th century among the three monasteries: Matris Domini and Santa Marta, together with Santo Stefano.

== Bibliography ==
- Antonia Abbatista Finocchiaro (2001). La pittura bergamasca nella prima decina del cinquecento (in Italian). La Rivista di Bergamo.
- Rodeschini Galati Maria Cristina (2011). Andrea Previtali. La "Madonna Baglioni" e "Madonna con il bambino leggente tra san Domenico e santa Marta di Betania" (in Italian). Lubrina Editore. ISBN 978-88-7766-425-9.
