= Salvator Mundi (disambiguation) =

Salvator Mundi, Latin for Savior of the World, is a subject in iconography depicting Christ.

Salvator Mundi may also refer to:

- Salvator Mundi (Leonardo), c. 1499–1510 painting by Leonardo da Vinci
- Salvator Mundi (Palma Vecchio), c. 1518–1522 painting by Palma Vecchio
- Salvator Mundi (Previtali), 1519 painting by Andrea Previtali

== Music ==
- Salvator mundi salva nos, 16th century composition by Giovanni Pierluigi da Palestrina
- Jesu Salvator Mundi, 20th century composition by Vito Carnevali
- Jesu Salvator Mundi, 2024 single by Janalynn Castelino
