= The Assassination of Saint Peter Martyr (Moretto) =

Painting by Moretto da Brescia, c. 1530

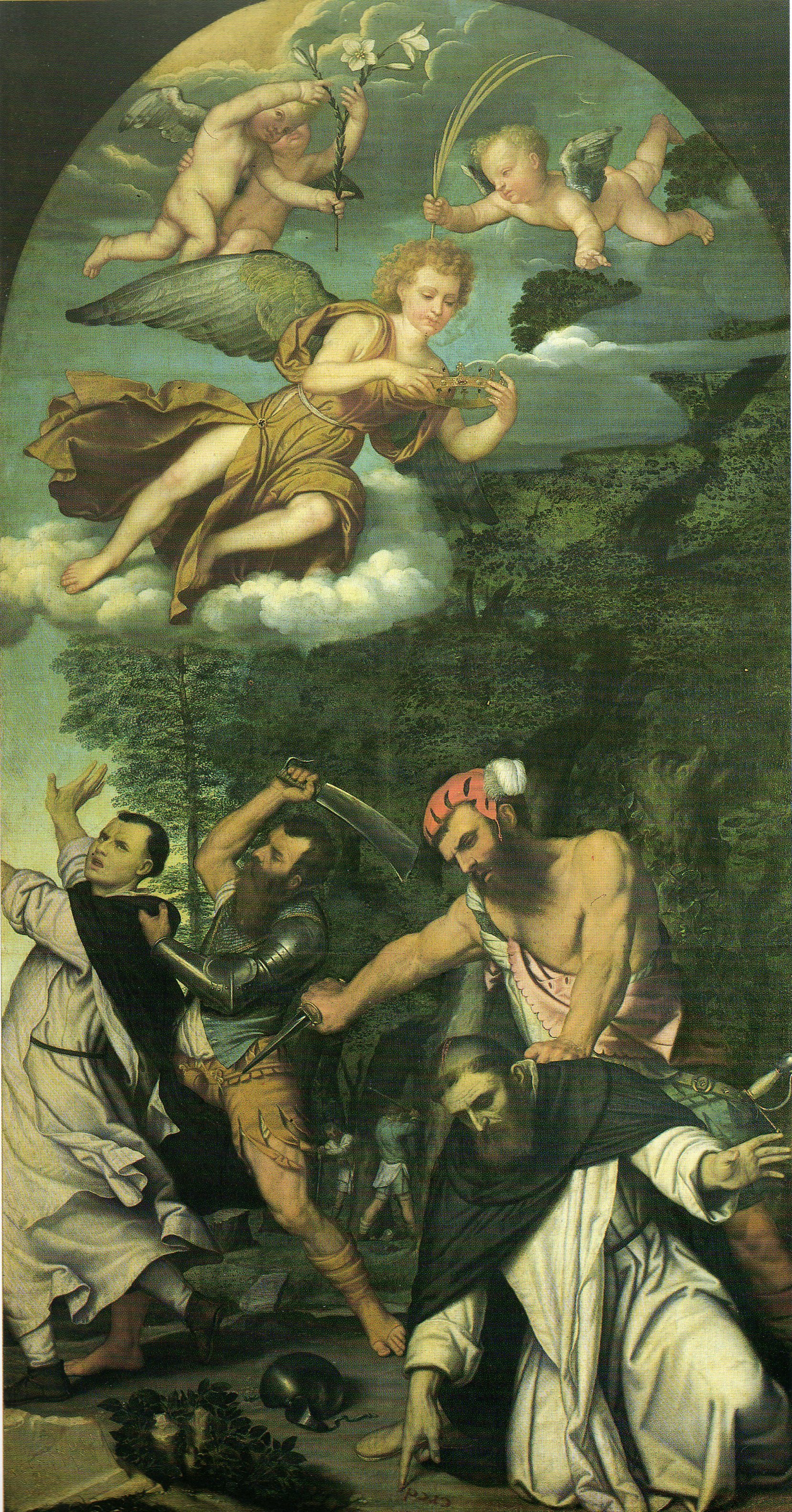
- The Assassination of Saint Peter Martyr (1530-1535) by Moretto da Brescia
- Year: 1530–1535
- Medium: Oil on canvas
- Dimensions: 310 cm × 163 cm (120 in × 64 in)
- Location: Pinacoteca Ambrosiana, Milan

The Assassination of Saint Peter Martyr or The Martyrdom of Saint Peter of Verona is a 1530–1535 oil on canvas painting by Moretto da Brescia, now in the Sala dell'Esedra in the Pinacoteca Ambrosiana in Milan.

The painting was influenced by Titian and Vincenzo Foppa, particularly Foppa's fresco of the same subject in the Portinari Chapel in Milan, whilst it was itself the model for Caravaggio's 1600 The Martyrdom of Saint Matthew.

== History ==
The canvas was made after 1530 for the Grumelli chapel in the chiesa dei Santi Stefano e Domenico of Bergamo, along with three other paintings made for the chapel's predella and most likely depicting other episodes in the life of Saint Peter of Verona. In 1561, the church was demolished during a plan to expand the city walls of Bergamo, conducted by the Venetian Republic. The Grumelli family transferred the trappings of their chapel to the chiesa di San Francesco d'Assisi. There, they occupied a chapel previously dedicated to Saint Gall, which was then rededicated to Saint Peter. The relocation of the artworks and decorations, including the paintings of Moretto, was completed by 1567. The polyptych is described as still intact in the new chapel's original cornice by Andrea Pasta in 1775, who mentioned the predella's "sacred stories".

With the 1797 suppression of religious orders by proclamation in the Cisalpine Republic, this second church was also set for demolition and the Grumellis sought a new location for their family chapel. The Assassination of Saint Peter Martyr, as reported by Carlo Fachinetti in 1822, was relocated to "its owner's house". The predella paintings likely followed it as well, since a detailed inventory of the Grumelli family completed in 1818 named three small paintings depicting the life of Saint Peter Martyr. By that time, however, the central painting had already into the collection of Teodoro Lechi of Brescia. It appeared in an index of his collection in 1814, and then again in 1824.

The painting was then sold in 1829 to the count Giovanni Edoardo Pecis of Milan. His sister, Maria Pecis, then donated the work to the Pinacoteca Ambrosiana, where it still is today. The final destination of the three accompanying predella paintings is unknown.

== Description ==
The painting depicts the martyrdom of Peter of Verona, who was killed in 1252 in the forest of Barlassina. Moretto follows traditional iconography, which shows the saint writing on the earth, with his own blood, the word "Credo" (lit. 'I believe'). Behind him, Carino of Balsamo prepares to deliver the final blow with a dagger while, at left, one of Peter's traveling companions is also killed. The upper section of the painting is occupied by four angels on clouds. The angel in the foreground bears a crown, another a palm of martyrdom, and the last two lilies, symbols of purity.

In the background of the scene, a thicket of trees represents the forest where the martyrdom took place. Among the shade of the trees, at the center of the painting, there are two carpenters. One is intent on his work, and the other is turning to look at the martyrdom.

== Style ==
Contemporary critics have agreed that the work is likely dateable to between 1530 and 1535. The dating of the painting, however, has been controversial. From the first study by Stefano Fenaroli in 1877 to the most recent by Pier Virgilio Begni Redoni in 1988, hypotheses have been proposed from anywhere between 1520 and 1544, practically the entire length of Moretto's career. The painting has been described as both a youthful, immature work and as the result of an experienced painter—there are no stylistic elements of the work that help to establish a correct date.

The question was nearly resolved in 1981 by Maria Cristina Rodeschini, who discovered unpublished documents in the Grumelli archive. The documents state that on May 14, 1526, Marcantonio Grumelli sought Anselmo Cortesi, a master engraver, to prepare a marble tomb based on a design by Jacopino degli Scipioni for Marcantonio's brother Pietro. Pietro Grumelli, the previous year, had dedicated money to the family chapel in the chiesa dei Santi Stefano e Domenico. Three years later, Marcantonio Grumelli again commissioned Jacopino degli Scipioni to decorate the chapel with frescoes. Rodeschini concluded, then, that the main work on the chapel ended after 1530. From that point on, the Grumellis would have commissioned Moretto to paint The Assassination of Saint Peter Martyr for the chapel. That period also coincides with Moretto's presence in Bergamo, where he was commissioned by Lorenzo Lotto to complete frescoes for the basilica of Santa Maria Maggiore. Another possible contact between Marcantonio Grumelli and Moretto would have come in 1534, when the painter was commissioned to complete Madonna and Child Enthroned with Saints in the church of Sant'Andrea in Bergamo: the Grumellis contributed money to that work as well.

The work demonstrates a dramatic expression of movement rendered with traditional tones of color and through figures in the background. The landscape exhibits elements of "spontaneity and lyrical sentiment", art historian Panazza observed. This combination reflects the style of Moretto and deviates from the work in the Portinari Chapel. Moretto was likely influenced by the frescoes of Vincenzo Foppa in the Portinari Chapel in Milan, as well Titian, who painted an altarpiece with similar angel figures in 1530.

Robert Longhi, in 1929, while researching the models of Caravaggio, suggested that The Assassination of Saint Peter Martyr might have been a reference for Caravaggio's The Martyrdom of Saint Matthew.

== Bibliography ==
- (in Italian) Roberto Longhi, Quesiti caravaggeschi - II, I precedenti, in "Pinacotheca", anno 1, numeri 5-6, March–June 1929
