= Madonna and Child with Saint Sebastian and Saint Vincent Ferrer =

1506 painting by Andrea Previtali

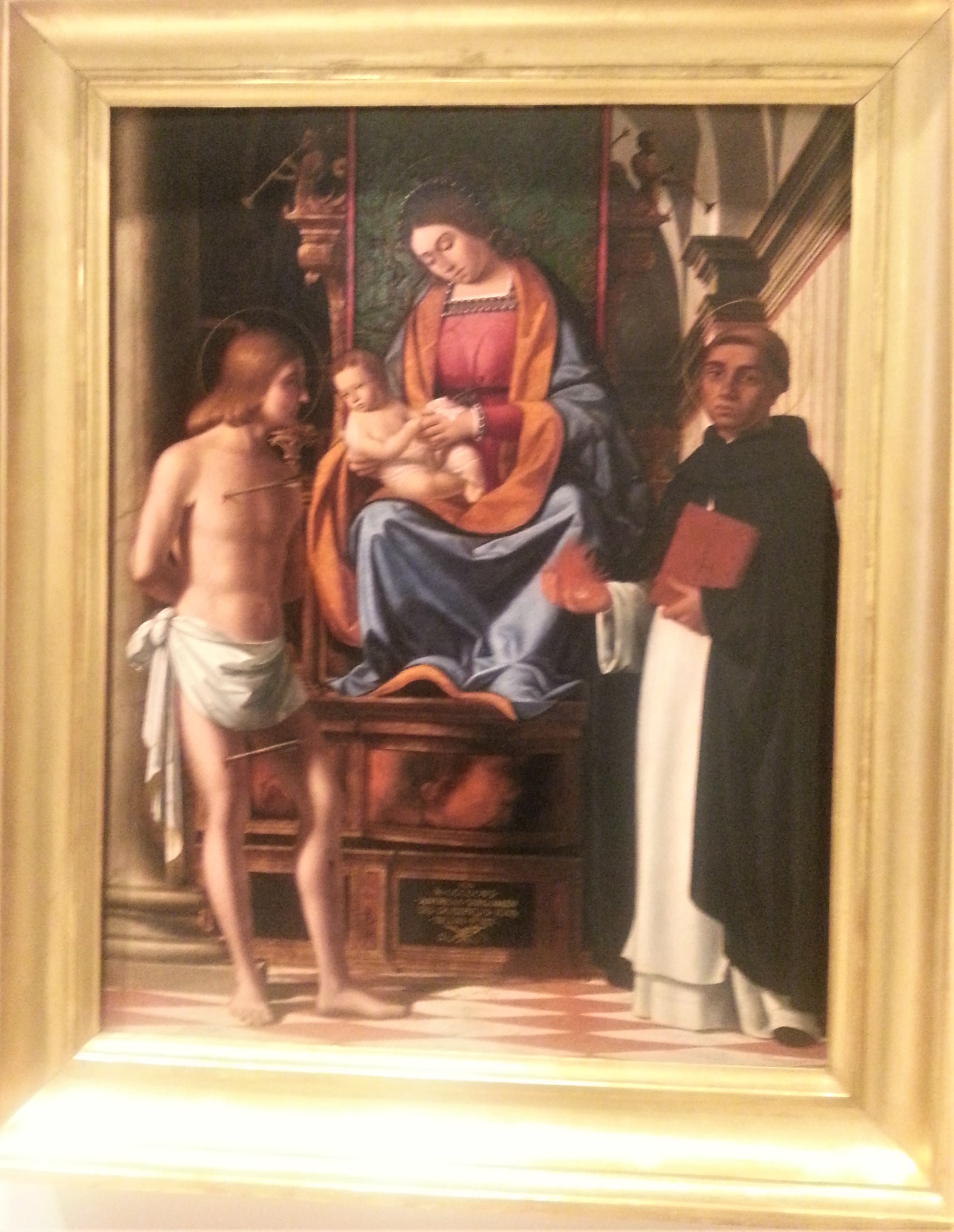
Madonna and Child with Saint Sebastian and Saint Vincent Ferrer (1506) by Andrea Previtali

Madonna and Child with Saint Sebastian and Saint Vincent Ferrer or Madonna and Child with Saint Sebastian and Saint Thomas Aquinas is an oil on panel painting by Andrea Previtali. It was produced in 1506 in Venice while he was still in the studio of Giovanni Bellini and is contemporary with the same artist's Madonna and Child (Museum of Fine Arts (Budapest)). It is now in the Accademia Carrara in Bergamo, to which it passed from Guglielmo Lochis's collection in 1866.

The saint on the right is not definitively identified and lacks the traditional attributes of either St Thomas Aquinas or St Vincent Ferrer. The work is signed ANDREAS, NERGOMENSIS. DISSIPULUS IOVA.BELINI.P.XIT and dated MCCCCCVI, both on the base of the Madonna's marble throne. The signature is followed by a palm branch and an olive branch bound by a ribbon, a symbol which also appears on the artist's St John the Baptist with Four Saints (church of Santo Spirito, Bergamo), the picture cycle for palazzo Zogna and Christ Blessing (National Gallery, London). Also on the throne's base is a symbol, possibly YHS (the trigram of Bernardino of Siena) or more likely VHS (Virgini Hominum Servatrici or To the Virgin, Servant of Mankind).

The panel is of limited size, and although it has the typical characteristics of an altarpiece, it appears to be a painting intended for a private room, created for some unknown Venetian patron.

The backrest of the throne is adorned at the top with two tritons playing long trumpets, comparable to the engravings of Nicoletto da Modena, and a stiff drapery is placed behind the Virgin, extending to the edge of the canvas, a divine link between earth and heaven. The Madonna's head is tilted towards the Child, the same posture as in the painting "Madonna and Child" preserved in Budapest, which was executed at the same time. Saint Sebastian is leaning against a marble column and is in conversation with the Child Jesus. The two figures are painted in close proximity, almost in an intimate dialogue; two perfectly perpendicular arrows pierce him in the side and in his right leg. In the depiction of the saint and in the shadows cast upon his legs, one can see the maturity the artist has now achieved. The saint to the left of the Madonna, perhaps Vincent Ferrer, holds flames in his right hand and a book with a red cover in his left. Detaching himself from the intimacy of the scene, he looks towards the observer, a detail reminiscent of the depiction of the saint in Lotto's Recanati Polyptych, which, however, dates from a later period. The overall composition is therefore well-prepared and arranged in a solid perspective, giving the observer a sense of perfect geometric order.

== Bibliography ==
- Mauro Zanchi (2001). Andrea Previtali il colore prospettico di maniera belliniana (in Italian). Ferrari Editrice.
- Antonia Abbatista Finocchiaro (2001). La pittura bergamasca nella prima decina del cinquecento (in Italian). La Rivista di Bergamo.
- "Madonna col Bambino in trono tra i santi Sebastiano e Vincenzo Ferrer (o Tommaso d'Aquino ?)" (in Italian). Accademia Carrara.
