= Giovanni di Giacomo Gavazzi =

Italian painter

Giovanni di Giacomo Gavazzi, also called Giacomo Gavasio (16th-century) was an Italian painter of the Renaissance style.

He was a native of Poscante, in the valley of Brembana. He appears to have trained and worked mainly in Bergamo early in the 16th century, but few records exist. He is the author of five arched panels with figures of the Apostles, and of three paintings in tempera of half-length figures of Saints and Bishops in couples, on a gold ground, in the Lochis-Carrara Gallery in Bergamo. There is also a painting by him of The Virgin crowned by Angels, dated 1512, in the church of Sant' Alessandro in Colonna.
