= Saint John the Baptist Among Other Saints =

1515 painting by Andrea Previtali

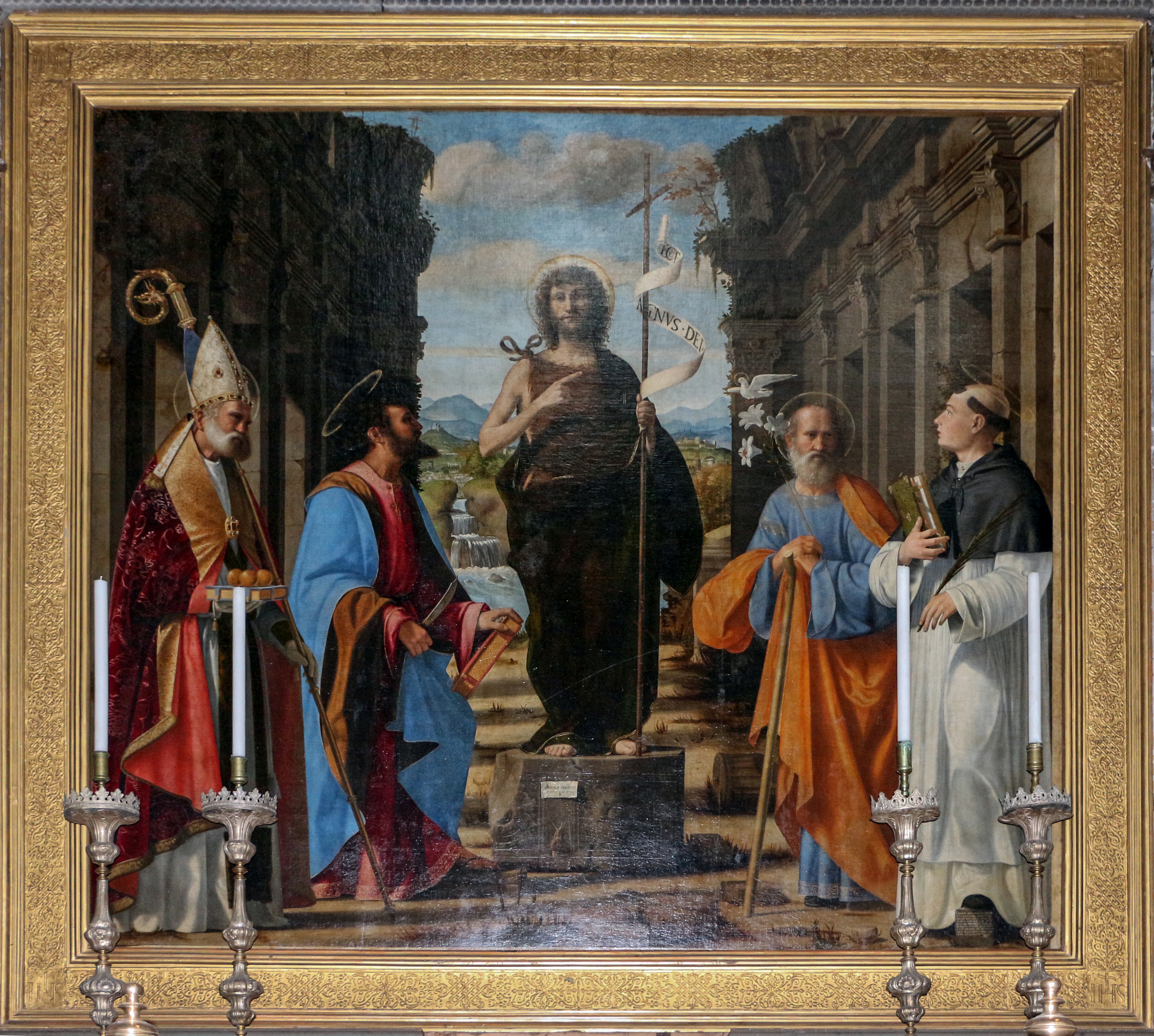
St John the Baptist with Four Saints (1515) by Andrea Previtali

St John the Baptist with Four Saints or St John the Baptist Among Other Saints is a 1515 oil on canvas painting by Andrea Previtali, displayed in the first side-chapel on the north side of the nave of the church of Santo Spirito in Bergamo, the artist's birthplace. It was the artist's first public commission after his return to Bergamo from Venice.

The work shows (left to right) Nicholas of Bari (referring to the commissioners' generosity), Saint Bartholomew (an apostle of Jesus, and in reference to Bartolomeo Casotti de Mazzoleni, one of the work's commissioners along with his brother Giacomo), John the Baptist (patron of the Lateran Canons who had recently taken over the running of Santo Spirito), Blessed Giacomo da Bergamo (to whom the Lateran Canons had a particular devotion) and Saint Joseph (a patron saint of the city).

== History ==
Previtali—a native of Bergamo who had spent a long period in Venice, where he had accompanied his father and studied under Giovanni Bellini—arrived in Bergamo in 1512, around the same time Lorenzo Lotto appeared in the city. A relationship of mutual respect developed between the two painters; indeed, Lotto not only described Previtali as a "man to be trusted implicitly", but was also the only one to whom he entrusted the trimming of the drawings for the choir-stall intarsia—created in 1526 by Giovan Francesco Capoferri—for the Basilica of Santa Maria Maggiore in Bergamo.

The first commission he received upon arriving in Bergamo was the creation of the Saint Sigismund triptych for the church of Santa Maria di Sotto—later housed in the church of Santa Maria del Conventino. The following year, he was invited by the brothers Bartolomeo and Giovanni Casotti de Mazzoleni—wealthy merchants who would commission more than one work from the artist—to create a canvas that would be his first public work in the city of Bergamo. He had already executed the frescoes at Villa Zogna for Paolo Casotti.

The painting was intended for the chapel designed by Pietro Isabello; Previtali signed and dated the work 1515, placing a small placard on the pedestal supporting John the Baptist.

== Description ==
The central part of the painting depicts Saint John the Baptist standing on a pedestal; in his left hand, he holds a banner wrapped around its staff, bearing the inscription "ECCE AGNVS DEI" (Behold the Lamb of God), while four saints—two on each side—flank him. The painting features the traditional pyramidal composition characteristic of 15th-century Venetian art, although Previtali tended to move closer to the style of Lorenzo Lotto—who was working on the Martinengo Altarpiece—while always maintaining a personal touch.

The saints depicted in the painting had to satisfy the requirements of the patrons and the religious context. Saint John the Baptist, positioned in the center, is the patron saint of the Lateran Canons, who had recently taken over the administration of the church. Flanking the central figure are the saints: Saint Nicholas of Bari, a bishop depicted to signify the generosity of the Casotti family—for the saint had saved young women condemned for prostitution due to dire poverty, and was also the patron saint of sailors and merchants, as well as the saint to whom Bartolomeo was devoted (a man constantly on the move in search of new markets and buyers). Saint Bartholomew depicted because he is the namesake of the client. Blessed James of Bergamo, archdeacon (not to be confused with Saint James the Great), of whom the canons were devoted, a cubic stone placed at his feet bears the inscription Jacobus Bergomensis canoni cur regulari Christu pre dicans pro dura impte he reseos castigatione fus ibus ad arriana turba pe rcursus martir efficitur CCCLXXX et in sacra divi Alexandri edecon itus requiescit. This final image of Saint Joseph is dedicated to the city that designated him as its patron in the 15th century, following Lenten sermons delivered in local churches by Girolamo di Piacenza. The saint is depicted with both hands resting on his staff and holding three flowering lilies—symbols of purity, humility, and honesty—the virtues that led God to choose him as the foster father of His Son.

On the base where the Baptist is placed, there is a small label bearing the inscription "ANDREAS PRIVITALUS PINXIT M.D.XV". The snail placed on the pedestal has symbolic importance as the snail is a creature that appears after the rain. Placing it directly beneath John the Baptist signifies rebirth through the sacrament of baptism and the eternity of a new life.

The scene unfolds in a church that appears to be in ruins and evokes a Venetian atmosphere—recalling the work of the Bellini workshop—yet it signifies the church's rebirth from the ruins of the world, heralding an era of peace and prosperity.

== Bibliography ==
- Franesco Colalucci (1998). Bergamo negli anni di Lotto; Pittura, guerra e società (in Italian).
- Antonia Abbatista Finocchiaro (2001). La pittura bergamasca nella prima decina del cinquecento (in Italian). La Rivista di Bergamo.
- Mauzo Zanchi (2001). Andrea Previtali il coloritore prospettico di maniera belliniana (in Italian). Ferrari Editrixe.
