= Lament over the Dead Christ (Lotto) =

Painting by Lorenzo Lotto

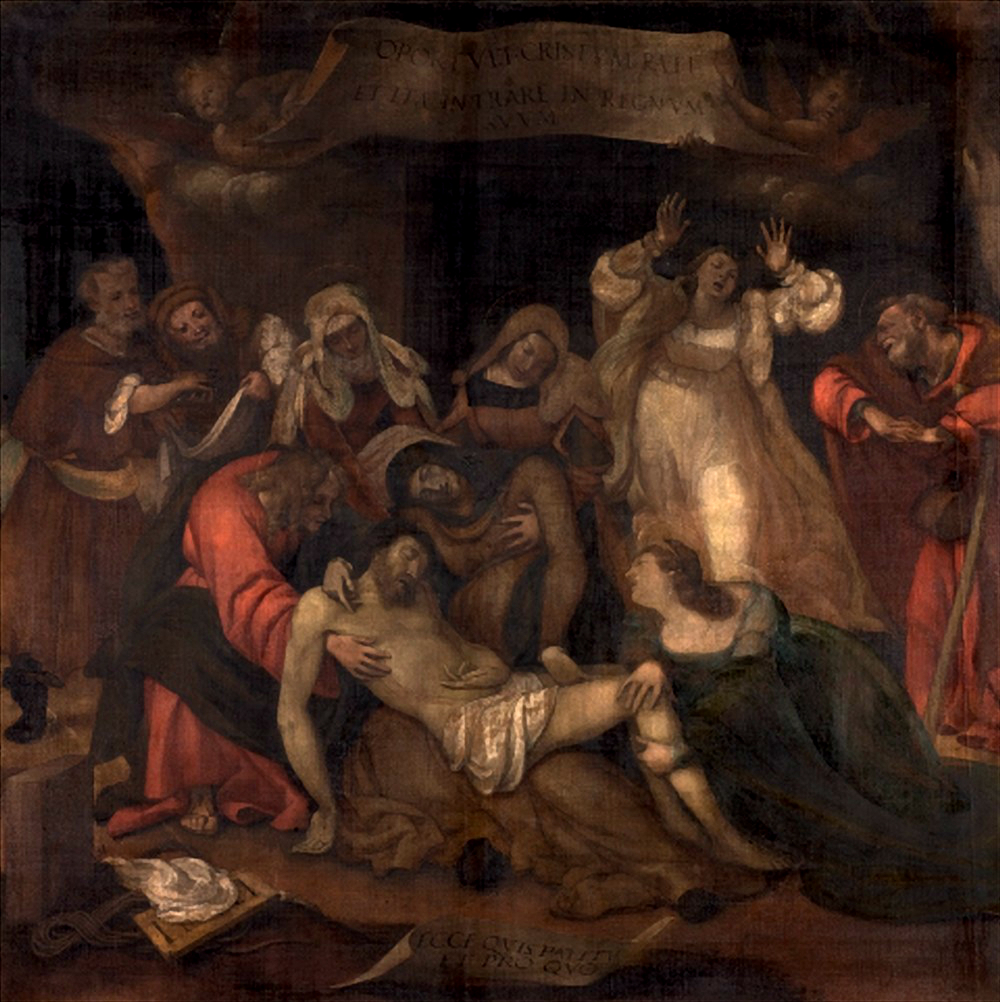
Lament over the Dead Christ (c. 1522) by Lorenzo Lotto

Lament over the Dead Christ is an oil-on-canvas painting by Lorenzo Lotto, created c. 1522, now in the sacristy of Sant'Alessandro in Colonna on via Sant'Alessandro in Bergamo. The work was restored in 1548, 1702, 1880 and 1998, not always respecting the original tones and colours and thus rendering it difficult to recognise Lotto's traditional characteristics.

The work was commissioned for the Corpus Domini chapel by the 'Societas Corporis Domini Nostri Jesu Christi et Sancti Joseph', a confraternity. The commission was probably made between 1521 and 1523. When the church was modified and the altar rededicated, the painting was moved to the sacristy.

== Bibliography ==
- Simone Facchinetti. Lorenzo Lotto: Compianto sul Cristo morto. Studi, indagini, problemi conservativi (in Italian). Silvana.
