= Baglioni Madonna =

Painting by Andrea Previtali

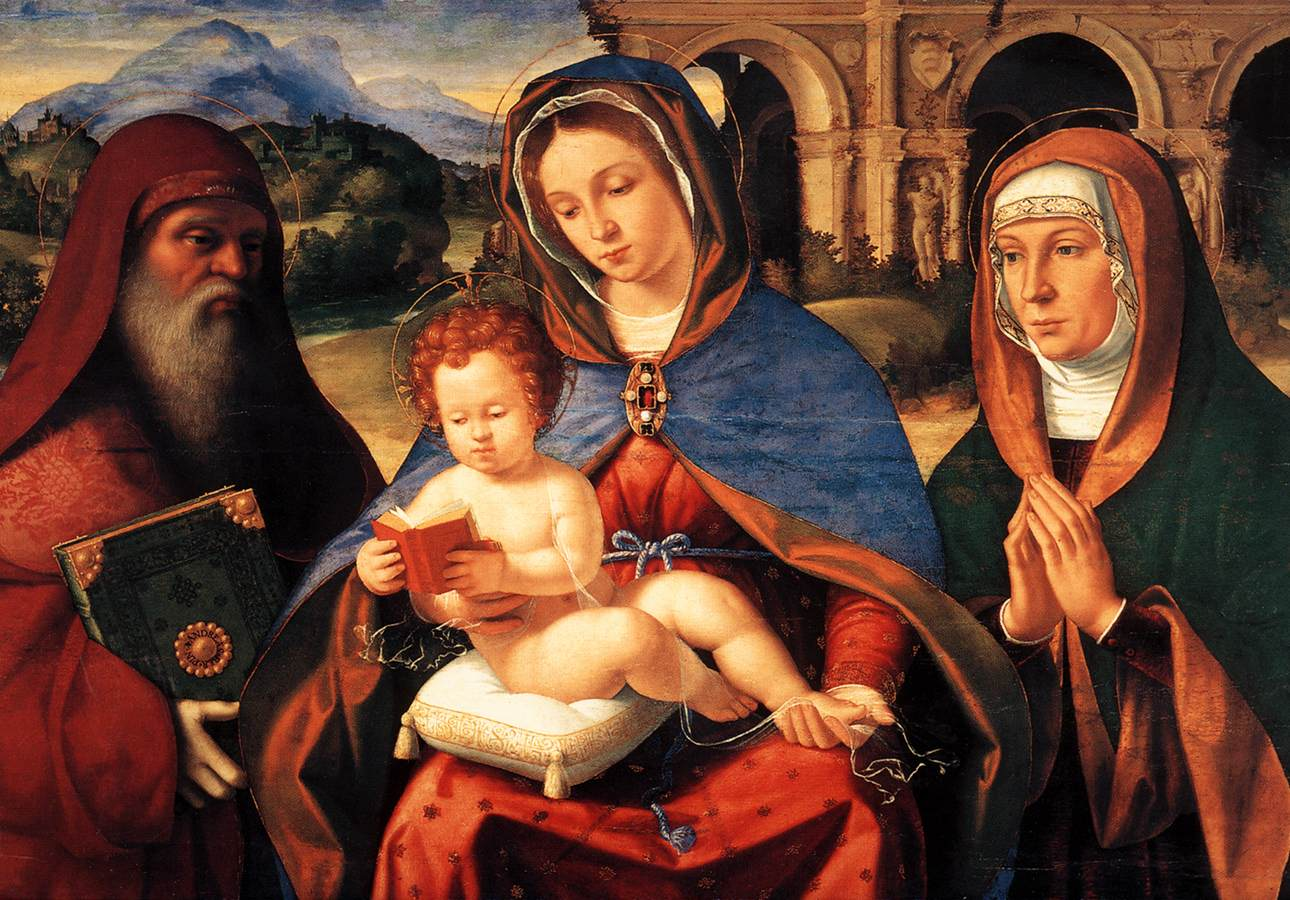
Baglioni Madonna (c. 1512–1513) by Andrea Previtali

The Baglioni Madonna or Madonna and Child with Saint Jerome and Saint Anne is an oil on panel painting by Andrea Previtali, executed c. 1512–1513, now in the art gallery of the Accademia Carrara in Bergamo. His earliest surviving work, it is signed ANDREAS.BER.PIN. Since 1900 it has been named after its last private owner Francesco Baglioni, who gave it to its present home. It belongs to the sacra conversazione genre. It was restored in 2011 by Amalia Pacia of the Sovraintendenza per i Beni Storici Artistici ed Etnoatropologici di Mialno and Maria Cristina Rodeschini from the Accademia Carrara.

== Additional images ==
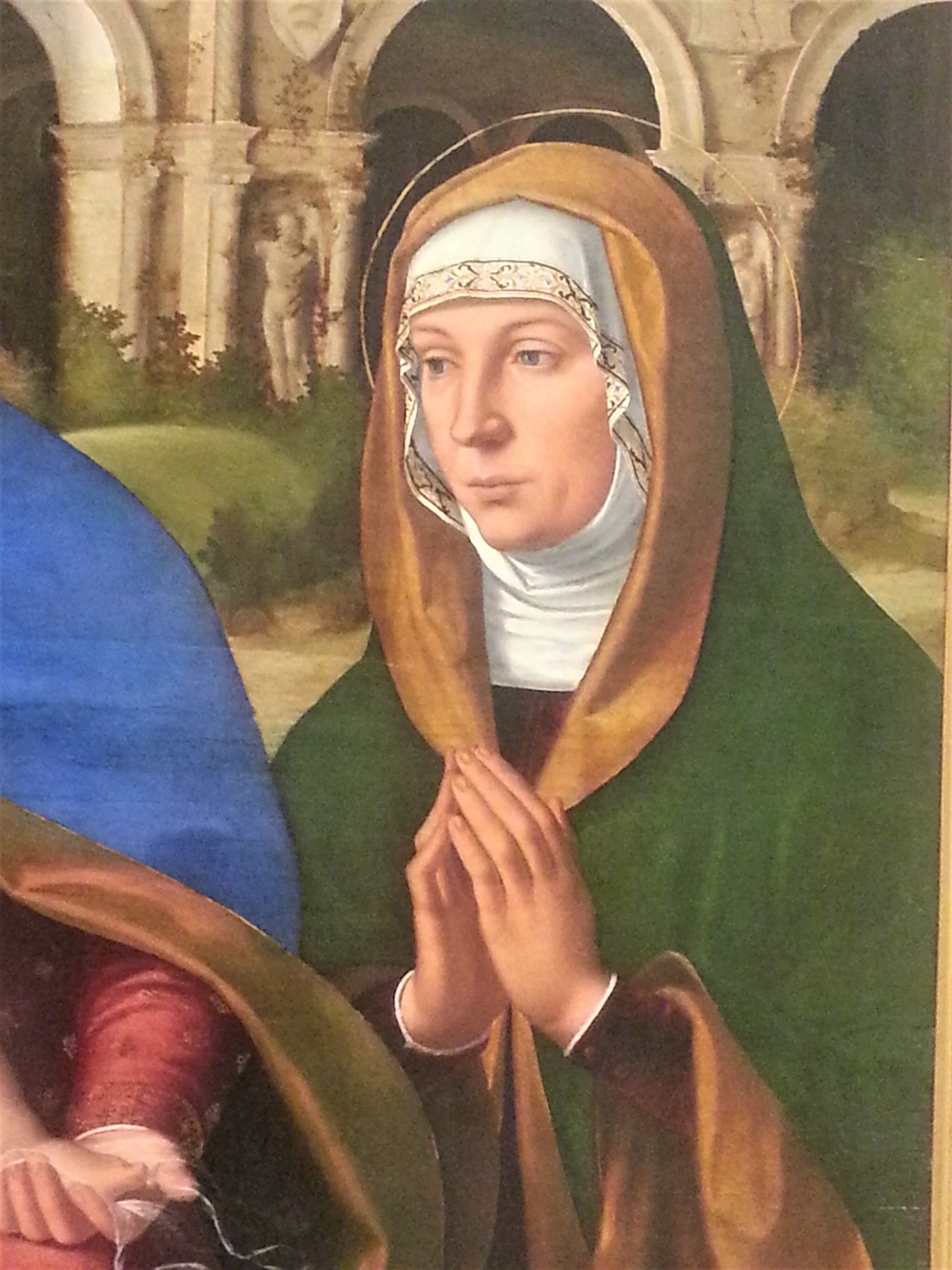
Detail of the work

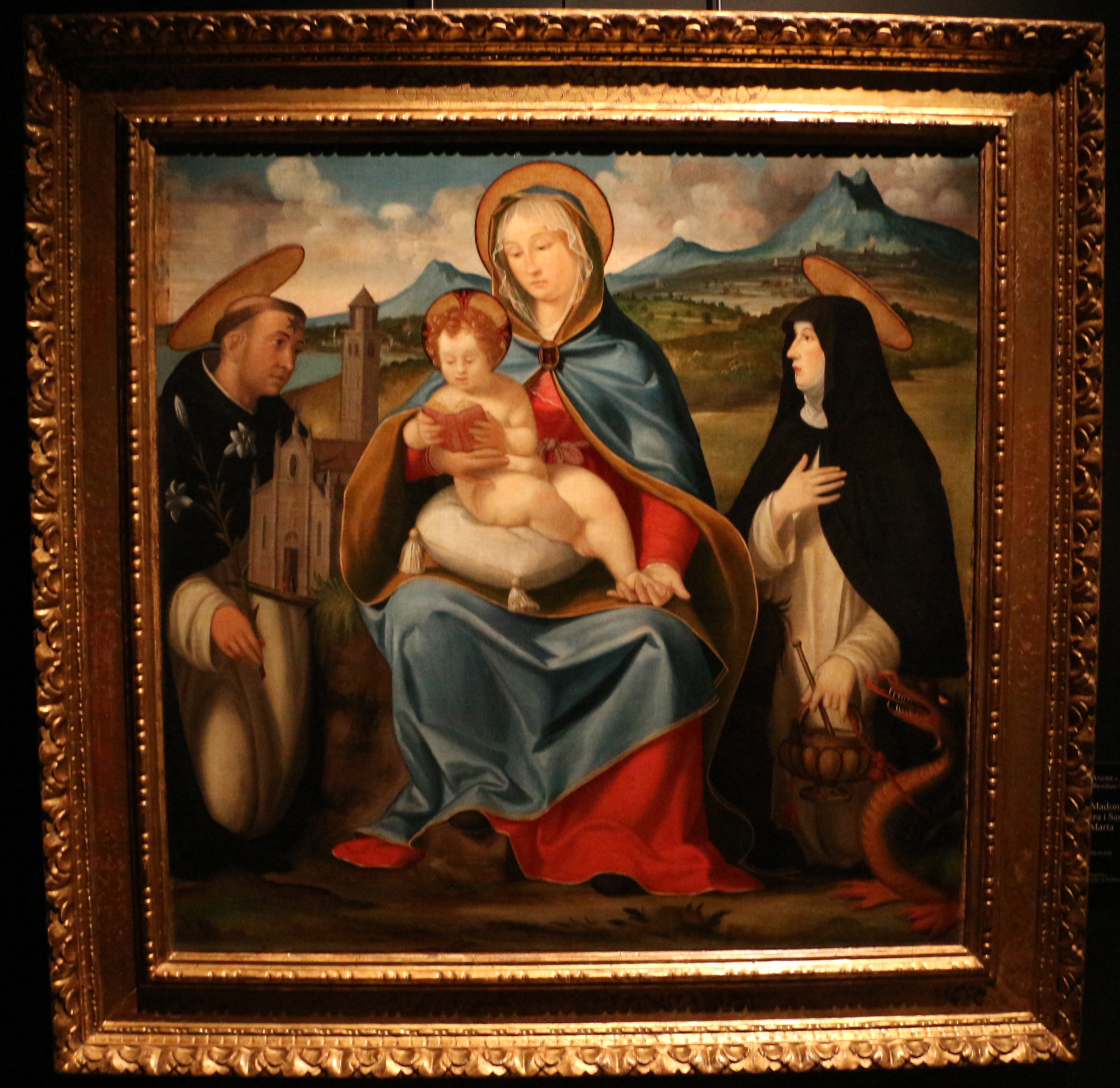
Madonna and Child with Saint Dominic and Saint Martha of Bethany

The title "Madonna Baglioni" was attributed in 1900, when the owner, Francesco Baglioni, donated it to the Accademia Carrara. The exact identification of the depicted saints is much more difficult and not everyone agrees on their identities, as canvases were never titled by the artists, and were not always signed.

The painting, preserved in the Bergamo art gallery, is reportedly dedicated to Saints Zechariah and Anne, but it is not ruled out that the figures could be Saints Augustine, or Anthony the Abbot, or Saint Zechariah, while the female saint is also identified as Saint Elizabeth; there are no attributes that allow for an exact identification.

== Description ==
The painting depicting a Sacred Conversation has the typical composition of the Madonna and Child placed between two saints, in the form created by Giovanni Bellini around 1480; Previtali probably took inspiration from the Madonna and Child with Saint John the Baptist and a Female Saint.

The figures are painted in half-length. The Madonna seems to be following with her gaze the reading of the book that the Child—seated on a cushion on her lap—holds in his hands. Previtali depicts the same situation in his painting Madonna and Child with Saint Dominic and Saint Martha of Bethany. With her left hand the Madonna holds one of the child's feet. The child is depicted in an uncomfortable position, performing an unnatural twist of his torso. The Virgin Mary wears a large jewel that fastens her cloak; on the right stands a saint whose face could be that of the patroness from the Dolfin family, whose coat of arms is present on the building behind the saint. The delicate features and the position of the hands in prayer recall the style of Giovanni Bellini. On the left, a saint holds a gospel in his hands; the scarcity of elements prevents a definitive attribution. The painting is signed "ANDREAS.BER.PIN" on the clasp located in the center of the book cover held by the saint. The signature suggests the work dates back to the time when Previtali was working in Venice, or perhaps it was commissioned by a Venetian patron when the artist was already in Bergamo, Indeed, one can find similarities to the works of Ambrogio Bergognone, particularly in the figure of the saint on the right of the painting, which demonstrates the artist's ability to capture and adapt the works of other artists.

The painting in the upper part is divided into two sections: on the right, a classical building ravaged by the passage of time—Previtali, like other artists, depicted decaying structures to indicate the decadence of that era, both due to the wars that raged and the new religious ideas reaching Italy. The left side depicts a landscape that gently recedes towards the horizon; this part certainly shows aspects that recall works by Giorgione.

The restoration of the work has made it possible to find similarities with another work by the artist, Madonna and Child with Saint Dominic and Saint Martha of Bethany, in particular the Madonna and Child, who are depicted in the same position.

=== Identification of the two saints ===
The painting does not contain any identifying elements for the two saints, who are commonly referred to as Saint Zechariah and Saint Elizabeth, but since there is no Saint John present to confirm their identity, this cannot be definitively confirmed. According to Berenson, the saint could be Saint Augustine, but he is not wearing a bishop's vestments or holding a crozier, nor is the attribution to Saint Anthony Abbot plausible, as he lacks the Tau cross, the fire, and the staff. However, comparing it to other works by the artist, the saint could be identified as Saint Jerome, as in Previtali's painting Madonna Enthroned with the Blessing Child between Four Saints and a Musical Angel, preserved in the Diocesan Museum of Padua. If this figure is identified as Saint Jerome, the female saint could be Saint Anne (mother of Mary), who in many depictions wears a green cloak; furthermore, the same composition is found in Lorenzo Lotto's painting Holy Family with St Jerome and St Anne. Knowledge of the patrons would lead to an easy and certain attribution, but this information is unknown.

== Bibliography ==
- Mauro Zanchi (2009). Andrea Previtali il colore prospettico di maniera belliniana. Ferrari Editrice.
- Rodeschini Galati Maria Cristina (2011). Andrea Previtali. La «Madonna Baglioni» e «Madonna con il bambino leggente tra san Domenico e santa Marta di Betania». Lubrina Editore. ISBN 978-88-7766-425-9.
