= Santi Bartolomeo e Stefano, Bergamo =

Church building in Bergamo, Italy

Coordinates: 45.69583°N 9.67153°E

Santi Bartolomeo e Stefano
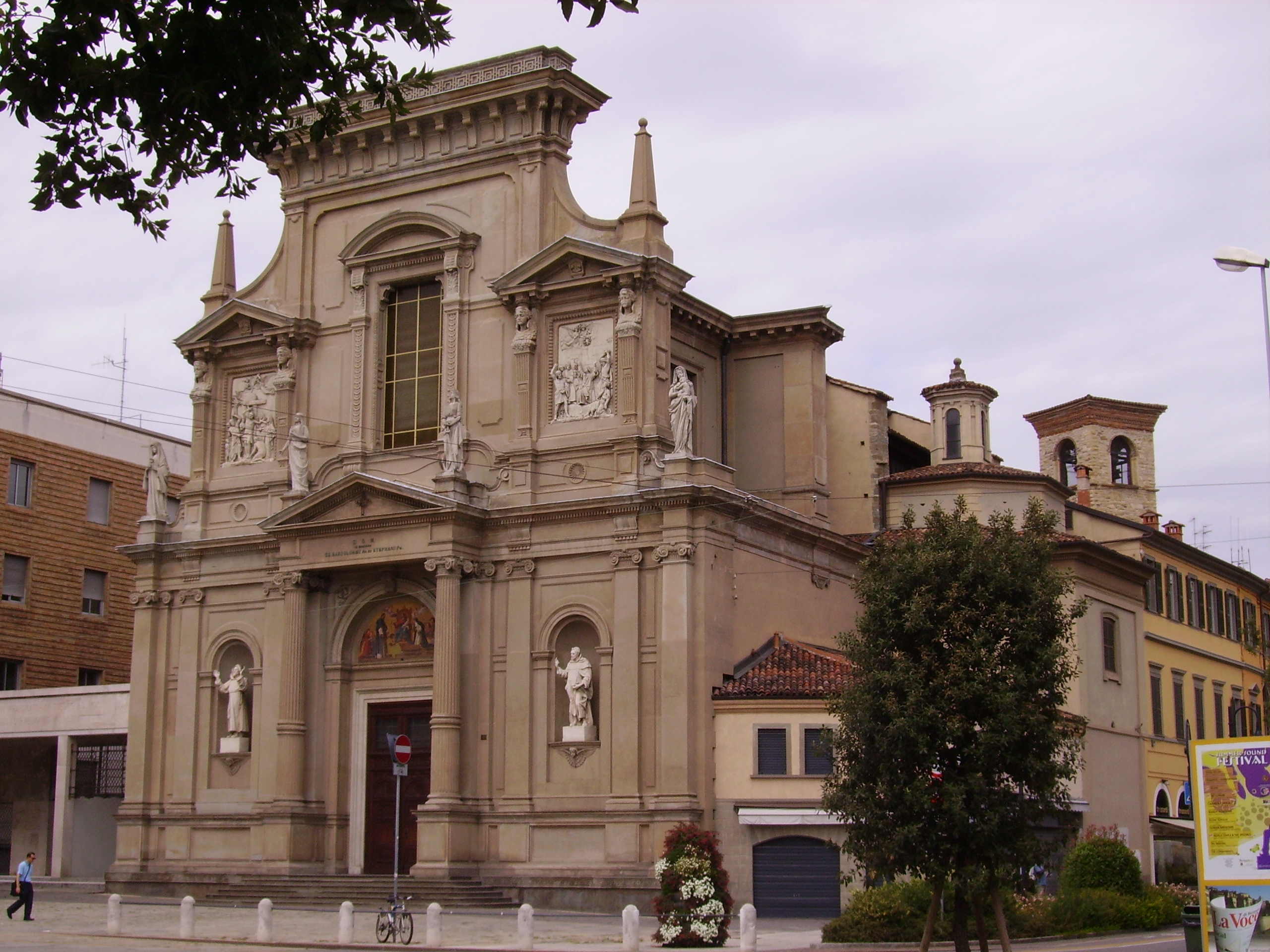

Religion
- Affiliation: Roman Catholic

Location
- Location: Bergamo, Italy
- Interactive map of Santi Bartolomeo e Stefano

Architecture
- Architect: Anton Maria Caneva
- Type: Church
- Style: Renaissance
- Groundbreaking: 1613

Specifications
- Length: 60 m (200 ft)
- Width: 14 m (46 ft)

Santi Bartolomeo e Stefano is a Baroque-style, Roman Catholic church located at number 1 Largo Belotti in Bergamo in the Lombardy region of Italy.

The church is associated with a Dominican convent and stands about a block away from the Teatro Donizetti.

== History ==
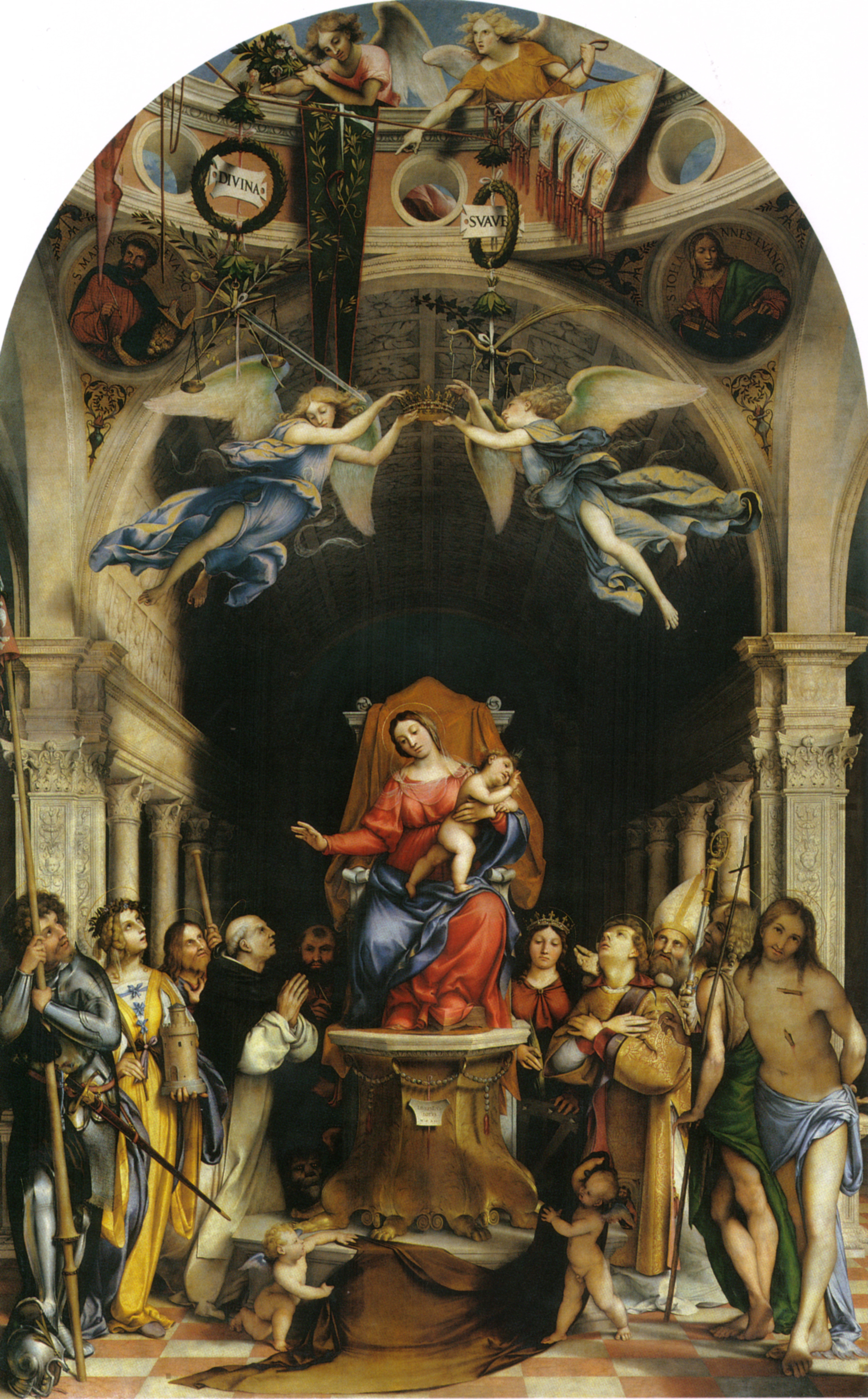
Pala Martinengo by Lorenzo Lotto

The church was built in 1613–1642, adjacent to a monastery of San Bartolomeo, which had belonged to the religious order of the Humiliati. After this order was suppressed, the convent was granted to the Dominicans, with whom it remains associated today. The monastery was destroyed and rebuilt in 1970 by the Dominicans.

The church houses a large canvas, a masterpiece by the well-known painter Lorenzo Lotto called Pala Martinengo, or Martinengo Altarpiece.

The chapel of the Madonna of the Rosary is highly decorated in stucco and painting (1752) by the studio of Antonio and Muzio Camuzio. The Bolognese painter Francesco Monti decorated the area of the cupola with a transfiguration. The cornices are decorated with 15 Holy Mysteries of the Rosary (1757) in monochrome by Giuseppe Antonio Felice Orelli. The choir was carved by Damiano Zambelli (1480–1549) for the church of San Stefano, which was torn down, and thus the choir stalls moved ultimately to end here. The ceiling of the nave was frescoed by Mattia Bortoloni. He also frescoed (1749) in the choir and presbytery, the Sacrifice of Isaac and Glory of Santissimi Sacramento, but died before the completion of all of his designs. Further frescoes in the ceilings, including a Glory of the Dominican Order (1751), were completed by Gaspare Diziani.

Other altarpieces include paintings by Mauro Picenardi, Giuseppe Brena, Enea Salmeggia also called il Talpino, Francesco Coppella, Pietro Ricchi also called il Lucchese, Carlo Salis, Giovanni Battista Discepoli also called lo Zoppo, Agostino Facheris also called il Caversegno, Pietro Damiani da Castelfranco and Giorgio Anselmi
