= The Martyrdom of Saint Peter Martyr (Palma Vecchio) =

Painting by Palma Vecchio

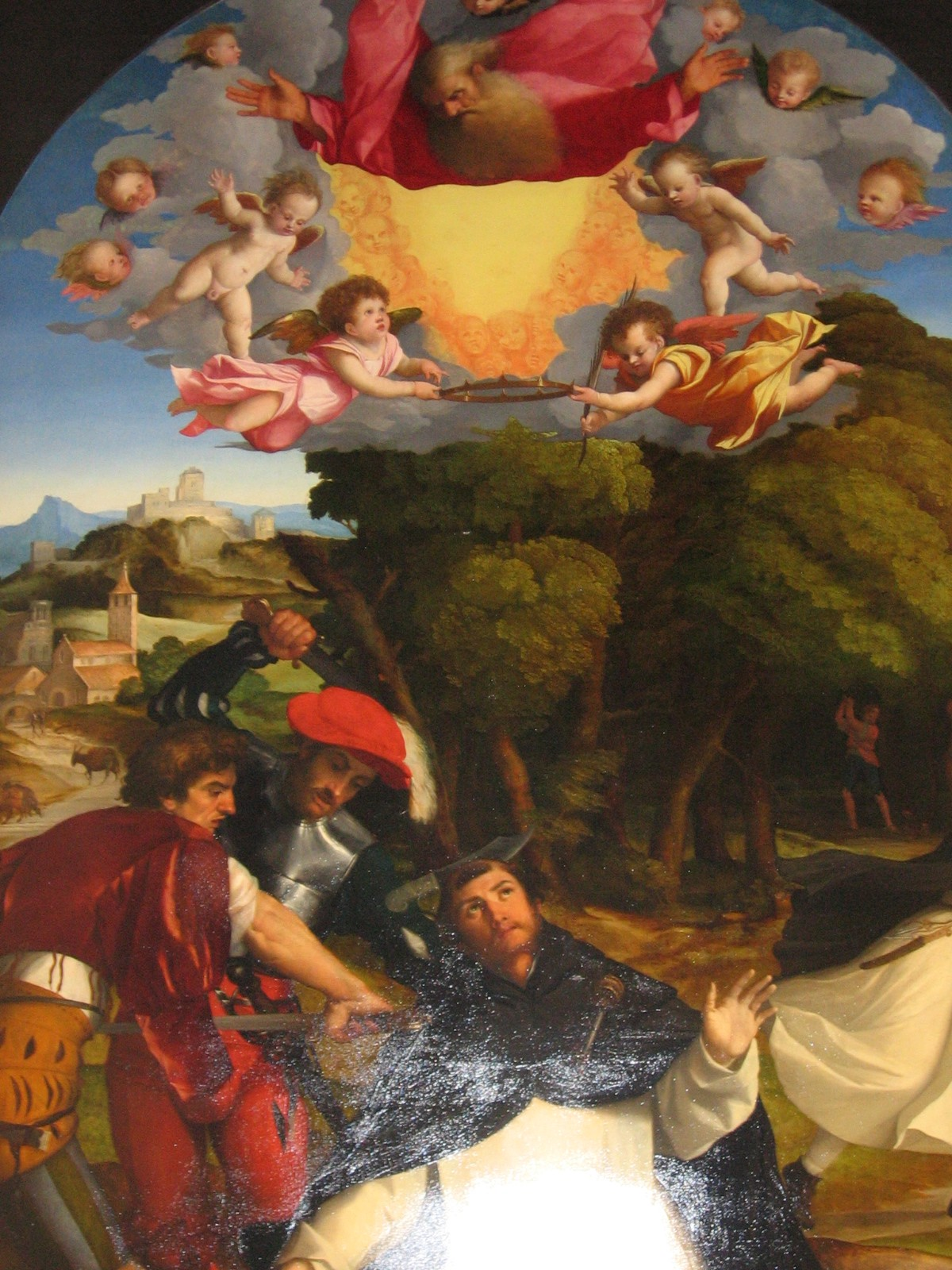
The Martyrdom of Saint Peter Martyr (1526–1528) by Palma Vecchio

The Martyrdom of Saint Peter Martyr is an oil-on-panel painting created c. 1526–1528 by the Italian Renaissance painter Palma Vecchio, now in the Museo d'arte sacra San Martino in Alzano Lombardo.

== History ==
For a long time it was not attributed to Palma Vecchio. It was his entry for the 1528 competition held by the confraternity of San Pietro to produce an altarpiece at Santi Giovanni e Paolo, Venice, as did Titian (whose entry was destroyed by fire in 1867, though a print of it survives) and Pordenone (whose entry survives in the Uffizi) and also shows the assassination).

Titian won the competition but the congregation of flagellants ("disciplini") in Alzano was looking for a work to be their high altarpiece for their new church dedicated to Saint Peter Martyr and showed interest in Palma Vecchio's work. That church was rebuilt in 1510–1529 and the work may have been acquired during those years. The altarpiece in which the work was placed to complete the apse was probably designed by Pietro Isabello, Palma's friend and contemporary, who had also designed the church.

Bernard Berenson identified the work as a Lorenzo Lotto from 1514–1515. Lotto knew Palma well and may have acted as a link between the artist and the flagellants. Roberto Longhi restored the current attribution in 1926.
