= Santo Spirito, Bergamo =

Church in Bergamo, Lombardy, Italy

Coordinates: 45.6985°N 9.6759°E

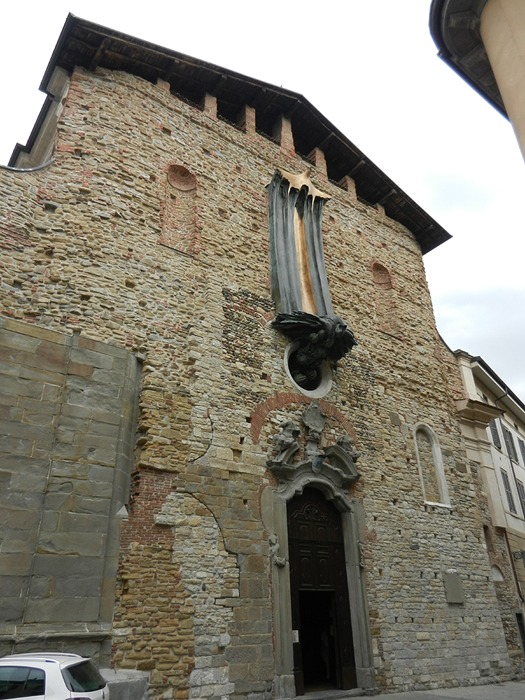
Santo Spirito, Bergamo

Santo Spirito is a Roman Catholic church located on Piazzetta Santo Spirito in Bergamo, in the region of Lombardy, Italy.

== History ==
The church was founded in the 1300s by Cardinal Guglielmo Longo, along with an adjacent hospital and a convent of the Celestine order of Benedictines. In 1475, it was allocated to the Canons Regular of the Lateran.

In the early 1500s it was refurbished; in the 1530 to 1535, the nave was rebuilt with five chapels on each side. Pietro Isabello participated in the 16th-century reconstruction; in 1720, the next refurbishment was led by Giovanni Battista Caniana.

== Interior decoration ==
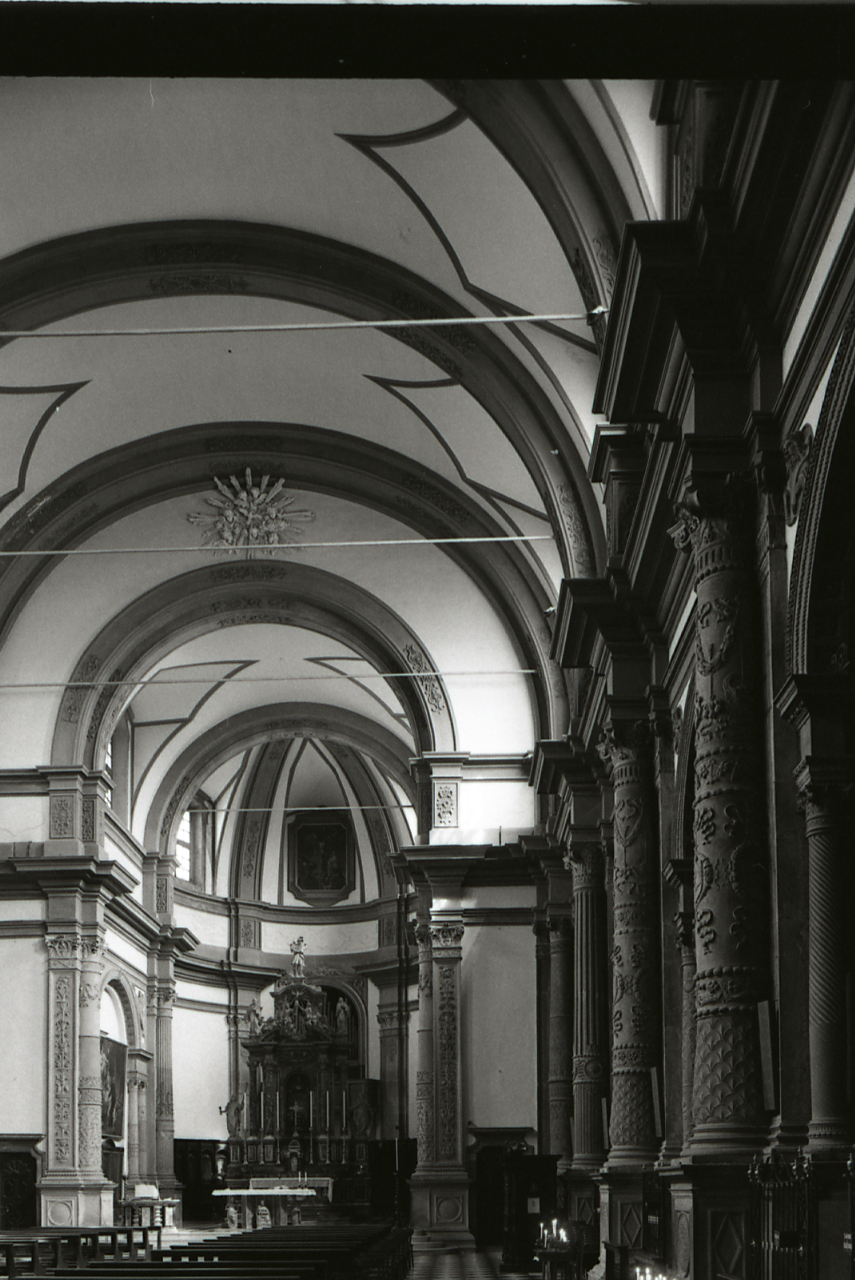
Interior: the nave and apse. Photograph by Paolo Monti.

In the first chapel on the right are two canvases: the Deposition by Giulio Carpioni and a Miracle of Saint Antony of Padua by Domenico Viani. In the second chapel on the right was built in 1512 using designs by Pietro Isabello, and originally had the altarpiece of Andrea Previtali, now found in the first chapel on the left.

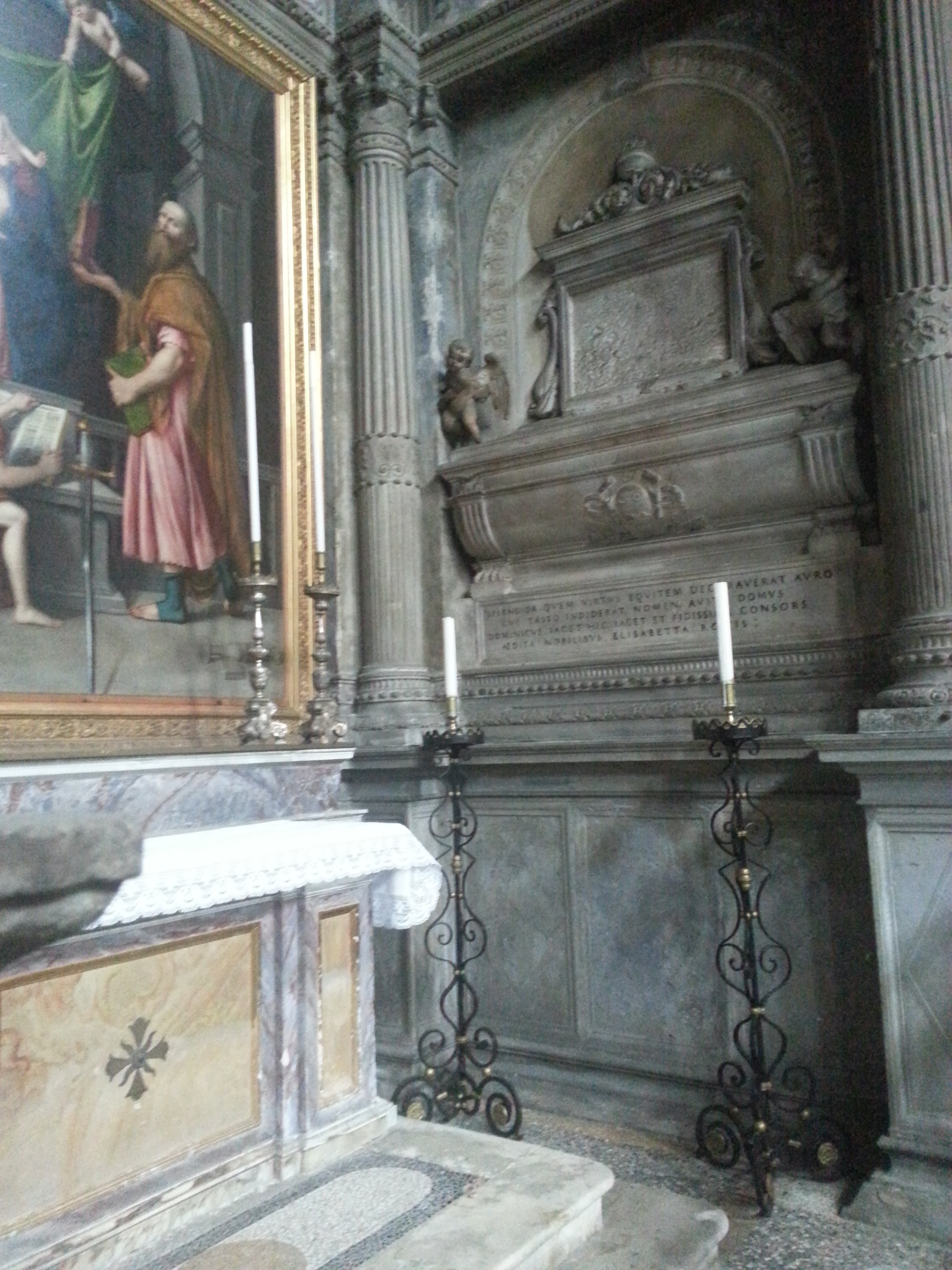
Tomb of Agostino and Caterina Tasso and Scipione Piazza's Madonna and Child with Saints Peter and Paul and an Angel

In the fourth chapel is a prominent painting by Lorenzo Lotto of the Madonna and Child with Saints Catherine of Alexandria, Augustine, Sebastian, and Antony Abbot (1521). It is flanked by two canvases: Daniel in the Lions' Den and Saint Francis Receiving the Stigma by Gian Paolo Cavagna. On the main altar of the presbytery are sculptures that once formed part of the funeral monument of Agostino and Caterina Tasso. The wooden choir, only 17 of the original 50 stalls, was carved in the 16th century.

In the first chapel on the left is the funeral monument of Agostino and Caterina Tasso and a painting of the Madonna and Child with Saints Peter and Paul and an Angel by Scipione Piazza. There is also a canvas depicting Saint John the Baptist and other Saints by Andrea Previtali. In the second chapel on the left is a polyptych depicting the Descent of the Holy Spirit upon the Madonna and Apostles (1507) by Ambrogio Bergognone. In the third chapel on the left is a 14th-century altarpiece depicting the Madonna del Buon Consiglio and Child. In the fourth chapel on the left are paintings depicting the Passion of Christ attributed to Pietro Rotari.
