= Madonna and Child Enthroned with Saints (Moretto) =

Painting by Moretto da Brescia

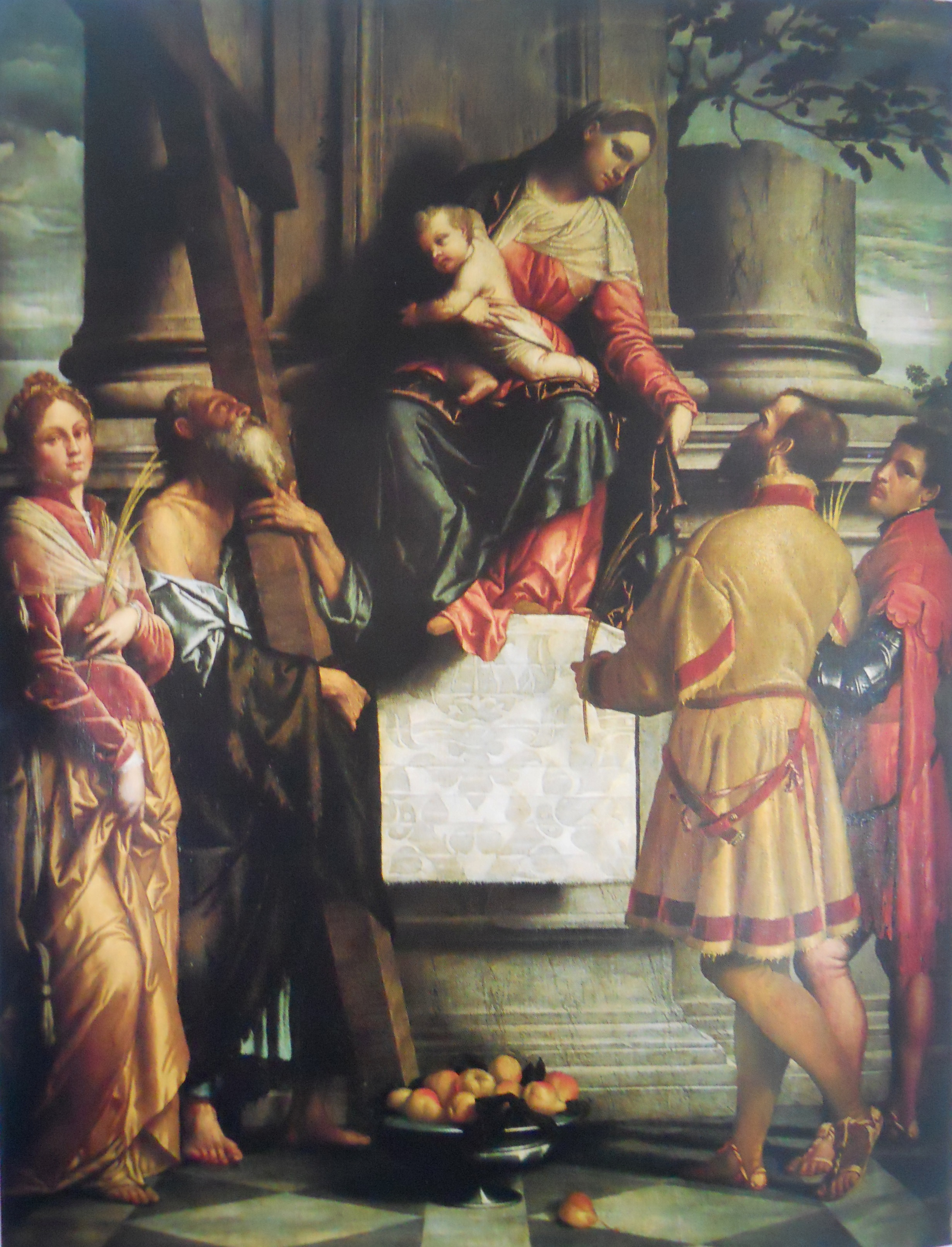
Madonna and Child Enthroned with Saints (1536-1537) by Moretto da Brescia

Madonna and Child Enthroned with Saints is a 1536-1537 oil on canvas painting by Moretto da Brescia, now on one of the side altars in the church of Sant'Andrea in Bergamo.

It shows Saints Eusebia, Andrew, Domno and Domneone.
