= Sant'Alessandro in Colonna =

Church in Bergamo, Lombardy, Italy

Coordinates: 45°41′41.68″N 9°39′52.64″E

Sant'Alessandro in Colonna is a Baroque style, Roman Catholic church located on Via Sant'Alessandro in Bergamo, region of Lombardy, Italy.

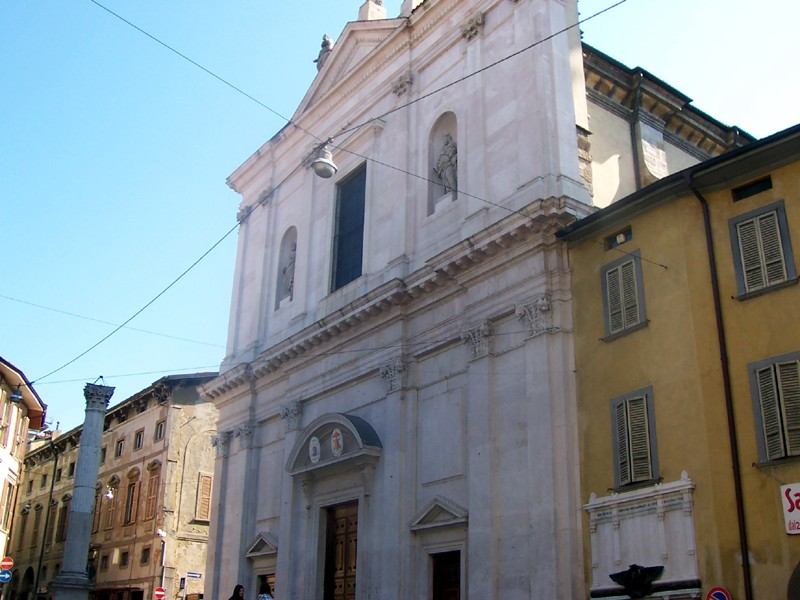
The facade of the church

== History and description ==
A church at the site dates to paleo-Christian times, however after a collapse of the structure in 1447, the church was rebuilt followed by restorations between the late 17th and 18th centuries. Outside stands an ancient Roman Column, recomposed in 1618, where traditionally St Alexander was martyred.

The nave has four chapels on each side. In the sacristy is a Grief over a dead Christ by the school of Lorenzo Lotto, a Virgin in adoration of the Christ Child (1512) by Alessandro Bonvicino called il Moretto, and a "Madonna dello scoiattolo" by Giacomo Gavazzi. The sacristy also houses a Trinity by Enea Salmeggia, copied from a work by Lotto.

In the altar in the left transept is an Annunciation by Gerolamo Romanino; in the right transept, near the Chapel of the Corpus Christi is a Saints Peter, Paul, and Cristopher in Glory by Giovan Paolo Cavagna.
