= Sant'Andrea, Bergamo =

Church building in Bergamo, Italy

Coordinates: 45°42′11″N 9°40′06″E

Church of Sant’Andrea
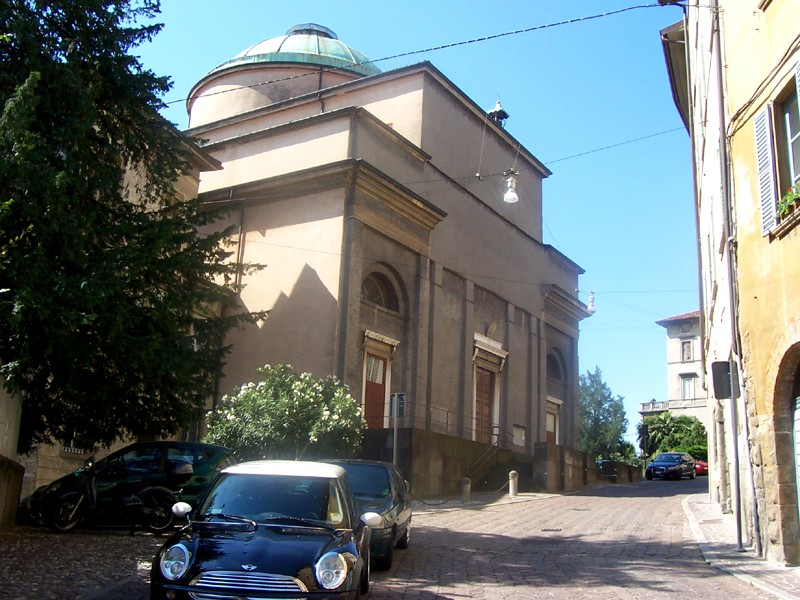

Religion
- Affiliation: Roman Catholic

Location
- Location: Bergamo, Italy
- Interactive map of Church of Sant’Andrea

Architecture
- Architect: Ferdinando Crivelli
- Type: Church
- Style: Neoclassic
- Completed: 1847

Sant'Andrea is a Neoclassic church in Bergamo, rebuilt by Ferdinando Crivelli in 1837. On the main altar, is Enthroned Madonna with child and Saints Eusebius, Andrew, Domno, and Domneone, painted in 1536-7 by Il Moretto and a Nativity by Giovanni Paolo Cavagna. Other paintings here are by Palma il Giovane, Enea Salmeggia, Giovanni Giacomo Barbelli, Padovanino, a ‘’Deposition’’ by Andrea Previtali, and others.

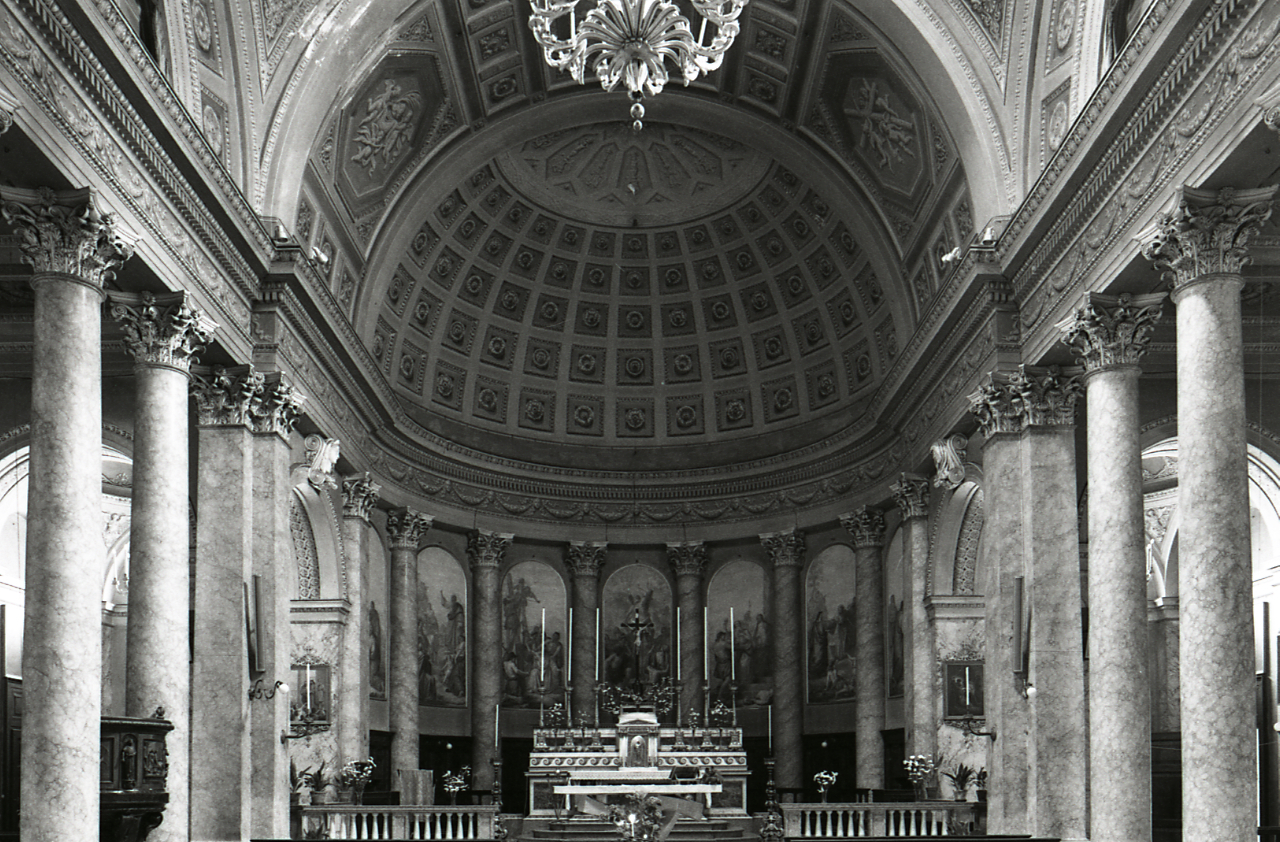
Interior: the nave. Photo by Paolo Monti.

== Bibliography ==
- Pier Virgilio Begni Redona, Alessandro Bonvicino - Il Moretto da Brescia, Editrice La Scuola, Brescia 1988
