= Martinengo Altarpiece =

Painting by Lorenzo Lotto

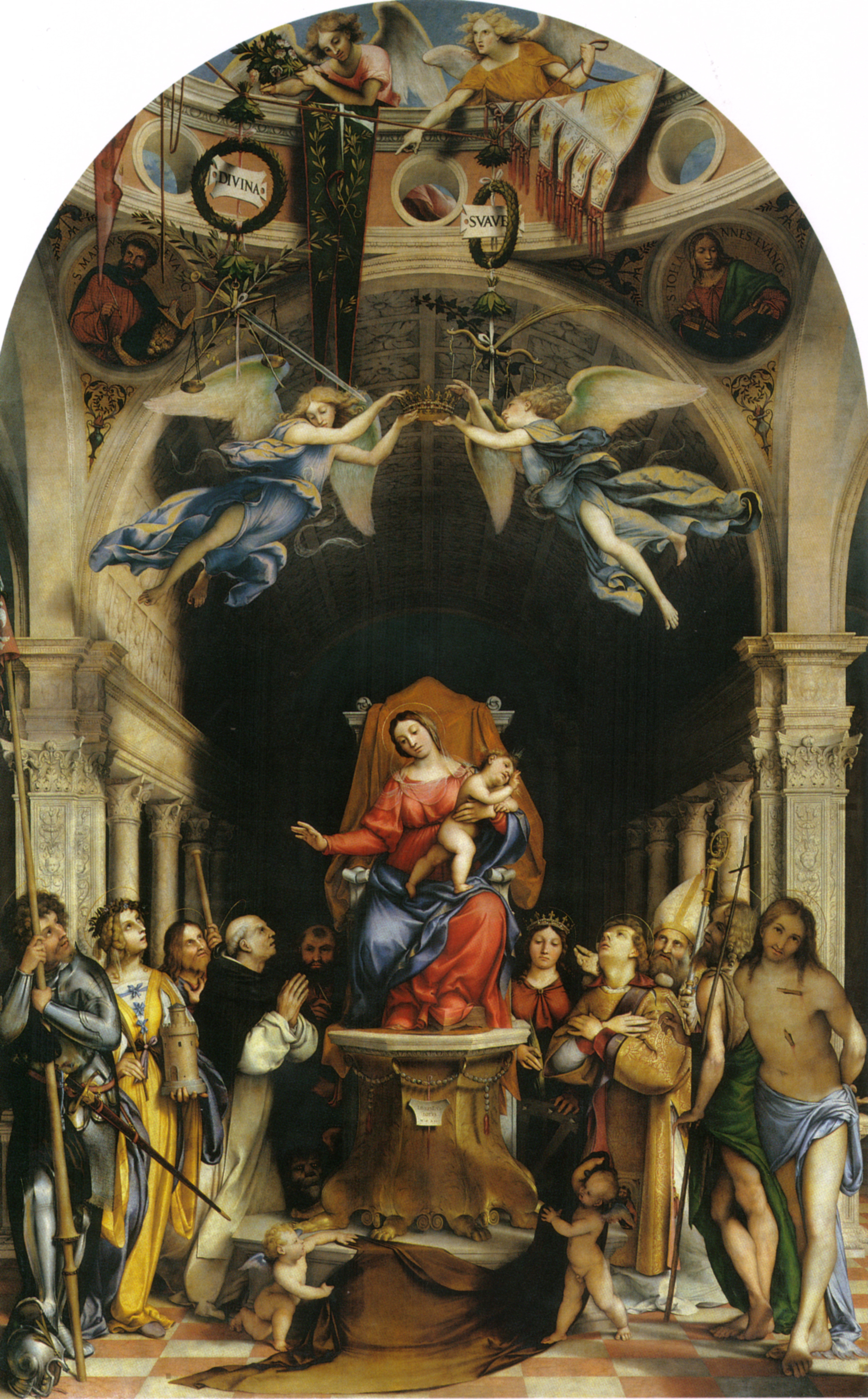
- Artist: Lorenzo Lotto
- Year: 1513–1516
- Medium: Oil on panel
- Dimensions: 520 cm × 250 cm (200 in × 98 in)
- Location: Santi Bartolomeo e Stefano, Bergamo

The Martinengo Altarpiece is a painting by the Italian High Renaissance painter Lorenzo Lotto, finished in 1516. It is housed in the church of Santi Bartolomeo e Stefano in Bergamo in northern Italy.

== History ==
On 15 May 1516, Lotto was in Bergamo to sign a contract for a large altarpiece for the high altar of the church of San Bartolomeo, funded by Alessandro Martinengo Colleoni, who had chosen the church as the family's new burial place (the outstanding Colleoni Chapel is located nearby). It was finished three years later, as testified by the signature, and was paid 500 ducats.

The painting, the largest ever painted by Lotto, was once accompanied by a series of minor panels, which were dispersed in the following centuries and have been only partially identified - one is The Entombment of Christ (now in Bergamo).

== Description ==
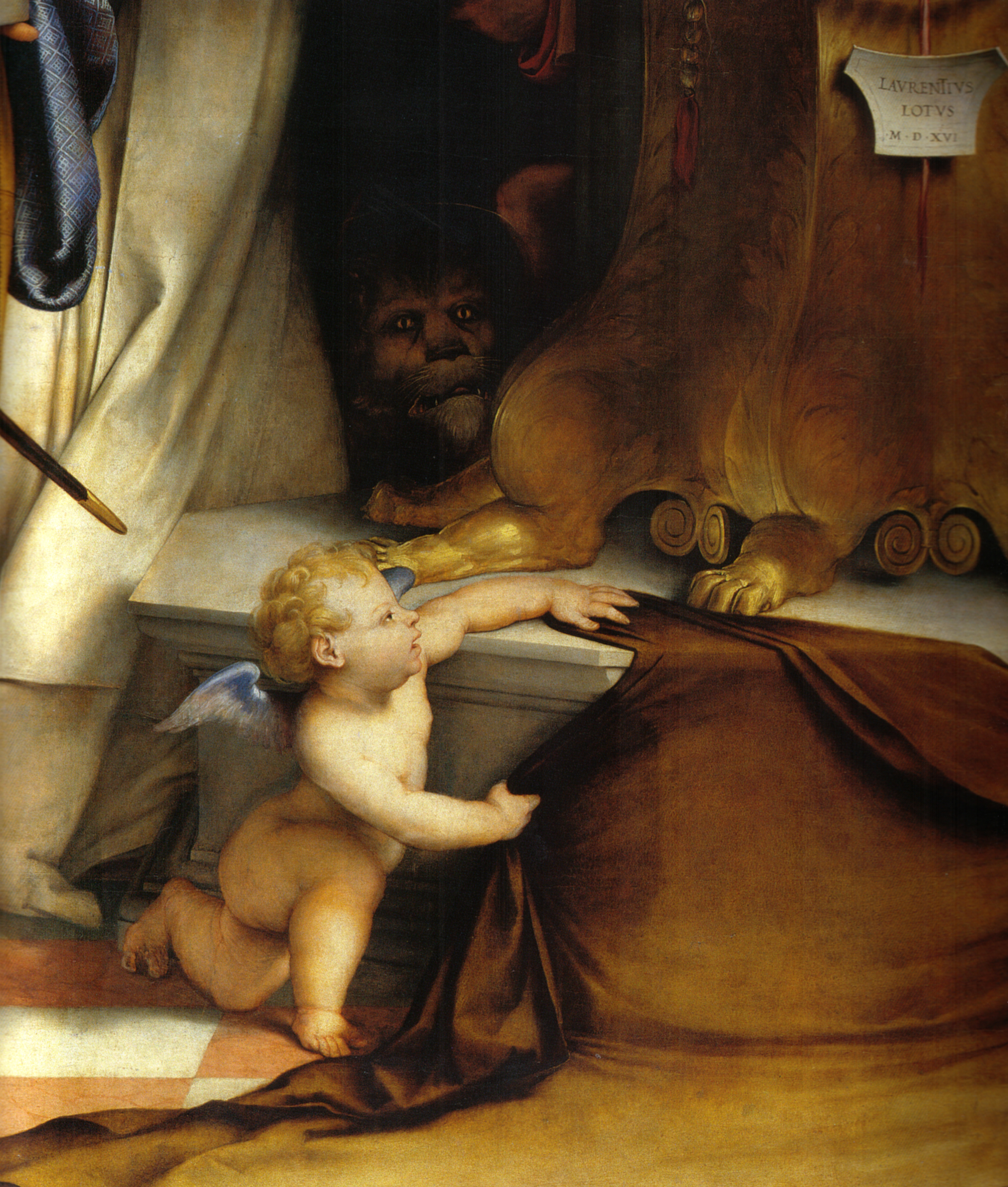
Detail with an angel and the lion.

The subject of the painting is a Holy Conversation, with the Virgin and the Child sitting on a throne surrounded by saints. The scene is set in a majestic architecture perhaps inspired by Bramante style. In the center, where the dome should be, is the tholobate, whose pendentives decorated with Mark and John the Evangelists. Two angels are watching from a balustrade, perhaps inspired by Mantegna's Camera degli Sposi. Two other angels fly over Mary holding her crown.

The interpretation of the numerous symbols of the picture is disputed. Some of the objects could be taken from Francesco Colonna's Hypnerotomachia Poliphili, alluding to the rule of Venice in Bergamo, of which Martinengo was a supporter. The inscription in the upper part, saying Divina Suave, would be a reference to Venice.

In the lower part, the Virgin sits on a throne having a zoomorphic base, whose lion paws are a reference to St. Mark's Lion, symbol of Venice. The lion is also peeping from behind the throne, on the left. There is a total of ten saints, including St. Alexander, eponymous of the donor, portrayed with a scintillating armor and, perhaps, with the face of Martinengo himself. His wife Barbara is also portrayed next to him, as the saint with the same name.

The two child angels in the low foreground are a typical element in Lotto's works.

The work is signed and dated "Laurentius / Lotus / M.D.XVI".

== Secondary panels ==
The following panels, located in other places, are usually associated with the work:

- Angel with Sceptre and a Globe (cymatium), 46x155 cm, Museum of Fine Arts, Budapest
- Martyrdom of St. Stephen (predella), 51x97 cm, Accademia Carrara, Bergamo
- Deposition of Christ (predella), 51x97 cm, Accademia Carrara, Bergamo
- Miracle of St. Dominic (predella), 51x97 cm, Accademia Carrara, Bergamo
- Martyrdom of St. Alexander (tondo, canvas), 16.8 cm diameter, North Carolina Museum of Art, Raleigh
- Pietà (tondo, tela), 16.8 cm diameter, North Carolina Museum of Art, Raleigh
- St. Peter Martyr (from the pillars, canvas), 24x53 cm, Fondazione Longhi, Florence
- Dominican Saint (from the pillars, tela), 24x53 cm, Fondazione Longhi, Florence

== Sources ==
- Pirovano, Carlo (2002). Lotto. Milan: Electa.
