= Andrea Previtali =

Italian Renaissance painter

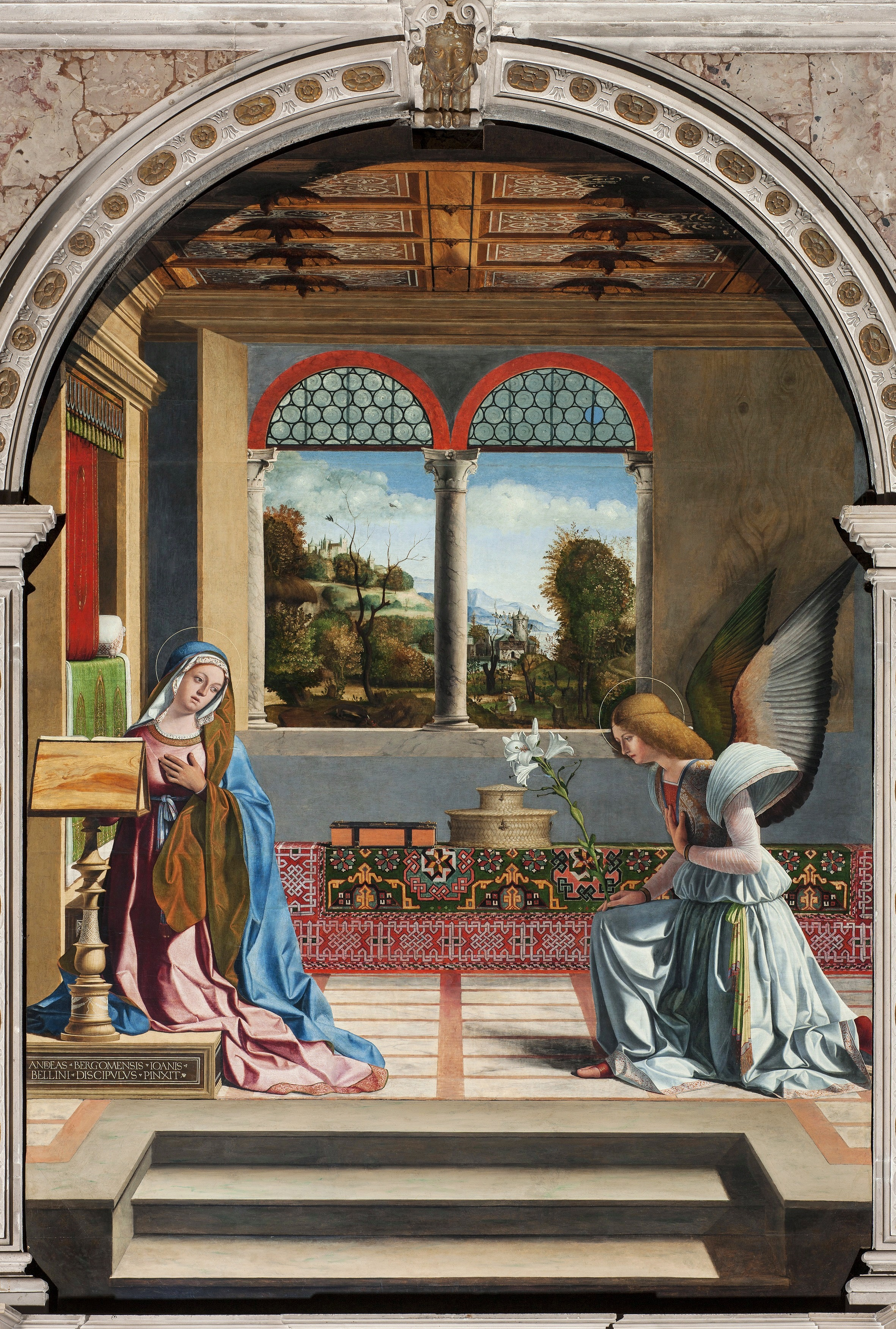
Andrea Previtali's The Annunciation, c. 1508. Note the display of an Oriental carpet.

Andrea Previtali (c. 1480–1528) was an Italian painter of the Renaissance period, active mainly in Bergamo. He was also called Andrea Cordelliaghi.

== Biography ==
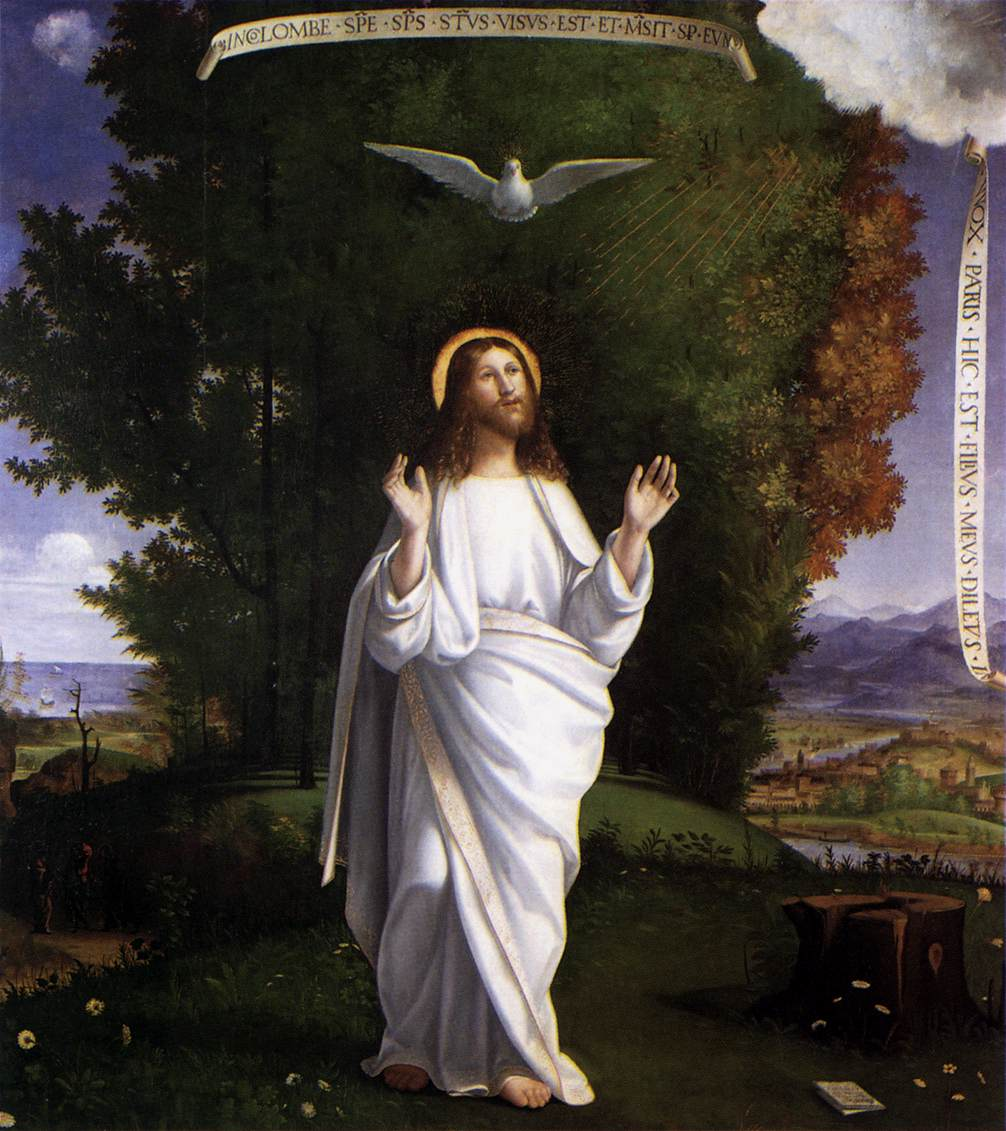
The Transfigured Christ (1513)

Previtali was a pupil of the painter Giovanni Bellini. In Bergamo, he painted a John the Baptist preaching with other saints (1515) for the church of Santo Spirito, a San Benedetto and other saints for Bergamo Cathedral, and a Deposition from the Cross for Sant'Andrea. Other works of his are in the Accademia Carrara. and the National Gallery, London (Salvator Mundi and The Virgin and Child with a Shoot of Olive, both left to the gallery in 1910).

Previtali gained notice in 1937 in the United Kingdom for "not being Giorgione". Kenneth Clark, then Director of the National Gallery, bought two small panels of his from a dealer in Vienna, each with two rustic scenes. He paid £14,000 for them, a high price at the time, despite opposition from his curators. The authoritative ascription of them to Previtali was published in 1938 in The Burlington Magazine by G. M. Richter, based on research by Philip Pouncey, a curator.

Previtali's masterpiece is an Annunciation (illustrated here), which stands over the high altar of the little-known church of Santa Maria del Meschio in Vittorio Veneto.

== Works ==
- Baglioni Madonna
- The Virgin and Child with a Shoot of Olive
- Madonna and Child with Saint Dominic and Saint Martha of Bethany
- Madonna and Child with Saint Sebastian and Saint Vincent Ferrer
- Lament over the Dead Christ

== Other sources ==
- Farquhar, Maria (1855). Ralph Nicholson Wornum (ed.). Biographical catalogue of the principal Italian painters. London: Woodfall & Kinder. p. 134.
- The Giorgione controversy. https://www.nationalgallery.org.uk/paintings/research/scenes-from-tebaldeos-eclogues
- James Stourton: Kenneth Clark: Life, Art and 'Civilization' (London: William Collins, 2016).
