= Wooden inlays of Santa Maria Maggiore (Bergamo) =

Wooden inlays in a church in Lombardy, Italy

Tarsie del coro di Santa Maria Maggiore
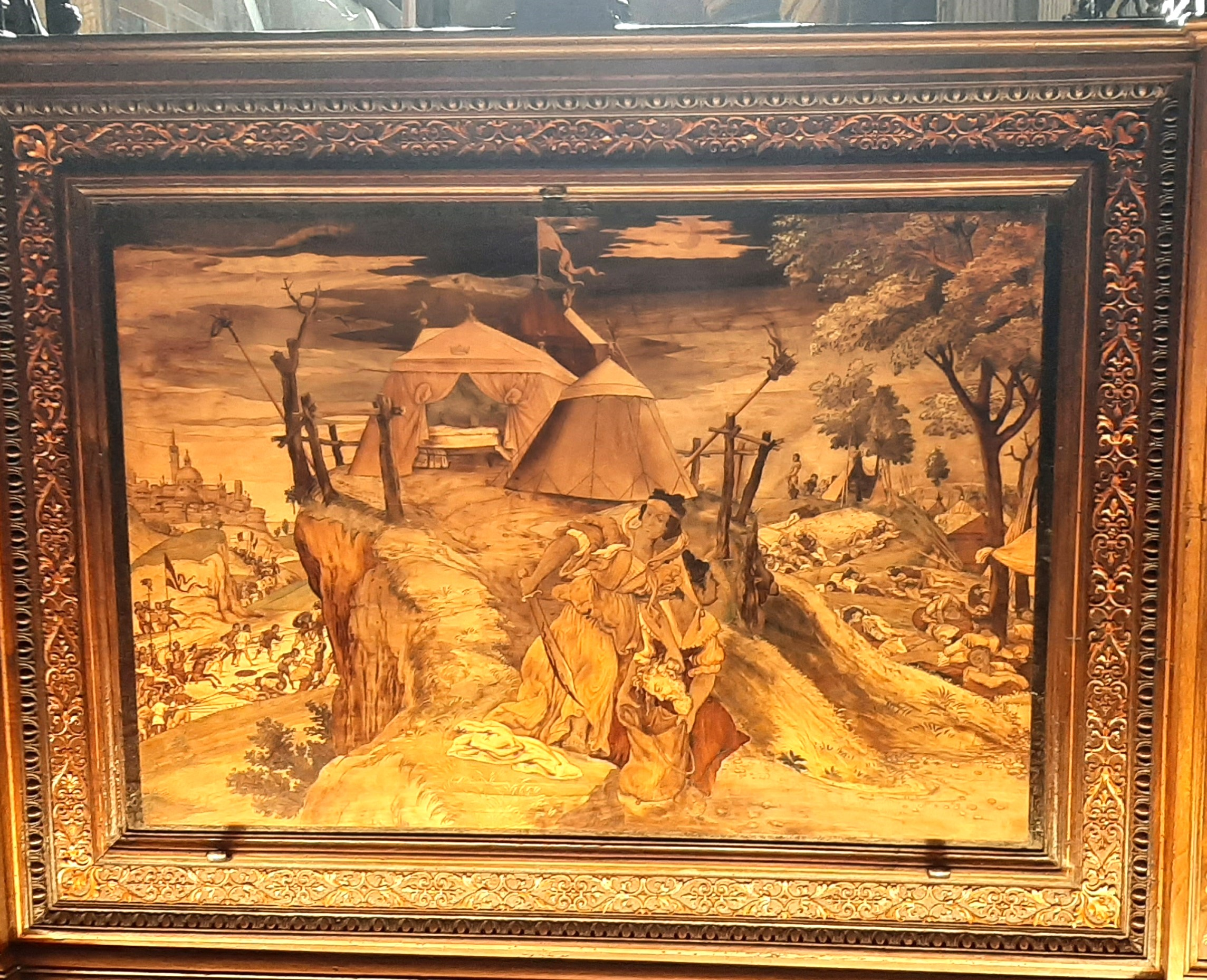
- Artist: Giovan Francesco Capoferri based on designs by Lorenzo Lotto
- Year: 1522–1533
- Type: painting
- Medium: wooden inlay
- Location: Basilica of Santa Maria Maggiore, Bergamo

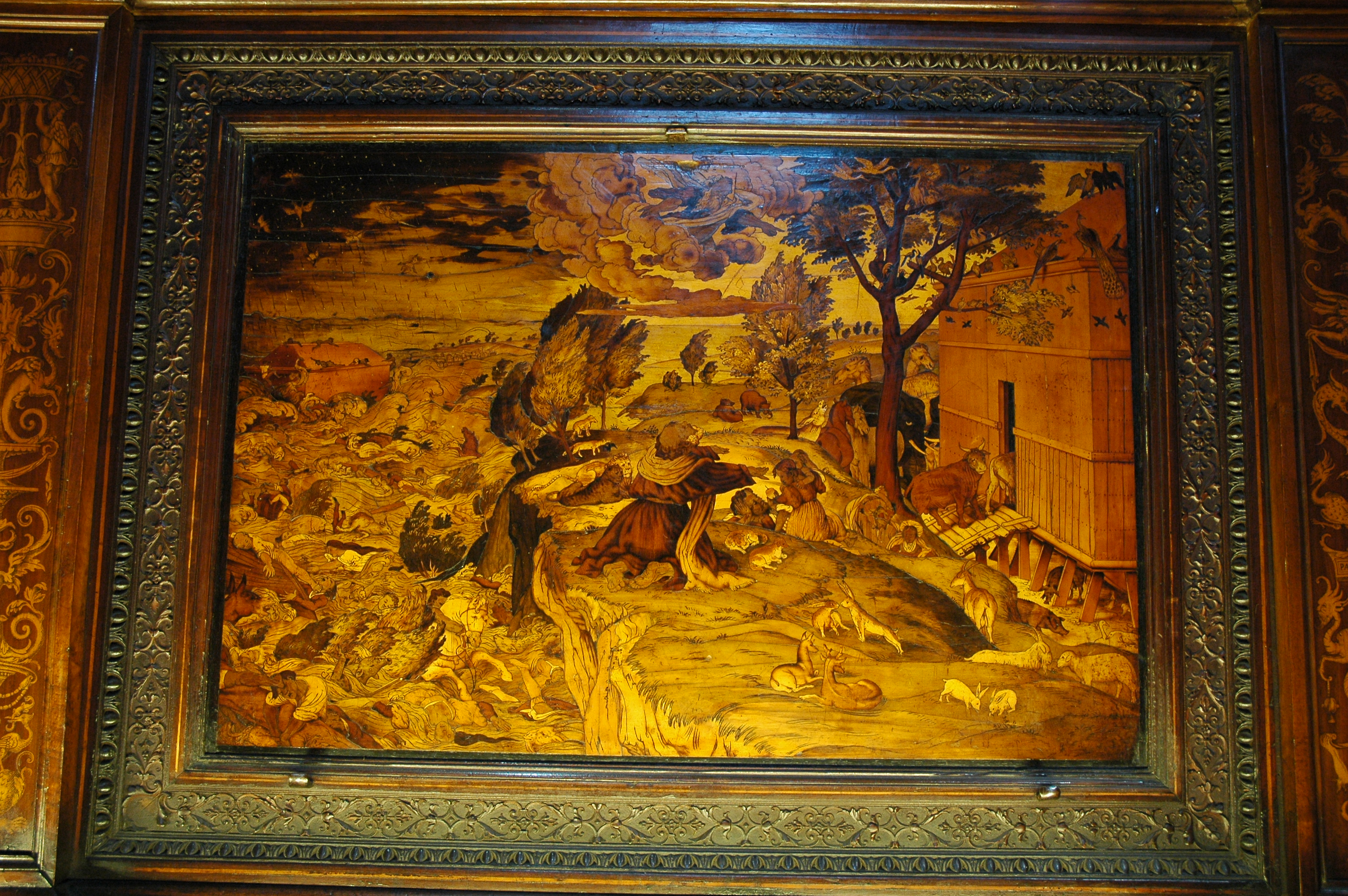
L'arca di Noè

The Tarsie del coro di Santa Maria Maggiore are a significant collection of wooden inlays, crafted between 1524 and 1532 primarily by Giovan Francesco Capoferri, with designs predominantly by Lorenzo Lotto, alongside contributions from other artists. They are in the Basilica of Santa Maria Maggiore in Bergamo.

== History ==
At the beginning of the 16th century, the Chiesa di Santa Maria Maggiore retained its Gothic style, devoid of the stucco work and marble columns that would embellish it in the 17th century. The vast nave was lit solely by biforate and triforate windows opening from the upper matroneum of the Treasury Museum of Santa Maria Maggiore. The apse, illuminated by three windows smaller than the five added in later centuries, had frescoes by Pecino da Nova depicting scenes from the "Life of Mary", as well as works by Michele da Ronco, with a large depiction of the Great Flood adorning the upper band.

The main altar housed a statue of the Madonna deemed inadequate for the grandeur of the new basilica. Consequently, a silver statue was commissioned, though never completed; and in the interim, a choir befitting the anticipated statue was ordered, as the existing choir was considered modest:

Item quia maxima fit impesa et honorifica i fabricatione unius icone ad altare maius ecclesie d. S. Marie Maioris Bergomi ad maximu dei cultuam et civitatis nosrte ornamentus existatque corus non conveniuns tanto apparatui

Thus, the presbytery was enriched with a choir described as: "A beautiful and praiseworthy choir, presbytery, benches, and ornaments". The choir and its inlays were intended to guide the faithful toward deeper spiritual and intellectual reflection.

On March 12, 1524, Lorenzo Lotto and the overseers of the Misericordia Maggiore Congregation formalized an agreement for the creation of designs for the choir's inlays in the Marian basilica.

The presidents of the Bergamo Misericordia Consortium [...] on one side, and Master Lorenzo Lotto of Venice, painter, on the other

— Francesca Cortesi Bosco

Among the overseers was Trussardo da Calepio II, nephew of Ambrogio Calepio, with Giacomo Grumelli serving as president.

Detailed documentation of the Santa Maria Maggiore inlays exists, drawn from archival records and Lotto's own correspondence.. The project centered on Giovan Francesco Capoferri, a young and skilled inlayer from Lovere, who, on October 23, 1522, was tasked with constructing a new choir for Santa Maria Maggiore, the city's civic church. The Misericordia Consortium oversaw the work, opting to inlay the front seats of the choir—reserved for the clergy—while leaving the lay seats behind the altar undecorated. Four larger inlays were also planned for the ends of the seats facing the nave. Capoferri had honed his craft—preparing, working, and staining wood for inlays—under Fra Damiano da Bergamo during the creation of the choir for the Church of Santo Stefano. Fra Damiano Zambelli felt slighted for not being chosen for the project, despite his familiarity with Lotto and Capoferri, his pupil. In 1526, while both Lotto and Capoferri were in Venice, Lotto distanced himself from the city, writing to the congregation:

[...] Thus, you are all indebted to me, especially Master Giovan Francesco, your inlayer, whom I greet and commend, and tell him that I have written to him several times without receiving a reply; for this, I still love and honor his virtue in absence, as it is my Christian nature and religion to do so, and whoever errs does so to his own detriment. He knows well that for his honor and benefit, I have acted as a brother, enduring the insults of the ignorant, irreligious Fra Damiano; for this reason, I chose to lodge where I am, at greater expense than elsewhere, so that his malicious nature and judgment might be known and seen. Yet I do not seek to reproach Master Giovan Francesco or demand any recompense from him beyond common friendship [...]|L. Chiodi, "Lettere inedite di Lorenzo Lotto," 1968

The architectural design was executed by Bernardo Zenale, while Giovanni Belli of Ponteranica, a carpenter, assisted Capoferri. Initially, the commission cautiously assigned the preparatory cartoons to multiple artists, with Lotto providing one for an Annunciation (Lorenzo Lotto). The first seven cartoons were also to be produced by Nicolino di Bartolomeo Cabrini, a little-known local artist, who died in 1524 from a severe head injury sustained in an accident, despite treatment by the surgeon Battista Cucchi. Subsequently, in March 1524, the overseers contracted Lotto for all remaining inlays, agreeing to a payment of 9 lire for narrative scenes and 1 lira 14 soldi for covers, regardless of size

Lotto's designs, or invenzioni, for the inlays accounted for the natural light, employing chiaroscuro techniques in the cartoons. He deemed the presbytery's lighting insufficient and factored in the 14 small oculi in the central dome. By 1524, Lotto had delivered nine cartoons for figured inlays, eight for covers, and two for the sides of chair pedestals, which Capoferri translated with fidelity and skill. In 1525, Lotto supplied seven more cartoons (one large), four cover designs, and two additional seat-side designs. Occasionally, he returned to refine the inlays' final outlining

Disputes over payment soon arose between Lotto and the Consortium, as the artist found his compensation inadequate. When his request for an increase was denied, he ceased outlining the inlays. The conflict persisted beyond his departure for Venice in December 1525, likely influencing his decision never to return to Bergamo to avoid unpaid work.

Distance complicated but did not halt the delivery of designs: epistolary instructions flowed between artist and patrons as Lotto completed the series until 1532, when collaboration ended, leaving eight cartoons unfinished. The extensive correspondence (1524–1532) reveals a deteriorating relationship, with Lotto repeatedly—and unsuccessfully—requesting payment and the return of his cartoons, fearing unauthorized use.

Unbeknownst to Lotto, the original plan was altered, with covers mounted as decorations on the lay stalls, disrupting the intended iconographic program for purely decorative purposes. In July 1530, the choir and stalls began installation in the presbytery of the basilica, with Lotto sending his final six imprese designs in January of the following year.

Capoferri died in 1534 at age 47, having completed his work on Lotto's designs. Relations between the two had soured, leaving Capoferri's family in financial hardship, reliant on public charity. In the cover for Giuseppe venduto dai fratelli, Lotto included a self-portrait alongside Capoferri's, symbolizing their once-eternal friendship, which time proved otherwise.

Between 1554 and 1555, Capoferri's sons, Zinino and Alfonso, completed the grand Bergamo choir, adding the lay section. Lorenzo Lotto died in Loreto, where he had settled in 1556, never seeing his work finished—a project spanning fifty years, finalized between 1572 and 1573. It was proudly displayed by the Fondazione MIA mayors during the 1575 pastoral visit of Saint Charles Borromeo.

The definitive study of the Capoferri and Lotto inlays is Francesca Cortesi Bosco's 1987 monograph. The imprese imagery resists immediate interpretation, preserving a mystery that invites diverse readings. This enigmatic quality aligns with the mystery of creation and divinity, posing questions with multiple potential answers. While rooted in Lotto's historical context, the depictions transcend their time, defying temporal logic.

Despite his reluctance, Lotto faced severe financial straits by August 1550, resorting to a lottery sale of some works and preparatory inlay drawings.

In 2023, the inlays, covers, and entire choir underwent a significant cleaning and restoration, restoring their original brilliance. The process was conducted live, allowing numerous visitors to observe each phase.

The 2023 restoration, coinciding with Bergamo and Brescia's designation as Capitals of Culture, revitalized the inlays and covers, reclaiming their original color and luster. An earlier restoration in the 19th century, led by Luciano Gritti's workshop under Stefano Marziali's scientific direction, preceded this effort. The year-and-a-half-long recovery drew many tourists and students.

Among the choir's inlays is one at the left entrance, titled by Lotto as Amor sulla Bilancia, depicting Nosce te ipsum.

== Description ==
The choir comprises multiple stalls divided into two sections: one for the clergy near the main altar and another for the laity in the rectangular presbytery closer to the nave.

=== The choir and inlays or invenzioni ===
The choir is enclosed within a wooden barrier, open at the center and crowned by a large arch, allowing the faithful to follow liturgical services. Inside, it has twenty-six stalls reserved for the chapter. Three steps lead to the altar, flanked by two large benches, each with three stalls—historically assigned to the presbyters on the left and Venetian rectors on the right. Beyond these are seventeen stalls for prominent citizens, typically deputies of the Minor Council or regents of the Misericordia Maggiore Congregation. This layout reflects the church's lay character: the bishop, when not officiating, was not permitted to sit centrally but took a lateral position, as the rectors sought autonomy from ecclesiastical authority.

Though the inlays' creator was granted considerable ideological freedom, a theological consultant, the Franciscan Girolamo Terzi, was appointed to refine the chosen Old Testament themes. Terzi received his first payment for this role on May 2, 1523.

From 1526 to 1531, while preparing the cartoons or biblical invenzioni, Lorenzo Lotto resided in Venice, attending public philosophical and theological debates by prominent preachers at the Basilica dei Santi Giovanni e Paolo. These orations, later posted on the church portals for public access, significantly influenced his work. In Venice, he engaged with the biblical scholar Friar Ludovico Martini and the renowned preacher Damiano Loro, likely discussing the biblical themes he was to depict as "stories." These sermons inspired Lotto to write to the Consortium about the episode of Joshua Stopping the Sun. According to historian Cortesi Bosco, Lotto possessed religious knowledge surpassing common understanding.

=== The covers or imprese ===
On June 16, 1524, impressed by the work's growing quality and anticipating wear over time, the consortium requested protective covers for the inlays—movable lids, "picture a claro et obscuro," designed in monochrome, unlike the polychrome main panels. These covers were to feature symbols and allusions to the underlying scenes. On September 16, 1527, Lotto requested additional imprese options to select the most fitting ones: "And regarding the imprese, let them be sent to me in greater rather than fewer numbers, so I may choose those most suitable for a given subject".

Lotto termed these imprese, noting their often elusive meaning. On February 10, 1528, he wrote:

Regarding the cover designs, know that they are things which, without being written, require the imagination to bring them to light: thus, not one has come to me spontaneously, and I am not surprised, for I am poorly rewarded by you, indeed belittled, insulted, and threatened in your letters. Patience. I will emerge, God willing, with the faithful efforts I have expressed thus far as a man's duty, even beyond, by my nature

— Lorenzo Lotto, Letter to the Regents of the Misericordia

Lotto was a close friend of Giovanmaria Rota, son of Francesco and a counselor of the Misericordia Congregation, who had studied alchemy with leading alchemists of the era. Rota likely imparted the hermetic-alchemical knowledge essential for crafting the covers.

The creation of the inlay covers stands as a unique case in art history, exemplifying spiritual reflection intended to guide viewers through a contemplative journey to the biblical narratives beneath. Lotto's profound and hypnotic exploration owed much to Giovan Battista Suardi, a nobleman, poet, and art enthusiast fluent in Latin—an area where Lotto was deficient. In 1524, Suardi commissioned frescoes for the Suardi Chapel, forging a close bond with Lotto. Highly regarded by the congregation's mayors—having once served as president—Suardi contributed the Latin mottos for three inlays. The alchemical-spiritual metaphors suggest a broader circle of intellectually engaged individuals understood these designs. On August 20 of that year, Lotto and Suardi delivered designs for two covers at the entrance to the Clergy Choir. The clergy recognized the deep alchemical-spiritual metaphors, which, though obscure to casual observers, resonated with the basilica's well-educated priests. Bergamo's bishop was Pietro Lippomano, and Lotto had met Giovanni Aurelio Augurelli in 1503, who dedicated his book Geronticon to the future bishop—evidence of the intellectual milieu surrounding Lotto and Bergamo.

The covers form a meditative itinerary, serving as a "theater of memory" for 16th-century Venetian humanistic knowledge.

Lotto viewed art as a means to comprehend creation and faith, akin to alchemy, though its meaning is not always readily decipherable. He imbued the inlays with a personal vision of scripture, rendered in the archetypal Renaissance Venetian style of the early 16th century—a period of intense anti-Lutheran debate. His ability to weave symbolic imagery with Greco-Roman mythology and pagan themes, merged through metaphoric depictions with biblical narratives, stands out.

Lotto's work spanned seven years, marked by occasional disputes with the congregation's regents, possibly due to his candid revelation of alchemical secrets.

== Lotto's inlays ==
#	Image	Subject	Year	Dimensions	Cover	Subject	Year	Dimensions
01		Sommersione del faraone	1526–1527	68 × 99.8 cm		Impresa	1526–1527	75.7 × 109.5 cm
02		Arca di Noè	1525	68 × 101 cm		Restauratio humana	1525	76.5 × 109.5 cm
03		Giuditta	1527	68 × 100.3 cm		Viduitatis gloria	1527	75.2 × 109.5 cm
04		Davide e Golia	1525–1526	68 × 101 cm		Maximi certaminis victoria	1525–1526	76.5 × 109.5 cm
05		Creazione del mondo e di Adamo	c. 1524	44 × 45.6 cm		Chaos magnum	c. 1524	60 × 50 cm
06		Creazione di Eva, Peccato originale e Cacciata dei progenitori	1524	44 × 46 cm		Quia comedisti de ligno	1524	60 × 50 cm
07		Sacrificio di Caino e Abele	1524	44 × 46 cm		Sacrifici di Caino e di Abele	c. 1524	50 × 60 cm
08		Morte di Abele	1524	44 × 46 cm		Pietas inobedientia	c. 1524	60 × 50 cm
09		Sacrificio di Enoc	1524	44 × 46 cm		Musica	c. 1524	60 × 50 cm
10		Enos	1524	44 × 46 cm		Tubalis [sic] sacra musicae inventum	1524	60 × 50 cm
11		Ebbrezza di Noè	1524	44 × 46 cm		Simboli bacchici	c. 1524	60 × 50 cm
12		Melchisedek offre il sacrificio	c. 1524	44 × 46 cm		Victoria	c. 1524	60 × 50 cm
13		Incesto di Lot e incendio della Pentapoli	1526–1527	44 × 46 cm				
14		Sacrificio di Abramo	1524	44 × 46 cm		Sacrificio di Abramo	1529	43 × 41 cm
15		Giuseppe venduto dai fratelli	1524	44 × 46 cm		Fratrum quoque gratia rara est	1524	60 × 50 cm
16		Sansone in sacrificio	1529 or 1530	44 × 46 cm		Symbols	1529 or 1530	60 × 50 cm
17		Sansone caccia le volpi nelle messi	1529 or 1530	44 × 46 cm		Symbols	1529 or 1530	60 × 50 cm
18		Sansone uccide i filistei con una mascella d'asino e porta sul monte le porte della città	1529 or 1530	44 × 46 cm		Symbols	1529 or 1530	60 × 50 cm
19		Sansone tradito da Dalila, accecato e alla macina	1529 or 1530	44 × 46 cm		Symbols	1529 or 1530	60 × 50 cm
20		Davide esce da Gerusalemme con l'arca dell'alleanza	1525–1527	44 × 46 cm		Humilitatis et pacienciae exemplum	1527	60 × 50 cm
21		Assalonne, Cusai e Achitofel in consiglio	1526–1527	44 × 46 cm		Due uomini che precipitano in un abisso	1527	60 × 50 cm
22		Ribellione di Absalon al padre	1526–1527	44 × 46 cm		Divina vindicta impietatis	1527	60 × 50 cm
23		Pianto di Davide	1526–1527	44 × 46 cm		Heu fili mi	1527	60 × 50 cm
24		Amasa ucciso da Joab	c. 1524	44 × 46 cm		Uomo coronato d'alloro in un cerchio, con spada sguainata e pugnale	c. 1524	60 × 50 cm
25		Elia fugge Gezabele	c. 1527	44 × 46 cm		Surge comede	c. 1527	60 × 50 cm
26		Ester e Assuero	1527	44 × 46 cm				
27		La Maccabea	1525	44 × 46 cm		Poti	c. 1525	60 × 50 cm
28		Adorazione del serpente di bronzo	1525	44 × 46 cm		Symbols	1527	60 × 50 cm
29		La legge data a Mosè	1525	44 × 46 cm		Tavole della Legge	1527	60 × 50 cm
30		Amnon violante Tamar	1525	44 × 46 cm		Impresa	1527	60 × 50 cm
31		Amnon ucciso da Assalonne	1525	44 × 46 cm		Uomo in cerchio che uccide di spada un altro uomo coronato	1525	60 × 50 cm
32		Giona e la balena	1525	44 × 46 cm		Figura recuperationis nostrae	1527	60 × 50 cm
33		Susanna e i vecchioni	1524	44 × 46 cm		Pocius mori	c. 1524	60 × 50 cm

Lotto's biblical scenes exhibit boundless scenic imagination, with a fluid narrative starkly distinct from the lofty, composed tones of Titian's works from the same period. Popular elements abound, particularly in the biblical episodes, paired with erudite, sometimes cryptic symbolism in the covers—yet broadly effective and immediate. The covers follow the style of heraldic emblems, featuring symbolic objects artfully juxtaposed and accompanied by brief mottos clarifying their meaning. This created evocative, memorable images that aided the clergy in meditating on the biblical episodes' significance.

Amid their complex meanings—drawn from scholasticism and philosophy—alchemical references emerge, tied to messages promoting asceticism. In the era's culture, the transformation of metals paralleled the soul's spiritual refinement.. This is evident in the Restauratio humana cover above Arca di Noè on the choir's front. Above the floating ark, a pole bears alchemical tools: a touchstone pouch, a crucible with seven metal rods, and a balance. The implication is that, just as Noah renewed humanity through his ark (Restauratio), individuals must purify their souls toward perfection and beatitude, akin to alchemists transforming metals into gold. Lotto was likely familiar with these themes from his youth in Treviso, where Hermes Trismegistus's texts, translated by Marsilio Ficino, were published in 1471, and where Giovanni Aurelio Augurelli, author of an alchemical poem, resided between 1503 and 1505

Among the most striking compositions is Davide e Golia, crafted as a double perspectival box with subtle chiaroscuro effects: in the foreground, David strikes the giant with his sling; to the left, the subsequent decapitation unfolds; and in the background to the right, the young hero carries Goliath's head into the city

== Bibliography ==
- Pesanti, Pietro (1936). La basilica di S. Maria Maggiore in Bergamo. Stamperia editrice commerciale.
- Franco-Loiri Locatelli, Andreina (1998). "La Basilica di Santa Maria Maggiore". La Rivista di Bergamo (12–13).
- Zanchi, Mauro (1997). Lorenzo Lotto e l'immaginario alchemico. Clusone: Ferrari Editrice. ISBN 88-86475-78-0.
- Pirovano, Carlo (2002). Lotto. Milano: Electa. ISBN 88-435-7550-3.
- D'Adda, Roberta (2004). Lotto mojego. Milano: Skira.
- Zanchi, Mauro (2003). La Bibbia secondo Lorenzo Lotto. Il coro ligneo della Basilica di Bergamo intarsiato da Capoferri. Clusone, Bergamo: E-Qua. ISBN 978-88-906149-5-8.
- Cortesi Bosco, Francesca (1987). Il coro intarsiato di Lotto e Capoferri per Santa Maria Maggiore in Bergamo. Milano: Credito Bergamasco.
- Zanchi, Mauro (2016). In principio sarà il Sole. Il coro simbolico di Lorenzo Lotto. Firenze-Milano: Giunti. ISBN 978-88-09-83057-8.
- Benigni, Corrado; Zanchi, Mauro (2023). Lorenzo Lotto. Lettere. Corrispondenze per il coro intarsiato. Officina Libraria.
- Zanchi, Mauro. Lotto i Simboli. Giunti. ISBN 978-88-09-76478-1.

== See also ==
- Renaissance art
- Renaissance art in Bergamo and Brescia
- Lorenzo Lotto
- Giovan Francesco Capoferri
- Basilica of Santa Maria Maggiore
