= Intarsia =

Form of wood inlaying

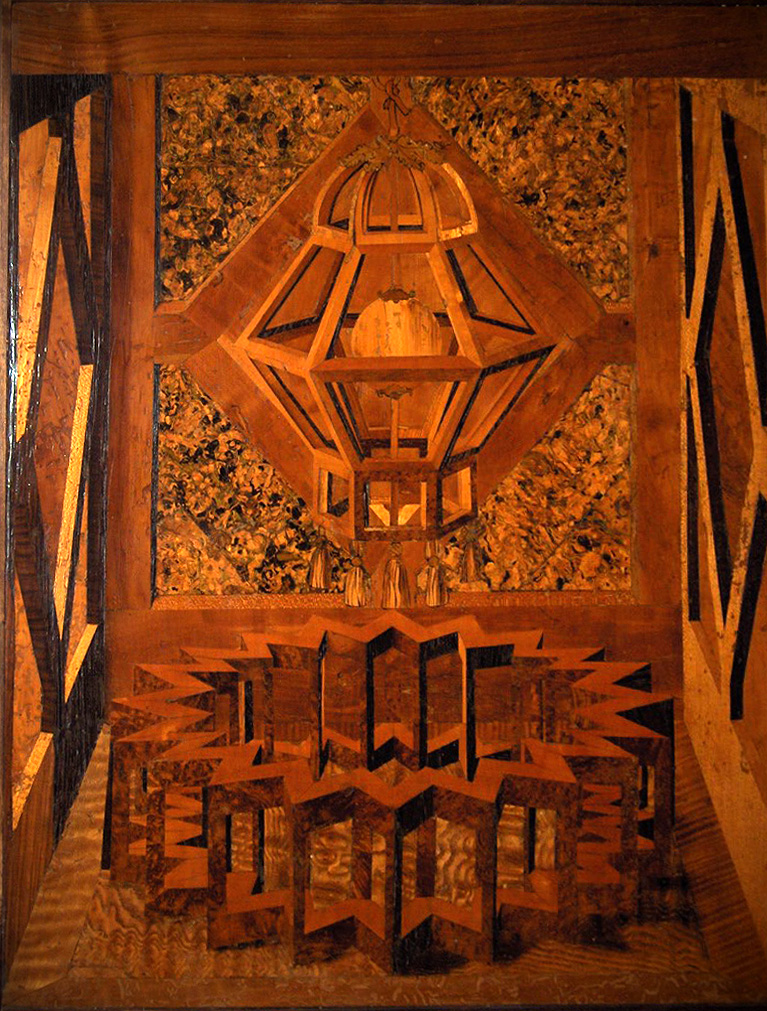
Geometric figure (1537), intarsia by fra Damiano da Bergamo; Museum of the Basilica of Saint Dominic, Bologna, Italy

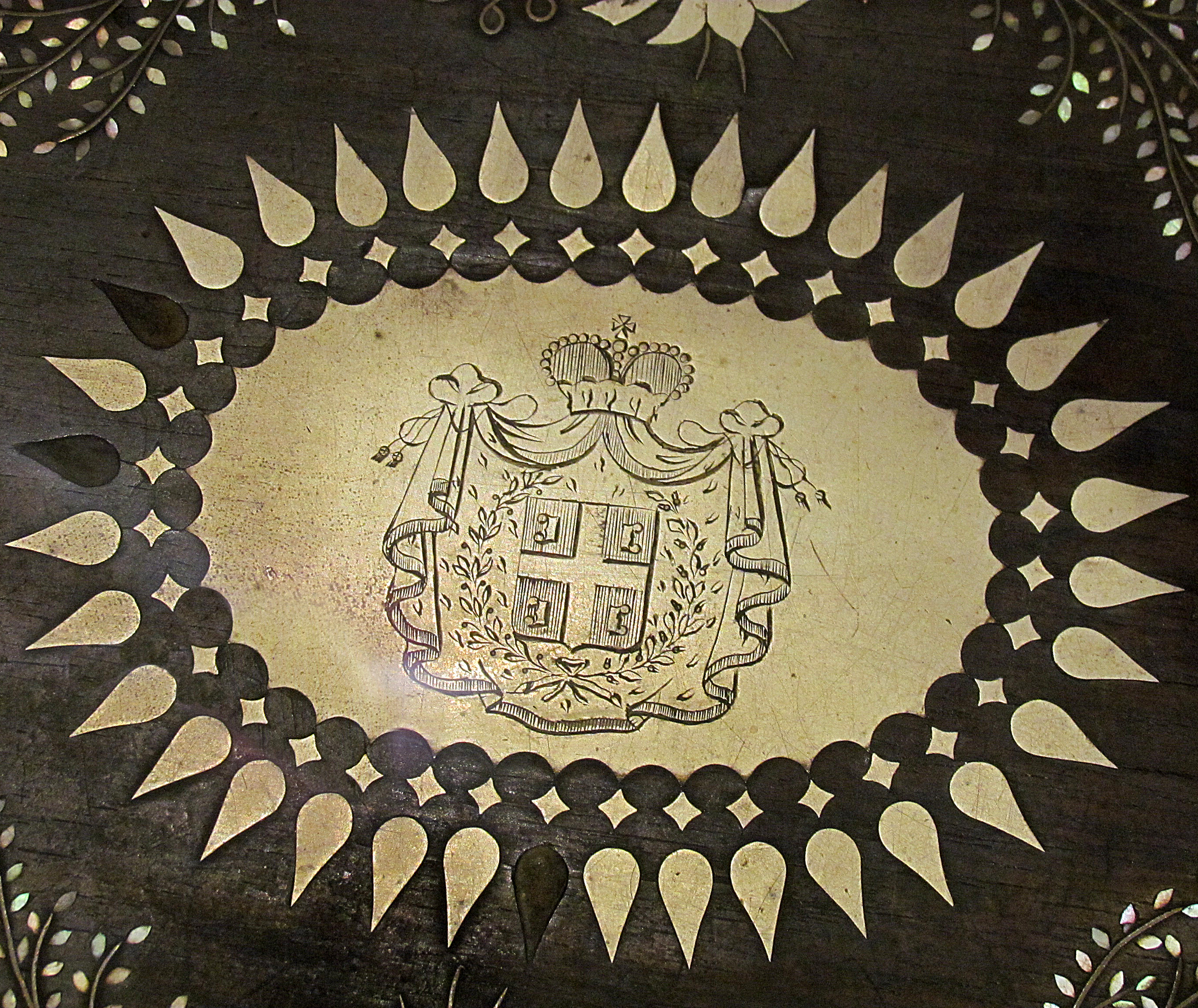
Intarsia on the First aid kit of Alexander Karađorđević, Prince of Serbia, Historical Museum of Serbia

Intarsia is a form of wood inlaying that is similar to marquetry. The practice dates from before the 7th century AD. The technique inserts sections of wood (at times with contrasting ivory or bone, or mother-of-pearl) within the solid wood matrix of floors and walls or of tabletops and other furniture; by contrast marquetry assembles a pattern out of veneers glued upon the carcass.

Certosina is a variant also using pieces of ivory, bone or mother of pearl. Intarsia is mostly used in Italian, or at least European work. Similar techniques are found over much of Asia and the Middle East.

The word is from the Italian, derived from Arabic.

== History ==
=== Overview ===
When Egypt came under Arab rule in the seventh century, indigenous arts of intarsia and wood inlay, which lent themselves to non-representational decors and tiling patterns, spread throughout the Maghreb. The technique of intarsia was already perfected in Islamic North Africa before it was introduced into Christian Europe through Sicily and Andalusia. The art was further developed in Siena and by Sienese masters at the cathedral of Orvieto, where figurative intarsia made their first appearance, c. 1330 and continuing into the 15th century and in northern Italy in the fifteenth and sixteenth centuries, spreading to German centers and introduced into London by Flemish craftsmen in the later sixteenth century. The most elaborate examples of intarsia can be found in cabinets of this period, which were items of great luxury and prestige. Multiple colors could be used by exploiting differently-colored spalted woods. After about 1620, marquetry tended to supplant intarsia in urbane cabinet work.

Intarsia gained popularity in the United States in the 1980s as a wooden art technique using a band saw or scroll saw. Early practitioners made money both by selling their art, and by selling patterns for others to use. In France Georges Vriz proposed a new method for marquetry. Contrary to other techniques, based on a decoration "flat" made of wood or other material, Vriz superimposed the layers of wood using thin, transparent elements that impart color and depth.

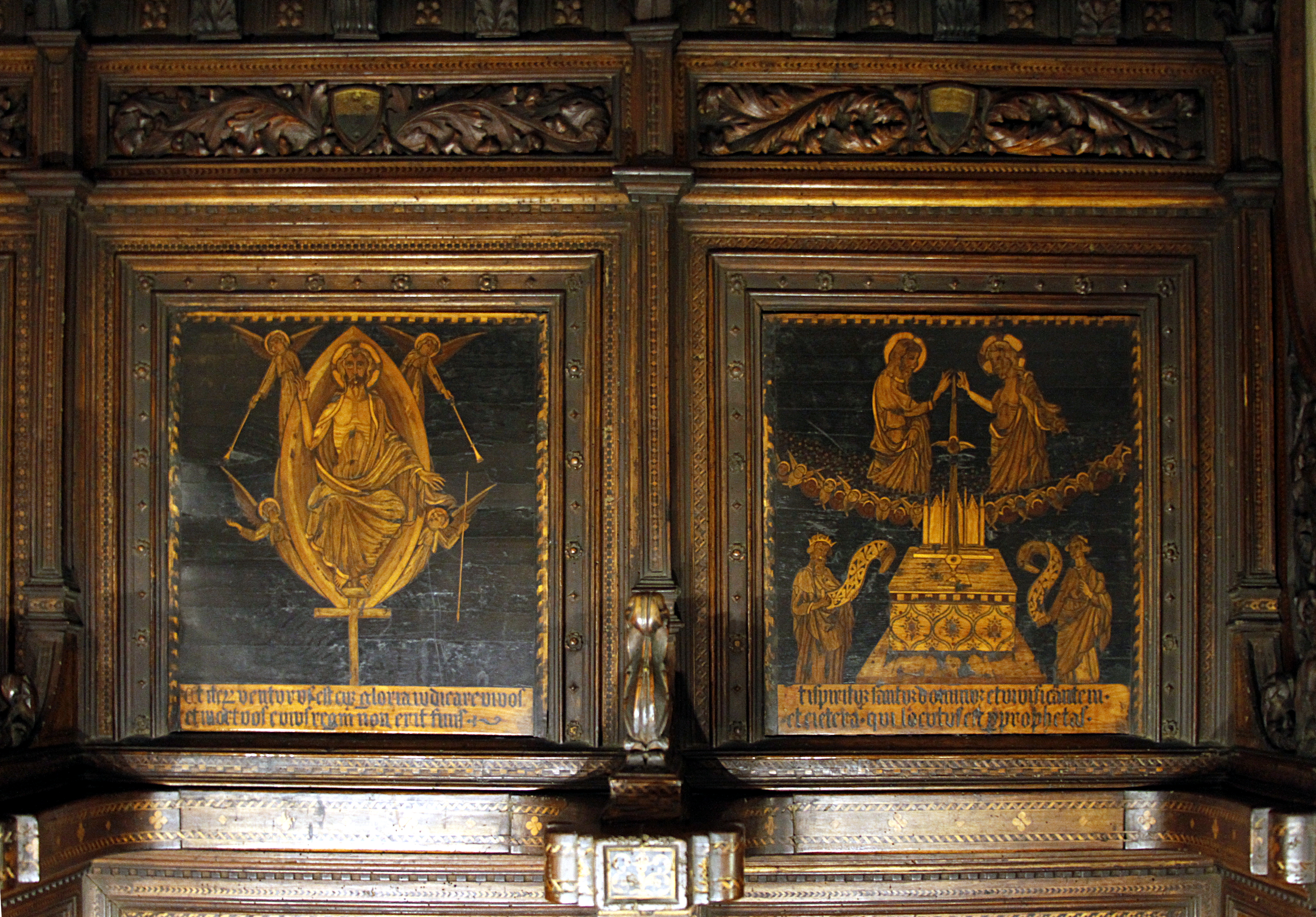
Domenico di Niccolò dei Cori, wooden choir of the chapel of the Palazzo Pubblico, Siena

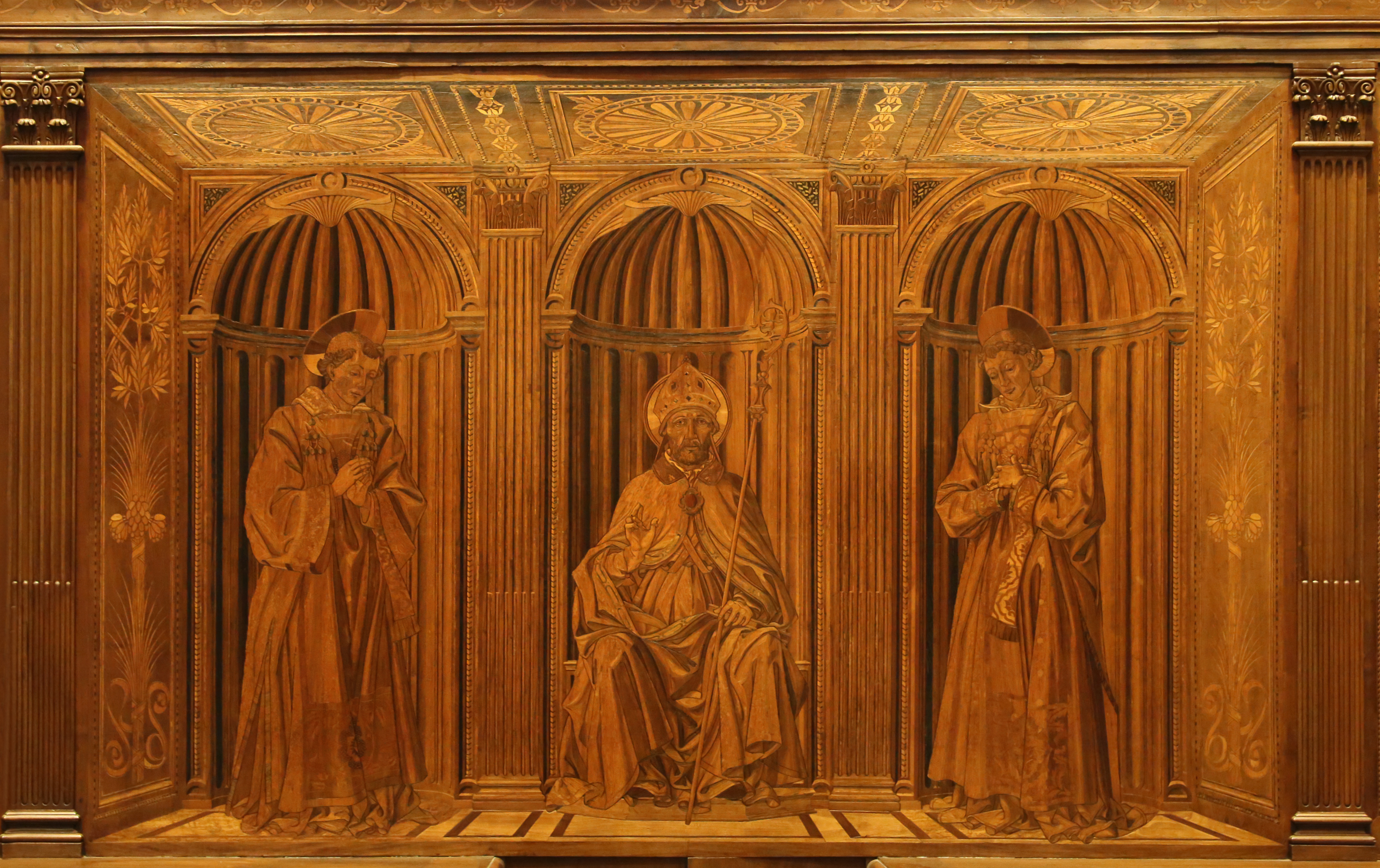
Giuliano da Maiano and Alesso Baldovinetti, Intarsia of the Sagrestia delle Messe, Florence Cathedral

=== Renaissance intarsia of the Quattrocento ===
==== Masters of perspective in Florence ====
With the success of linear perspective in Florence, intarsia altered its decorative repertoire, turning toward geometric solids and perspectival views, becoming one of the principal vehicles for transmitting the new perspectival revolution.

==== The Certosa di Pavia ====
Given the high compositional quality, it is believed that important painters active at the Certosa, including Ambrogio Bergognone, Iacopino de Mottis and Bernardo Zenale, supplied the models for the intarsia.

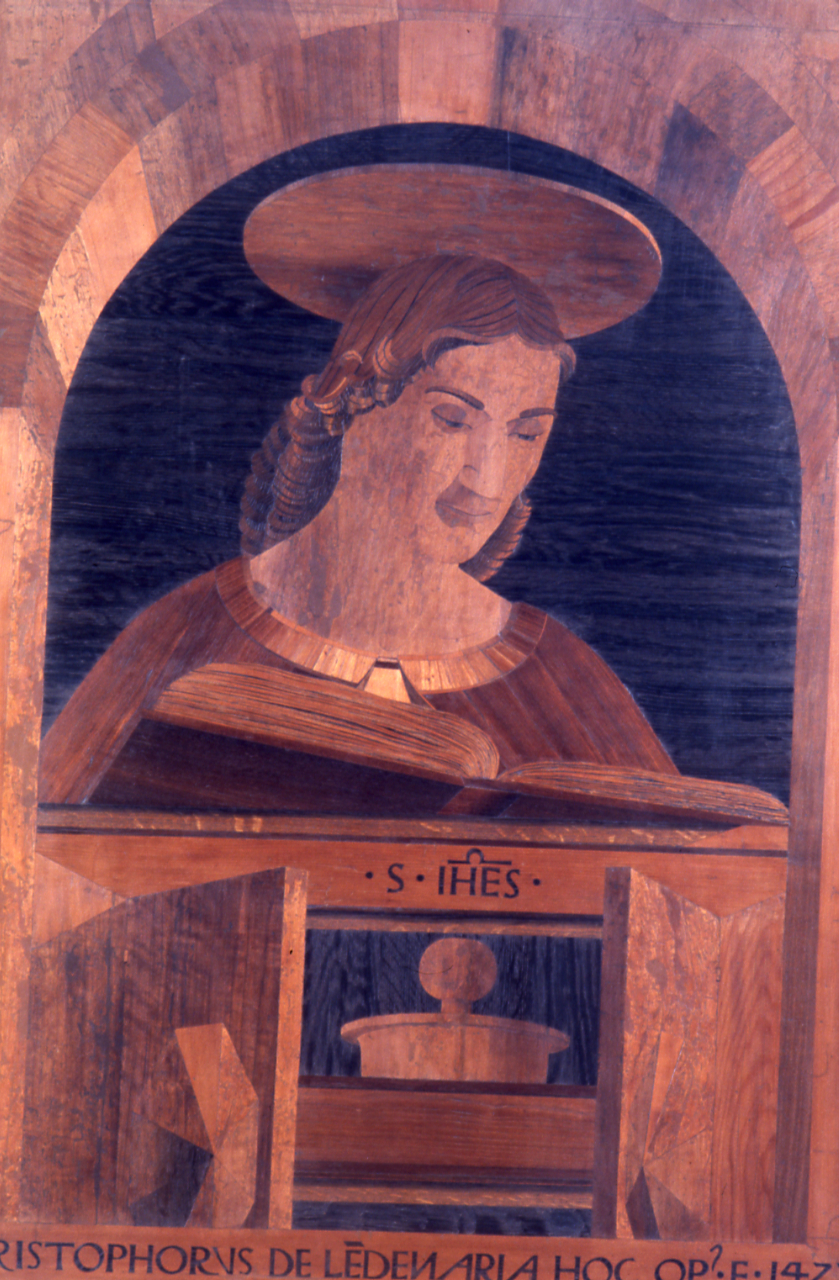
Cristoforo Canozi, Evangelists, signed and dated 1477, Modena Cathedral

==== The workshop of the Canozi of Lendinara ====
Giovanni Maria Platina, the most accomplished pupil of Cristoforo Canozi, was active in Cremona, producing a reliquary cabinet between 1477 and 1480 and, between 1483 and 1490, the choir of Cremona Cathedral.

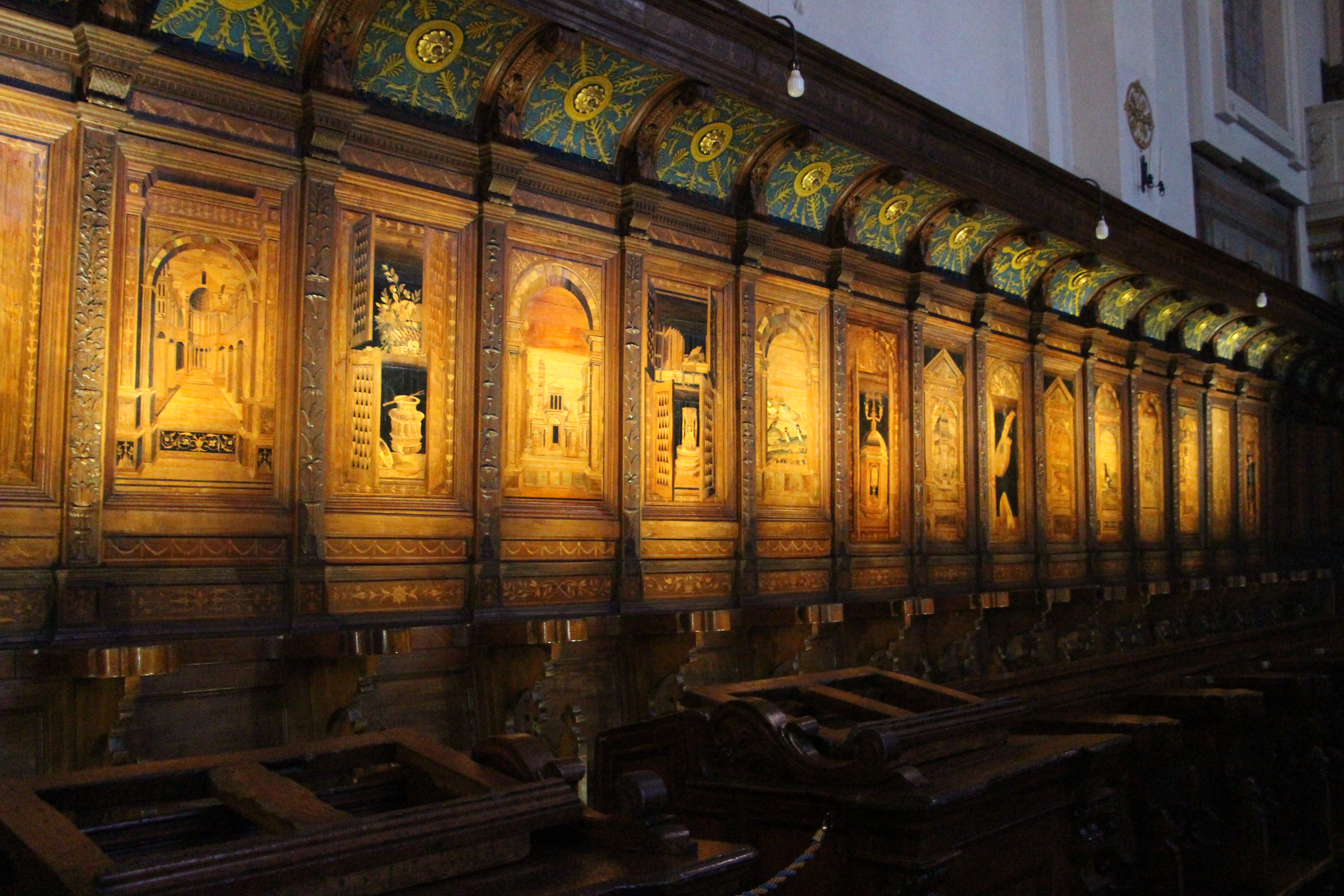
Fra Giovanni da Verona, choir of Monte Oliveto Maggiore, 1503–1505

==== Giovanni da Verona and the Veneto–Neapolitan manner ====
In Venice worked Fra Sebastiano da Rovigo and his pupil Fra Giovanni da Verona. Between 1491 and 1499 they executed the choir of Santa Maria in Organo in Verona, where the inlays moved beyond the classical geometric repertoire to more intricate compositions. The 27 upper stalls feature backs separated by pilasters: below are Renaissance grotesque motifs, while above arches frame saints, ideal perspective views, or half-open cupboards revealing sacred and secular objects. The work, produced with numerous collaborators including Raffaele da Brescia, was signed by the artist.

Between 1503 and 1505 Fra Giovanni executed the choir of the Abbey of Monte Oliveto Maggiore in Siena; from 1506 to 1511 he worked at the Sant'Anna dei Lombardi convent in Naples, and between 1511 and 1512 on the panelling of the Sala della Segnatura in Rome (lost).

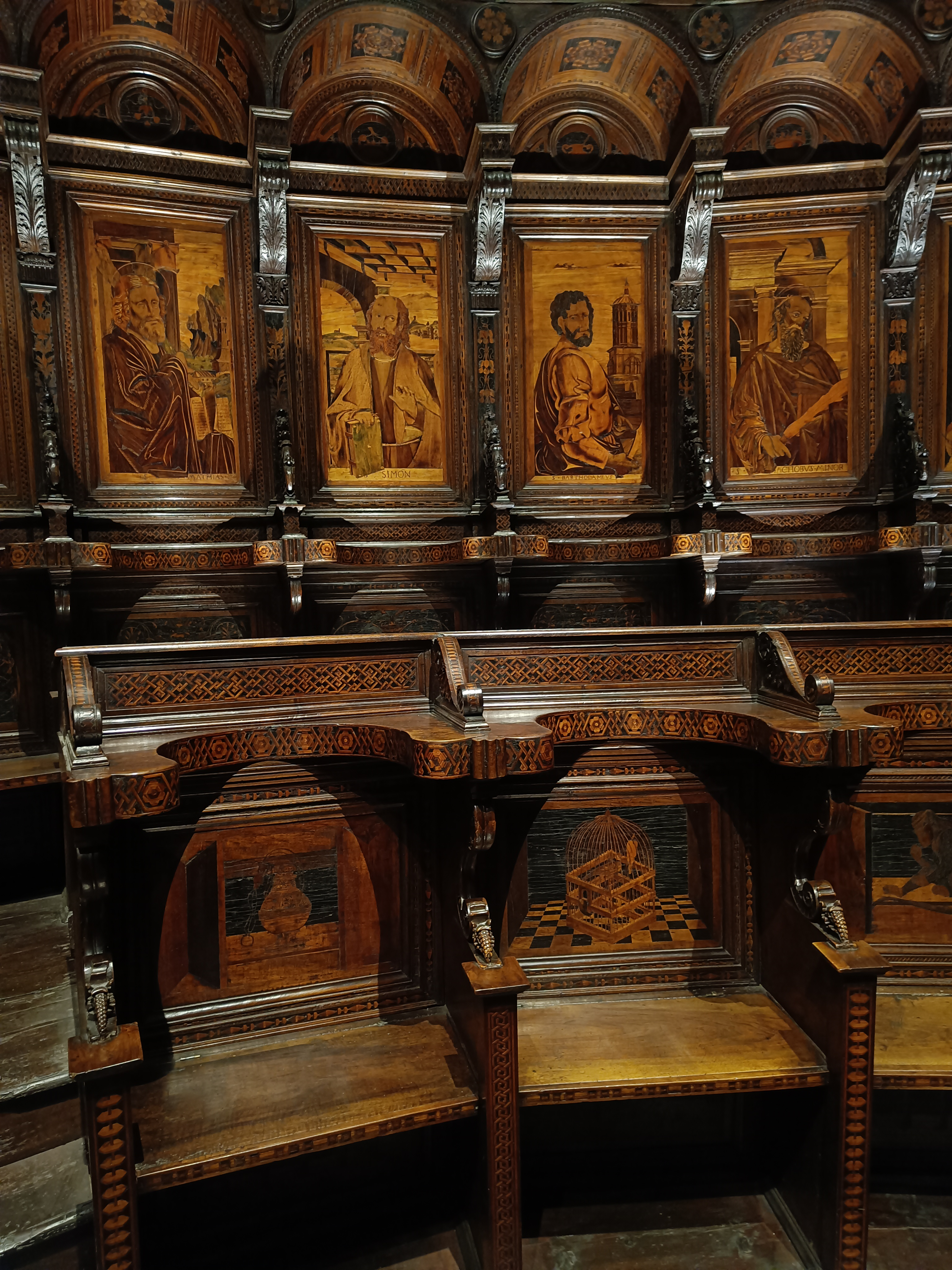
Choir stalls of Savona Cathedral, 1521

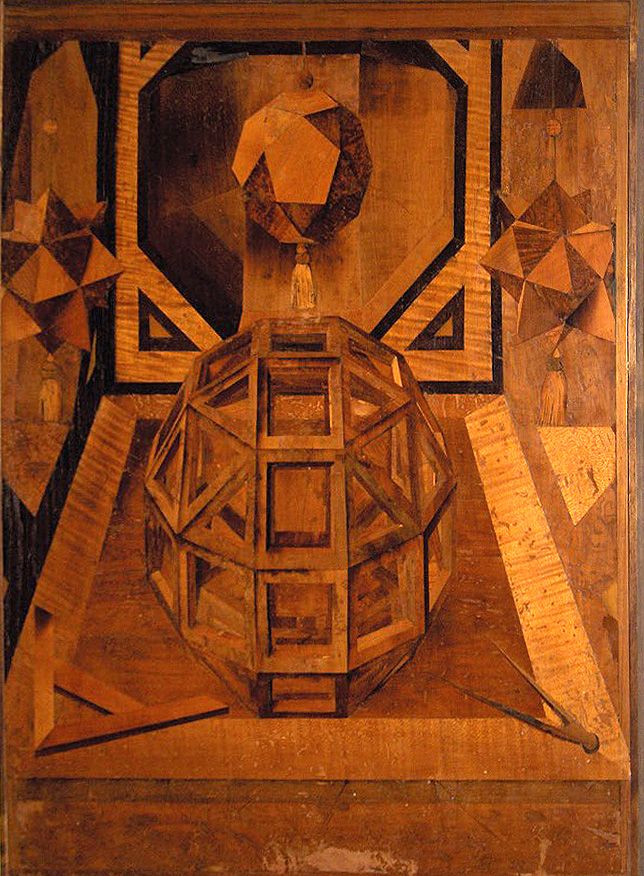
Geometric figure by Fra Damiano Zambelli, Basilica of San Domenico, Bologna

=== Decline ===
The decline of intarsia was linked to its attempt to align itself ever more closely with painting. With the increasing use of stains to compose complex narrative scenes and the abandonment of the traditional repertoire, wood inlay became dependent on painting and was relegated to a display of artisanal virtuosity.

In the twentieth century, the craft was revived by the master from Trani, Andrea Gusmai, who created celebrated works.

== Process ==
Intarsia uses varied shapes, sizes, and species of wood fitted together to create a mosaic-like picture with an illusion of depth. Intarsia is created through the selection of different types of wood, using their grain pattern and coloring to create variations in the pattern. After selecting the specific woods for the pattern, the woodworker cuts, shapes, and finishes each piece. Some areas of the pattern may be raised to create more depth. The completed individual pieces fit together like a jig-saw puzzle, glued to a wooden backer-board cut to the outline of the pattern. This typically creates a three-dimensional effect as seen in the studiolo of the Palazzo Ducale, Urbino.

Marble intarsia (opere di commessi), called pietre dura in English for the semi-precious hardstones combined with colored marbles that are employed, is an intarsia of coloured stones inlaid in white or black marble. Early examples in Florence date from the mid fifteenth century and reached a peak of refinement and complexity in revetments of the Medici Chapel, produced under Medici patronage in the Opificio delle Pietre Dure, which was established by Ferdinando I de' Medici. Later complex designs and refinement of the art developed in Naples circa the beginning of the 17th century. The floor of St. Peter's Basilica in Rome is a particularly notable example of marble intarsia. Later this form of decoration became a feature of baroque interior design, particularly so in the Sicilian Baroque designs following the earthquake of 1693. Intarsia is best restricted to wood-based work.

Today intarsia can be made from purchased patterns. To make intarsia from a pattern, first wood is chosen based on color and grain pattern. Next the pattern is transferred onto the wood and individual pieces are precisely cut out on the band saw or scroll saw. The pieces are then sanded individually or in groups to add depth to the piece. Once the sanding is completed, the wood pieces are fitted together to form the final result. A finish (for example a clear gel stain) can be applied to the individual pieces before gluing, or to the glued final version.

=== Technique and subjects ===
Before proceeding with the inlay using small pieces of wood, a cartoon was prepared, often drawn by professional painters, who entrusted the execution of the works to specialized craftsmen. The technique consisted of juxtaposing woods and, at times, other materials (ivory, bone, or mother-of-pearl), cut so as to fit together perfectly, in order to obtain designs that, in the finest examples, achieved remarkable virtuoso complexity.

The different colors depended on the natural hues of the various types of wood, further varied according to the cut and the inclination of the grain, which altered the refraction of light on the surface. At times the pieces were also dyed by boiling them in coloring substances, while darker tones were usually obtained through scorching with heated irons, generally carried out after installation.

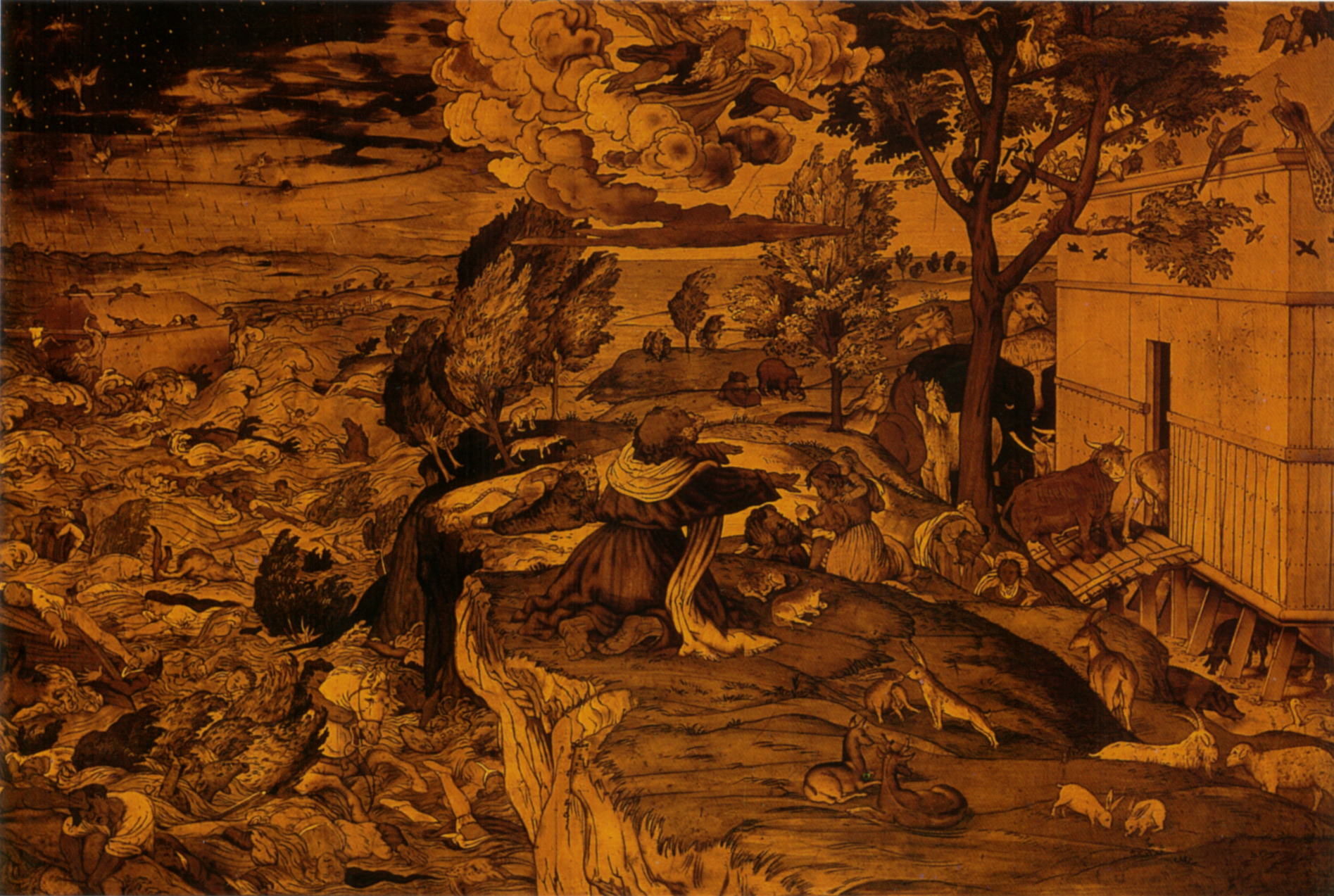
Noah's Ark, from the Tarsie del coro di Santa Maria Maggiore di Bergamo, executed by Capoferri after a design by Lorenzo Lotto

Intarsia was used to decorate small caskets, wedding chests, doors, furniture for sacristies, choir stalls, and for the panelling of choirs and private studioli. During the golden age of the Renaissance, intarsia was closely linked to theoretical concerns, particularly the application of the laws of perspective to create perfect trompe-l'œil effects, making it one of the most widely practiced arts among elite patrons. The intarsia in sacristies or studioli of major princes of the period shared a character of "reflective seclusion", to which the immobile and non-narrative character of the views, cupboards, and depicted objects was perfectly suited. These subjects anticipated the genres of landscape and still life, which in Renaissance painting had not yet achieved independent expressive status.

Frequent motifs included faceted cups, hourglasses, candelabra, compasses, geometric solids, birdcages, pieces of armor, and similar objects. Half-open cupboards were also common, revealing the typical equipment of the humanist scholar, such as books and musical instruments. Not infrequently, such subjects were depicted on the doors of actual built-in cupboards that often contained objects very similar to those represented.

The representations were always governed by the perspectival rules of contemporary painting, and the painters who supplied the cartoons adapted their work to the specific requirements of this decorative genre. It is, for example, impossible to imagine the production of masters such as Lorenzo and Cristoforo da Lendinara without the influence of the silent and geometrically ordered views of Piero della Francesca.

== Woodcarvers ==
- Domenico di Niccolò, known as "dei cori" (Siena, 1362 – before 1453)
- Giovanni Di Michele
- Antonio Barili (Siena, 1453 – c. 1529)
- Giuliano da Maiano (Maiano, c. 1432 – Naples, 17 October 1490)
- Benedetto da Maiano (Maiano, 1442 – Florence, 24 May 1497)
- Arduino da Baiso (Modena, c. 1385 – Modena, 1454)
- Lorenzo Canozi, also known as Lorenzo da Lendinara, Lorenzo Genesini (Lendinara, 1425 – Padua, 20 March 1477)
- Pier Antonio degli Abbati (Modena, c. 1430 – Rovigo, c. 1504)
- Paolo and Antonio della Mola
- Baccio Pontelli (Florence, c. 1450 – Urbino, c. 1494)
- Agostino de Marchi (Crema, 1435 – Bologna, c. 1502)
- Fra Giovanni da Verona (c. 1457 – 1525)
- Fra Raffaele da Brescia (Brescia, 1479? – Rome, 1539)
- Fra Damiano Zambelli, Damiano da Bergamo (Zogno, c. 1490 – Bologna, 30 August 1549)
- Giovan Francesco Capoferri, or Capodiferro (Lovere, 1487 – Bergamo, 1534)

== See also ==
- Cosmatesque
- Cosmati
- Damascening
- Duomo di Siena
- Lathart
- Pietra dura
- Cabinetry
- Wood carving
- Furniture

== Bibliography ==
- Amedeo Benedetti (2004). "Legno, ebanisteria, falegnameria, cesteria, intarsio, mobili". Bibliografia Artigianato. La manualistica artigiana del Novecento: pubblicazioni su arti e mestieri in Italia dall'Unita ad oggi [Craft bibliography. 20th-century craft manuals: publications on arts and trades in Italy from Unification to the present]. Genoa: Erga. pp. 303–320. ISBN 88-8163-358-2.
- Buganza, S. (2006). Il coro inarsiato. Parma: Certosa di Pavia.
- De Vecchi, Pierluigi (1999). Cerchiari, Elda (ed.). I tempi dell'arte [The times of art]. Vol. 2. Milan: Bompiani. ISBN 88-451-7212-0.
- Cosimo, Lanzo (1983). Andrea Gusmai e le sue tarsie [Andrea Gusmai and his intarsia]. Fasano: Schena Editore.
- Lucco, Mauro (2009). L'armadio intarsiato di Giovanni Platina [Giovanni Platina's inlaid cabinet]. Cinisello Balsamo: Silvana Editoriale.
- Piglione, C.; Tasso, F., eds. (2000). Arti minori [Minor arts]. Milano: Jaca Book.
- Arcangeli, Francesco (2014). Tarsie [Intarsia]. Postfazione di Massimo Ferretti (Riproduzione facsimilare dell'edizione: Roma, Tumminelli, 1942 ed.). Pisa: Edizioni della Normale. ISBN 978-88-7642-511-0.
- Zuffi, Stefano (2004). Il Quattrocento [The 1400s]. Milan: Electa. ISBN 8837023154.
