= Ponteranica Altarpiece =

1522 polyptych by Lorenzo Lotto

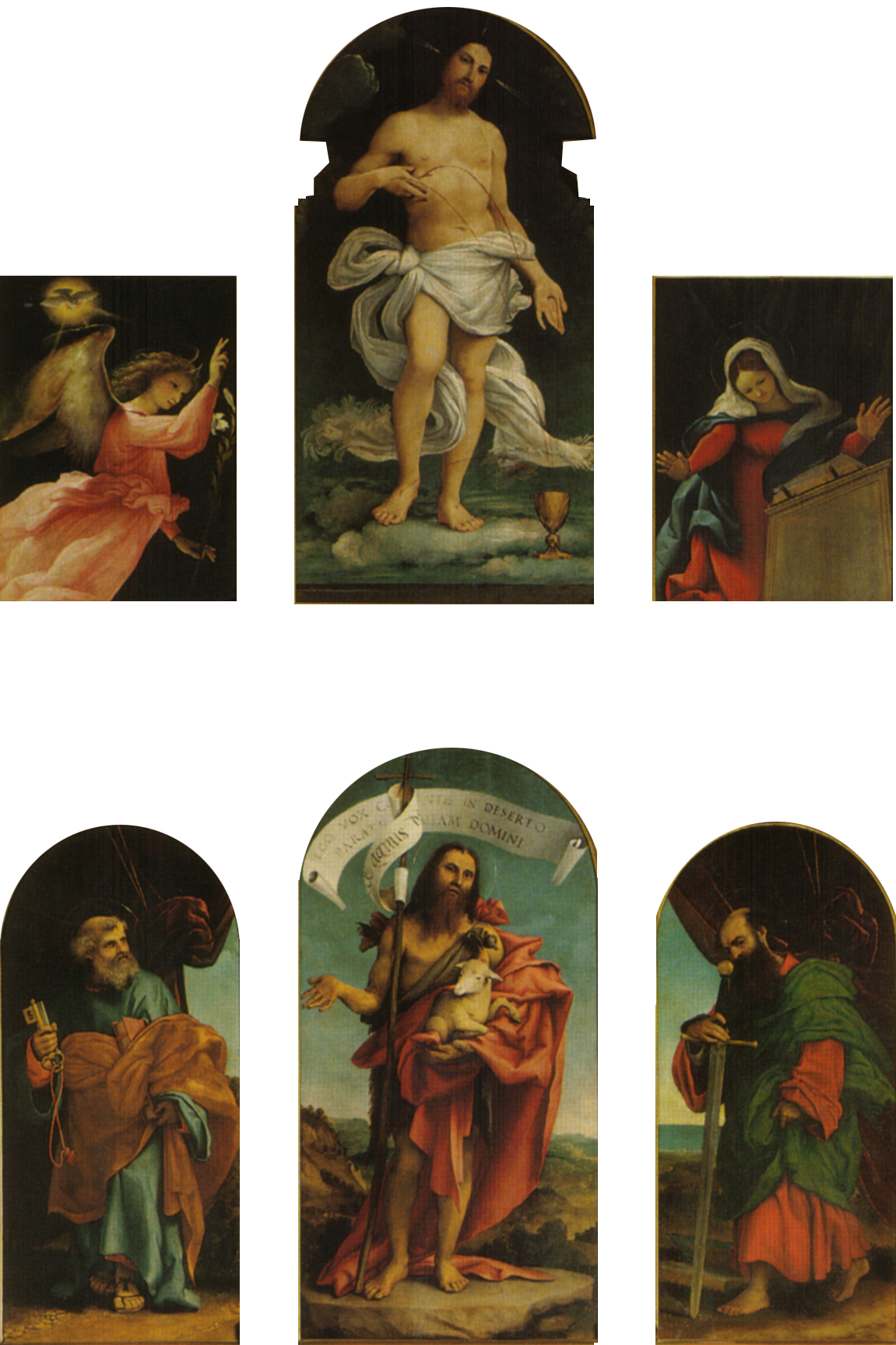
- Artist: Lorenzo Lotto
- Year: 1522
- Medium: Oil on panel
- Dimensions: 270 cm × 140 cm (110 in × 55 in)
- Location: Chiesa di San Vincenzo e Sant'Alessandro, Ponteranica

The Ponteranica Altarpiece is a six-panel oil painting series produced by Lorenzo Lotto in 1522, commissioned by the Scuola del Corpo di Cristo for the parish church of San Vincenzo e Sant'Alessandro in Ponteranica, where it still remains. Its upper register shows the risen Christ flanked by an Annunciation scene, whilst below is John the Baptist flanked by saints Peter and Paul.

== History ==
The altarpiece, intended for the parish center at the entrance of the Val Brembana valley, was commissioned from Lotto by the Scuolo del Corpo di Cristo, the patrons of the altar of the piece. It was not easy to commission works from Lotto at the time, while he was in Bergamo and his works in high demand. The artist, however, knew Giovanni Belli of the Catholic organization Congregazione della Misericordia Maggiore from signing a contract for an inlay work, Wooden inlays of Santa Maria Maggiore (Bergamo). Belli had also been elected as a mayor in the parish of Ponteranica on April 15, 1520. Belli had known Lotto during the commission of the Bergamo inlays, and Lotto had given Belli's son Giuseppe a job in his workshop. All these connections aided the series' commission by Lotto. Giuseppe Belli would aid Lotto even in the realization of his later works.

The commission itself was undocumented, but the preliminary carpentry works for the altarpiece's wooden structure began in 1518. In 1521, the cornice gilding was commissioned by Pietro de Maffeis di Zogno, who completed work for la Pasqua in the previous year. These details help confirm the dating of the polyptych series, with its slightly antiquated form for the time, owing to the explicit request of its patrons.

The exact end date of Lotto's work is still unknown. A credible hypothesis is that the artist, finishing at Bergamo in 1526, entered contact with the Scuolo del Corpo di Cristo, perhaps by furnishing other panel paintings. The years following the realization of the series, Lotto was engaged in other citizens' commissions (like the Suardi Chapel in 1524) and the realization of the drawings for the Bergamo inlays and then left for Venice in 1527. Perhaps only in Venice, Lotto, inactive due to the hostility of the city's official culture, completed the work and shipped the last plans for the work.

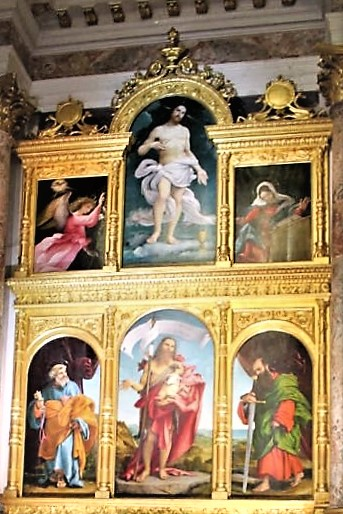
The series in its new engaged frame

For a long time, it was thought that the upper part of the altarpiece was made after the rest of it, but there is no documentation to confirm that the altarpiece was ever missing an upper part, that would need to be replaced. The original engaged, architectural frame was lost at some point The replacement was made by Giacomo Manzoni from a design by Virginio Muzio in 1902. The dimensions slightly differed and this did not permit the paintings to perfectly connect, as in the original realization by Lotto. The central panel where Saint John the Baptist is depicted was surely lower, eliminating part of the stone on which the feet of the saint are placed—the background landscape does not match the paintings on the side.

== Description and style ==
The series is composed of six compartments, three above and three below, in a similar setting to Titian's Averoldi Polyptych. In the first row, there are the following panels:

- Saint Peter, 118 x 57 cm
- Saint John the Baptist, 135 x 70 cm
- Saint Paul, 118 x 57 cm

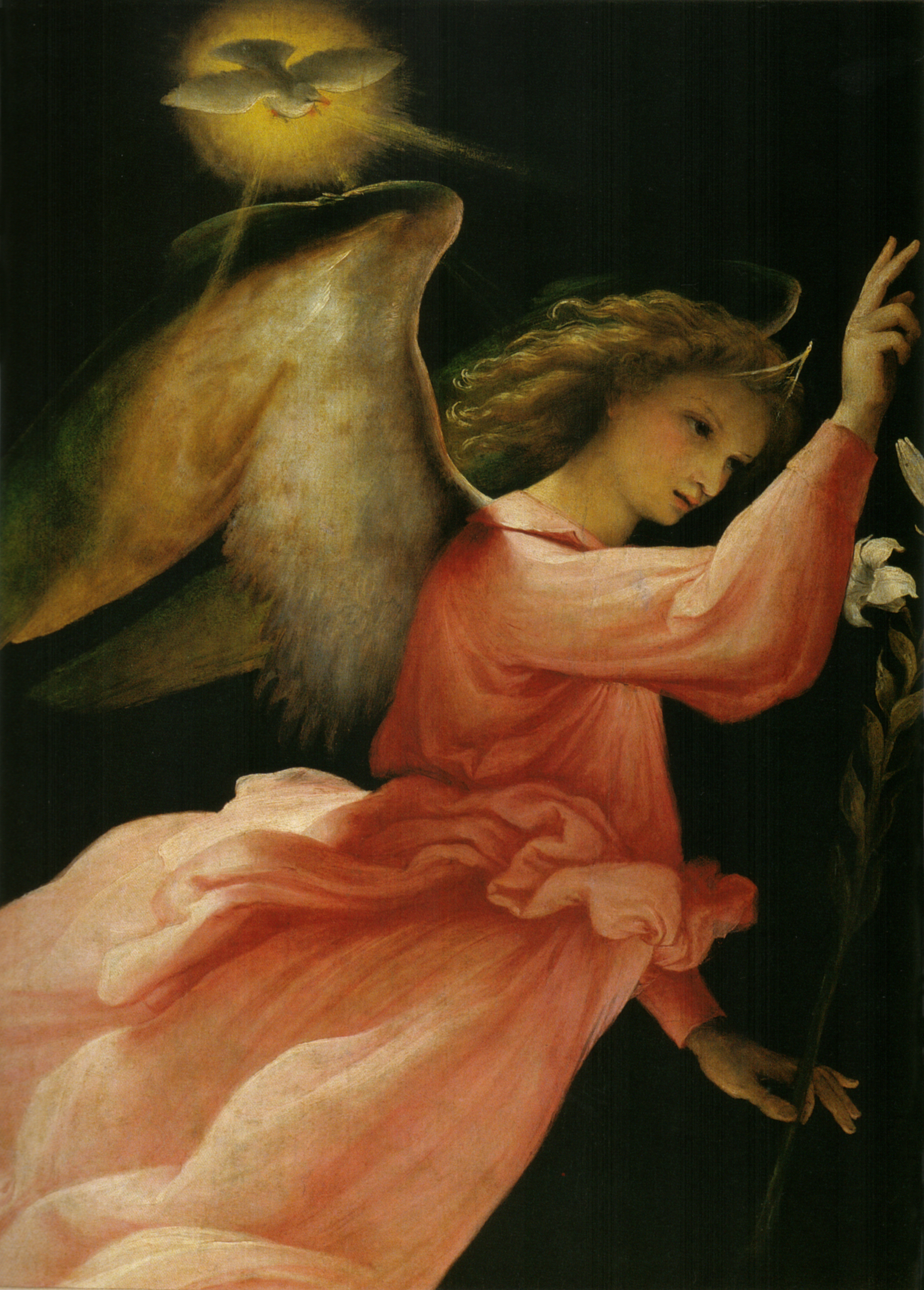
Detail of The Angel from the series

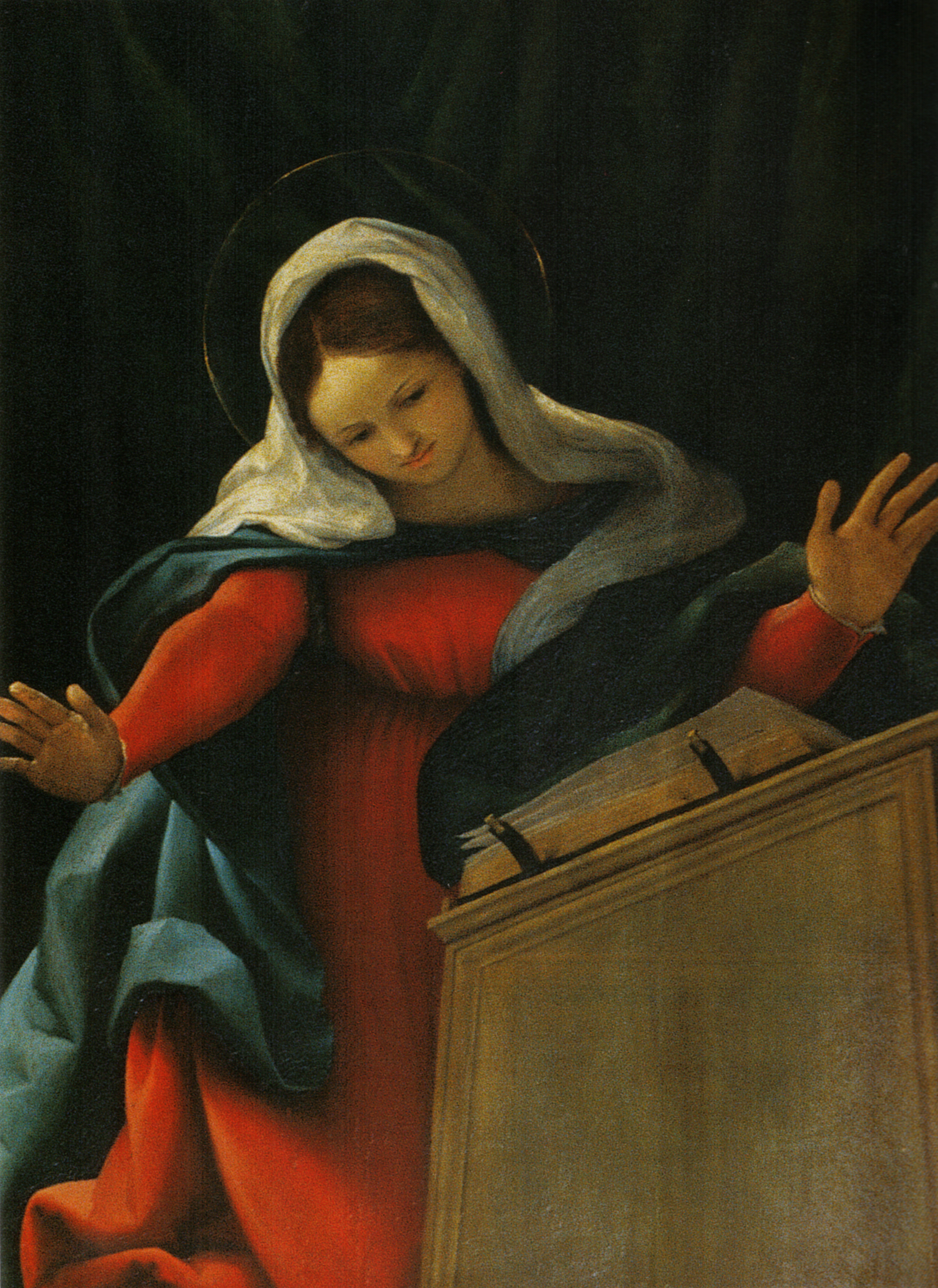
Detail of The Virgin from the series

In the row above:

- Angel of the Annunciation, 75 x 35 cm
- Christ the Redeemer, 135 x 70 cm
- Virgin of the Annunciation, 75 x 35 cm

John the Baptist is in the center of the lower row, with two visible cartouched texts that identify him: "Ego Vox clamantis in deserto/ Parate Viam Domini" and "Ecce Agnus Dei". The rock he is placed on presents the dating and signature of Lotto: "L. Lotus / 1522". The last digit of the date ends in a crack in the panel, which caused for a long time uncertainty about the dating of the work. The series' restoration in 2011 by the Fondazione Creberg revealed the last digit of "2". Saint John holds, in his arms, the lamb of God and extends his right hand towards St. Peter placed in the painting on his right.

The side panels are joined spatially, with the same landscape and two curtains that open at their sides. The original cornicing, now lost, would have added to these perspectival effects. The heavy velvet of the curtains reflects the influences of the Brescian Renaissance painting, particularly Girolamo Savoldo.

The central panel in the upper row explicitly refers to the devotion of the series' patrons, the Scuola di Corpo di Cristo. Christ stands on a cloud and wears a vaporous, white loincloth, and the blood from his wounds pours into a chalice of the Eucharist. The physical type of Christ is similar to Christ in Lotto's Suardi Chapel. The Scuola di Corpo di Cristo that commissioned the series wished to represent the body of Christ as a means of redemption—Lotto had shown Christ as risen, where his cross is only a luminous sign placed on his head. Later representations of Christ with sores, the tools of his martyrdom, and his blood pouring into a chalice were made by Giovanni Bellini in 1460 and Vittore Carpaccio in 1496.

The side panels in the upper row represent the Annunciation, divided into two and foreshortened for being viewed from below. On a dark background, the angel and the Virgin are silhouetted by light emitted by the dove of the Holy Spirit.

The polyptych series ends with a predella that includes five panels that represent Christ risen, Christ in limbo between two angels, and the appearance of Christ to his disciples. They were once attributed to Lotto until 1895, when they were re-attributed to Giovanni Cariani. The predella was joined to the polyptych only in 1816, when it was made part of a tabernacles. Both Lotto and Cariani had worked in Bergamo at the same time, but performed very different works.

== Bibliography ==
- Pirovano, Carlo (2002). Lotto (in Italian). Milano: Electa. ISBN 88-435-7550-3.
- Zanchi, Mauro (2011). Lotto : i simboli (in Italian). Firenze: Giunti. ISBN 978-88-09-76478-1.
- D'Adda, Roberta (2004). Lotto (in Italian). Milan: Skira.
