= Giovan Francesco Capoferri =

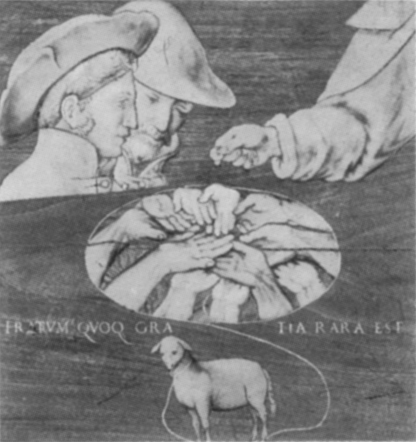
- Self-portraits of Capoferri and Lorenzo Lotto
- Born: 1487; Bergamo, Lombardy, Republic of Venice
- Died: 1534 (aged 46–47)
- Education: Damiano da Bergamo
- Known for: Intarsia
- Notable work: The drowning of the Pharaoh (1529–30) Judith and Holofernes (1527–30); The death of Abel (1524); Noah's Ark (1525); The jealousy of Noah (1524) Jonah (1528–30)
- Movement: Renaissance

Giovan Francesco Capoferri (1487–1534) was an intarsia artist in Bergamo, Lombardy (at the time a city of the Republic of Venice).

He was schooled by Damiano da Bergamo, working on the intarsia in the choir of Santi Bartolomeo e Stefano, Bergamo during the 1510s.

In the 1520s, Capoferri worked based on designs by the painter Lorenzo Lotto, notably working on the wooden inlays in the choir of Sta. Maria Maggiore, in Bergamo.

Notable works:

- The drowning of the Pharaoh (1529–30)
- Judith and Holofernes (1527–30)
- The death of Abel (1524)
- Noah's Ark (1525)
- The jealousy of Noah (1524)
- Jonah (1528–30)
