= Johannes Nicolaus Furichius =

Franco-German Neo-Latin poet, pharmacist and alchemist

- Born: 1602; Strasbourg, Alsace
- Died: 14 October 1633 (aged 31); Strasbourg, Alsace
- Education: University of Padua, University of Strasbourg
- Occupations: Neo-Latin poet, doctor of medicine, pharmacist, alchemist
- Writing career
- Language: Latin
- Notable work: Chryseidos Libri IIII (1631)

Johannes Nicolaus Furichius (1602–1633) was a German Neo-Latin Imperial poet laureate, pharmacist, doctor of medicine and alchemist from Strasbourg.

== Life and Works ==
Born 1602 to French Huguenot parents in Strasbourg Furichius only learned German while already attending the Protestant gymnasium at which he was a school-mate of Johann Michael Moscherosch (1601–1669). Both poets would henceforth cultivate an exchange of dedicatory and occasional epigrams. 1622 Furichius obtained the degree of magister artium together with that of an Imperial poeta laureatus and commenced studying medicine. In the same year he published his first anthology Libelli Carminum Tres which was ensued by the Poemata Miscellanea. Lyrica, Epigrammata, Satyrae, Eclogae, Alia in 1624, both books did not yet contain alchemical poetry but - like Moscherosch's early works - display both the city's intellectual life and the gymnasium's and the early University of Strasbourg's curricula: from portrays of professors and fellow students, valedictions and congratulations over mere formal jesting, satires and confessional polemics to historical and philosophical miniatures and theological exhortations.

Sojourning in Switzerland and Brixen between 1624 and 1626 Furichius travelled to the Venetian Republic where he inscribed at the medical faculty of the Padovan Universitas Artistarum and the corporation of the transalpine students, the German Natio Artistarum. Furichius' increasing interest in alchemical speculations and natural philosophy resulted in his first alchemical poem Golden Chain or Poetical Hermes of the Philosophers' Stone — Aurea Catena siue Hermes poeticus de Lapide Philosophorum (printed in 1627); an aemulatio of Giovanni Aurelio Augurelli's Chrysopoeia (Venice 1515). 1628 he returned to Strasbourg. Having defended his doctoral thesis in medicine and started to practice he married the daughter of the established goldsmith Josias Barbette (master craftsman in 1605), with whom he had five children, three of them died until 1633. In those years Furichius experimented with pharmaceutic alchemy and - although frowned upon by the local Protestant orthodoxy - established bonds to the Rosicrucian movement, namely to the Hamburgian Rosicrucian, obsessed bibliophile and keen traveller Joachim Morsius (1593–1643). Throughout their correspondence and when they met in Strasbourg during the winter of 1631/32 Morsius insisted on Furichius expanding the Aurea Catena to a great alchemical scientific poem which was published in 1631 as the Four Books of Chryseis — Chryseidos Libri IIII. At the age of 31 Furichius fell victim to the plague, which took a particularly grim toll from the Strasbourgian doctors, on 14 October 1633.

== The Chryseidos Libri IIII of 1631 ==
The Chryseidos Libri IIII consists of approximately 1.600 hexametric verses, divided into four books, to which Furichius added his own glosses and wrote a versatile author's commentary, i. e. appendixed Scholia - which were all printed within the 1631-edition. As Augurelli did one hundred years earlier Furichius depicts the alchemical work in sequences of mythological allegories: the Gods acting as metals, the Greek and Roman myths being euhemeristically interpreted as hidden alchemical instructions and vestiges of antediluvian lore. Yet while Augurelli's work is structurally clinging to Virgil's five books of the Georgics and is kept in an instructive style, Furichius opts for the form of a fantasmagorical travelogue in verse which he seeks to interlink with most scientific and literary discourses of his time.

=== Structure ===
The first book provides an introductory alchemical cosmology and narrates how the metals grow inside the earth and strife for perfection. Book two then introduces the first-person narrator Chrysanthus who recounts his adventures in a fantastical Libyan desert where he encounters a speaking raven, a dreadful dragon, is infested with divine visions and finally meets Hermes Trismegistos, who serves as hermit high priest of an alchemitised Proserpina (figuring as the eponymous Chryseis). The sage who is living on a mountain summit by the goddess' temple is in books three and four expounding that all the mysteries represented the alchemical work. Thus further myths are told until finally Chrysanthus is prepared to enter himself the sanctum of Chryseis.

=== Influences and interrelations ===
Albeit depending on Augurelli, Lucretius' De rerum natura and - as Furichius points out - on Manilius' Astronomica and Claudian's De raptu Proserpinae some passages are Latin adaptions of Pierre de Ronsard's (1524–1585) Hymne de l'Or while central alchemical parts of the Chryseis are versifications of the Tractatus aureus de lapidis physici secreto (an at first 1610 published commentary on supposed sayings of Hermes Trismegistos) which also served as one main source of Michael Maier's (1568/69-1622) emblem book Atalanta Fugiens. In his additions Furichius furthermore stresses his inspiration by Ludovico Ariosto's (1474–1533) Orlando Furioso and - apart from many genuinely alchemical references, even to Byzantine sources, and hommages to George Ripley (ca. 1450–1490) and Michael Sendivogius' (1566–1636) satires - indulges in the contemporary controversies of natural philosophy. Such he not only relates to, among scores of other authorities, the toxicology of the Padovan physician and botanist Prospero Alpini (1553–1616), and polymathic writings of the humanists (father) Julius Caesar Scaliger (1484–1558) and (son) Joseph Justus Scaliger (1540–1609) but also discusses Paracelsism and its antagonists.

== Works by Furichius ==
- Libelli Carminum Tres. Quarum Primum Epigrammata; Altera Anagrammata; Tertius Carmina ad Vitam Pertinentia continet. Strasbourg 1622.
- Poemata Miscellanea. Lyrica, Epigrammata, Satyrae, Eclogae, Alia. Strasbourg 1624.
- Aurea Catena siue Hermes poeticus de Lapide Philosophorum. Padua 1627.
- Disceptatio de Phrenetide. Strasbourg 1628 (doctoral thesis).
- Chryseidos Libri IIII. Sive poëma de Lapide Philosophorum. Adjunctis poematibus nonnullis aliis. Strasbourg 1631 — modern edition Tübingen 2011.
