= Cristoforo Canozzi =

Italian painter

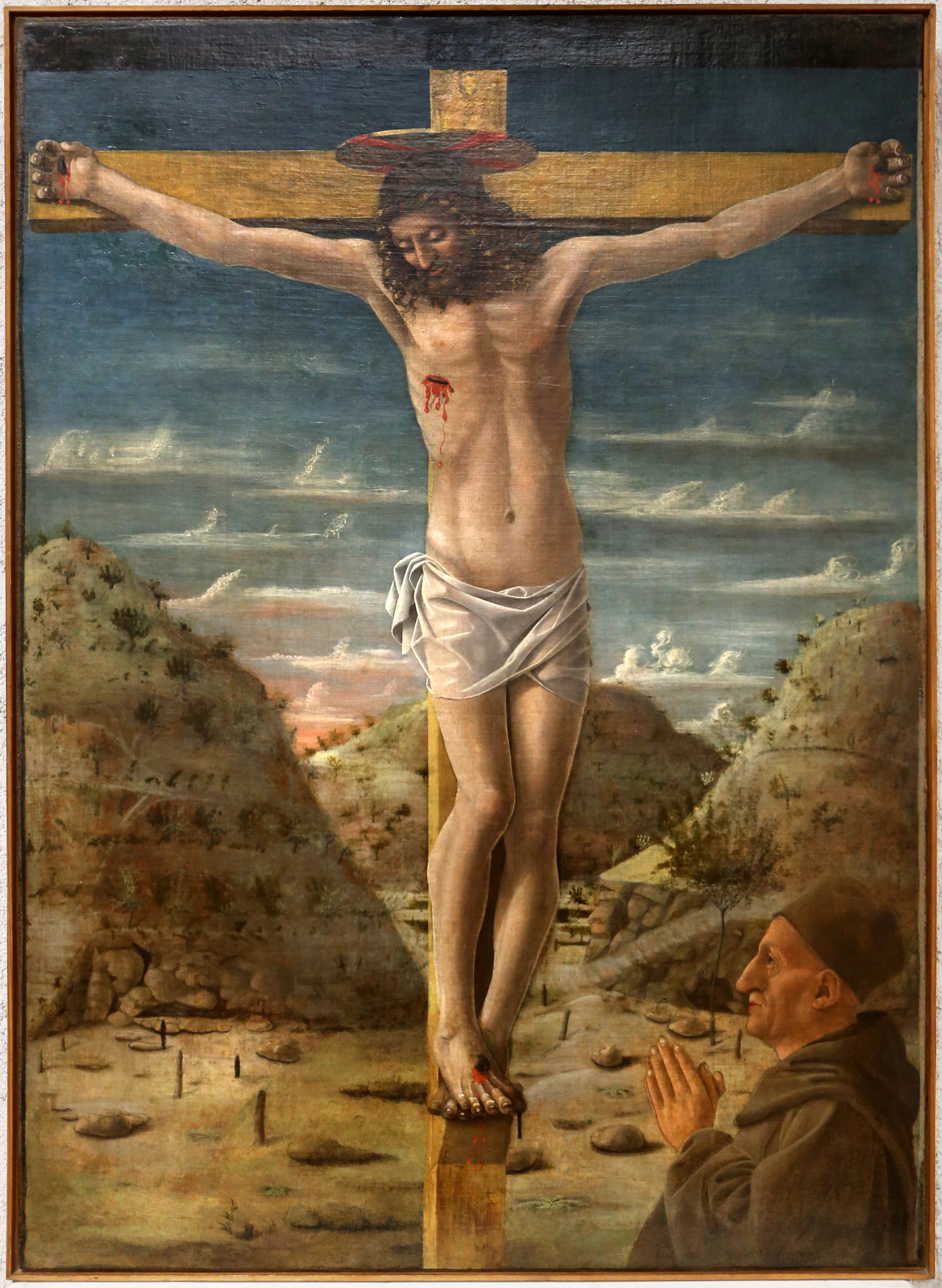

Cristoforo Canozzi, also called Cristoforo da Lendinara, (c. 1426 – after 1477) was an Italian painter of the Renaissance. He was born in Lendinara. Both he and his older brother Lorenzo Canozzi were painters, mosaicists, modellers in terra-cotta, wood-carvers, and printers of books. They flourished at Modena and Padua. He was the author of a Virgin and Child and a Crucifixion with SS. Jerome and Francis in the Gallery of Modena, (1482).
