= Lorenzo Canozzi =

Italian painter

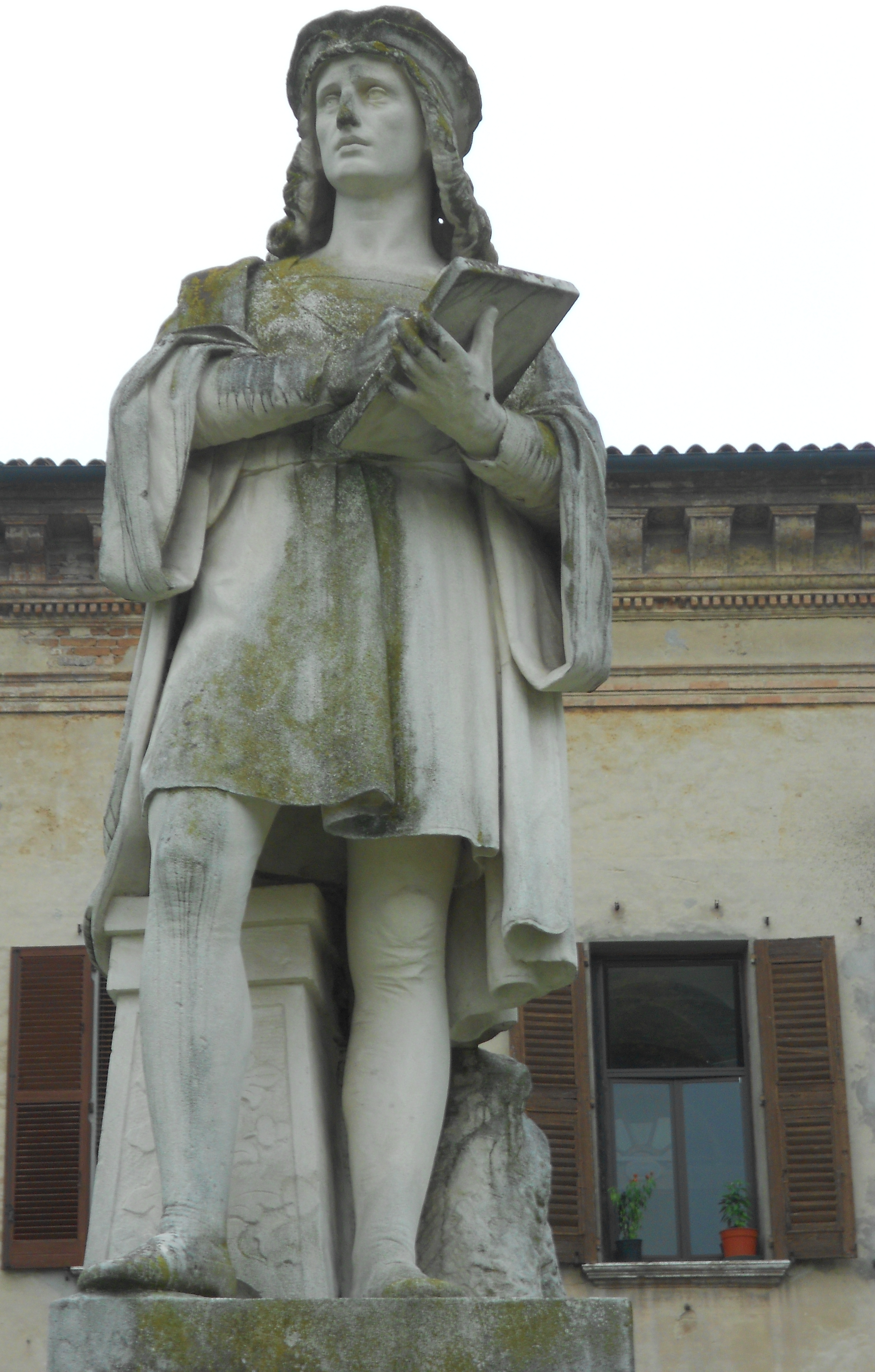
monument to Lorenzo Canozzi, Lendinara, Italy

Lorenzo Canozzi or Canozio (1425–1477), also called Lorenzo da Lendinara, was an Italian painter of the Renaissance.

== Biography ==
He was born in Lendinara in 1425. Both he and his younger brother Cristoforo Canozzi were painters, mosaicists, modellers in terra-cotta, wood-carvers, and printers of books. They flourished at Modena and Padua. Between 1460 and 1470 these brothers finished the carving and inlaying of ninety stalls in the choir of the Basilica of Saint Anthony of Padua; and in 1465 they executed the stalls in the choir of the cathedral of Modena. The first mentioned, with four exceptions, all perished by fire in 1749. At Modena four of the panels representing the Doctors of the Church, still remain. Between 1472 and 1476 the two brothers executed the mosaics of the presses in the sacristy of the Basilica in Padua, from designs by Francesco Squarcione, of whom Lorenzo at least was a pupil; these have been much damaged by restorations. Lorenzo is also thought to have painted the frescoes of SS. Jerome, Ambrose, Gregory, and Augustine in the Church of the Eremitani at Padua. His death occurred in 1477, and after that the business was carried on by Cristoforo. A Madonna and Child in the Modena Gallery bears his name, and the date 1482.

His son, Giovanni Marco Canozzi, completed the choir stalls of the Zoccolanti in San Francesco della Vigna in Venice.
