= Pecino da Nova =

Italian painter

Pacino or Pecino da Nova (late 14th century) was an Italian painter active in a late Gothic art style around Bergamo.

His father Alberto was also a painter. Few works can be attributed to him with any certainty, including works for the Duomo of Bergamo, the Basilica of Santa Maria Maggiore of Bergamo, and some frescoes for the Oratory of Santa Maria di Mocchirolo in Brianza now in the Brera Academy. Pecino da Nova (a smal town few kms north from Milan) was one of the finest lombard fresco painter in the second half of XIV century. Few works remain, but plenty of documents prove his fame and how he was sought after.
