= Amedeo Benedetti =

Amedeo Benedetti may refer to:

- Amedeo Benedetti (writer) (1954–2017), Italian writer
- Amedeo Benedetti (footballer) (born 1991), Italian footballer
