= Giovanni Aurelio Augurello =

Giovanni Aurelio Augurello (Joannes Aurelius Augurellus) (1441–1524) was an Italian humanist scholar, poet and alchemist. Born at Rimini, he studied both laws in Rome, Florence and Padua where he also consorted with the leading scholars of his time. At Florence he befriended Marsilio Ficino (1433–1499) and Angelo Poliziano (1454–1494), later while teaching classics in Treviso joined Aldo Mantius' humanist circle in Venice. Apart from his academic and literary work he practically experimented in metallurgy and provided colour pigments for his friend the Hermetic painter Giulio Campagnola (born ca. 1480) He is best known for his 1515 allegorical poem on the making of gold, Chrysopoeia, which was dedicated to Pope Leo X; leading to the famous but forged anecdote that the Pope had rewarded Augurello with a beautiful but empty purse as an alchemist like him should on his own to be capable of replenishing it — he was actually bestowed with a sinecure at the cathedral of Treviso.

Augurello's other works include Carmina (1505), Geronticon liber, Iambici libri, and Sermonum libri.

== Bibliography ==
- Allegretti, Antonio: De la Transmutatione de metalli. Poema d’alchimia del XVI secolo. Mino Gabriele (ed.). Rome 1981.
- Dal Canton, Giuseppina: Giulio Campagnola 'pittore alchimista’ (I). Antichità viva 16/5 (1977), pp. 11–19.
- Eadem: Giulio Campagnola 'pittore alchimista’ (II). Ibid. 17/2 (1978), pp. 3–10.
- Haskell, Yasmin: Round and Round we go: The Alchemical 'Opus circulatorium’ of Giovanni Aurelio Augurelli. Bibliothèque d’Humanisme et Renaissance 59 (1997), pp. 585–606.
- Kühlmann, Wilhelm: Alchemie und späthumanistische Formkultur. Der Straßburger Dichter Johann Nicolaus Furichius (1602-1633), ein Freund Moscheroschs. Daphnis 13 (1984), pp. 101–135.
- Martels, Zweder von: The Chrysopoeia (1515) of Ioannes Aurelius Augurellus and the importance of alchemy around 1500. Studi umanistici piceni 13 (1993), pp. 121–130
- Idem: The Allegorical Meaning of the 'Chrysopoeia’ by Ioannes Aurelius Augurellus. Acta Conventus Neo-Latini Hafniensis. Proceedings of the Eight International Congress of Neo-Latin Studies. Copenhagen 12 August to 17 August 1991. Rhoda Schnur et al. (edd.). Birmingham-New York 1994, pp. 979–988.
- Idem: Augurello's 'Chrysopoeia' (1515) : a turning point in the literary tradition of alchemical texts. Early Science and Medicine 5, 2 (2000), pp. 178–195.
- Pavanello, Giuseppe: Un maestro del quattrocento. Giovanni Aurelio Augurello. Venice 1905.
- Reiser, Thomas: Mythologie und Alchemie in der Lehrepik des frühen 17. Jahrhunderts. Die 'Chryseidos libri IIII’ des Straßburger Dichterarztes Johannes Nicolaus Furichius (1602-1633). Tübingen 2011, pp. 51–58.
- Secret, François: 'Chrysopoeia’ et 'Vellus aureum’, Bibliothèque d’Humanisme et Renaissance 38 (1976), pp. 109–110.
- Weiss, Robert: Augurelli, Giovanni Aurelio. DBI 4 (1962), pp. 578-581.
