= Damiano da Bergamo =

Fra Damiano da Bergamo (Damiano di Antoniolo de Zambelli) (circa 1480–1549) was an Italian artist and Dominican friar, mainly known for his wood-engraving and intarsia completed in a Renaissance style. Along with Francesco Orlandini, and owing designs to Vignola, Damiano completed the wood panels for the chapel once found in the Château de la Bastie d'Urfé in France, now in Metropolitan Museum of New York. He also completed the wooden choir stalls for San Domenico in Bologna.

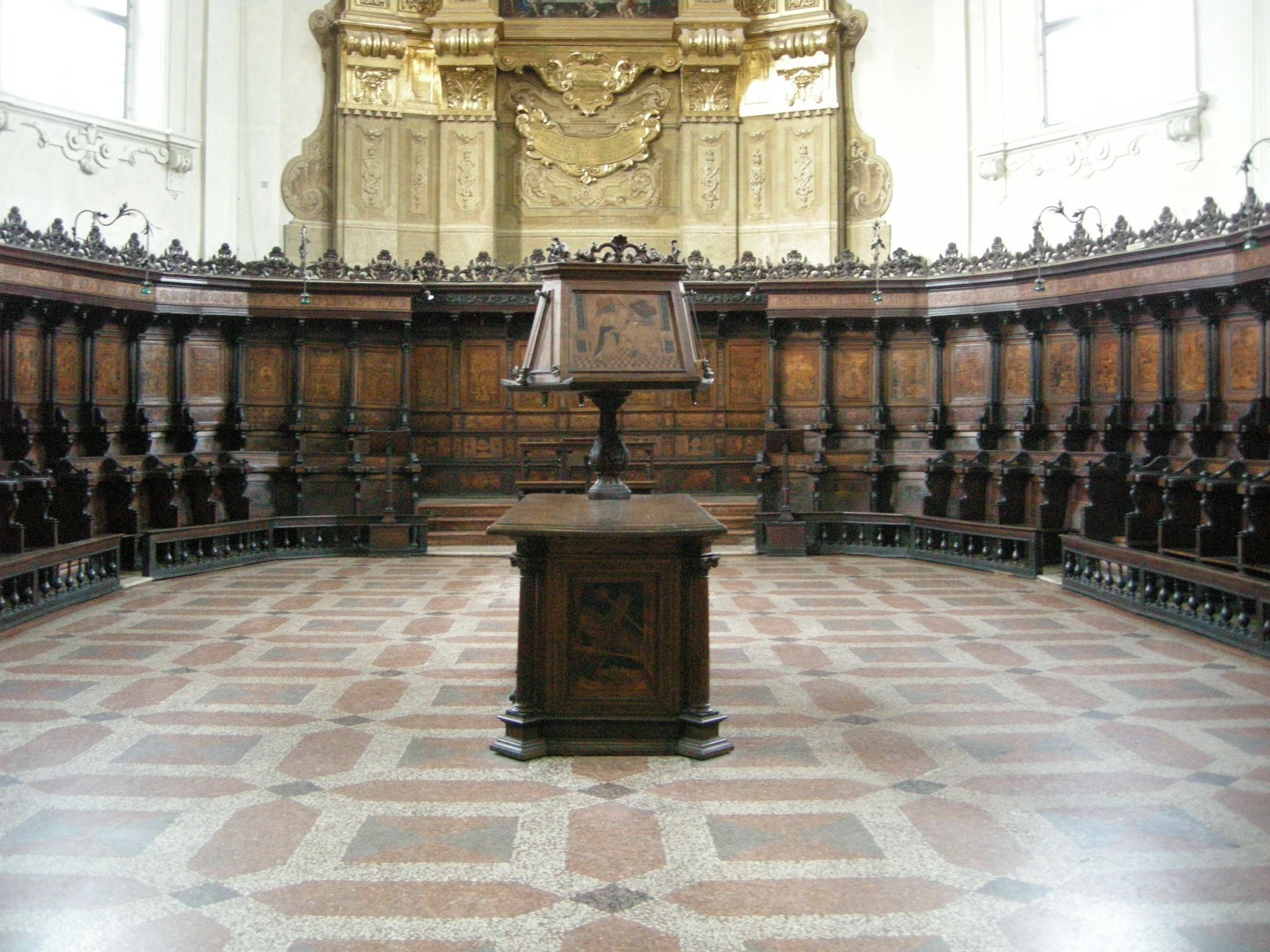
Choir stalls of San Domenico, Bologna

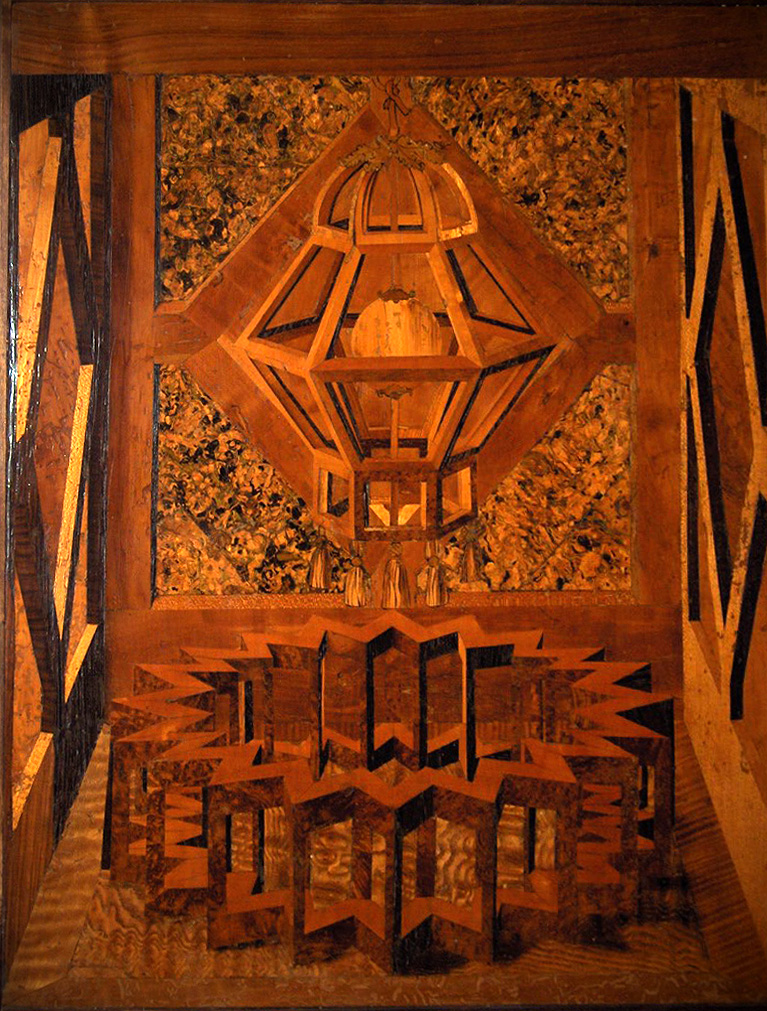
Geometric figure (1537), intarsia by fra Damiano da Bergamo; Museum of the Basilica of Saint Dominic, Bologna, Italy
