= Lochis Madonna =

Lochis Madonna may refer to:

- Lochis Madonna (Bellini)
- Lochis Madonna (Crivelli)
- Lochis Madonna (Titian)
