= Madonna and Child with an Apple =

Painting by Carlo Crivelli in the Victoria and Albert Museum

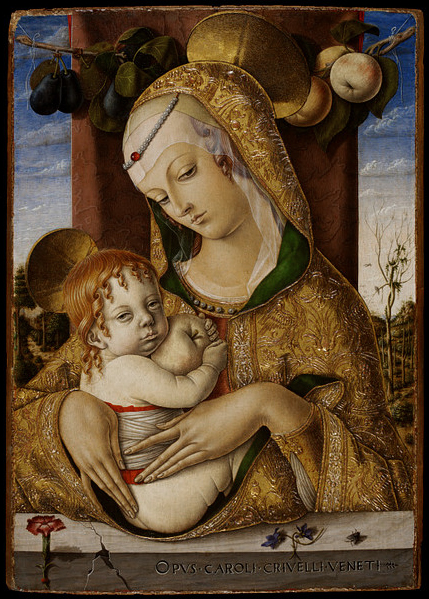
Madonna and Child with Apple (c. 1480) by Carlo Crivelli

Madonna and Child with an Apple or Madonna and Child Holding an Apple is a tempera and gold on panel painting by Carlo Crivelli, executed c. 1480, now in the Victoria and Albert Museum in London, having entered it as part of the Jones Bequest of 1882 - its previous provenance is unknown. It is signed OPVS CAROLI CRIVELLI VENETI.

Usually placed between the artist's Lenti Madonna and Ancona Madonna and Child in terms of dating, it was produced for private devotion. Several replicas are known - one each in a private collection in Venice (possibly seen by Testi in 1915), the one in the Eugen Bracht Collection in Berlin and later in the Hermann Eissler Collection in Vienna is now in New York (with variations; attributed to the Master of the Brera Predella by Drey in 1927), Museo della Ca' d'Oro in Venice (school of Crivelli with variations).
