= Madonna and Child with Saints (Palma Vecchio, Bergamo) =

Painting by Palma Vecchio

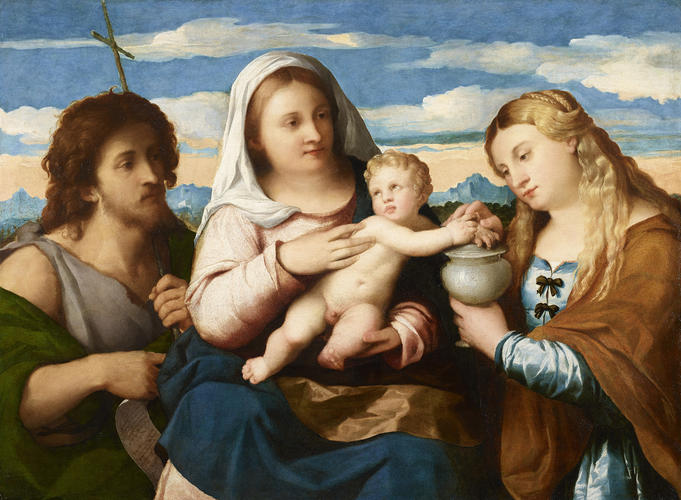
Madonna and Child with Saints (c. 1520)

Madonna and Child with Saints is a c. 1520 oil on panel painting by Palma Vecchio, now in room XVI of the Accademia Carrara in Bergamo, the artist's birthplace. It is first recorded as part of the collection of Guglielmo Lochis, who acquired it in 1830 from Cristoforo Orsetti, one of the most important Venetian collectors of that era.

To the left is John the Baptist and on the right Mary Magdalene with her traditional attribute of a jar of ointment. Two treatments of the subject survive, with the later one now in Genoa. It belongs to the sacra conversazione genre and shows Giovanni Bellini and Titian's influence on the artist.

== See also ==
- Madonna and Child with Saints (Palma Vecchio, Genoa)
