= Lochis Madonna (Crivelli) =

1475 painting by Carlo Crivelli

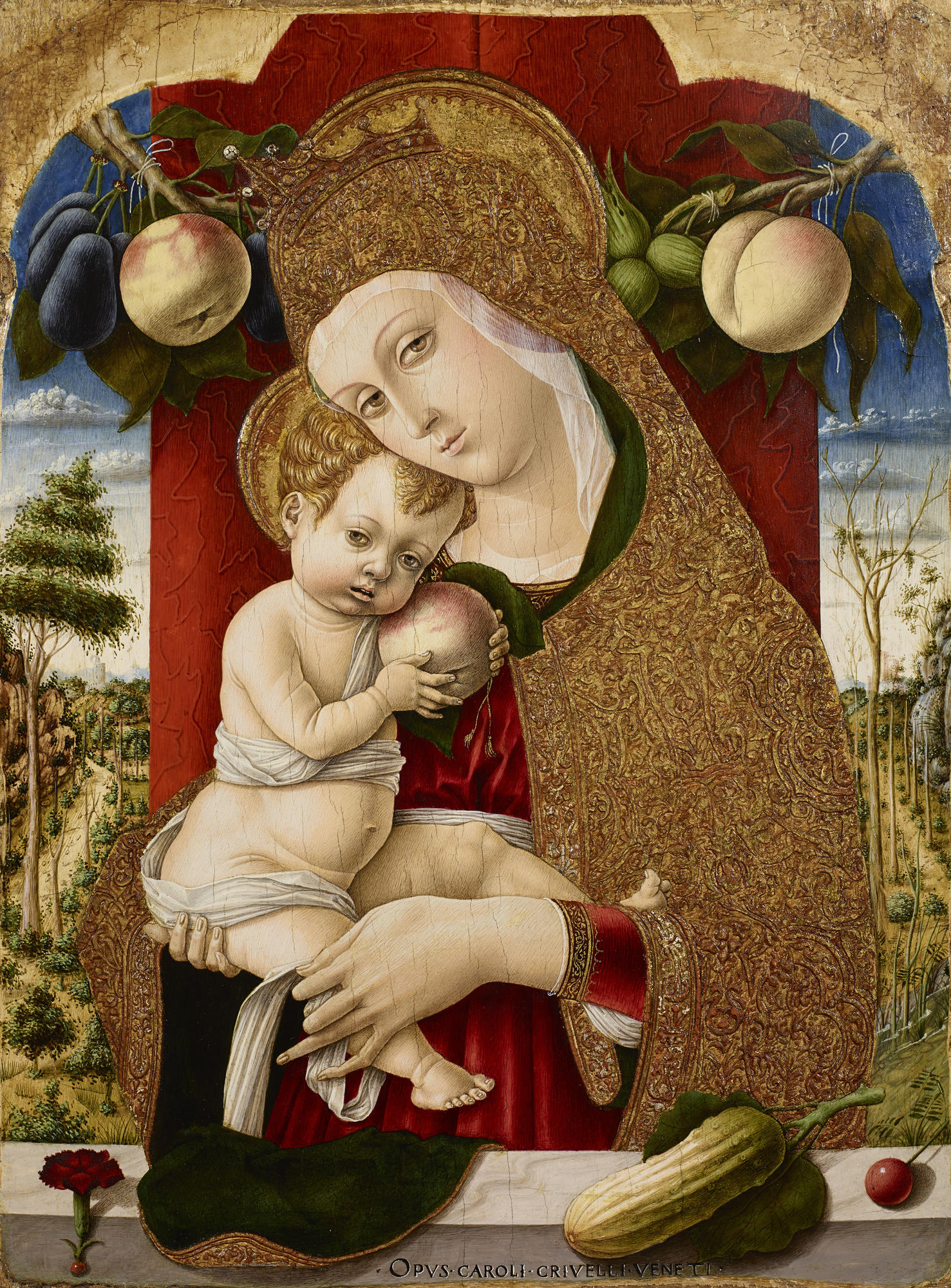
- Artist: Carlo Crivelli
- Year: c. 1475
- Medium: oil on panel
- Dimensions: 33 cm × 45 cm (13 in × 18 in)
- Location: Accademia Carrara, Bergamo

The Lochis Madonna is a tempera and gold on panel painting by the Italian Renaissance painter Carlo Crivelli, executed c. 1475, and signed OPVS CAROLI CRIVELLI VENETI. It is now in the Accademia Carrara, in Bergamo, which it entered in 1866 from Guglielmo Lochis' collection – its previous history is unknown.

== Description and analysis ==
Only 33 by 45 cm, the work was produced for private devotion just before the same artist's Ancona Madonna and Child and just after his Lenti Madonna. The composition with a garland is linked to the Paduan School, its use of space draws on Mantegna, the high level of detail shows Flemish influence and the use of gold fuses Gothic and Byzantine influence. The right hand background landscape is barer than that on the left, symbolising the death and life linked to Christ's sacrifice. The Christ Child holds an apple referring to original sin, the cucumber, cherry and peaches on the balustrade to Mary's fertility and virginity and the carnation at bottom left is a symbol of Christ’s Passion.
