= Sant'Agata, Brescia =

Church in Brescia, Italy

Coordinates: 45.5391°N 10.2186°E

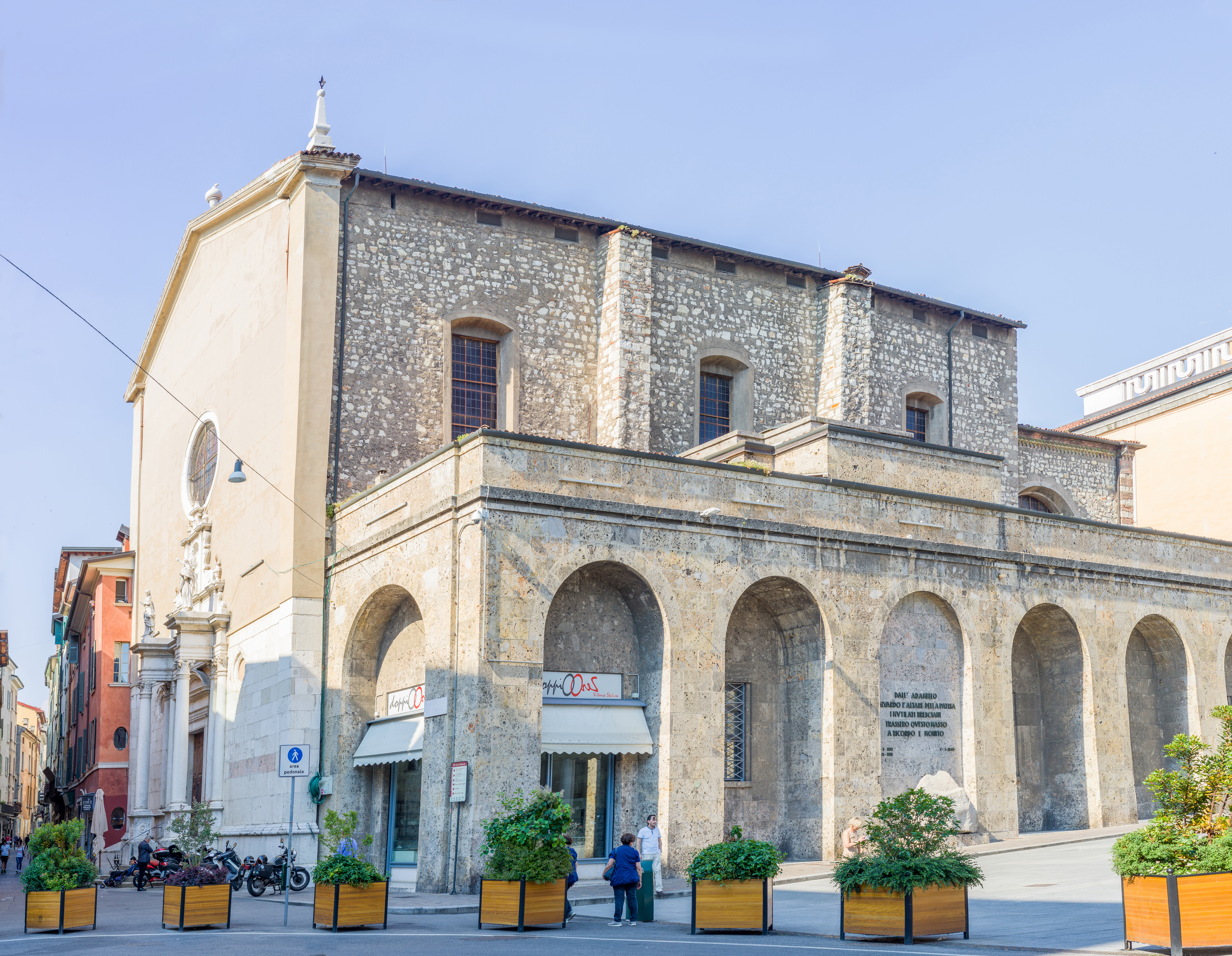
South facade of the church

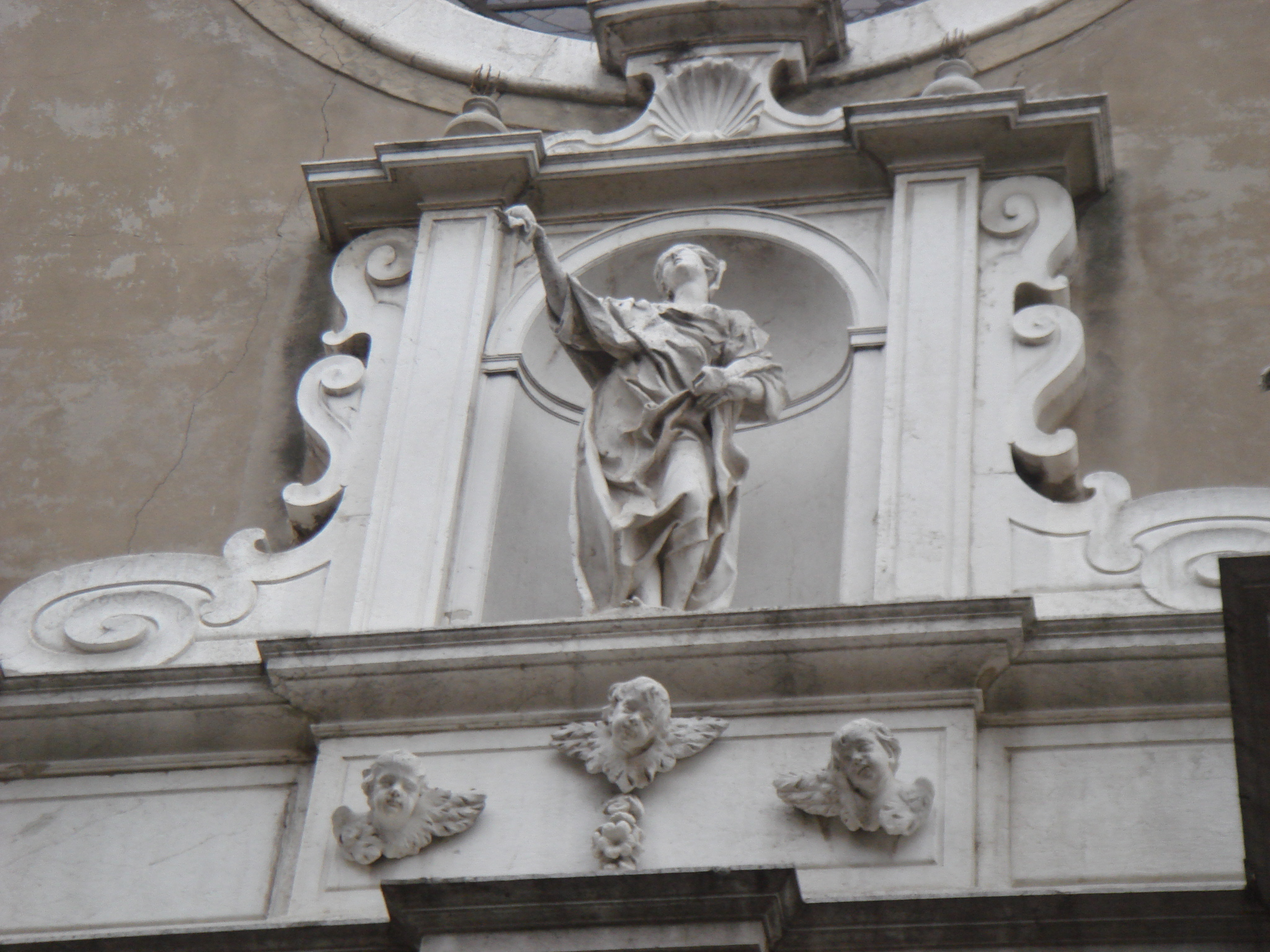
Statue of Sant'Agata above the entrance

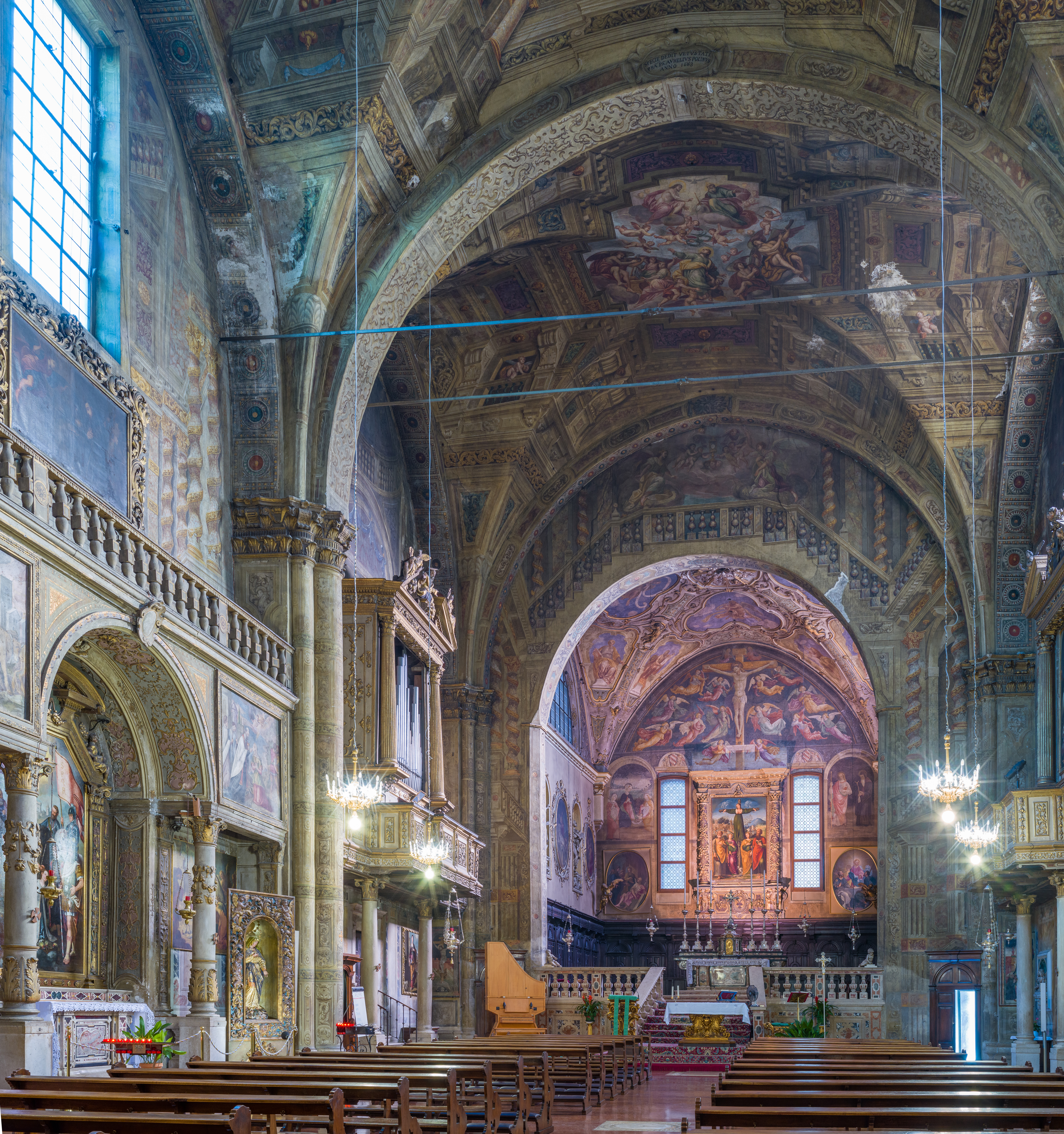
The interior

Sant'Agata is a 15th-century, Roman Catholic church located on Corsetto Sant'Agata at Piazza della Vittoria in Brescia, region of Lombardy, Italy.

== History ==
A church at the site was present by the 8th century, when the neighborhood was located outside the city walls, but after the 1184 fire destroyed the ancient church, it was reconstructed in the 15th-century in Gothic style. Destruction by fire of this church was somewhat paradoxical, since Saint Agatha was the saint invoked for protection against fires. Further modifications were completed along the centuries, leading to a pastiche of styles. The incomplete 14th-century facade has a Renaissance architecture facade, decorated with Baroque statuary. Inside, the presbytery dates from the 15th century, the ceiling from the 16th century, the altars and fresco decoration from the 1680s, and the chapel of the Santissimo Sacramento is from the 18th century. The main altarpiece depicting Sant'Agata with Saints Peter, Paul, Lucia, Apollonia standing before the cross (1522) is a masterwork by Francesco Prata from Caravaggio.
