= Lochis Madonna (Titian) =

Painting by Titian

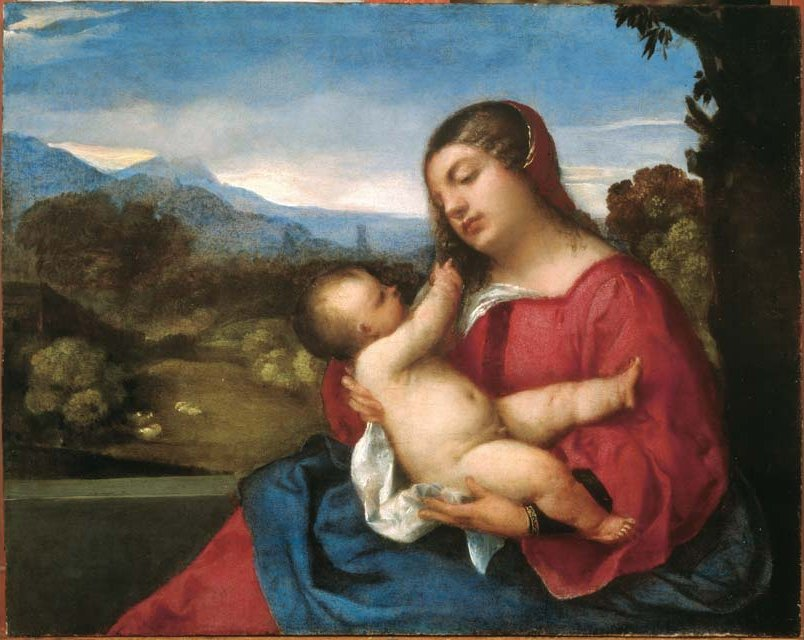
Lochis Madonna (c. 1508-1510) by Titian

The Lochis Madonna is an oil on panel painting attributed to Titian (it has previously been attributed to Francesco Vecellio and Santo Zago) and dated to around 1508–1510. It is now in the Accademia Carrara, in Bergamo. It is first recorded as part of the Lochis collection, after which it is named.

== See also ==
- List of works by Titian
