= Saint Peter Martyr Altarpiece =

Altarpiece by Carlo Crivelli

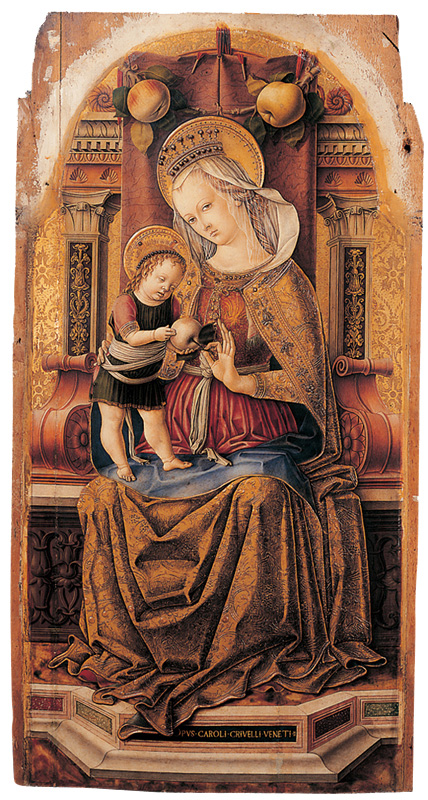
Saint Peter Martyr Altarpiece (c. 1476) central panel, by Carlo Crivelli

The St Peter Martyr Altarpiece or Minor San Domenico Altarpiece is an altarpiece in tempera and gold on panel by the Italian Renaissance painter Carlo Crivelli, executed c. 1476. Its central panel of the Madonna and Child, signed "OPVS CAROLI CRIVELLI VENETI", is now in the Museum of Fine Arts in Budapest. The altarpiece's other panels (Michael the Archangel, Saint Jerome, Saint Peter Martyr and Saint Lucy) were seen in Rome by Luigi Lanzi in 1789 before being moved to Florence with the Rinuccini family. In 1868 it moved from the Demidov collection to the National Gallery in London, where they still hang.

The four panels entered the National Gallery with a central panel. The four panels were topped by four semi-circles and a Neo-Gothic cusp above Mary. Above this register was a final one of four more full-length saints. In time the work was recognised as an arbitrary assembly of panels from different altarpieces.

Orsini and Lazzari mention an altarpiece produced in 1476 for the church of San Domenico in Ascoli Piceno – Dominican saints in the lower two registers of the Demidov polyptych confirm that they come from the so-called 1476 Altarpiece. Lazzari (1724) and Ricci (1834, on Bartoli's earliest testimony) also mention a second altarpiece by the artist in the same church, also dating to 1476, now known as the Saint Peter Martyr Altarpiece'. It is therefore theorised that the altarpieces were both dismantled during rebuilding of the church in 1776, then sold to the antiquarian Grossi who sold all the panels separately and grouped some of them into the altarpiece that Cardinal Zelada bought from him.

Federico Zeri and Rodolfo Pallucchini then joined the altarpieces together, initially referring to the first (the high altarpiece), the Pietà in the Metropolitan Museum, and then to the Madonna in the Museum of Fine Arts in Budapest, already in the Esterhazy collection. The altarpieces also had to have a predella each, now all lost. In 1961 the National Gallery dismantled the panels by reconstructing them into two separate altarpieces.

== Bibliography ==
- Andreas Quermann, Ghirlandaio, serie dei Maestri dell'arte italiana, Könemann, Köln 1998. ISBN 3-8290-4558-1
