= San Nicolò, Isola Dovarese =

Roman catholic church

Coordinates: 45°10′35″N 10°18′41″E

San Nicolò is a Neoclassical-style, Roman Catholic church located in the town of Isola Dovarese in the province of Cremona, region of Lombardy, Italy.

== History ==
A church raised on land protected from floods of the Oglio river, called Santa Maria in Insula (St Mary on the Island), was present by the 15th century, and the present layout is due to the 18th-century refurbishment. The church underwent further reconstruction in 1846. The church entrance is through a side door, once the main thoroughfare in town.

The interior has notable artworks. In the altar belonging to the Gonzaga family is an Ecce Homo (1575) painted by Bernardino Campi. An Annunciation, colloquially referred to as the Madonna del Gatto, was painted by Altobello Melone. A wooden statue of the Virgin is attributed to the sculptor Bertesi. The Organ is from the studio of Montesanti. A canvas in the apse depicting the Madonna in Glory between St Dominic and Pius V was painted by Camillo Procaccino; this painting was relocated here from a closed oratory.
