= Holy Family with Saint Catherine of Alexandria =

Painting by Lorenzo Lotto

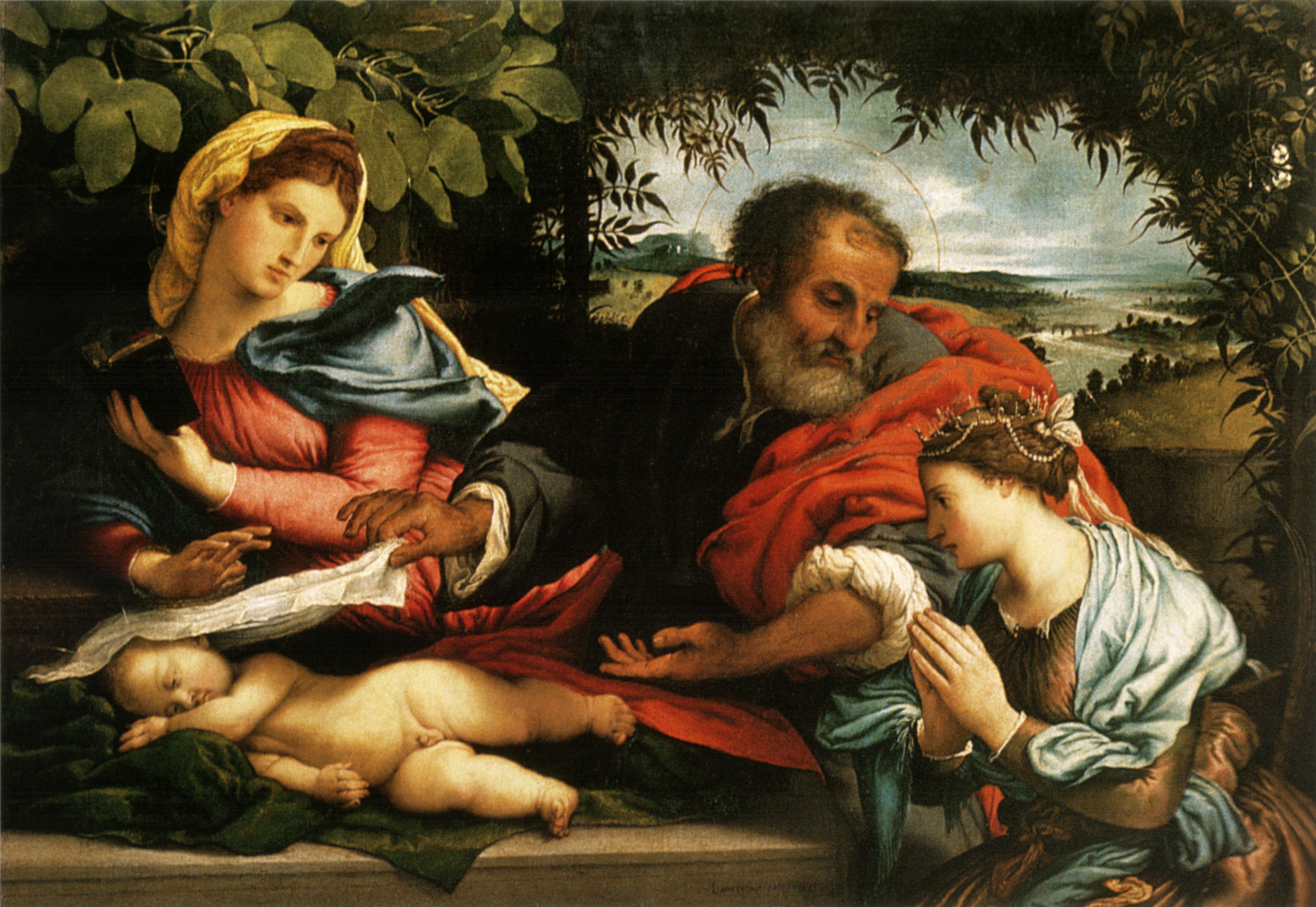
Holy Family with Saint Catherine of Alexandria (1533) by Lorenzo Lotto

Holy Family with Saint Catherine of Alexandria is a 1533 oil-on-canvas painting by the Italian Renaissance artist Lorenzo Lotto, now in the Accademia Carrara in Bergamo. It is signed and dated "Laurentius Lotus 1533" and it measures 85.7 cm in height and 110.8 cm in width. Six later copies after the work are known. The Bergamo version is judged to be of exceptional quality, and the earliest.

Lotto painted this in 1533, the year he abandoned Venice to settle in the Marche for seven years. Judging by its format, the painting was commissioned for a private chapel rather than as an altarpiece in a church. It was acquired in 1829 by count Guglielmo Lochis. It is difficult to identify an earlier provenance or patron due to the number of different versions of the painting.
