= Francesco Prata =

Italian painter

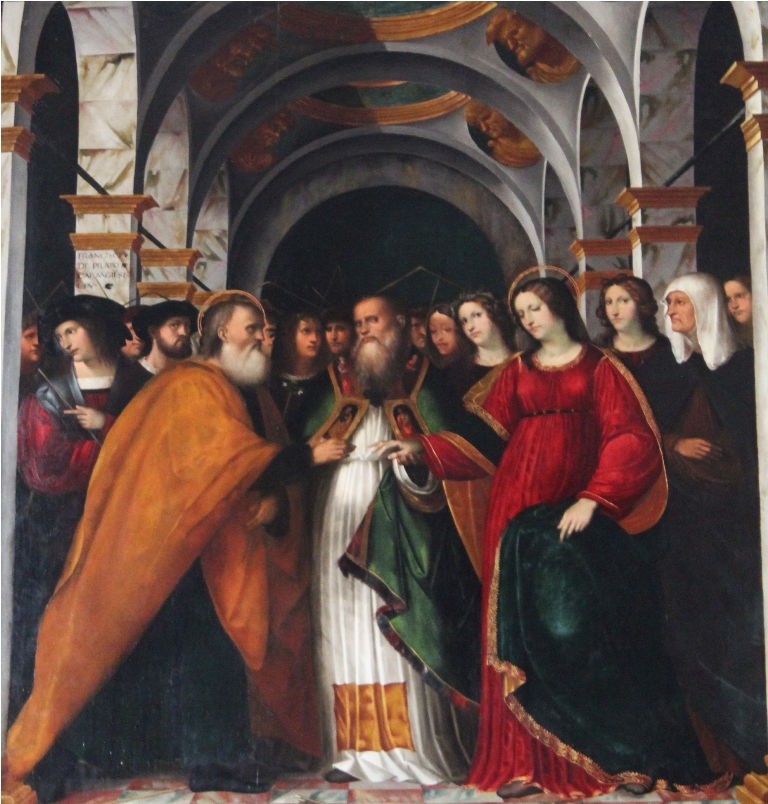
Sposalizio della Vergine

Francesco Prata was an Italian painter who worked in Brescia during the 16th century.

== Biography ==
Born in Caravaggio, Lombardy. He was influenced by Il Romanino and Altobello Melone. He painted the altarpiece of Saint Agatha crucified among St. Peter, St. Paul, St. Lucy and St. Apollonia (1522) in the church of Sant'Agata. He also painted a Marriage of the Virgin in the church of San Francesco. A portrait of Giovanni Battista Vannucci (or Vannini) from 1515 to 1518 is attributed to Prata.

Among his masterworks are frescoes decorating the dome of the Holy Sacrament Chapel in the church of Saints Fermo and Rustico, Caravaggio, Lombardy.
