= Guglielmo Lochis =

Politician

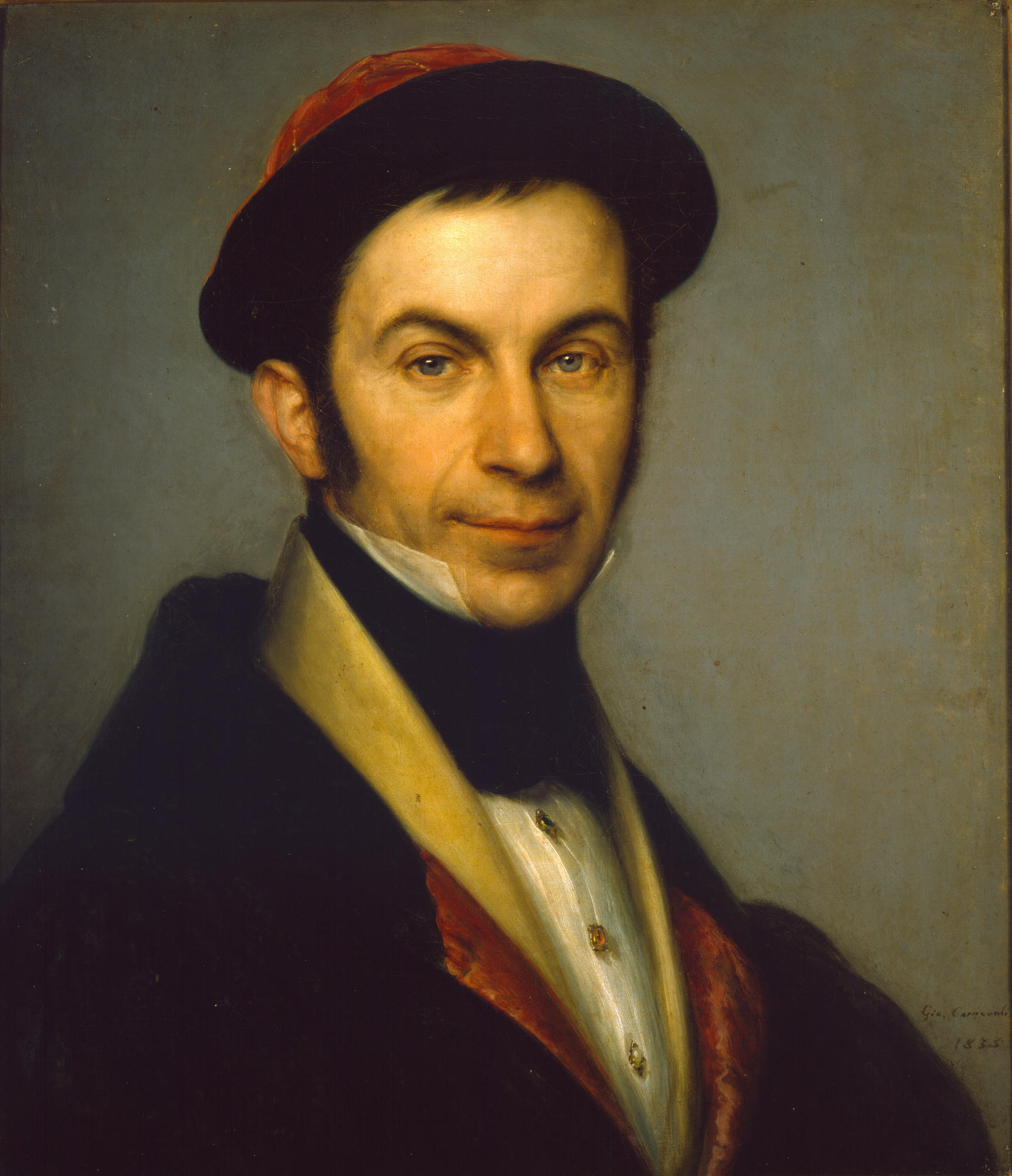
Lochis in 1835

Count Guglielmo Lochis (1789 – 25 July 1859) was an Italian nobleman, politician, art collector and art connoisseur.

Born in Mozzo into a family which had been active in Bergamo since the 16th century and which had held the title of count since the 18th century, he entered public life in 1816 as a member of the Lombard-Venetian guard during the visit to Bergamo of Francis II, Holy Roman Emperor. In 1835 Bergamo's Accademia Carrara made him its auction commissioner; he also served as the city's podestà from 1842 to 1848, with his resignation from the latter role triggered by the Revolutions of 1848. He died in Bergamo.

== Collection ==
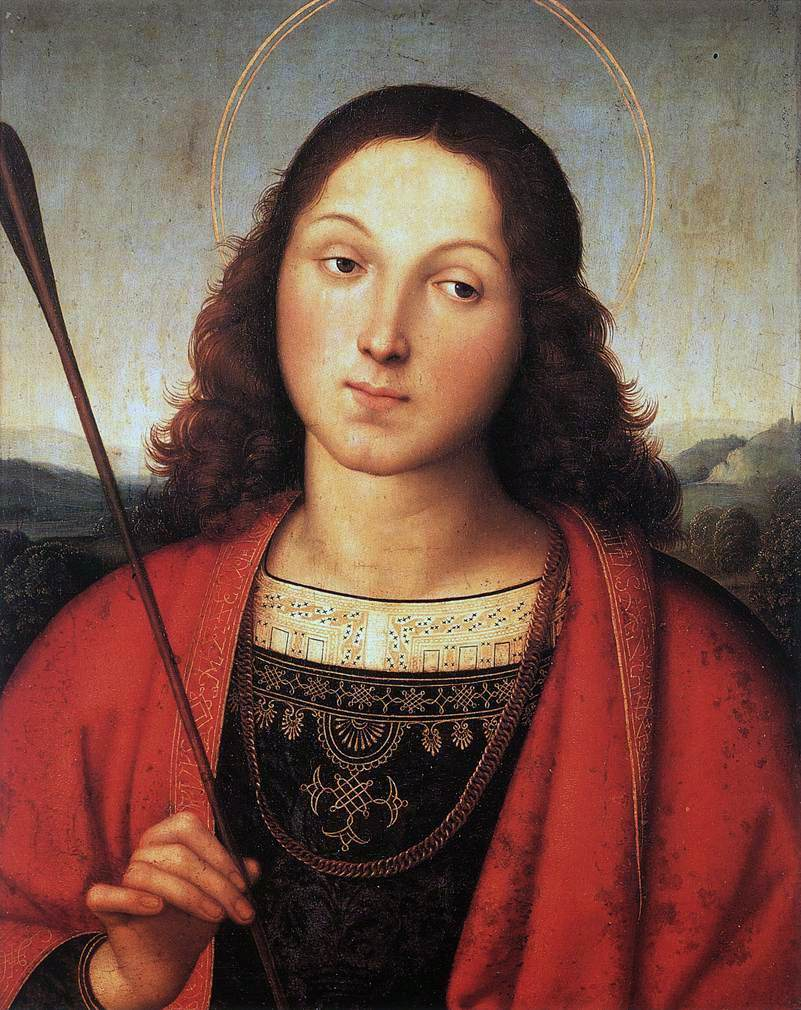
Raphael's Saint Sebastian – symbol of the Accademia Carrara

Lochis acquired several artworks in the 1820s, gathering a collection of around 500 works in Villa delle Crocette in Mozzo, which became a stop on the tourist-trail in the area. Two-thirds of the collection was left to the city as the Fondo Lochis on the stipulation that these works remain in the Villa, with the rest remaining with the family or sold off on the art market; the Portrait of a Scholar or Portrait of a Gentleman of the Albani Family by Giovanni Battista Moroni, for example, is now in a private collection in Berlin. The city found the will's condition hard to meet and so in 1866 renegotiated with Guglielmo's heir Carlo to allow the works to be hung in a room in the Accademia Carrara with the Lochis coat of arms over the door.

The works which went to the Accademia included:

- Madonna and Child by Jacopo Bellini
- Madonna and Child by Giovanni Bellini
- Pietà by Giovanni Bellini
- Madonna and Child with Saints by Palma Vecchio
- Madonna and Child by Carlo Crivelli
- Madonna and Child by Cosmè Tura
- Madonna del Latte by Ambrogio da Fossano
- Saint Ambrose Meeting the Emperor Theodosius by Ambrogio da Fossano
- Holy Family with Saint Catherine of Alexandria by Lorenzo Lotto
- Nativity of Mary with Saints James, Anthony Abbot, Andrew, Dominic, Lawrence and Nicholas of Bari by Vittore Carpaccio
- Portrait of a Gentleman by Altobello Melone
- Saint Sebastian by Raphael
- Holy Family with the Infant Saint John the Baptist by Moretto da Brescia
- The Crucified Christ with a Devotee by Moretto da Brescia
- Adoration of the Christ Child by Bernardino Luini
- Madonna and Child by Titian
- Orpheus and Eurydice by Titian
- Madonna and Child Triptych by Gerolamo Giovenone
- Saint Nicholas of Tolentino by Giovanni Battista Moroni
- Portrait of a Child of the Redetti Family by Giovanni Battista Moroni
- Saint Francis Receiving the Stigmata by El Greco
- Portrait of Ulisse Aldovrandi by Agostino Carracci
- Portrait of a Child by Diego Velázquez
- Madonna del Sassoferrato by Fra Galgario
- Portrait of Francesco Maria Bruntino by Fra Galgario
- The Grand Canal at Palazzo Balbi by Canaletto
- Saint Maximus and Saint Oswald by Giovan Battista Tiepolo
- View by Francesco Guardi
- Il ridotto by Pietro Longhi

== Bibliography ==
- (in Italian) Giovanni Lochis, La pinacoteca e la villa Lochis alla Crocetta di Mosso presso Bergamo, Arnaldo Forni editore, 1858.
- (in Italian) G. Brambilla, Guglielmo Lochis patrizio bergamasco e conoisseur europeo, Atti dell'Ateneo di Scienze Lettere ed Arti di Bergamo, 1995–6, pp. 393–410.
- (in Italian) G. Brambilla Ranise, Una vita, una collezione, un tradimento. Guglielmo Lochis (1789–1859) e la sua raccolta, Bergomum, 2005, p. 225–288.
