= Madonna and Child with Saints (Palma Vecchio, Genoa) =

Painting by Palma Vecchio

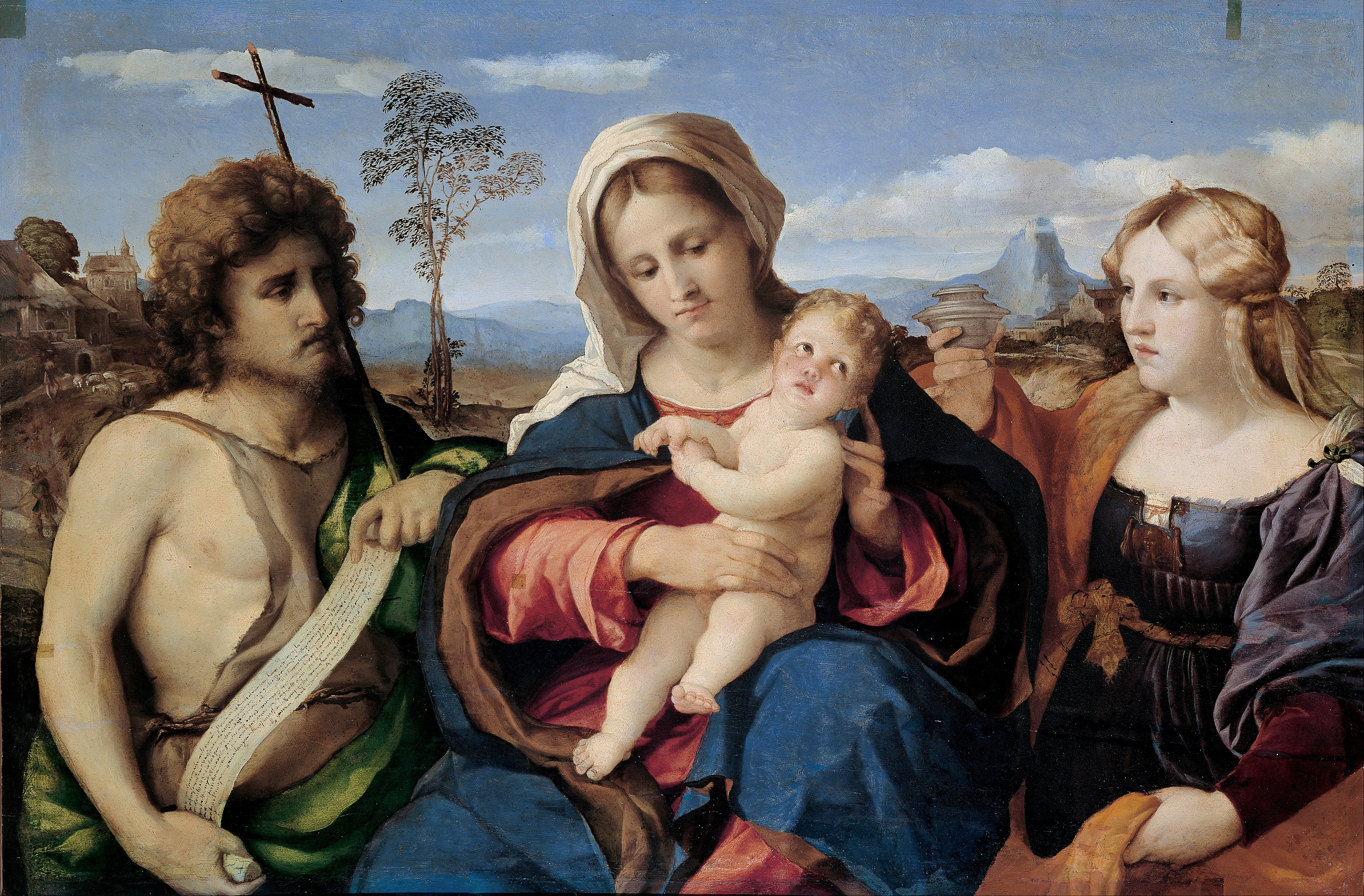
Madonna and Child with Saints (c. 1520–1522)

Madonna and Child with Saints is a c. 1520-1522 oil on panel painting by Palma Vecchio, now in the Palazzo Rosso in Genoa.

To the left is John the Baptist and on the right Mary Magdalene with her traditional attribute of a jar of ointment. Two treatments of the subject survive, with the slightly earlier one now in Bergamo. It belongs to the sacra conversazione genre and shows Giovanni Bellini and Titian's influence on the artist.

== See also ==
- Madonna and Child with Saints (Palma Vecchio, Bergamo)
