= Portrait of a Gentleman (Melone) =

1513 painting by Altobello Melone

Portrait of Gentleman
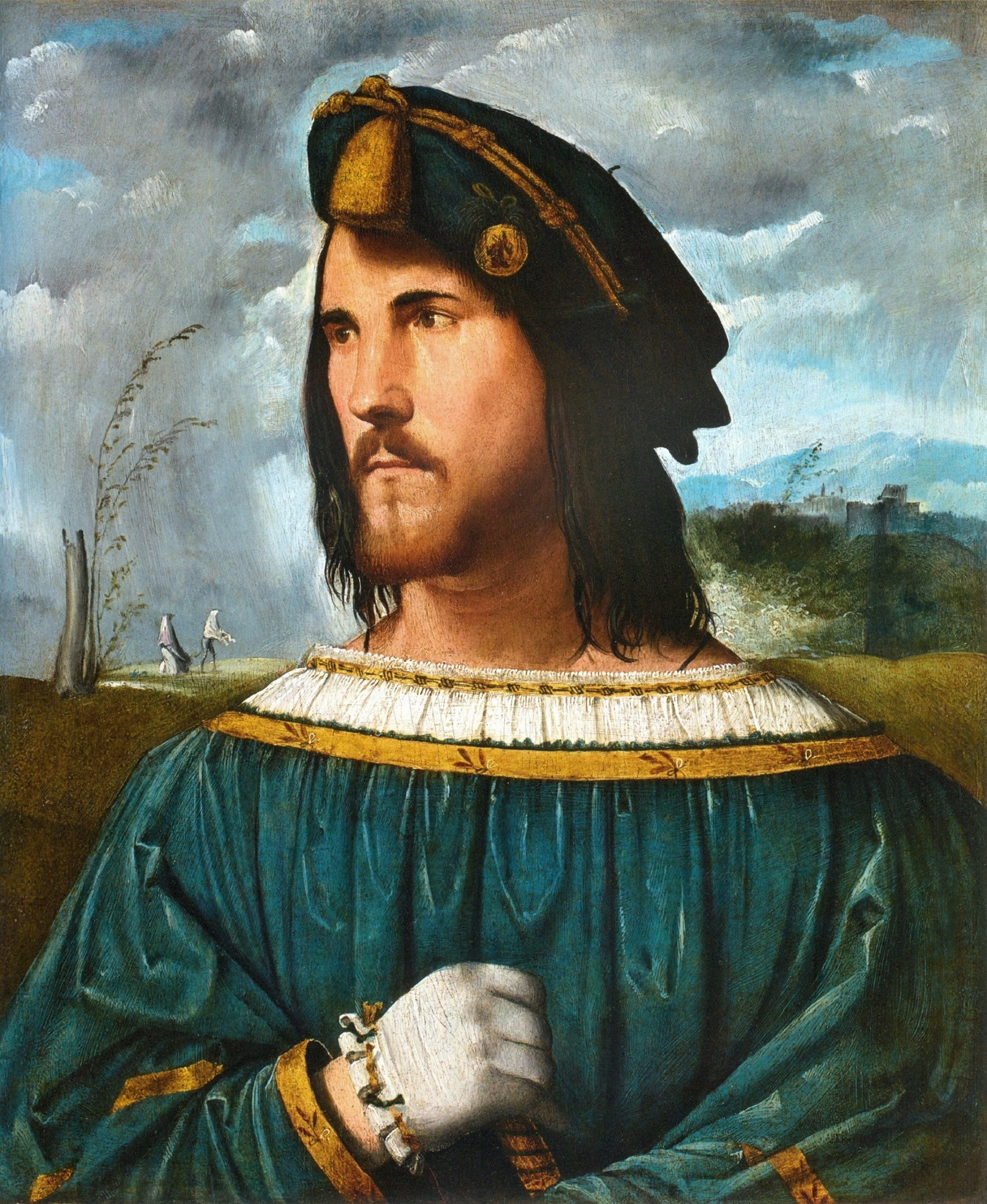
- Portrait of Cesare Borgia
- Artist: Altobello Melone
- Year: c. 1513
- Movement: Renaissance
- Dimensions: 58.1 cm × 48.2 cm (22.9 in × 19.0 in)
- Location: Accademia Carrara, Bergamo
- Owner: Guglielmo Lochis

Portrait of a Gentleman is a 1513 oil on wood panel by Altobello Melone. It is kept in the Accademia Carrara, Bergamo.

It is one of the most famous paintings from the collection of Count Guglielmo Lochis, where for it was thought to be a portrait of Cesare Borgia, son of Pope Alexander VI. The attribution to Altobello Melone was first made in 1871. It was confirmed in 1955 by Mina Gregori, who compared the portrait in eccentric style to Melone's The road to Emmaus.

Some three hundred years after the portrait was painted, the Borgia family ordered a copy from Pelagio Palagi, and the copy was discussed at some length by Antoine-Claude Pasquin.
