= Lenti Madonna =

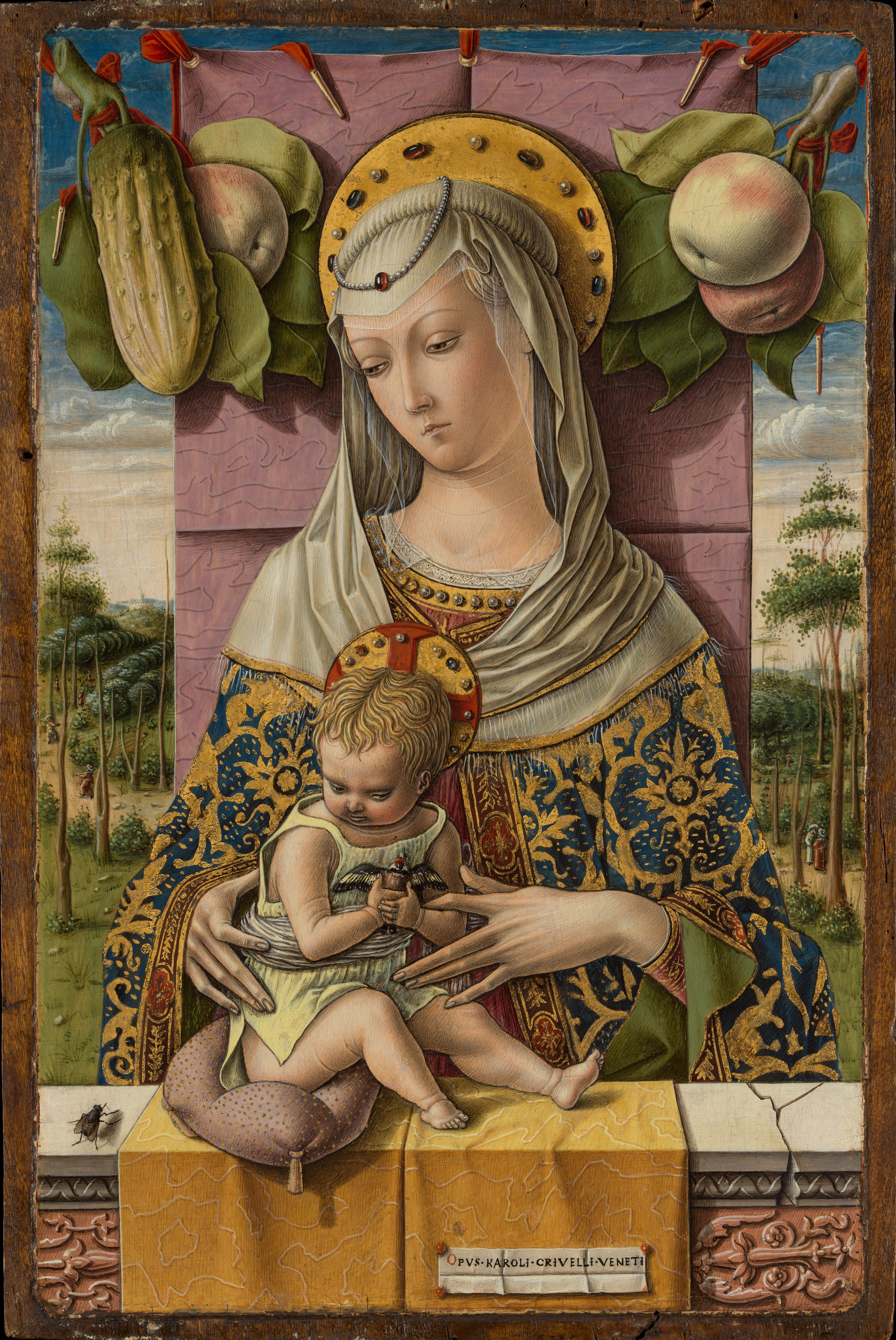
- Artist: Carlo Crivelli
- Year: 1480
- Medium: tempera and gold on wood
- Subject: Virgin Mary and Jesus
- Dimensions: 25 cm (14 7/8 in × 10 in)
- Location: Metropolitan Museum of Art, New York City

The Lenti Madonna, Bache Madonna, or Madonna and Child is a tempera and gold painting that was painted on a wooden panel by the Italian Renaissance artist, Carlo Crivelli, in the early 1470s to the late 1480s. The Lenti Madonna's object dimensions, overall, are (14 7/8 x 10 in.) or (37.8x25.4 cm). With the painted surface alone, the painting is (14 3/8 x 9 1/4 in.) or (36.5 x 23.5 cm). This painting is located at the Metropolitan Museum of Art in New York City. The painting is small in size, which can hint to its intended purpose for private devotion for the painting’s original patron. This painting depicts a popular iconographic religious scene of the Virgin Mary holding Baby Jesus close to her chest. Crivelli’s Lenti Madonna is artistically decorated with biblical symbols that were common for the time it was created. A few common but important objects of symbolism would include: the hanging apples and pickle surroundings Mary’s head, the lone fly, and the European Goldfinch that Baby Jesus is holding in his hands. Even though the painting is small in size, it has a lot of details within the fabrics and textures, which have resulted in a hyper-realistic style that can be traced back to Flemish art.

== History ==
Located at the bottom of the art piece, there is an inscription on a depiction of a piece of folded up paper. The inscription says, "OPVS KAROLI CRIVELLI VENETI" or, when translated to English, "Done by Carlo Crivelli from Venice". Currently, it is on display at the Metropolitan Museum of Art in New York. The piece had first entered the museum in 1943, for "The Bache Collection" exhibit that occurred from June 16th to September 30th, 1943.

Small and intended for private devotion, it was probably the work seen by Orsini around 1790 in Pier Giovanni Lenti's house in Ascoli Piceno with a "K" in its signature rather than the more usual "C" - the alternative candidate is the Ancona Madonna (probably c. 1480), but that is signed "CAROLI" not "KAROLI". The first definitive mention of the work dates to 1852, placing it in the Jones Collection in Clytha, from which it passed to the Baring Collection in 1871 and then the Northbrook Collection. The Duveen Brothers acquired it in 1927, ceding it to Jules S. Bache, before finally passing to its present collection.

== Description ==
The Madonna stands behind a parapet, only showing a half-figure from the waist up. There, a pink cushion with gold tassels is placed on top of the parapet, while yellow silk lays on top of it (where a hanging card bears Crivelli's signature). Baby Jesus is seated on the cushion, clutching a little goldfinch in his hands, a symbol of his future Passion. Behind Mary is a lavender curtain that is identified as a cloth of Honor, which is being held up by red laces with gold aglets. These red laces also hold up a festoon of leaves, large apples and a cucumber. Behind this scene is a natural landscape that can be seen on both sides of the Virgin Mary. This landscape identifies that Mary and Baby Jesus are located in the holy land. Symbols that hint of this are the background figures. These figures are wearing turbans. During this time period of the Renaissance, 1480s, the introduction of turbans were used to identify individuals who were from the Eastern Mediterranean lands (not from Western Europe, categorized as “others”).

Flemish influence (Northern Renaissance) is predominant within this piece. To start off, its miniature scale is more commonly found and used in Flemish art; it is a handheld size. In the painting, there are large amounts of hyper realistic details of the scene, fabrics, etc. which may have been influenced from Northern art. This would include: the cloth of honor, the yellow textured silk, Mary’s gold and blue garment, her long and expressive hands, the hanging fruit and fly, the engraved parapet, and the landscape that can be viewed from beyond the centered figures. In addition, influenced from the North, is the display of material wealth symbolizing divinity. This is shown with Mary and Jesus’ halos. Their halos are made from gold, as they have a design of assorted precious gems that frame their heads.

Stylistic details bring the dating of the work close to works such as the 1476 Altarpiece and the Second Triptych of the Valle Castellamo.

== Symbolism ==
=== Hanging Fruits and Pickle ===
The large apples and pickle symbolize major key elements of the religious story of the Garden of Eden. The apples in both the painting and story represent the Forbidden fruit, which will poison anyone who ingests them. However, the singular pickle symbolizes the antidote to the poison because it was believed that pickles represented resurrection. The apples symbolize sin, while the pickle references redemption and the soul. The red long lace that holds up the cloth of Honor and the festoon tied to it, has a serpent like body. Representing the snake of sin from the Garden of Eden.

=== Fly ===
Located at the lower left side of the painting, is a common bug, the fly. However, it is abnormally large as it is not proportionate to the rest of the painting. The fly is in similar size or possibly larger than the feet of the Baby Jesus. With these comparisons, the fly can be identified to be a trompe l’oeil, or a trick of the eye. This trompe l’ oeil was created with the intention of trickery for the viewers to fall for. The fly is made to look like it had physically landed on the piece, and not be a part of the actual composition. Crivelli was known for these playful antics when it came to painting flies. At a young age, Crivelli was able to fool Cimabue—Crivelli worked in his studio in his early active years—more than once into trying to brush the flies off his paintings until realizing they were all tricks. These flies were physical signs of the self-defined superiority of his own skills in naturalism. They were to show off his skills and humor due to the trickery it has resulted in.

Biblically, the fly symbolizes the devil’s lure or Beelzebub, a personification of one of the seven deadly sins. Beelzebub is defined as “the prince of devils” in Matthew (12:24) or the “lord of the flies” in Hebrew. The fly’s presence identifies the entrance of sin that was brought by either Satan himself or by one of his followers.

=== European Goldfinch ===
The European goldfinch has Christological importance. It commonly symbolizes the Passion of Christ and his Crucifixion. It was during the Renaissance that the Goldfinch was assigned these meanings because of its biblical connections with Jesus Christ. It was expressed in paintings like the Madonna and Child, and stories of the Crucifixion. These symbolic meanings would include: the soul, sacrifice, death, and Resurrection. This concept stemmed from a post-biblical legend that during Jesus’s Crucifixion, a goldfinch landed on him as he was nailed to the cross, and began to pluck out the thorns from his crown. This story created biblical symbolism of the color of the bird’s face. The red feathers were symbolically connected to the blood that dripped down Jesus’ face as it removed the thorns. In addition, it explained the goldfinch’s diet of thorns and thistles.

Noting how the goldfinch is posed in this painting, it is similar to the one that Jesus is bound to on the cross during his Crucifixion. The Baby Jesus, with both hands, holds and embraces the bird close to the center of his chest. This symbolizes his full acceptance of his destiny with open arms, as he doesn’t allow the bird to move or escape his grasp. His tiny thumbs push up against the sides of the wings to prevent movement out of its current pose.
