= Altobello Melone =

Italian painter

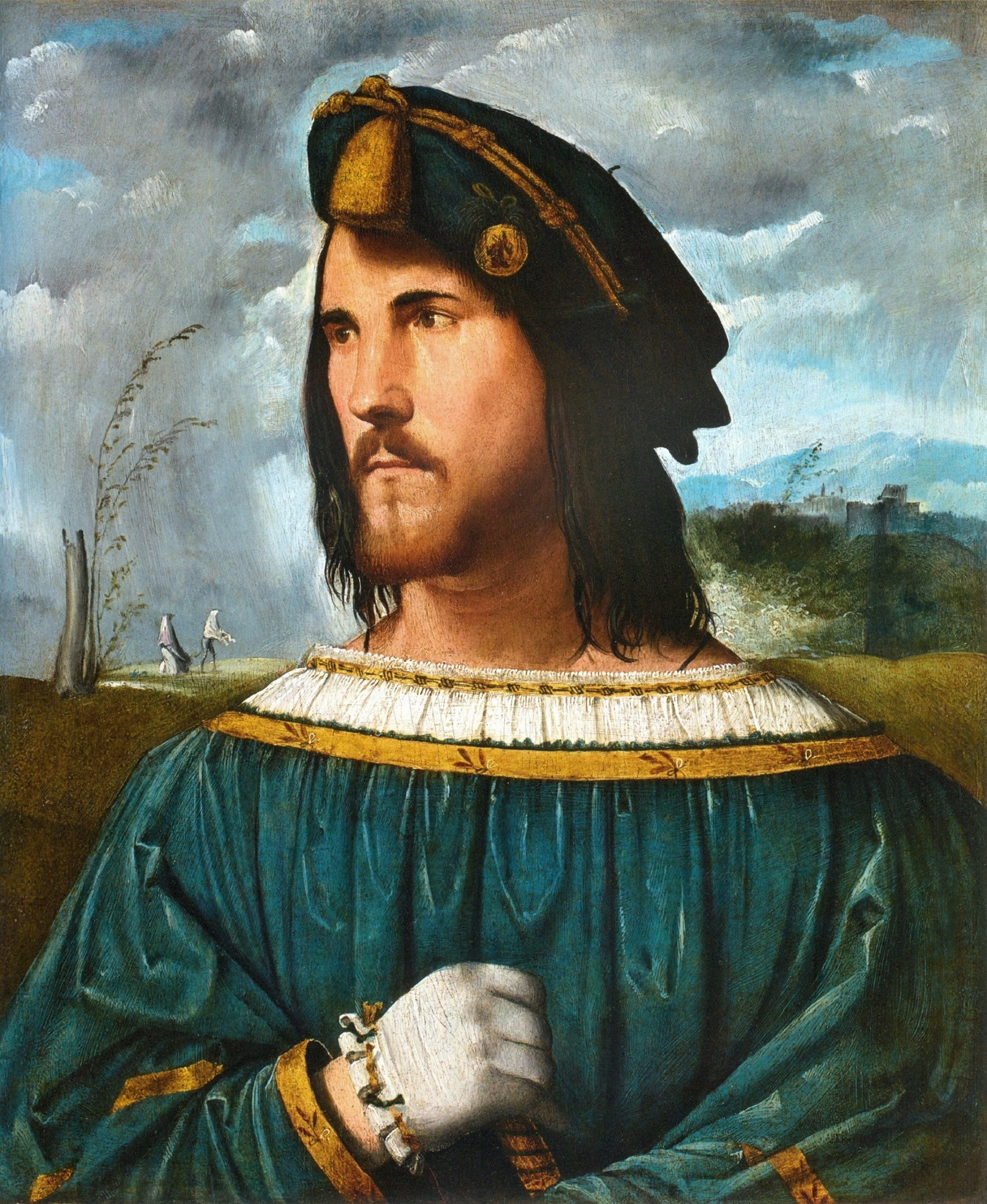
Portrait of a Gentleman (Cesare Borgia) by Altobello Melone, Accademia Carrara, Bergamo

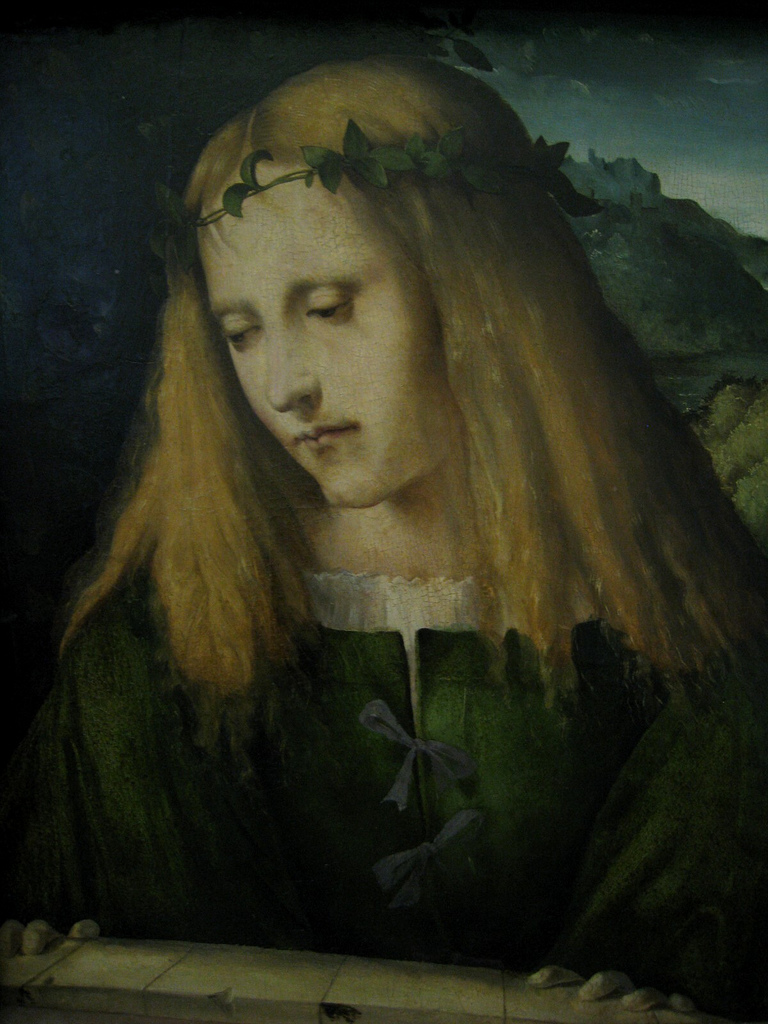
Narcissus at the Fountain

Altobello Melone (c. 1490–1491 – before 3 May 1543) was an Italian painter of the Renaissance.

== Biography ==
Melone was born in Cremona. His work merges Lombard and Mannerist styles. In Cremona, he encountered the elder Girolamo Romanino. He was commissioned in December 1516 to fresco the Cathedral of Cremona, work which continued until 1518. His contract required that his frescoes be more beautiful than those of his predecessor, Boccaccio Boccaccino. He worked alongside Giovanni Francesco Bembo and Paolo da Drizzona. Francesco Prata was influenced by Melone.

Melone contributed frescoes to the Cathedral of Cremona in 1516. The Lamentation in the Pinacoteca di Brera comes in all probability from the church of Saint Lorenzo in Brescia and is dated 1512. The stylistic convergence with Romanino is particularly obvious, such that the contemporary Venetian Marcantonio Michiel describes the Cremonese painter as a "disciple of Armanin".

Moreover, in his masterpiece frescoes, Melone aims to be an interpreter of the anticlassicism and "expressionist" language emerging in the work of Romanino. The seven scenes realized by Altobello evince a new forcefulness – the Massacre of the Innocents is emblematic of this quality, which is manifest in the gestures and in the grotesque transformation of the faces.

== Selected works ==
- Madonna and Child with Saint John (c. 1510) – Accademia Carrara, Bergamo
- Adoration of the Christ Child (c. 1510) – Kunsthaus, Zürich (warehouse)
- Madonna with Child (c. 1511) – Pinacoteca Ambrosiana, Milan
- Lamentation over the Dead Christ (1512) – Pinacoteca di Brera, Milan
- Transfiguration – Szépművészeti Múzeum, Budapest
- Portrait of Gentleman (Cesare Borgia) – Accademia Carrara, Bergamo
- Embrace of Lovers – Gemäldegalerie, Dresden
- Embrace of Lovers – Szépművészeti Múzeum, Budapest
- Adoration of the Christ Child (1512–1514) – Museo Berenziano, Cremona
- Portrait (1512–1515) – Pinacoteca di Brera, Milan
- Lamentation over the Dead Christ – Archiepiscopal Picture gallery, Milan
- Christ Bearing the Cross (c. 1515) – National Gallery, London
- Mercy – Pinacoteca Tosio Martinengo, Brescia
- Road to Emmaus (c. 1516–1517) – National Gallery, London
- Saint Helena Travels to Jerusalem in Search of the True Cross – private collection
- Frescoes in Cremona Cathedral (1516–1518)
  - Flight into Egypt
  - Massacre of the Innocents
  - Last Supper
  - Washing of Christ's Feet
  - Agony in the Garden
  - Capture of Christ
  - Christ in front of Caiaphas
- Adoration of the Shepherds (c. 1518) – Frescoes detached, Pinacoteca di Brera, Milan
- Resurrection (c. 1517) – Private collection
- Simonino from Trento (c. 1521) – Castello del Buonconsiglio, Trento
- Madonna and Child (1520–1522) – Accademia Carrara, Bergamo
- Madonna and Child with Saints John Nicholas – Civic Museum Wing Ponzone, Cremona
- Narcissus at Fountain – Städel, Frankfurt
- Saint Prospero, Bishop of Reggio Emilia – Hatfield House
- Madonna del Gatto – Church of San Nicolò, Isola Dovarese, province of Cremona, Lombardy

== Sources ==
- Freedberg, Sydney J. (1993). Pelican History of Art (ed.). Painting in Italy, 1500–1600. Penguin Books Ltd. pp. 373–375.
- Paoletti, John T. (2005). "16. Lombardy: Instability and Religious Fervor". Art in Renaissance Italy (3rd ed.). Gary M. Radke. London: Laurence King. p. 384. ISBN 1-85669-439-9.
