= 1476 Altarpiece =

1476 polyptych by Carlo Crivelli

- Italian: Polittico di San Domenico
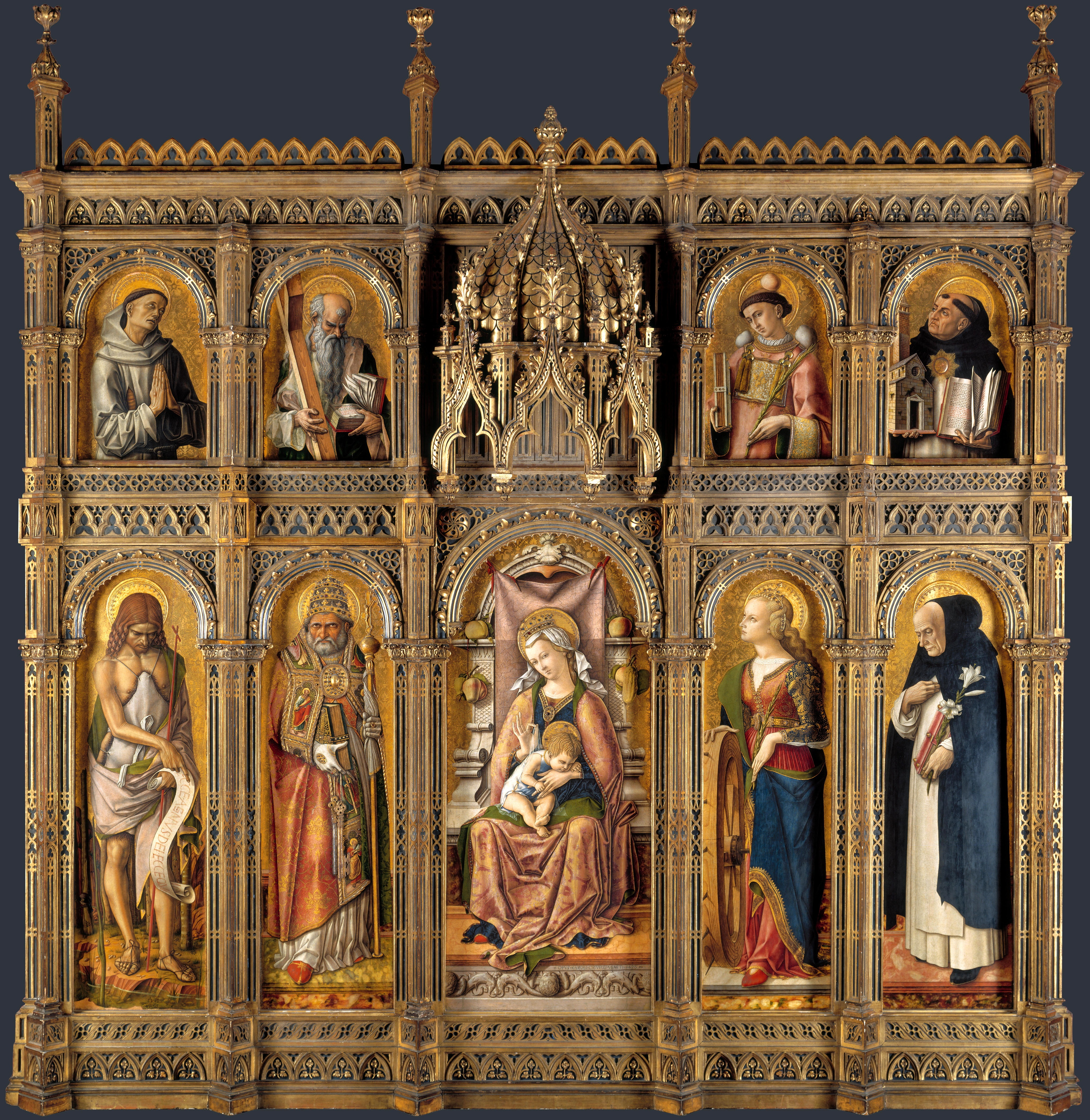
- The London panels
- Artist: Carlo Crivelli
- Year: 1476
- Medium: Tempera and gold on panel
- Condition: Divided
- Location: National Gallery and Metropolitan Museum

The 1476 Altarpiece or San Domenico Altarpiece is a 1476 tempera and gold on panel altarpiece by the Italian Renaissance painter Carlo Crivelli. Its central panel of the Pietà is now in the Metropolitan Museum of Art in New York, whilst the other nine are now in the National Gallery, London.

== History ==
The altarpiece was likely originally constructed for the Dominican church of Ascoli Piceno, given the inclusion of Dominican saints on the lower levels of the altarpiece. The church held another 1476 Crivelli work, the Saint Peter Martyr Altarpiece. Both works were dismantled from their altars c. 1776 due to renovations in the church. They were then sold to an antiquarian, Grossi, who further separated the panels and regrouped them. (The predellas that went with the altarpieces are lost.)

The altarpiece was seen by Luigi Lanzi and purchased by Francesco Saverio de Zelada in Rome in 1789, and it arrived in Florence with the Rinuccini family. The 1476 Altarpiece arrived at London's National Gallery in 1868, having come from the Demidov collection.

Art historians Federico Zeri and Rodolfo Pallucchini reintegrated the formerly separated altarpieces, referring first to the Pietà in the Metropolitan Museum and second to the Madonna in the Museum of Fine Arts of Budapest. In 1961, the National Gallery again disjoined its panels and reconstructed them into two separate polyptychs.

== Description and style ==
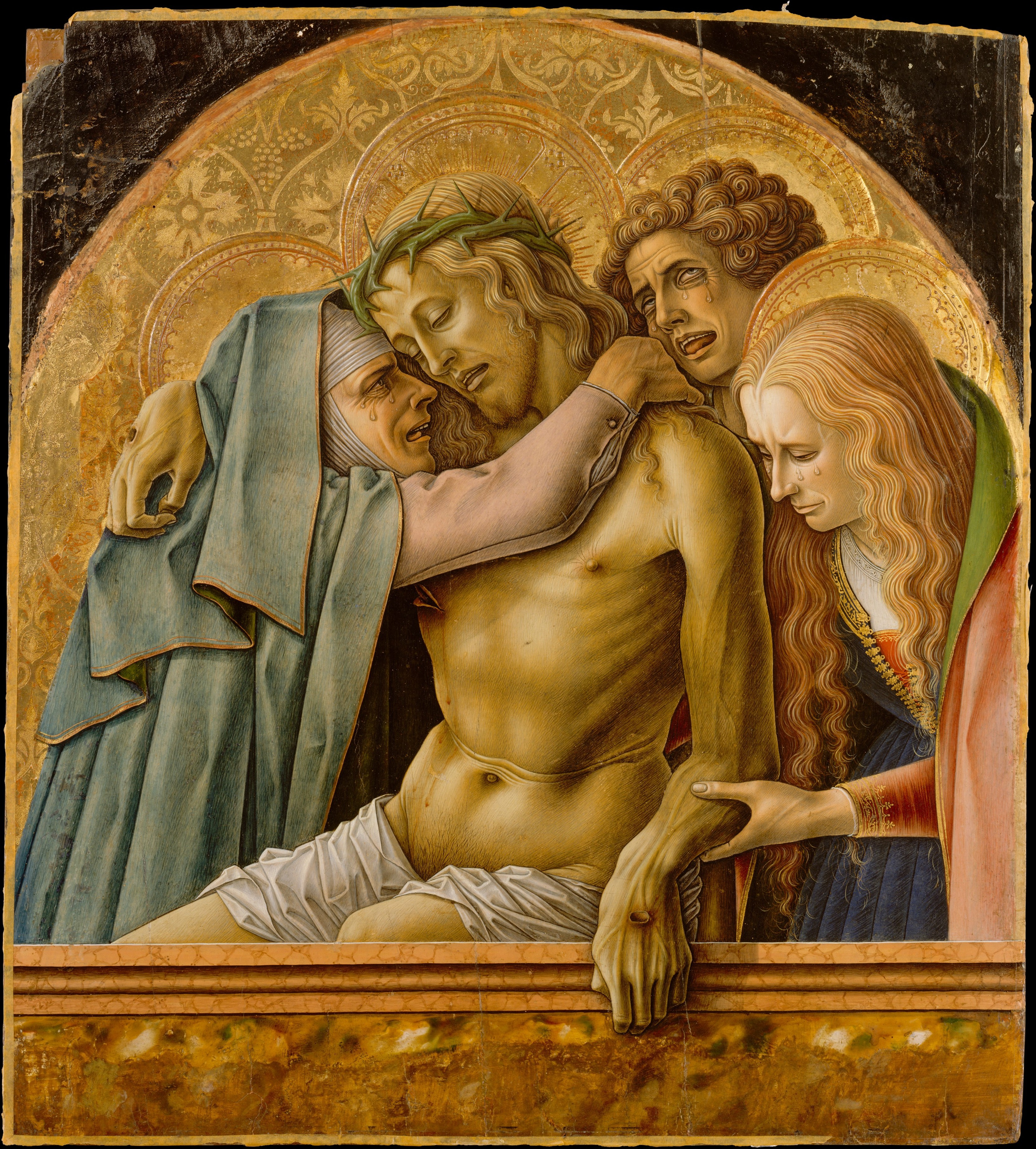
The altarpiece's Pietà panel

The altarpiece has a traditional setting, with a Madonna Enthroned with Child at the center, the saints depicted to the sides, and on the upper level a Pietà and half-figure saints.

The structure of the altarpiece perplexed critics for a long time. Art historians eventually adopted the theory that the altarpiece was actually an assemblage of panels from different sources.

=== Panels ===
Lower register:

- Madonna and Child, 148x63 cm, signed OPVS KAROLI CRIVELLI VENETI 1476
- Saint John the Baptist, 138x40 cm
- Saint Peter, 138x40 cm
- Saint Catherine of Alexandria, 138x40 cm
- Saint Dominic, 138x40 cm

Upper register:

- Saint Francis, 61x40 cm
- Saint Andrew, 61x40 cm
- Pietà, 69x63,5 cm
- Saint Stephen, 61x40 cm
- Saint Thomas, 61x40 cm

=== Possible reconstruction ===
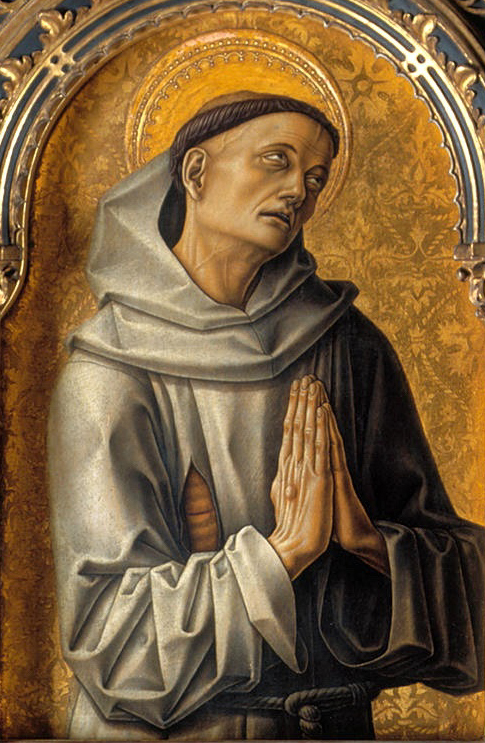

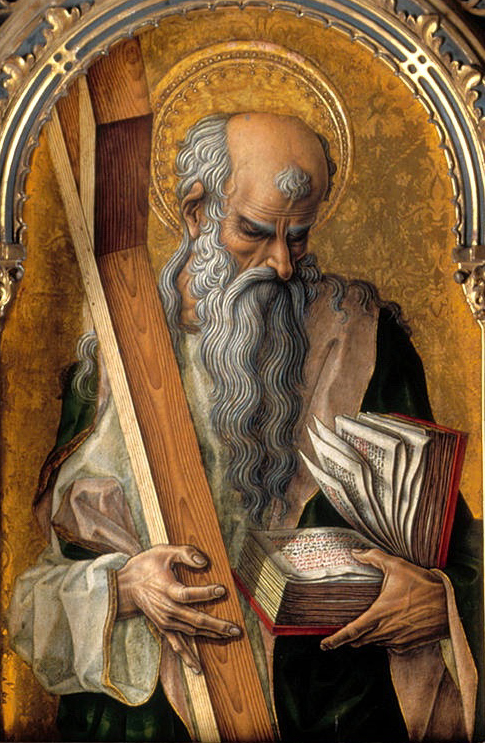

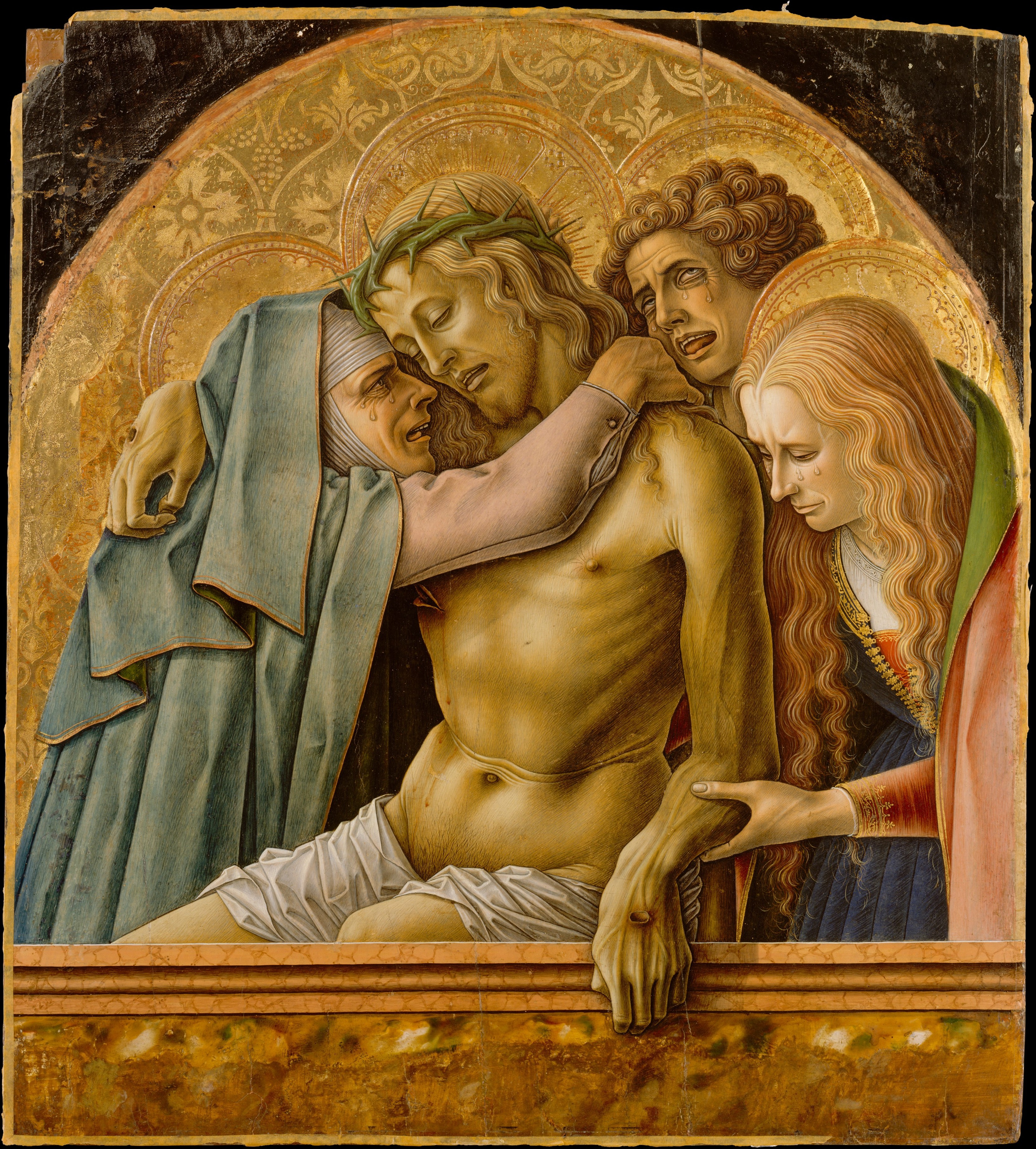

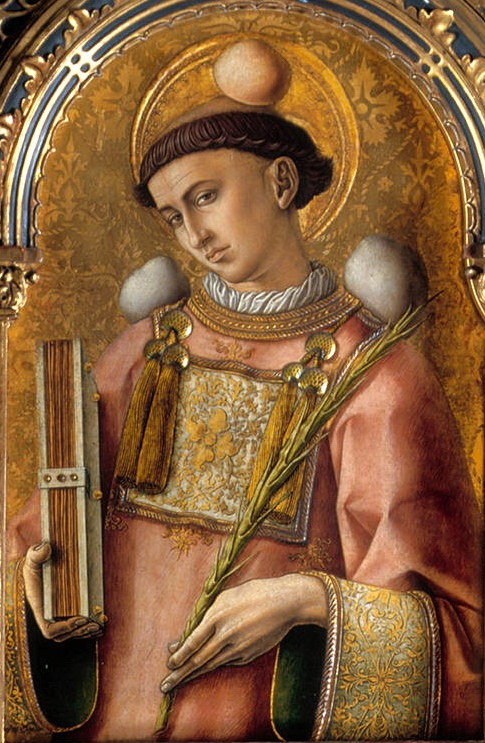

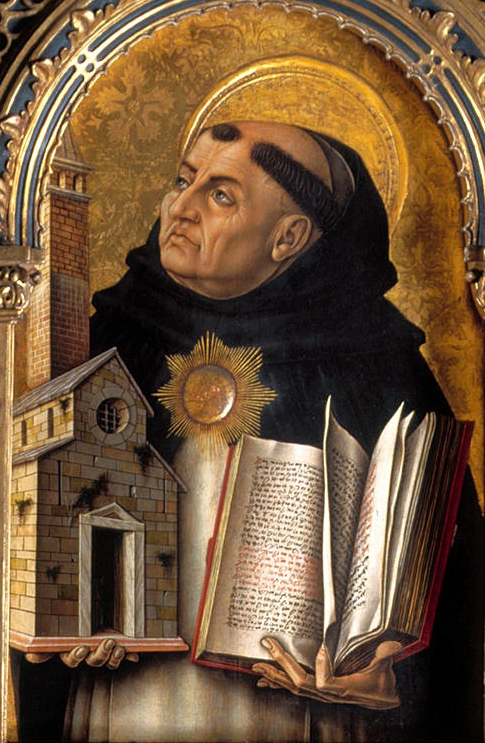

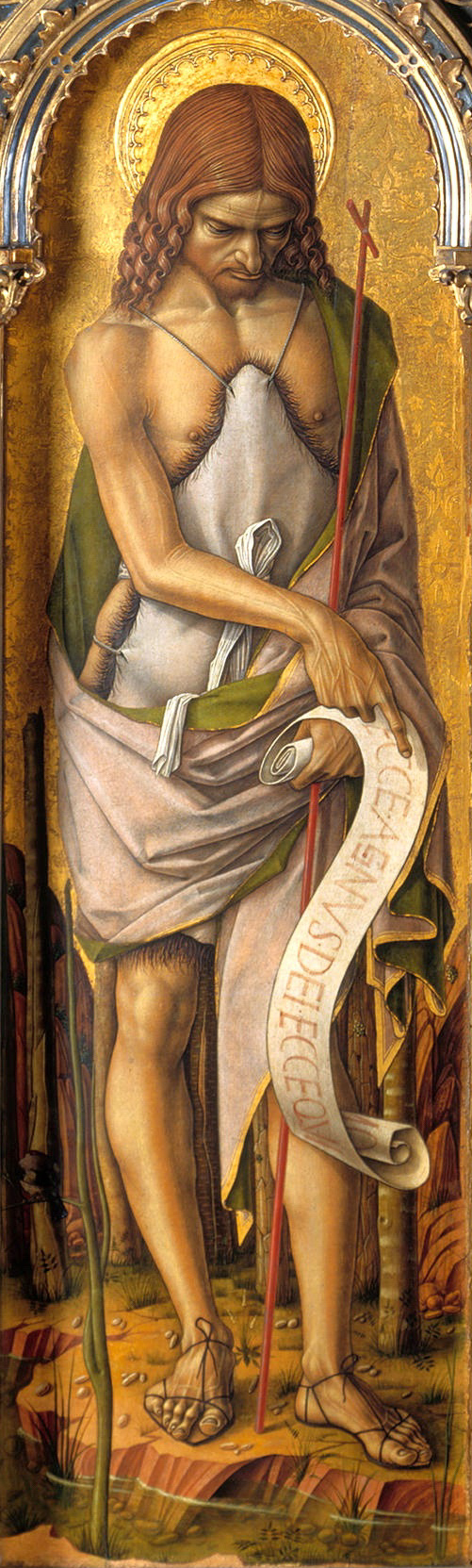

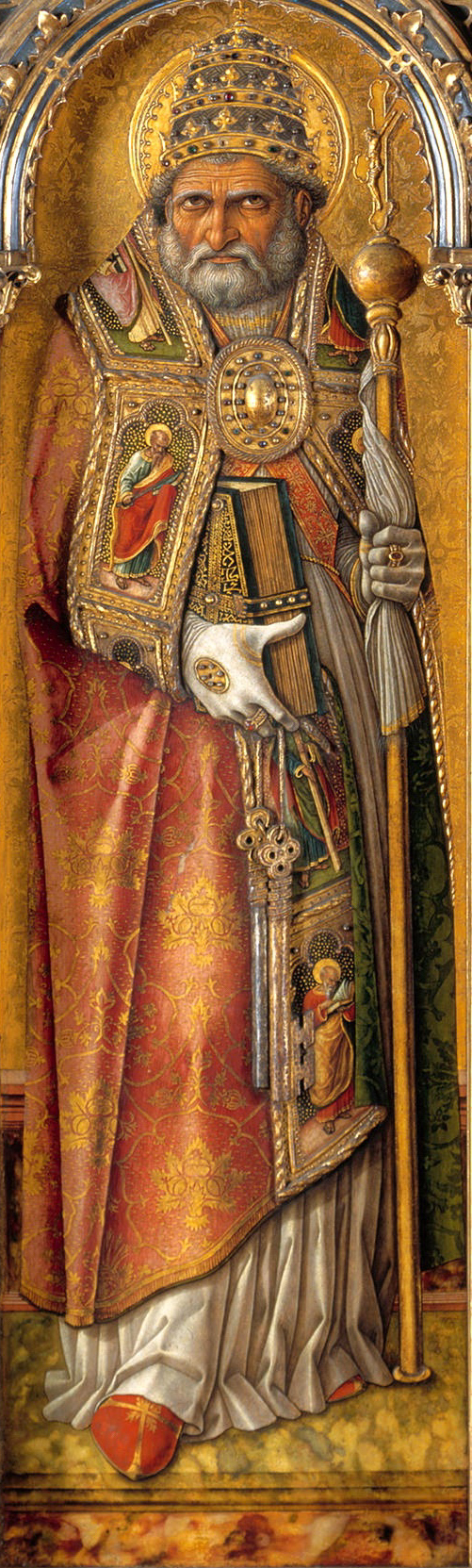

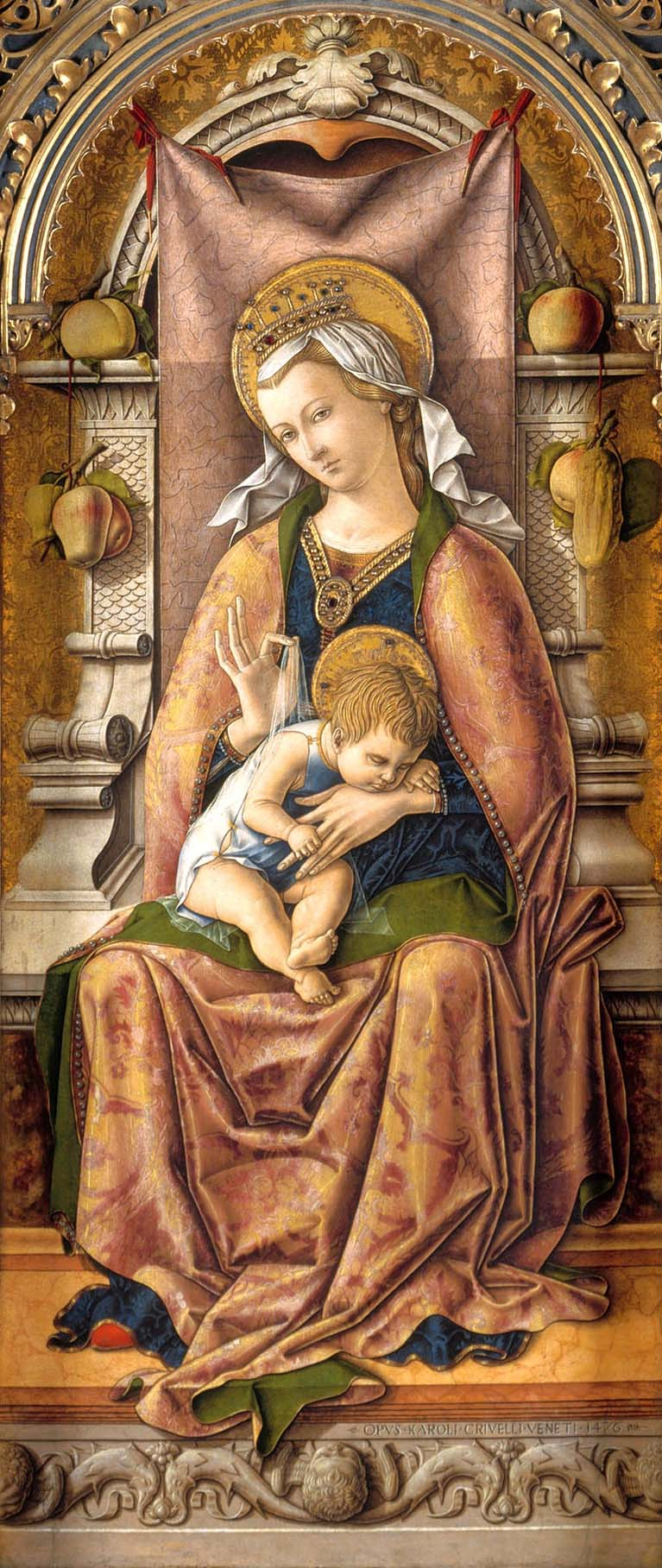

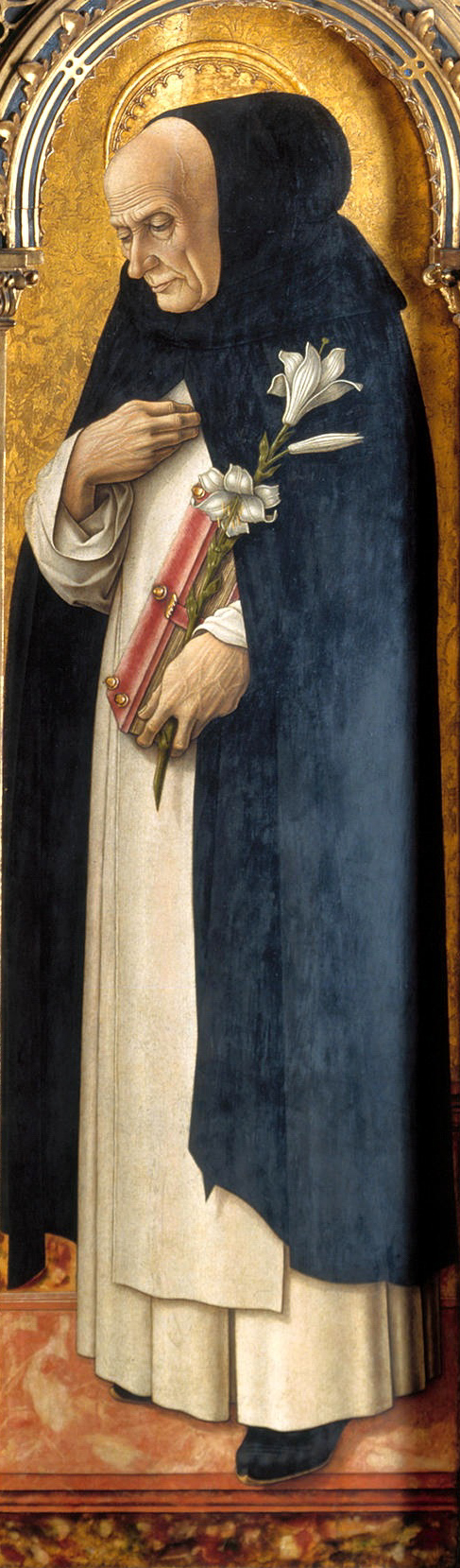

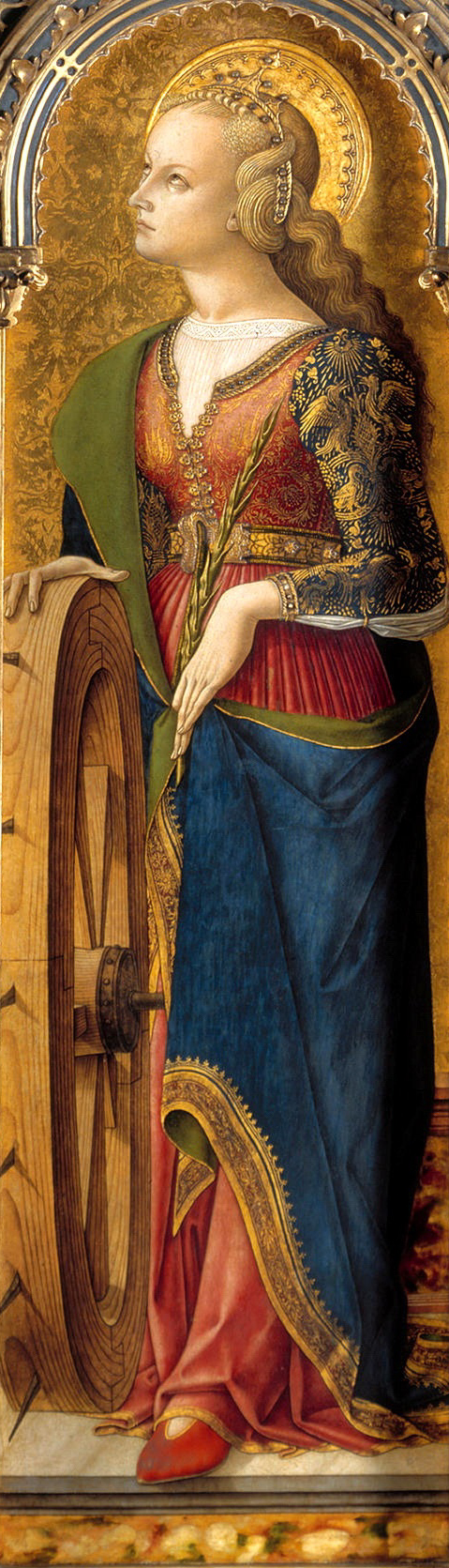

== Bibliography ==
- Zampetti, Pietro (1986). Carlo Crivelli (in Italian). Florence: Nardini Editore.
