= Madonna and Child (Crivelli, Ancona) =

Painting by Carlo Crivelli from 1480

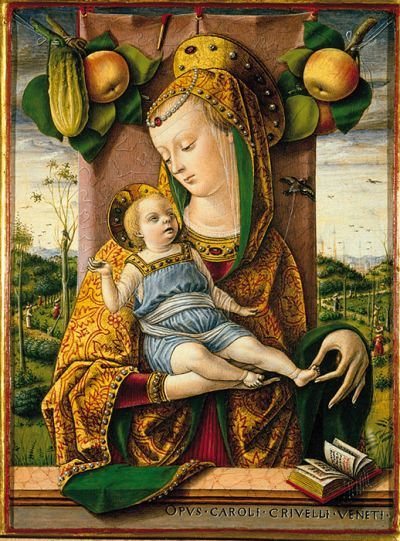
Madonna and Child (c. 1480) by Carlo Crivelli

Madonna and Child is a tempera and gold on panel painting by Carlo Crivelli, executed c. 1480, and signed OPVS CAROLI CRIVELLI VENETI. It is now in the Pinacoteca civica Francesco Podesti in Ancona. Its dating has varied on stylistic grounds between the 1470s and 1480s, close in date to the artist's Lenti Madonna and Madonna and Child with an Apple.

According to Melchiorri (1844), the painting was originally in the Gabriel Ferretti chapel in the church of San Francesco ad Alto in Ancona. The chapel had been built in 1480 by Ferretti's nephew. In 1861 the work was in a closet in that church's sacristy, where it was seen by Cavalcaselle and Giovanni Morelli who noted its "marvellous [state of] conservation" in a catalogue of art objects in the Marche. It was then displayed at the former monastery of San Domenico in the town, before moving to the church of San Francesco alle Scale. It was taken to Urbino during the Second World War and remained there until returning to Ancona in 1950, where it was displayed at the Palazzo degli Anziani and the Palazzo Bosdari before entering its present collection.

== Bibliography (in Italian) ==
- F. Apolloni e M. Tazzoli, Antologia Di Belle Arti, Edizioni 9–12, 1979 (p 47)
- Pietro Zampetti, volume Marche, della collana Itinerari dell'Espresso (editoriale l'Espresso, 1980), p 213;
- Pietro Zampetti, Carlo Crivelli, Nardini Editore, Firenze 1986.
- Pietro Zampetti, Pittura nelle Marche - volume I (Nardini editore, 1988) (p 324);
- Michele Polverari (a cura di), Ancona pontificia (Comune di Ancona, 1994) (p 562);
- Costanza Costanzi, volume Ancona - Pinacoteca civica F. Podesti, della collana Musei d'Italia - Meraviglie d'Italia (Editore Calderini, 1999) (pages 3 and 17);
- Valter Curzi, Pittura veneta nelle Marche, Cariverona, 2000 (p 120);
- Andrea De Marchi, Matteo Mazzalupi (ed.), Pittori ad Ancona nel Quattrocento (Federico Motta editore, 2008)" (p 311).
- Carlo Crivelli, Susanna Avery-Quash, Crivelli e Brera, Mondadori Electa, 2009 (p. 268);
- Grande enciclopedia multimediale dell'arte Opera Omnia Carlo Crivelli (scheda 000005102).
- Pietro Zampetti, La pittura marchigiana del '400 (Electa editrice, senza data - pages 180 and 181);
