= Santo Zago =

Italian painter

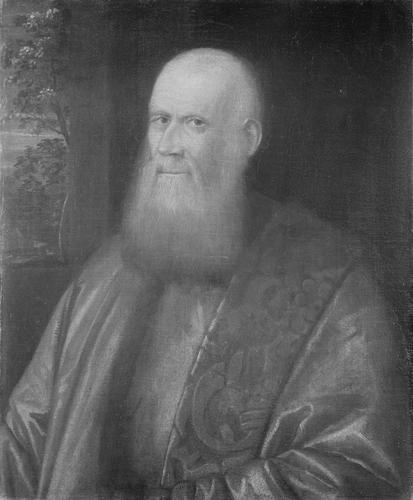

Santo Zago (active 1550) was an Italian painter of the Renaissance period. He was born in Venice, was a follower of Titian. He painted Tobit and the Angel for the church of Santa Caterina.
