= Adoration of the Christ Child =

Adoration of the Christ Child may refer to one of the following Renaissance paintings:

- Adoration of the Christ Child (Bosch), c. 1568 or later
- Adoration of the Christ Child (Bramantino), c. 1485
- Adoration of the Christ Child (Correggio), c. 1526
- Adoration of the Christ Child (Gentile da Fabriano), c. 1420–1421
- Adoration of the Christ Child (Honthorst), c. 1619–1621
- Adoration of the Christ Child (Lippi, Florence), c. 1463
- Adoration of the Christ Child (Lippi, Prato), c. 1455–1466
- Adoration of the Christ Child (Lotto, Kraków), 1508
- Adoration of the Christ Child (Lotto, Washington), 1523
- Adoration of the Christ Child (Uccello), 1431 or 1437
- Adoration of the Christ Child with Saint Jerome, Saint Mary Magdalene and Saint Eustace, by Uccello, c. 1436

== See also ==
- Christ Child
