= San Martino, Bologna =

Roman Catholic church in Bologna, Italy

Coordinates: 44°29′50″N 11°20′48″E

Church of San Martino
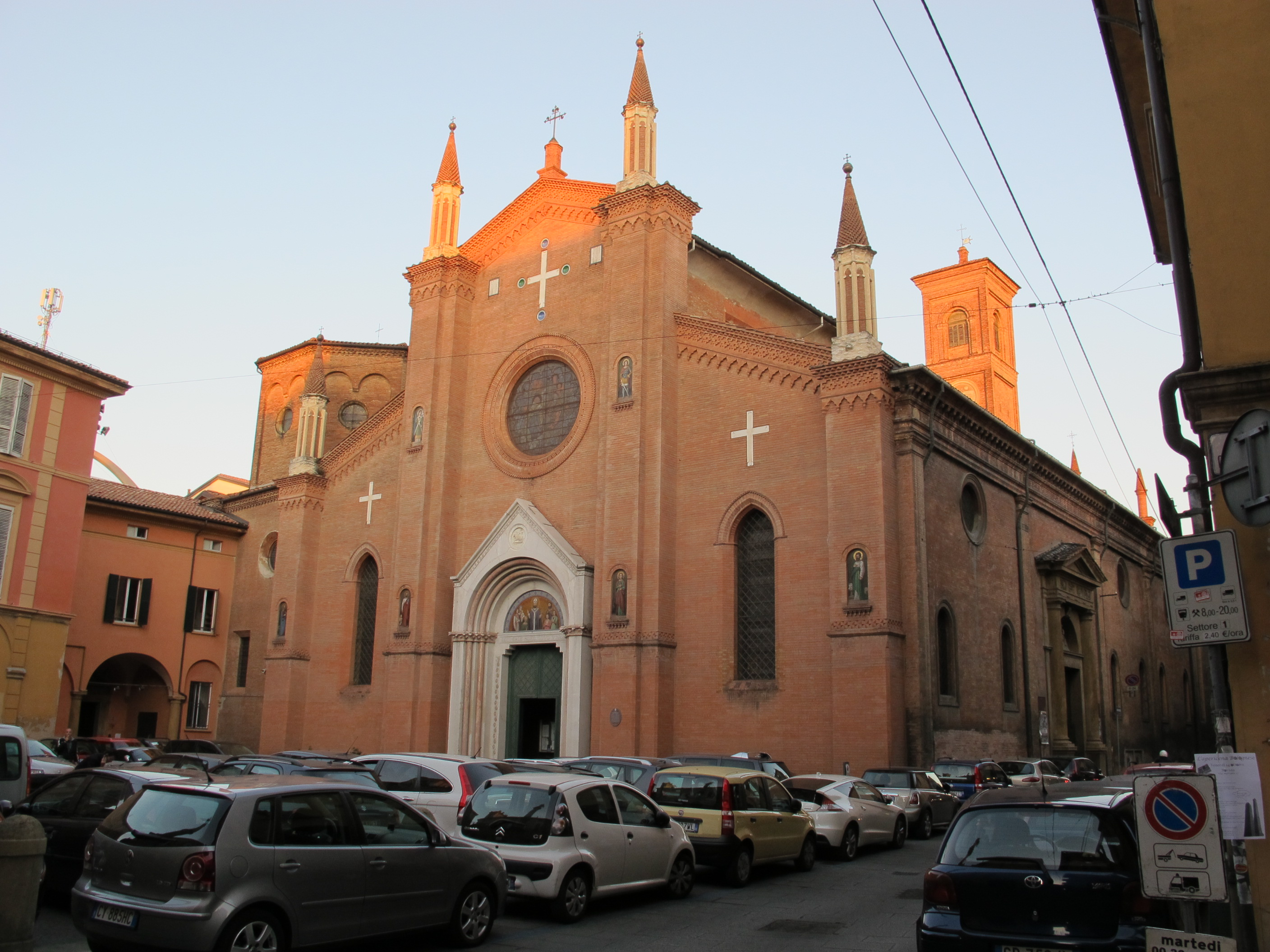

Religion
- Affiliation: Roman Catholic
- Province: Bologna

Location
- Location: Bologna, Italy
- Interactive map of Church of San Martino

Architecture
- Type: Church
- Style: Renaissance
- Groundbreaking: 15th century

San Martino church, also called San Martino Maggiore is a Gothic-style, Roman Catholic church located at the corner of Via Marsala and Via Guglielmo Oberdan in Bologna, region of Emilia Romagna, Italy. The church was founded by the adjacent Carmelite monastery. On 10 August 1704 via the authority of the Vatican Chapter, the venerated image of the Virgin of Mount Carmel was crowned by Pope Clement XI. On 25 August 1941, Pope Pius XII elevated it to the status of basilica.

== History ==
A church at the site was built in 1217. The brick tracery vaults of the ceiling were added in 1457. The present facade was added in 1879, in a Gothic style, and displays statues of various saints. Atop a pillar in the piazza just in front of the church is a statue of the Madonna and Child with a Scapular (1705) by Andrea Ferreri. In the lunette above the side entrance portal is a bas-relief of St Martin on horseback giving half his robe to a Beggar (1531) by Francesco Manzini; the portal has a classical decoration with bucranium (cow skulls).

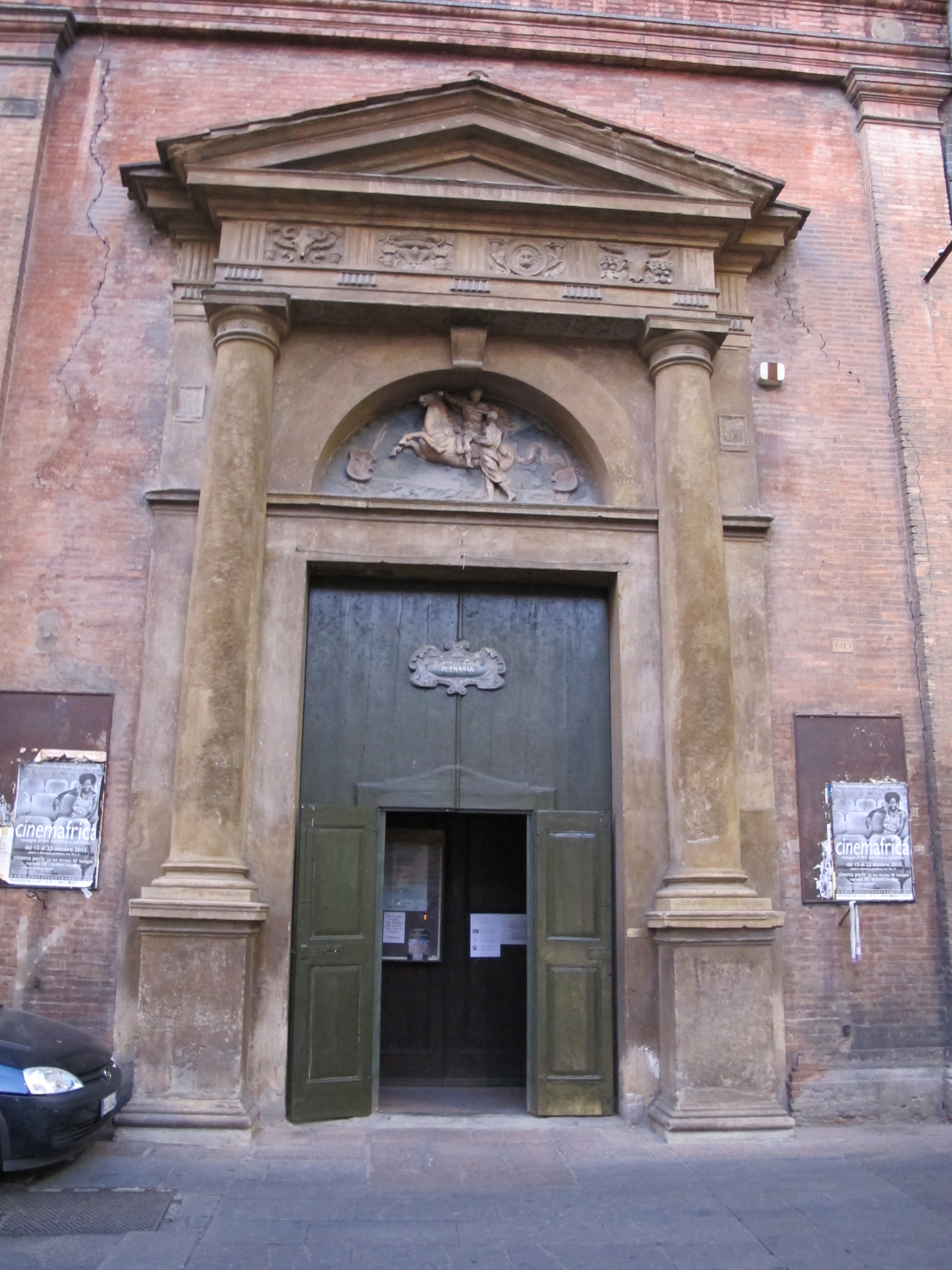
St Martin lunette on lateral (South) Portal

Along the right hand nave is this first chapel is a painting of the Adoration by the Magi (1532) by Girolamo da Carpi. The next one shows Carmelite Saints (mid-17th century) by Cesare Gennari. Along the right hand of the nave, on a stone column, are 15th-century frescoes depicting St Anthony, Onofrius, and Elias by Lippo Dalmasio.

Vitale da Bologna's Crucifixion was completed in the 15th century for this church. The main altarpiece is an Enthroned Madonna with Saints (1548) by Girolamo da Sermoneta.

The first chapel on the left is decorated with an Assumption of the Virgin (1506) by Lorenzo Costa. The statue of Santa Maria Maddalena de Pazzi was named after the ancient and noble family of Pazzi who originally came from Florence. The statue was transferred to the church from the Carmelite monastery of Santa Maria in Florence.

On the left, is a chapel dedicated to the Madonna del Carmine. The sculptural decoration was completed by Alfonso Torreggiani in 1756. Vittorio Bigari, Guglielmo Borgognone, Alessandro Tiarini and Giacomo Sementi also worked on the decoration.

In this last chapel the first above the altar here is the Madonna and Saints by Francesco Francia from the late 15th century, while under the altar table is a Deposition (early 16th century) by Amico Aspertini. This painting of St Elias the Prophet is by Alessandro Guardassoni followed with a fragment of the Nativity (mid-15th century) by Paolo Uccello, and a terracotta statue of the Madonna del Carmine by Jacopo Della Quercia from the 15th century.

In a room next to the church is the sacristy. Along the right hand side of the sacristy is where that small piece of the Nativity by Paolo Uccello used to be. In fact, the fresco spanned the entire side, but was destroyed during reconstructions.

== Sources ==
- Iguidez entry
