= Adoration of the Christ Child (Bosch) =

Painting by a follower of Hieronymus Bosch

Adoration of the Child
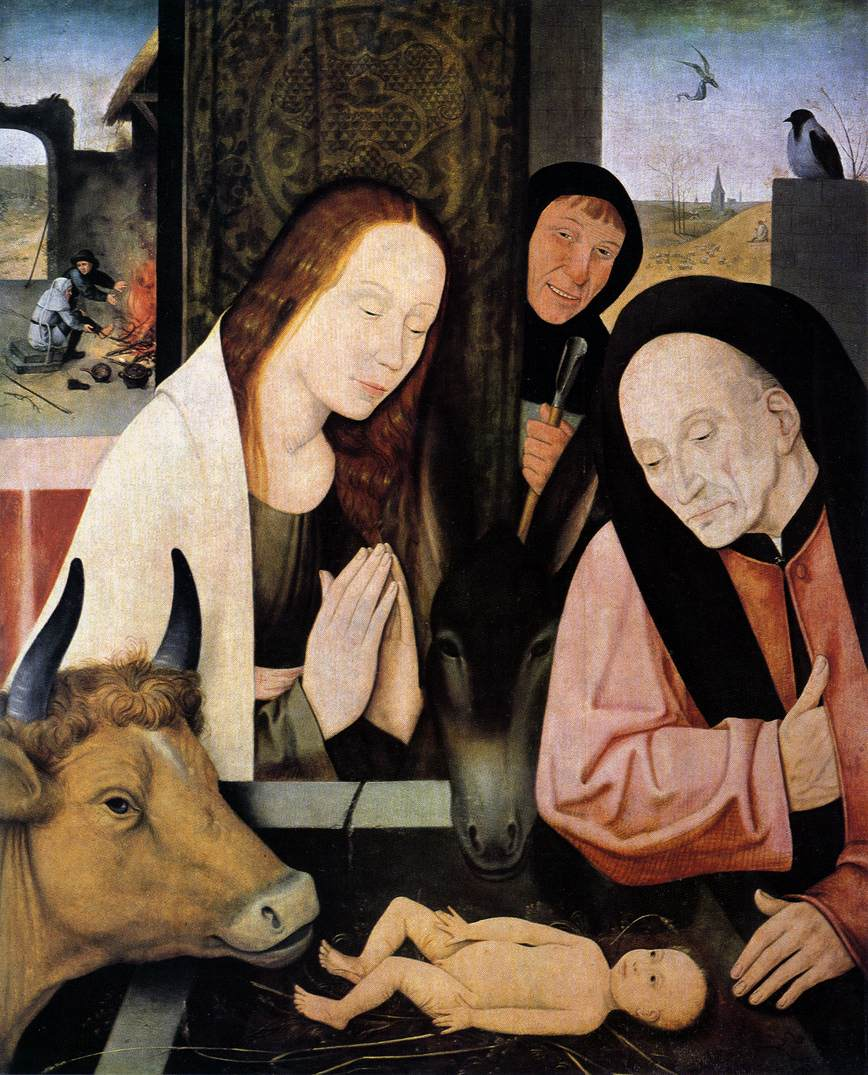
- Artist: Unknown
- Year: c. 1568
- Type: Oil on wood
- Dimensions: 66 cm × 43 cm (26 in × 17 in)
- Location: Wallraf–Richartz Museum; Cologne, Germany

Adoration of the Christ Child is a painting previously attributed to Hieronymus Bosch portraying Mary and the Christ Child. It was created in about 1568, long after Bosch's death. It is held by the Wallraf–Richartz Museum in Cologne, Germany.

== See also ==
- Adoration of the Child (disambiguation)
