= EUROPEUM – European Culture Centre =

- EUROPEUM – Ośrodek Kultury Europejskiej

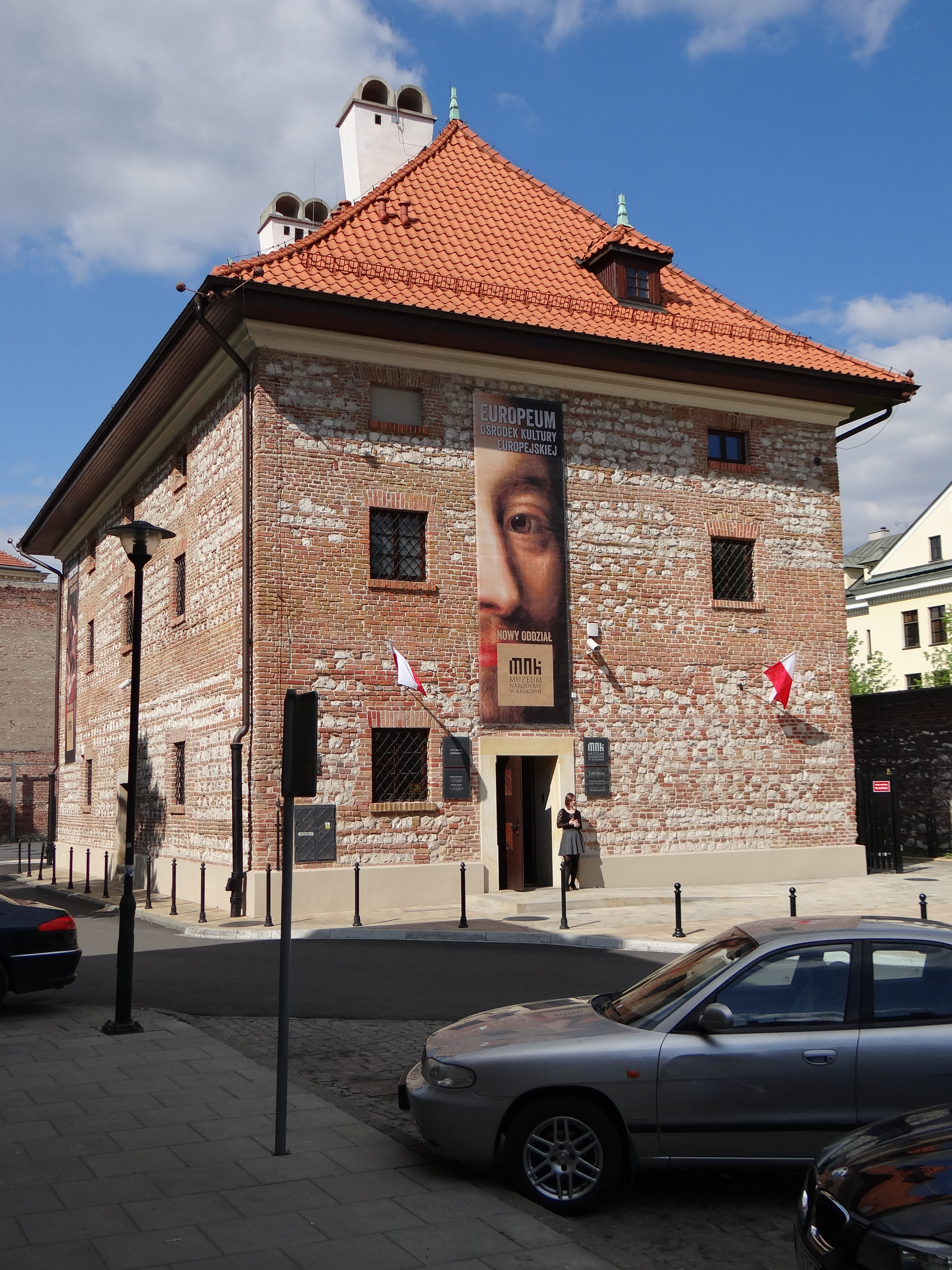
- Location: Sikorski Square 6, Kraków, Poland
- Coordinates: 50.0614°N 19.9291°E
- Type: Art museum
- Accreditation: Kraków National Museum
- Key holdings: The Preaching of St. John the Baptist, Pieter Brueghel the Younger
- Website: Europeum

The EUROPEUM – European Culture Centre is a division of the Kraków National Museum housing a permanent exhibition of European art. Placed on two floors in a restored 17th century granary, the museum was opened to the public on 13 September 2013.

== Building and establishment ==
The museum's building, an old granary from the 17th century, is located in Kraków's Old Town (Stare Miasto) in proximity to a Capuchin monastery. After World War II it became property of the National Museum and in 1969 held a furniture storehouse.

The establishment of the EUROPEUM here was part of a plan to revitalize the area around Sikorski Square and is in line with the National Museum's policy of decentralizing exhibition spaces which it had followed since its establishment in 1879. Originally planned as a museum of contemporary art, its final purpose is the result of a lack of exhibition space in the renovated museum of the Princes Czartoryski Foundation in Pijarska street.

From 2008 to 2013 the building underwent substantial renovation and reconstruction works including conservation and insulation of the facades and foundations, replacement of floors and the roof and new electrical, heating water and waste water systems. The premises were cleared of barracks, new pavements were laid and a lapidarium of several hundred architectural fragments from old buildings in Kraków was created behind the museum. Total costs for the restoration works amounted to 9 million PLN of which 4.7 million came from the National Fund for the Restoration of Historic Buildings and Monuments in Krakow.

== Collection ==
The museum houses more than 100 paintings and sculptures from 7 centuries of history of European art collected since the foundation of the National Museum in 1879 and received mostly through gifts. After WW II, the museum acquired a number of outstanding European artworks such as "Crucifixion" (c. 1340–1350) by Paolo Veneziano, Adoration of the Child (c. 1508) by Lorenzo Lotto, "The Sermon of St. John the Baptist" (c. ) by Pieter Brueghel the Younger, a French 14th-century sculpture "Madonna with the Child" and "The Bishop's Bust" (c. 1500) from the Netherlands. This European Art collection of the National Museum was displayed at the Czartoryski Museum until its restoration in 2010. Its administering body of the Princes Czartoryski Foundation decided that after reopening only the Czartoryski collection was to be on display in its museum forcing the management of the National Museum to find a new place for the European Art collection which was to be the EUROPEUM. Other notable artworks include Catalan medieval Madonnas, Luca Giordano's "Flight into Egypt", "Man of Sorrows" by Jan Gossaert, "Portrait of a Boy with a Bow and a Dog" by Nicolaes Maes, "Portrait of Antonio Canova" by Antonio d'Este, François-Xavier Fabre’s "Portrait of Michał Bogoria Skotnicki" or Bertel Thorvaldsen’s "Mercury".

=== Selected objects ===
Collection highlights
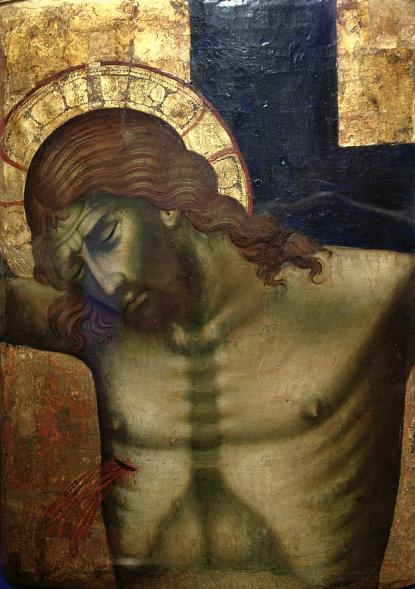
Crucifixion, Paolo Veneziano

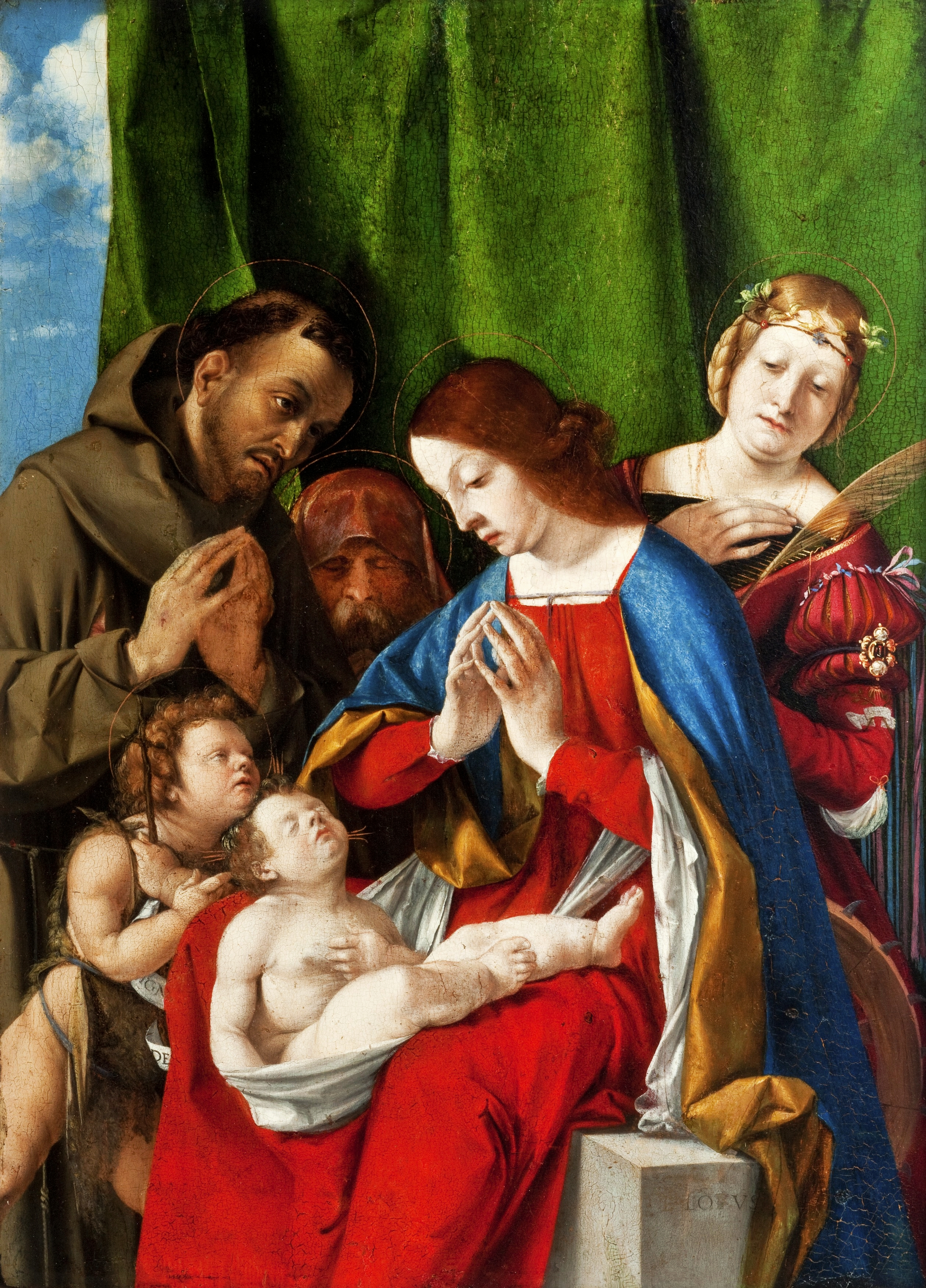
Adoration of the Child, Lorenzo Lotto

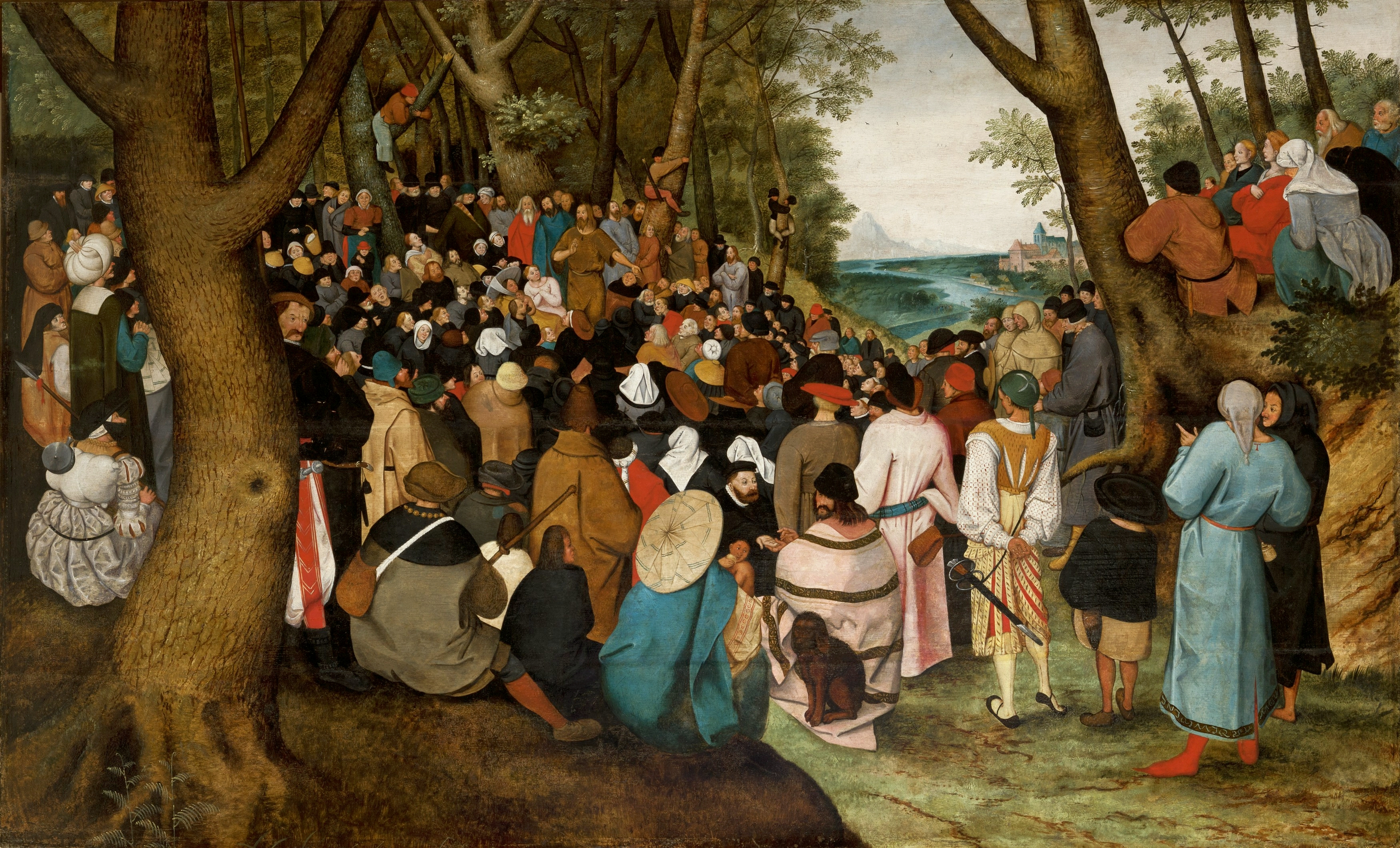
The Sermon of St. John the Baptist, Pieter Brueghel the Younger

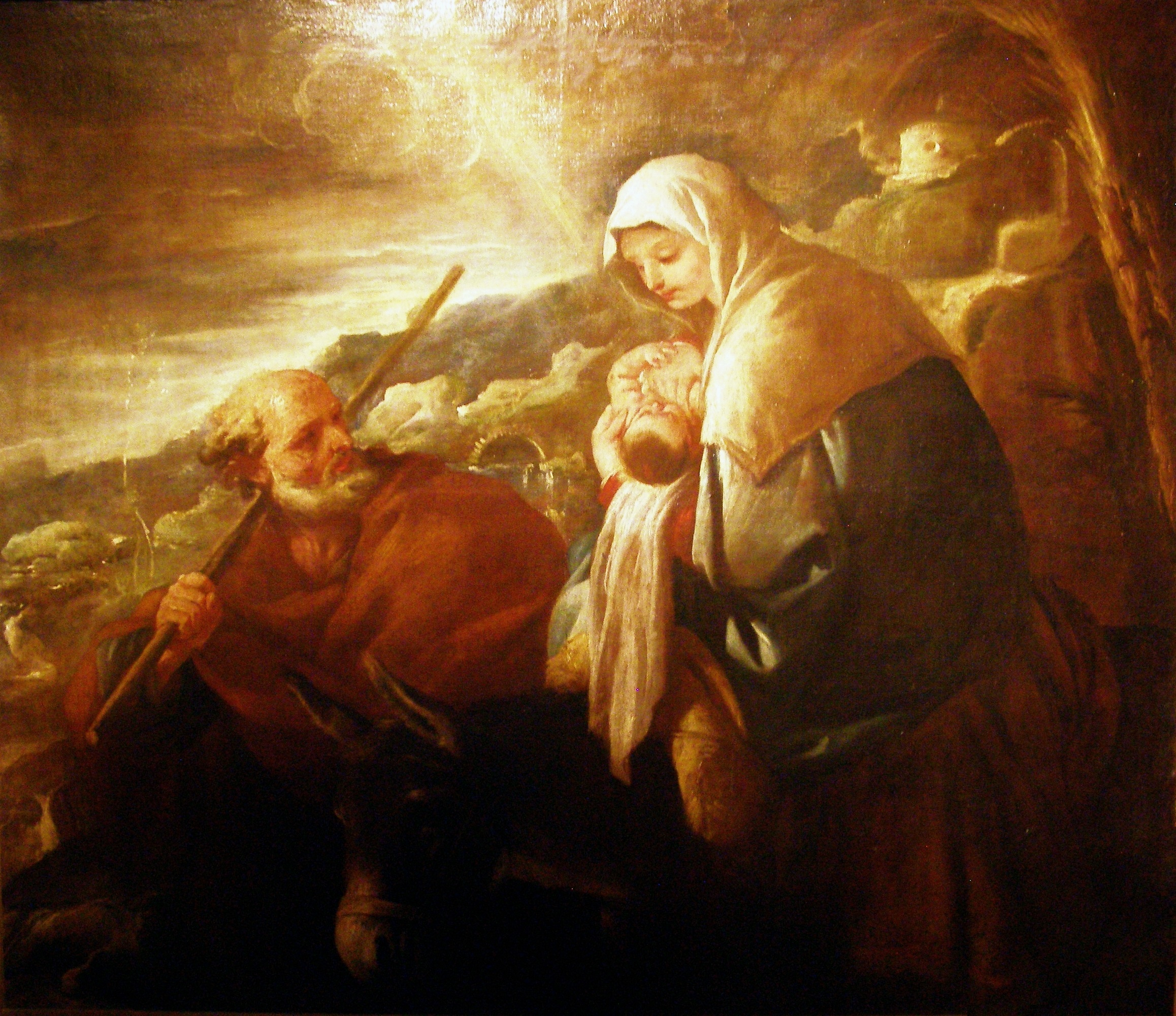
Flight into Egypt, Luca Giordano

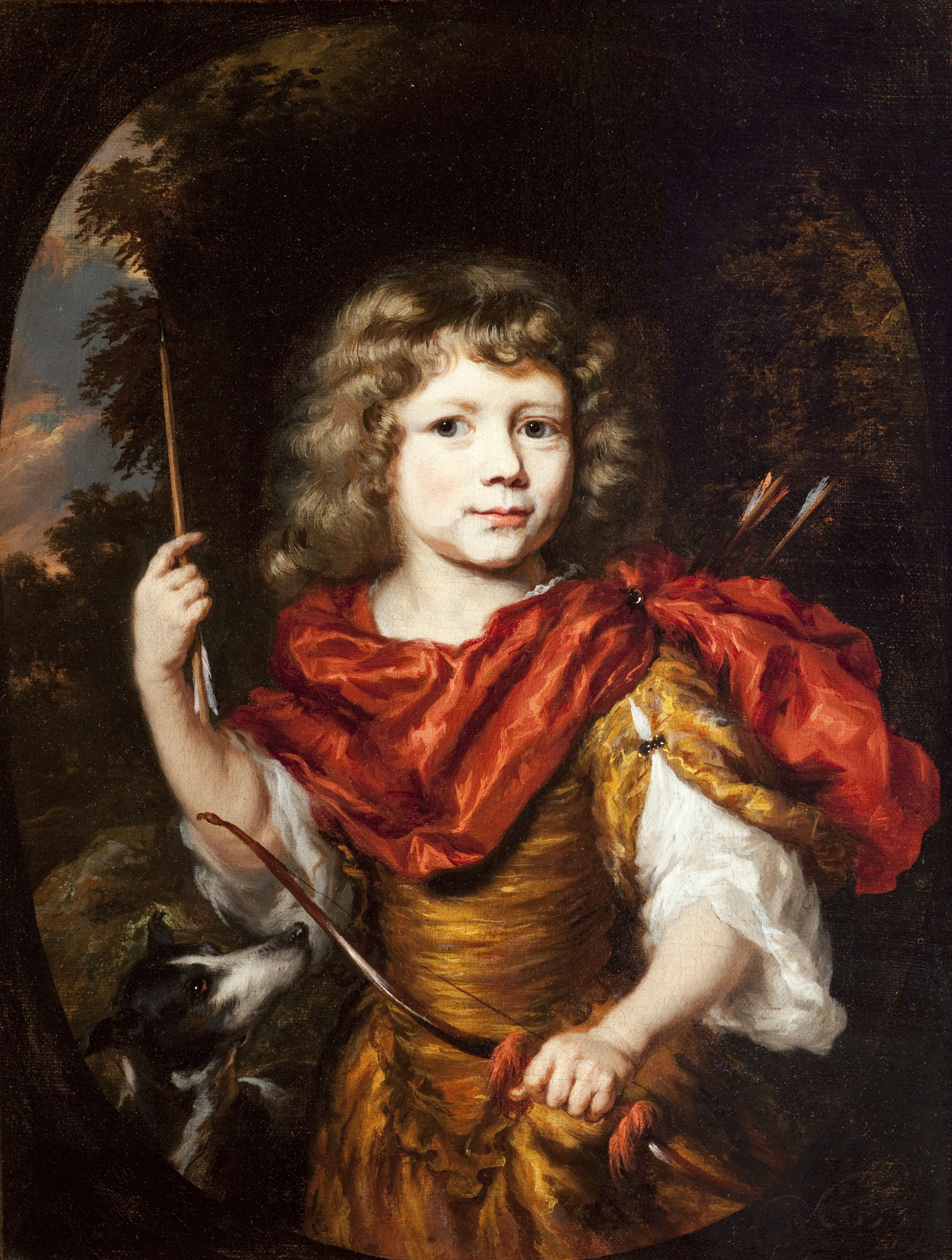
Portrait of a Boy with a Bow and a Dog, Nicolaes Maes

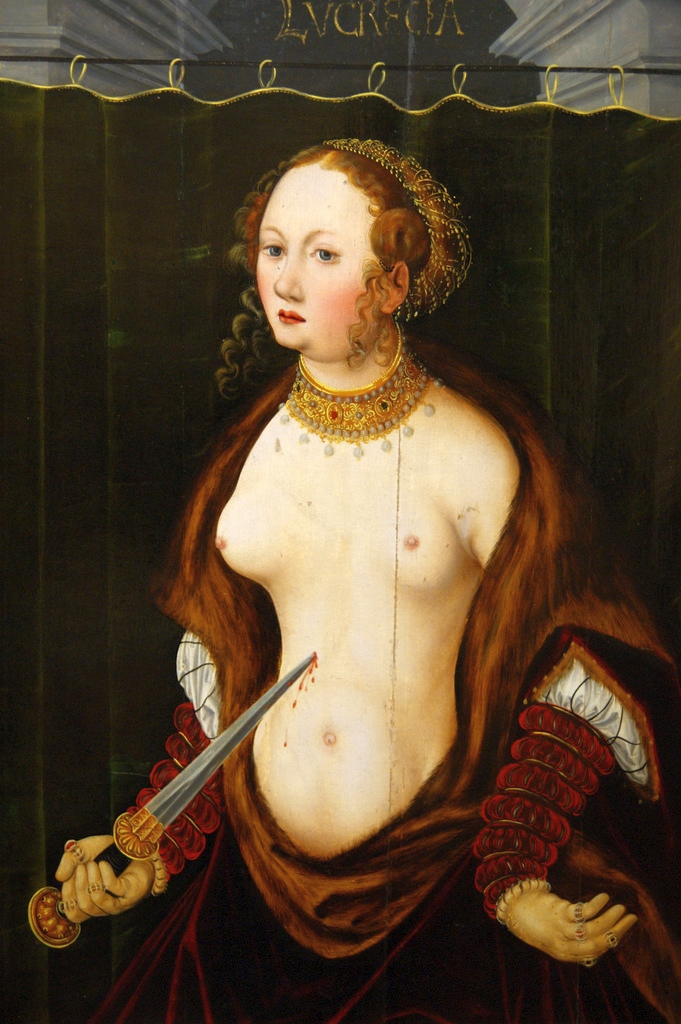
Lucretia, Lucas Cranach the Elder

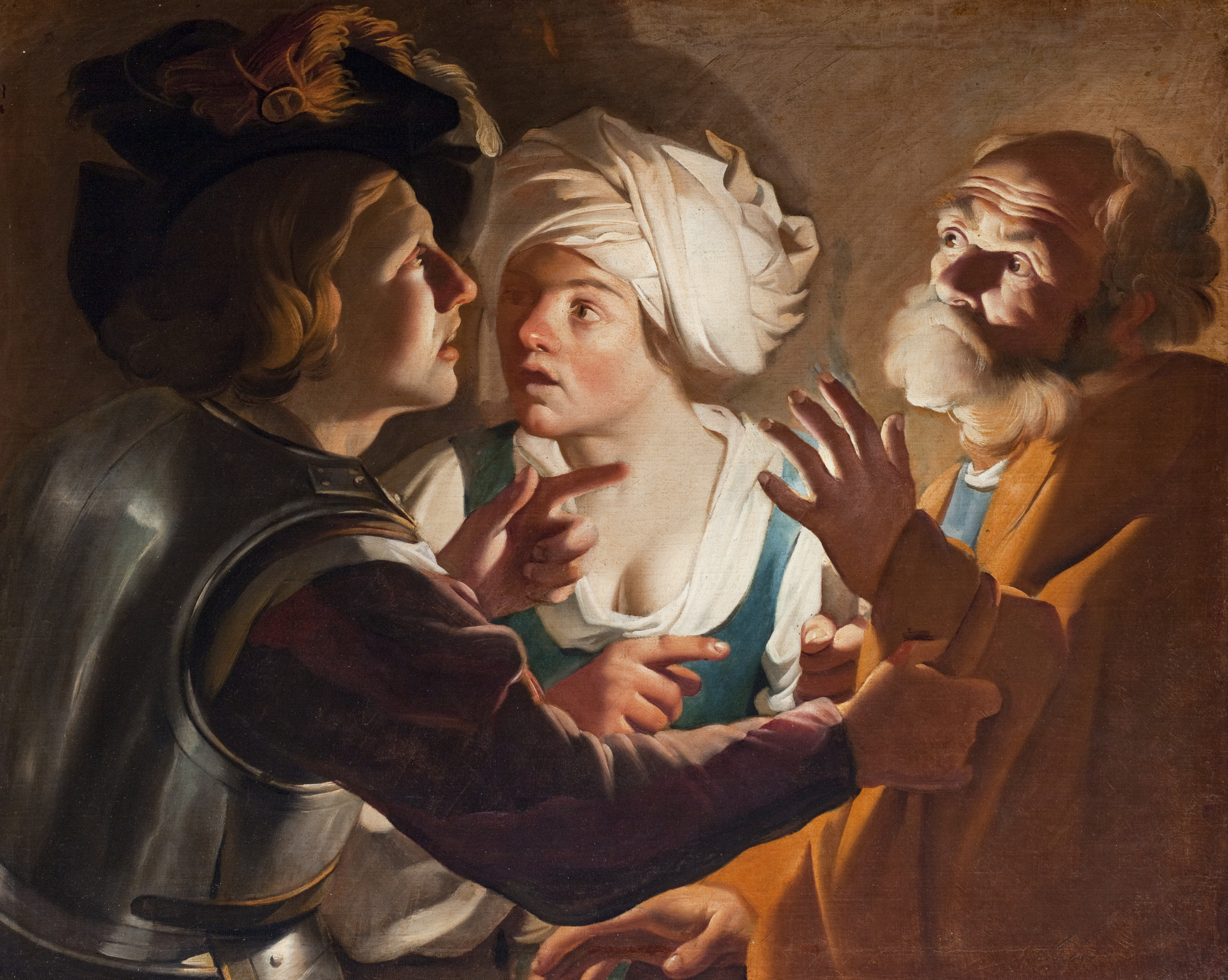
The Denial of Saint Peter, Dirck van Baburen

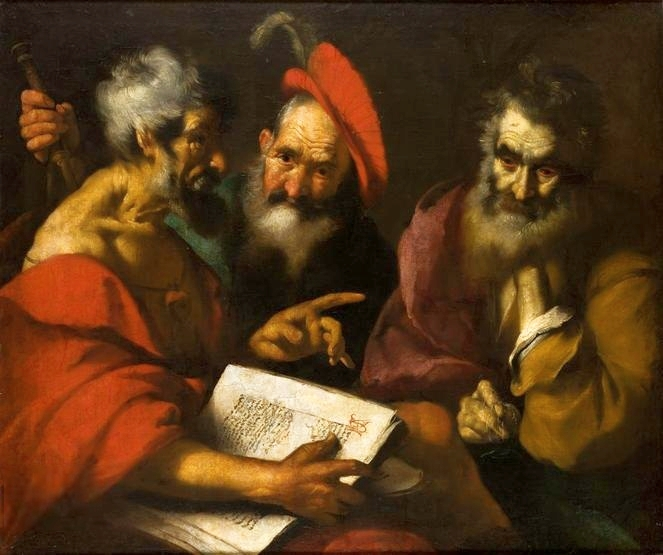
Dispute of the Three Wise Men, Bernardo Strozzi

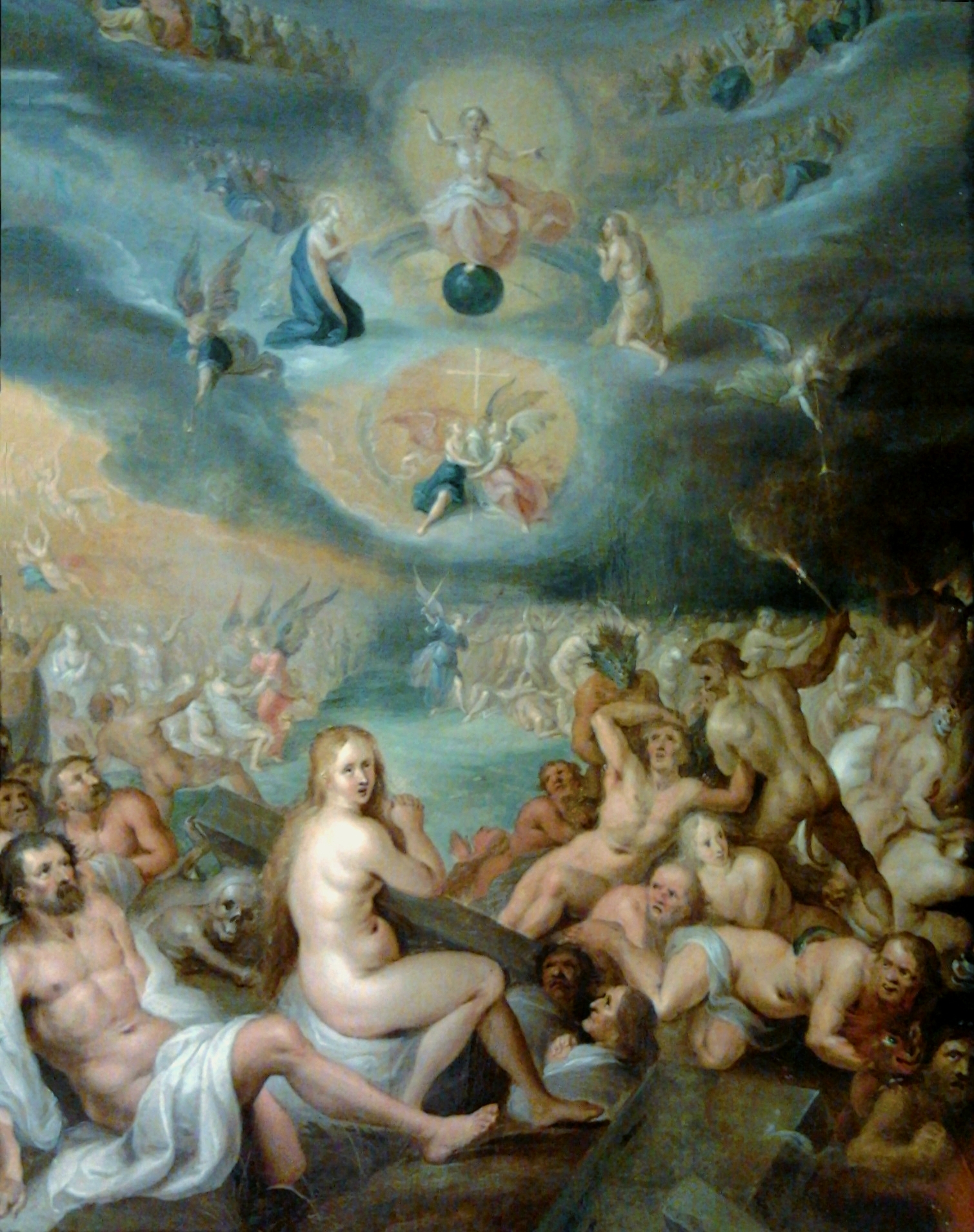
The Last Judgement, Denis Calvaert

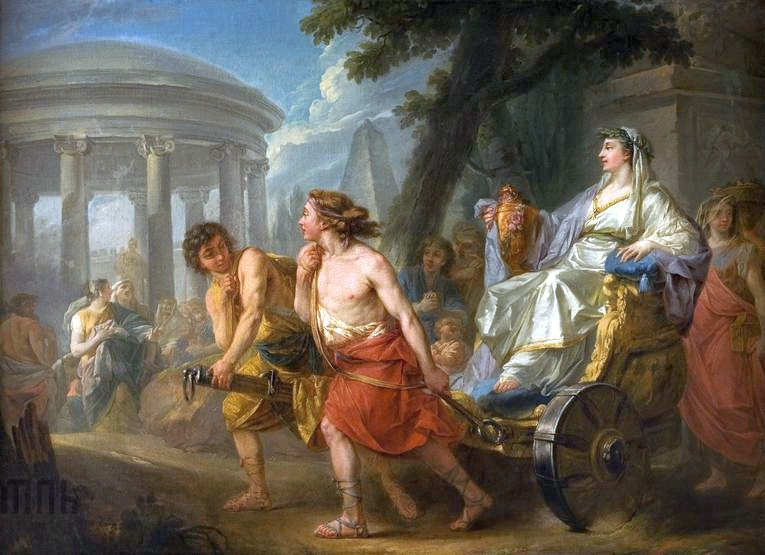
Cleobis and Biton, Jean Bardin

== See also ==
- National Museum in Kraków
- Museums in Poland
