= Adoration of the Christ Child (Lippi, Florence) =

Painting by Filippo Lippi

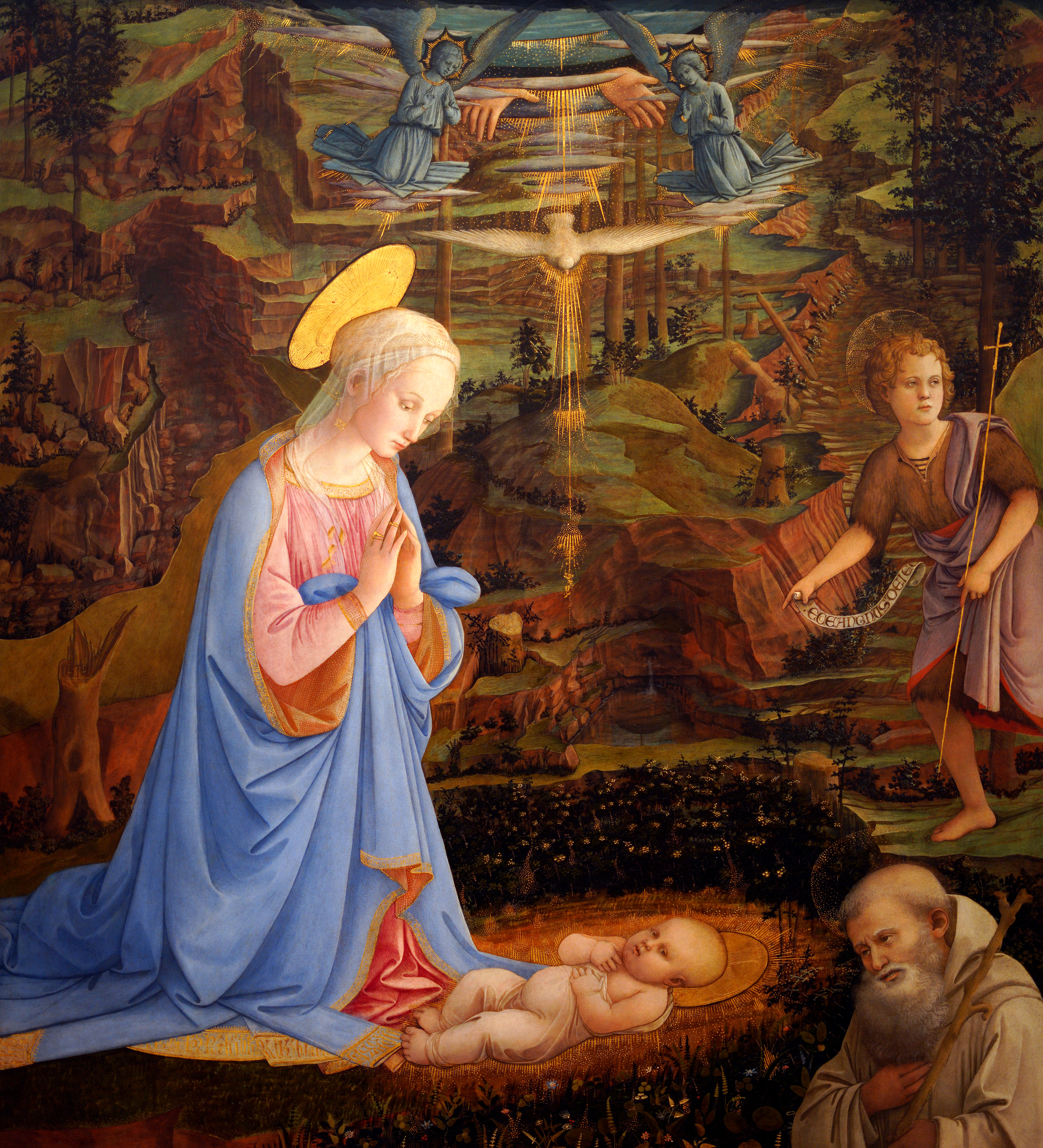
Adoration of the Christ Child (c. 1463) by Filippo Lippi

Adoration of the Christ Child is a tempera painting on panel of 1463 by Filippo Lippi, in the Uffizi since 1919. It was last restored in 2007 by Daniele Rossi. It was first attributed to Lippi by Pudelko, who argued it was produced early in the artist's career due to its references to Fra Angelico's style, but Bernard Berenson later argued that these references instead placed it in a more mature phase.

It is also known as the Camaldoli Adoration of the Christ Child, after the monastery of Camaldoli; according to the Lives of the Artists, it was commissioned by Lucrezia Tornabuoni for a cell there which had been rebuilt by her husband Piero the Gouty in 1463. On the right are the young Saint John the Baptist and Saint Romuald, the founder of the Camaldolese order.
