= Adoration of the Christ Child with Saint Jerome, Saint Mary Magdalene and Saint Eustace =

c. 1436 panel painting by Paolo Uccello

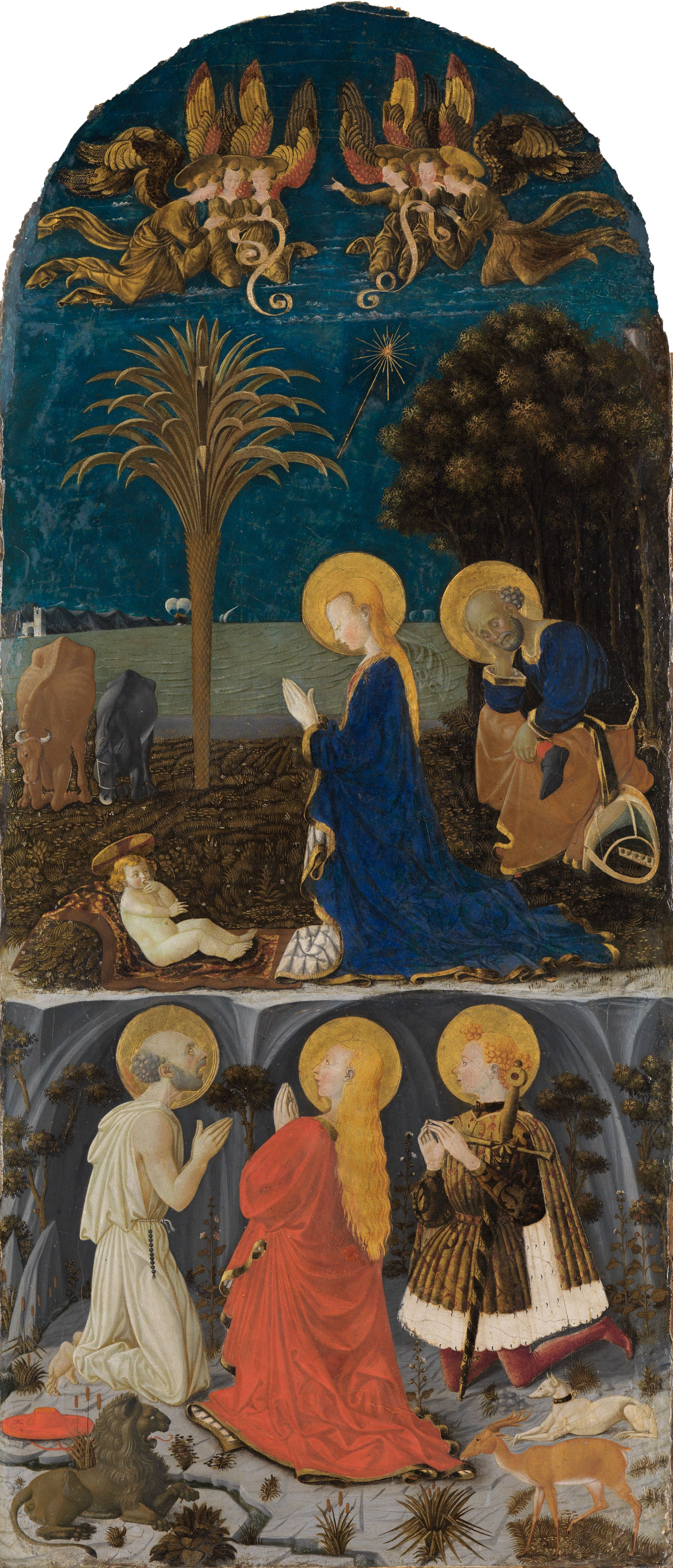
Adoration of the Christ Child with Saint Jerome, Saint Mary Magdalene and Saint Eustace (c. 1436) by Paolo Uccello

Adoration of the Christ Child with Saint Jerome, Saint Mary Magdalene and Saint Eustace is a c. 1436 tempera and gold on panel painting by Paolo Uccello. It is now in the Staatliche Kunsthalle in Karlsruhe. Its provenance is unknown, though it may have come from the church of Santi Girolamo e Eustachio in Bologna during the artist's stay in Emilia-Romagna.

Charles Loeser attributed it to Uccello in 1898, though Pudelkho instead attributed it to an unnamed painter he entitled the Master of Karlsruhe in 1395. The latter attribution was accepted by Carli in 1954 and Pope-Hennessy in 1950. Mario Salmi came up with a third attribution to a 'Master of Quarate' in 1934–1935. However, the attribution to Uccello was accepted by Roberto Longhi in 1928 and Alessandro Angelini in 1990, though they both date it differently. In 1974 Parronchi argued it was by an artist close to Uccello, possibly his daughter Antonia, a Carmelite nun and painter. Padoa Rizzo also argued in 1991 that it was by an artist that was close to Uccello.
