= Adoration of the Christ Child (Gentile da Fabriano) =

Painting by Gentile da Fabriano

Adoration of the Child
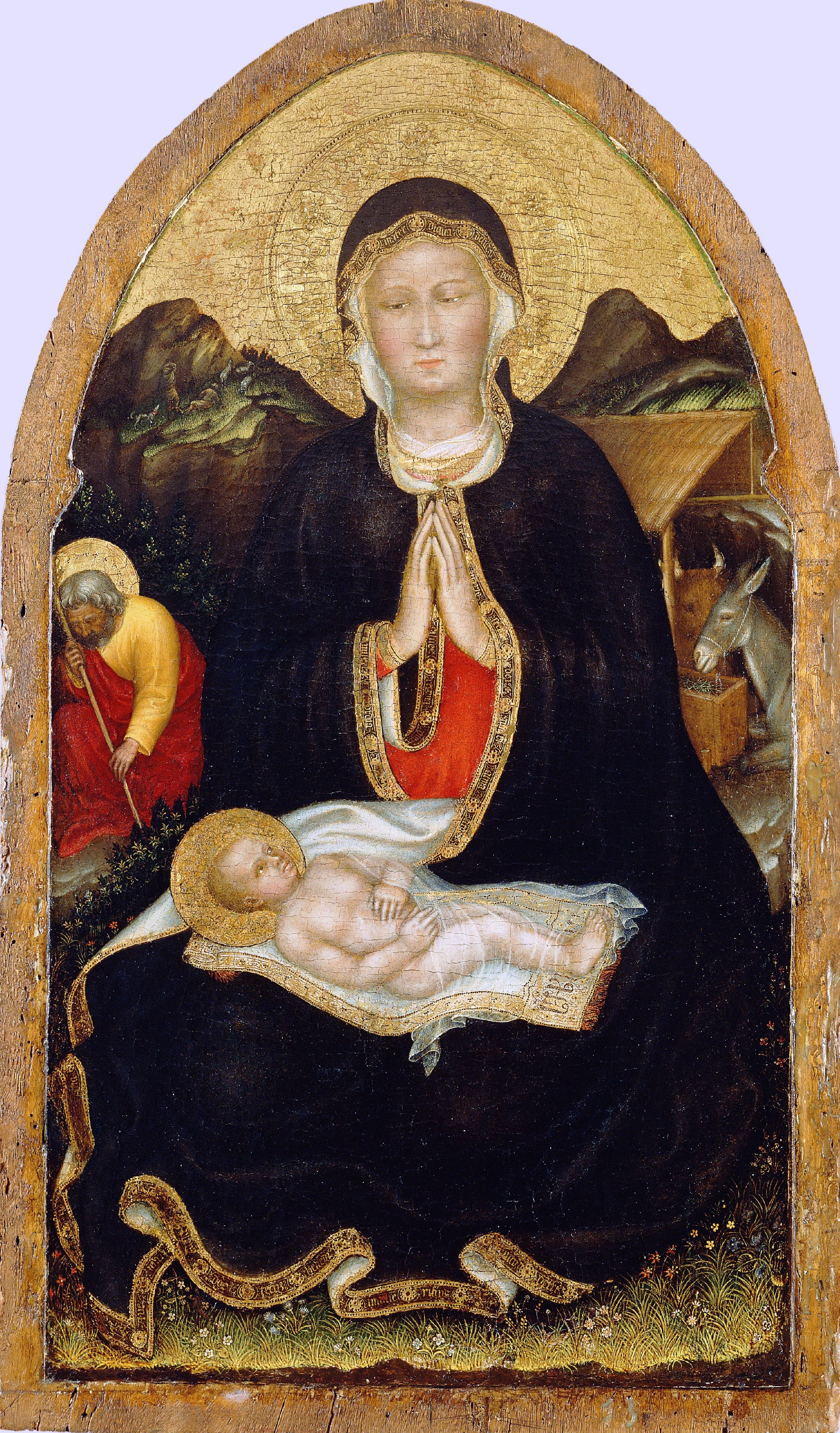
- Artist: Gentile da Fabriano
- Year: 1420–1421
- Type: Tempera and gold on panel
- Dimensions: 72 cm × 42.6 cm (28 in × 16.8 in)
- Location: Getty Center, Los Angeles

The Adoration of the Christ Child is a tempera and gold on panel painting by the Italian late medieval artist Gentile da Fabriano, dating from around 1420–1421 and housed in the Getty Center of Los Angeles, United States.

The work is generally dated from between Gentile's quick stay in his hometown, Fabriano, in the Spring of 1420, and his arrival to Florence in the following summer. There are indeed similarities with the female faces in the Adoration of the Magi, although the presence of copies by local followers in the Marche and Dalmatia could imply that the painting was at some location in the Adriatic Sea area.

== Description ==
The scene is a combination of the traditional iconography of the Nativity of Jesus in art and that of the Madonna of Humility, with Mary portrayed in the foreground while sitting on a lawn. In the background are also Joseph (left, sleeping in order to underline his marginal role in the birth of Jesus), the hut with the donkey and the ox and, farther behind, the annunciation to the shepherds.

The embroideries in Mary's cloak there are several inscriptions, reading: "Ave Mater Digna Dei Ven[...] Ben[...]", on the right edge "Salve Regina Mater Mis[ericordiae]", on the left edge "Ave Maris Ste[lla] Dei Mater Alma Atque [...]" and, on the lower edge, "Ave Maria Gratia Plena Do[minu]s Tecum Benedi[ctu in] Mulieribus".

Typical examples of Gentile's attention to detail are the lawn in the foreground and the rendering of the decoration of Jesus' sheet.

== Sources ==
- Minardi, Mauro (2005). Gentile da Fabriano. Milan: RCS.
