= Adoration of the Christ Child (Uccello) =

c. 1430s fresco by Paolo Uccello

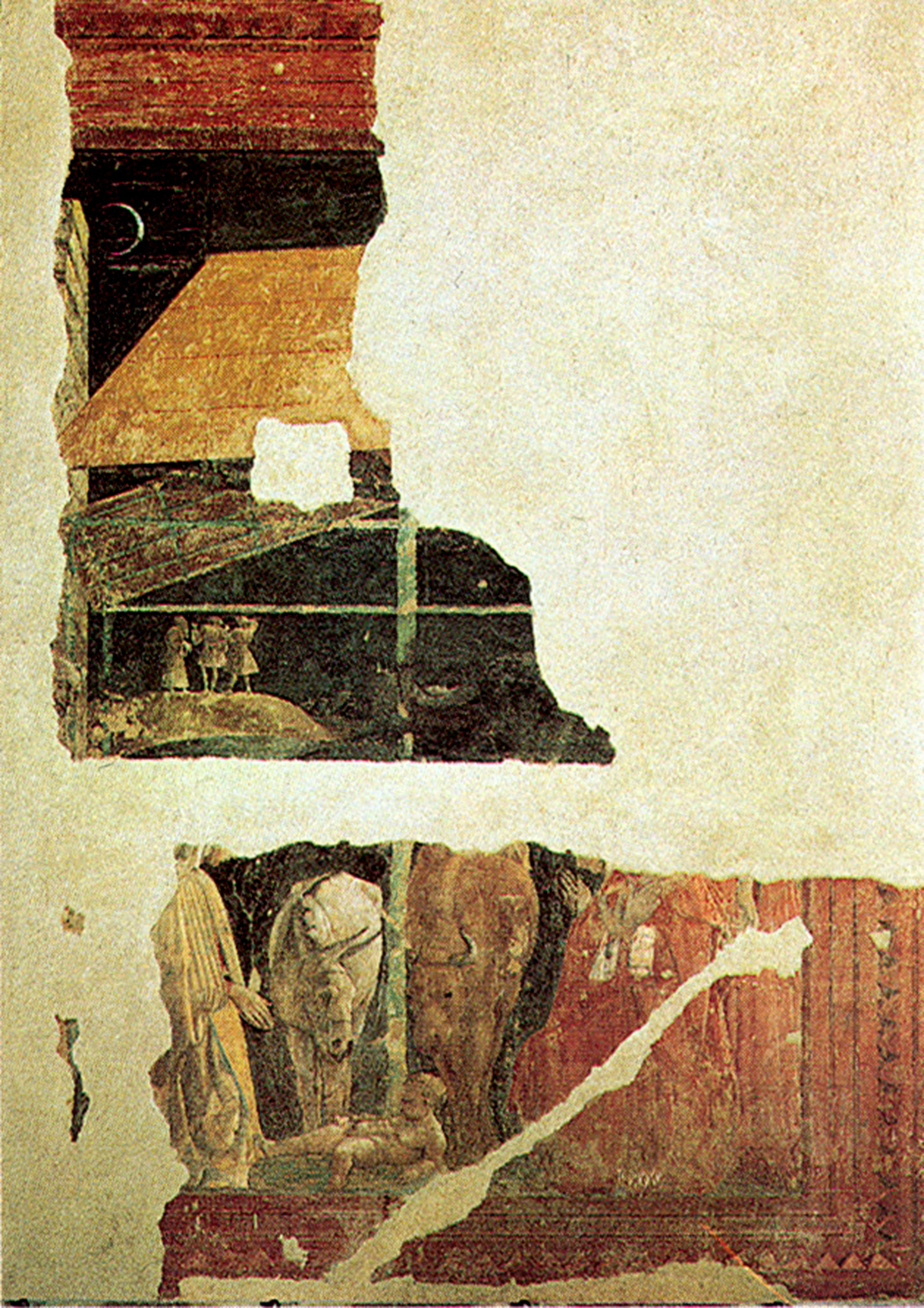
The two surviving fragments

Adoration of the Christ Child was a 1431 or 1437 fresco by Paolo Uccello – some of the members of the family which commissioned it are shown. It was originally painted on a wall in the sacristy of San Martino church in Bologna, but it was later hacked off that wall, meaning that only two fragments survive. These are now on show in the first chapel on the left on the north aisle of the church's nave. On one of the fragments is a date starting 143, though it is unclear if the final digit is a 1 or a 7.
