= Adoration of the Christ Child (Lippi, Prato) =

Painting by Filippo Lippi

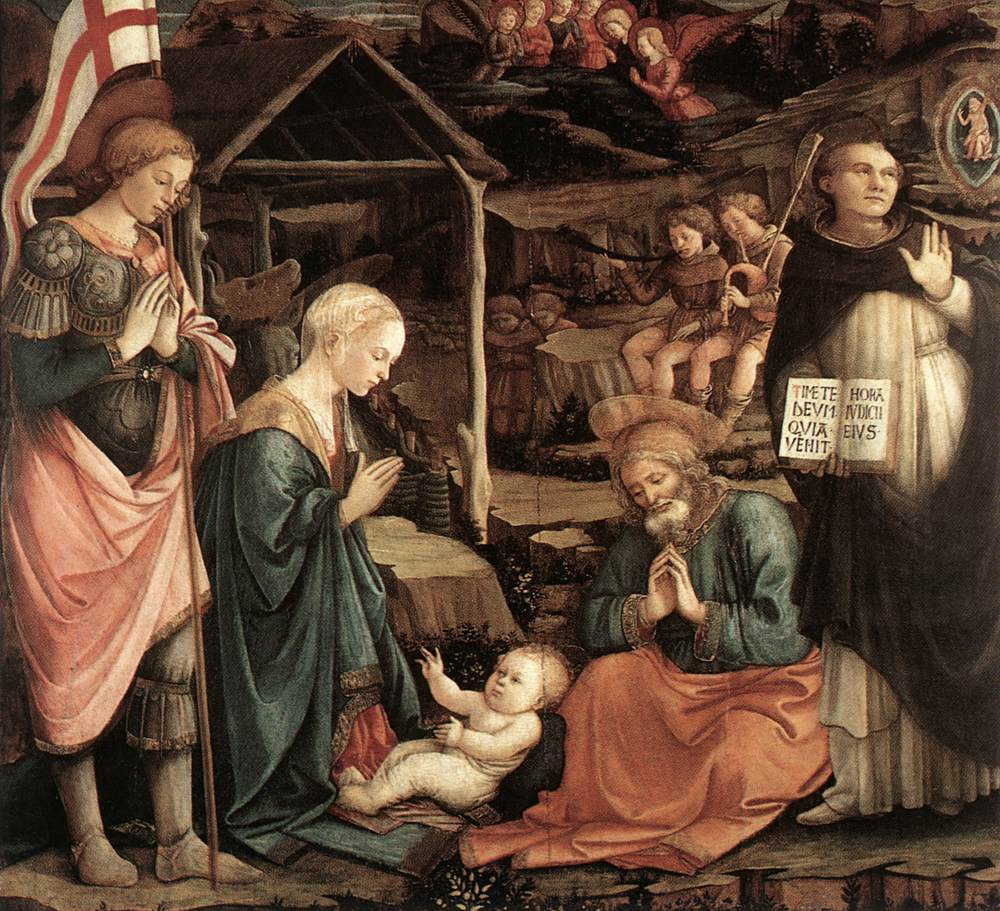
Adoration of the Christ Child (c. 1455–1466)

Adoration of the Christ Child is a tempera on panel altarpiece by Filippo Lippi, originally painted for the church of San Domenico in Prato and now in the city's Museo Civico. It is also known as Adoration of the Christ Child with St Vincent Ferrer or Nativity with St George and St Vincent Ferrer. It was painted between 1455 (the year of saint Vincent Ferrer's canonisation) and 1466 (the year the artist left Prato after fourteen years there). The work was probably damaged by a fire in the church in 1467, requiring some repairs which were discovered in a recent restoration of the work.

After his canonisation, Ferrer became an important model for Dominican culture as a symbol of the struggle against heresy - he is shown to the right of the work having a vision of the Virgin Mary in a mandorla. St Joseph, the Virgin Mary and Saint George are shown adoring the Christ Child, with two shepherds and a number of angels in the background.

== History ==
The artist often painted this subject during his mature period and produced several variants of it during his time in Prato. The composition, general underdrawing and the painted figures of the Virgin, Christ and St Vincent are by the master, whilst other large areas of the work were painted by his studio assistants, particularly Fra Diamante. Some attribute the figure of St Joseph to Filippino and/or Botticelli. As with Lippi's Madonna della Cintola, the work was produced in phases one year after another.
