= Nativity (Lotto) =

1523 painting by Lorenzo Lotto

- The Nativity (1939.1.288)
- Year: 1523
- Medium: oil paint, panel
- Dimensions: 46 cm (18 in) × 35.9 cm (14.1 in)
- Location: National Gallery of Art, United States
- Collection: Samuel H. Kress Collection
- Accession no.: 1939.1.288

The Nativity or the Adoration of the Christ Child is an oil-on-panel painting executed in 1523 by the Venetian painter Lorenzo Lotto and signed on the painted pieces of wood at the bottom right "L. Lotus / 1523". It is now in the National Gallery of Art in Washington DC.

The painting was produced for private devotion. X-ray examination has shown that the left side was reworked by Lotto himself.

The subject is more correctly called the Adoration of the Christ Child as only the baby Jesus and his two parents are shown, rather than the fuller cast of most examples of the Nativity of Jesus in art, but the museum has chosen to use The Nativity. The Adoration of the Christ Child was a common subject from the late Middle Ages on, influenced by devotional writers. There is an anachronistic crucifix on the wall at left, a rather unusual feature.

By the 20th century it was in Count Morlani's private collection in Bergamo. He sold it to Bononi in Milan, where it was acquired by Alessandro Contini-Bonacossi. In 1937 Samuel H. Kress acquired it and took it to New York, giving it to its present owner two years later.
