= Adoration of the Christ Child (Lotto, Kraków) =

1508 painting by Lorenzo Lotto

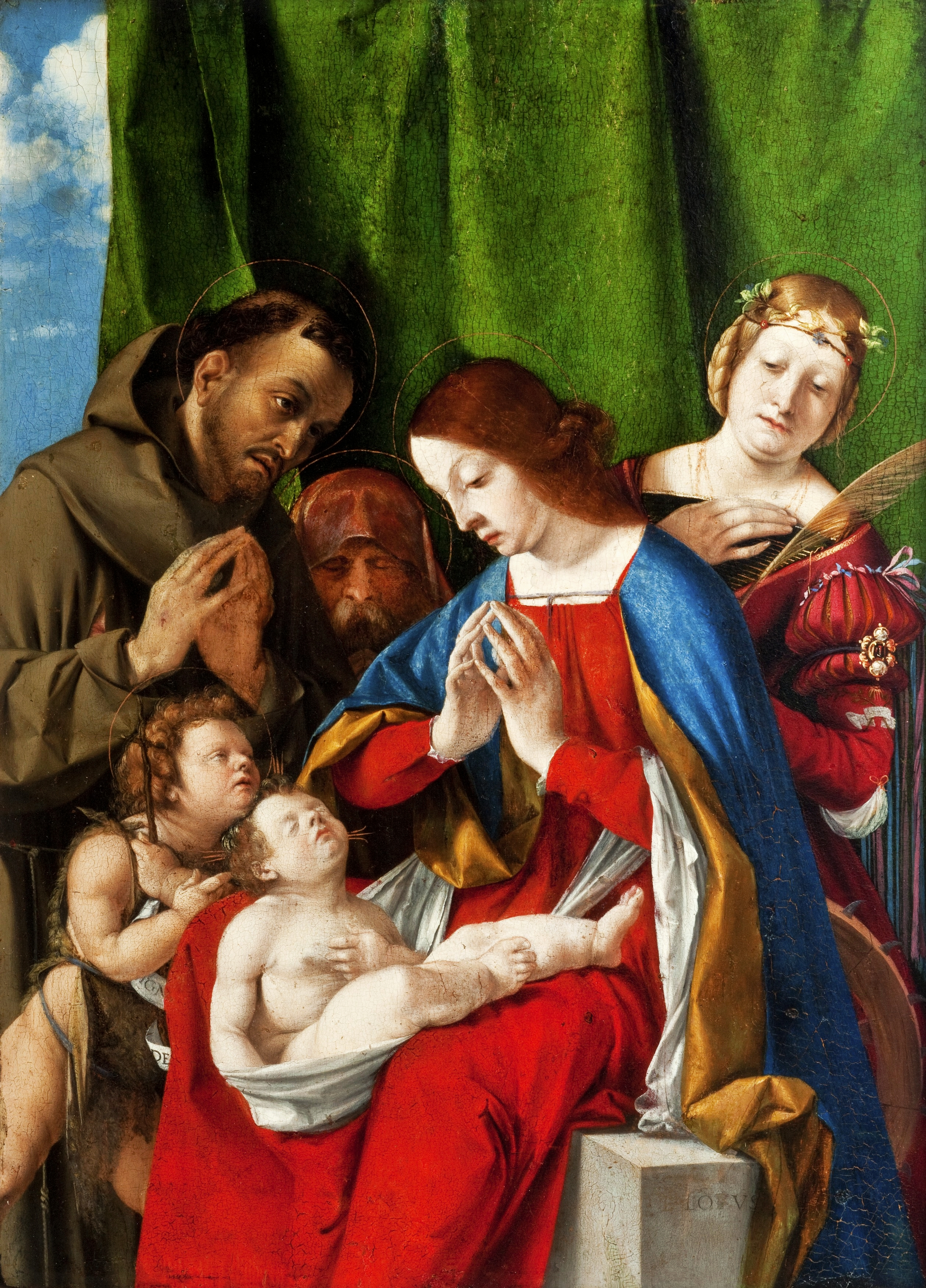
Adoration of the Christ Child (1508) by Lorenzo Lotto

Adoration of the Christ Child is a 1508 tempera painting on poplar panel by Lorenzo Lotto, owned by and exhibited at the EUROPEUM – European Culture Centre, a branch of the National Museum in Kraków, Poland. To the left of the Madonna and Child is Francis of Assisi, in the centre background is an aged saint (Saint Jerome or Saint Joseph) and to the right is a female martyr, possibly Catherine of Alexandria.

In the 17th century it was in the collection of Gaspara de Haro y Guzman (1629–1687), Spanish ambassador to Rome and viceroy of Naples, one of the greatest collectors of the era, as shown by his mark on the reverse of the image. In 1804 it was bought in Naples for 100 ducats by Jan Feliks Tarnowski, who in 1834 gave it to Janowi Karolowi Scipio del Campo, his nephew and a canon of the chapter of Kraków.

It was included in Bernard Berenson's 1901 monograph on the artist. It was bought by Zygmunt Pusłowski at the start of the 20th century and its next owner after him was Xawery Pusłowski, who later gave it to his godfather Marek Rostworowski. It was sold by Rostworowski in 1971 to its present owner.
