= Northampton Area Public Library =

- 40°41′13″N 75°29′30″W
- Location: 1615 Laubach Avenue, Northampton, Pennsylvania, U.S.
- Established: 1965

Access and use
- Members: 10

Other information
- Budget: $125,000,000
- Director: Beth Krempa
- Employees: 19
- Website: www.northamptonapl.org

Northampton Area Public Library is a library located in Northampton, Pennsylvania. It serves the residents of the Northampton Area School District. The library was established in 1965.

== History ==
=== 20th century ===
The first public library in Northampton, Pennsylvania opened on August 23, 1965, and was located in the bay at the north end of the Northampton Memorial Community Center. At the end of 1966, it was determined that the library location was inadequate for the public needs and a building fund was established by George A. Eichler.

In October 1971, Mr. and Mrs. George H. Schisler announced that they would provide $125,000.00 for the construction of the library's building. Mr. Jay Ferreira of Bond and Miller, Associates was selected to be the architect for the building. In October 1971, Northampton deeded the land, located on Laubach Avenue, for the new building. On April 17, 1972, the charter of incorporation was issued. The charter lists it as a nonprofit corporation, which can accept tax deductible monetary gifts.

The library serves the boroughs of Northampton, Bath, and Chapman, and the townships of Allen, East Allen, Lehigh, and Moore, each located in Northampton County, Pennsylvania.

On September 30, 1973, the George H. Schisler Building of the Northampton Area Public Library, Inc., was dedicated in honor of Mr. and Mrs. George H. Schisler.

== See also ==
- Blue Mountain Community Library in Pen Argyl, Pennsylvania
- Easton Area Public Library in Easton, Pennsylvania
- Mary Meuser Memorial Library in Wilson, Pennsylvania
- Memorial Library of Nazareth & Vicinity in Nazareth, Pennsylvania
