= Beersville, Pennsylvania =

Unincorporated community in Pennsylvania, US

- Unincorporated community
- Location within Pennsylvania
- Country: United States
- State: Pennsylvania
- County: Northampton
- Elevation: 525 ft (160 m)

Population
  - Metro: 865,310 (US: 68th)
- Time zone: UTC-5 (Eastern (EST))
  - Summer (DST): UTC-4 (EDT)
- Area codes: 610 and 484
- GNIS feature ID: 1169127

Beersville, originally known as Falmers, is an exurban unincorporated village in southwestern Moore Township, Pennsylvania near the Lehigh Township line on Route 248. It is part of the Lehigh Valley metropolitan area, which had a population of 861,899 and which was thus the 68th-most populous metropolitan area in the U.S. as of the 2020 census.

== History ==
The village appears on an 1830 map identified as Falmers. The Beers family settled here sometime in the 1800s, so the name is believed to be derived from them. Henry's 1850 history identifies the village as Bears Tavern and an 1870 county atlas refers to it as Bursville Hotel, possibly a typographical error.

The area around the village is drained by the Hokendauqua Creek, which flows into the Lehigh River. The village and surrounding community are served by the Northampton Area School District. Despite the name, there has been no place selling alcoholic beverages in the village since the Beersville Hotel burned down in 1985.

The village is split between the Bath and Northampton post offices, which use the Zip Codes of 18014 and 18067, respectively.
