= Moore Township, Pennsylvania =

Borough in Pennsylvania, US

Moore Township
- Township
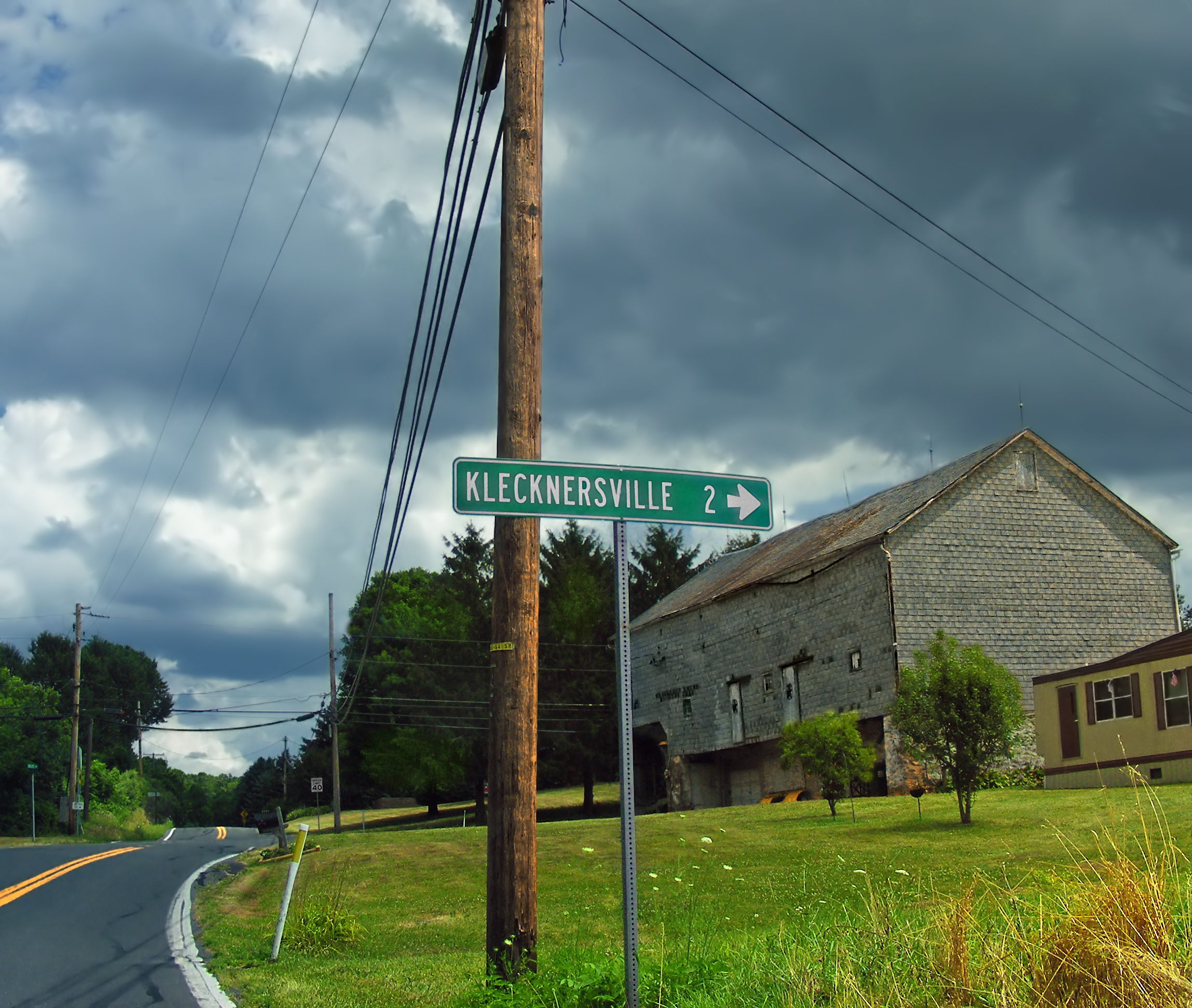
- Klecknersville in Moore Township in July 2010

- Seal

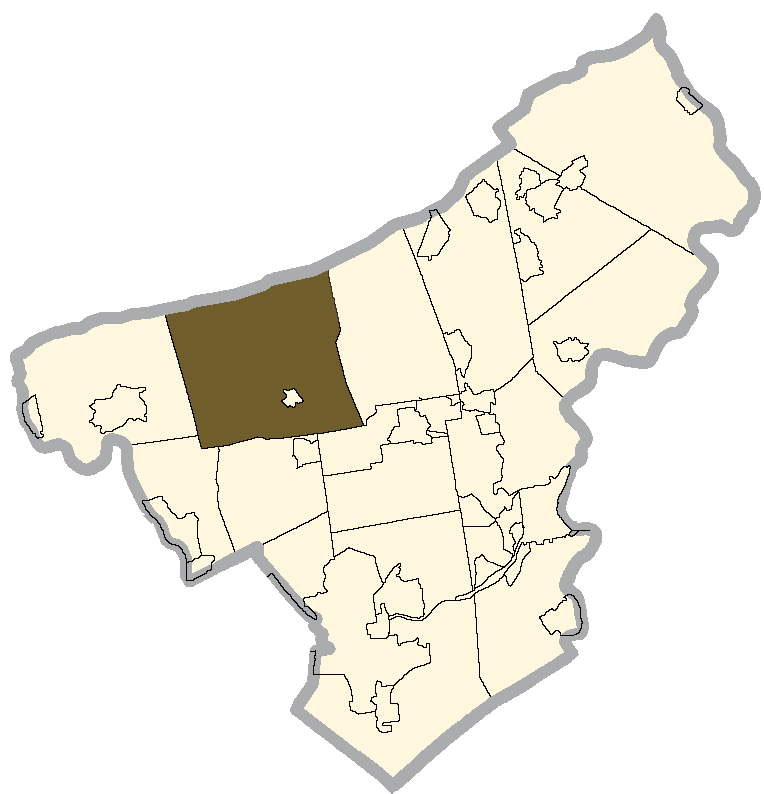
- Map of Northampton County with Moore Township highlighted
- Coordinates: 40°45′N 75°25′W
- Country: United States
- State: Pennsylvania
- County: Northampton

Area
  - Township: 37.58 sq mi (97.33 km^{2})
  - Land: 37.19 sq mi (96.32 km^{2})
  - Water: 0.39 sq mi (1.00 km^{2})
- Elevation: 650 ft (200 m)

Population (2010)
  - Township: 9,198
  - Estimate (2016): 9,282
  - Density: 249.6/sq mi (96.36/km^{2})
  - Metro: 865,310 (US: 68th)
- Time zone: UTC-5 (EST)
  - Summer (DST): UTC-4 (EDT)
- Area code: 610
- FIPS code: 42-095-50824
- Primary airport: Lehigh Valley International Airport
- Major hospital: Lehigh Valley Hospital–Cedar Crest
- School district: Northampton Area
- Website: mooretownship.org

Moore Township is a township in Northampton County, Pennsylvania, United States. The population of Moore Township was 9,198 at the 2010 census. The township is located in the Lehigh Valley, which had a population of 861,899 and was the 68th-most populous metropolitan area in the U.S. as of the 2020 census.

== Geography ==
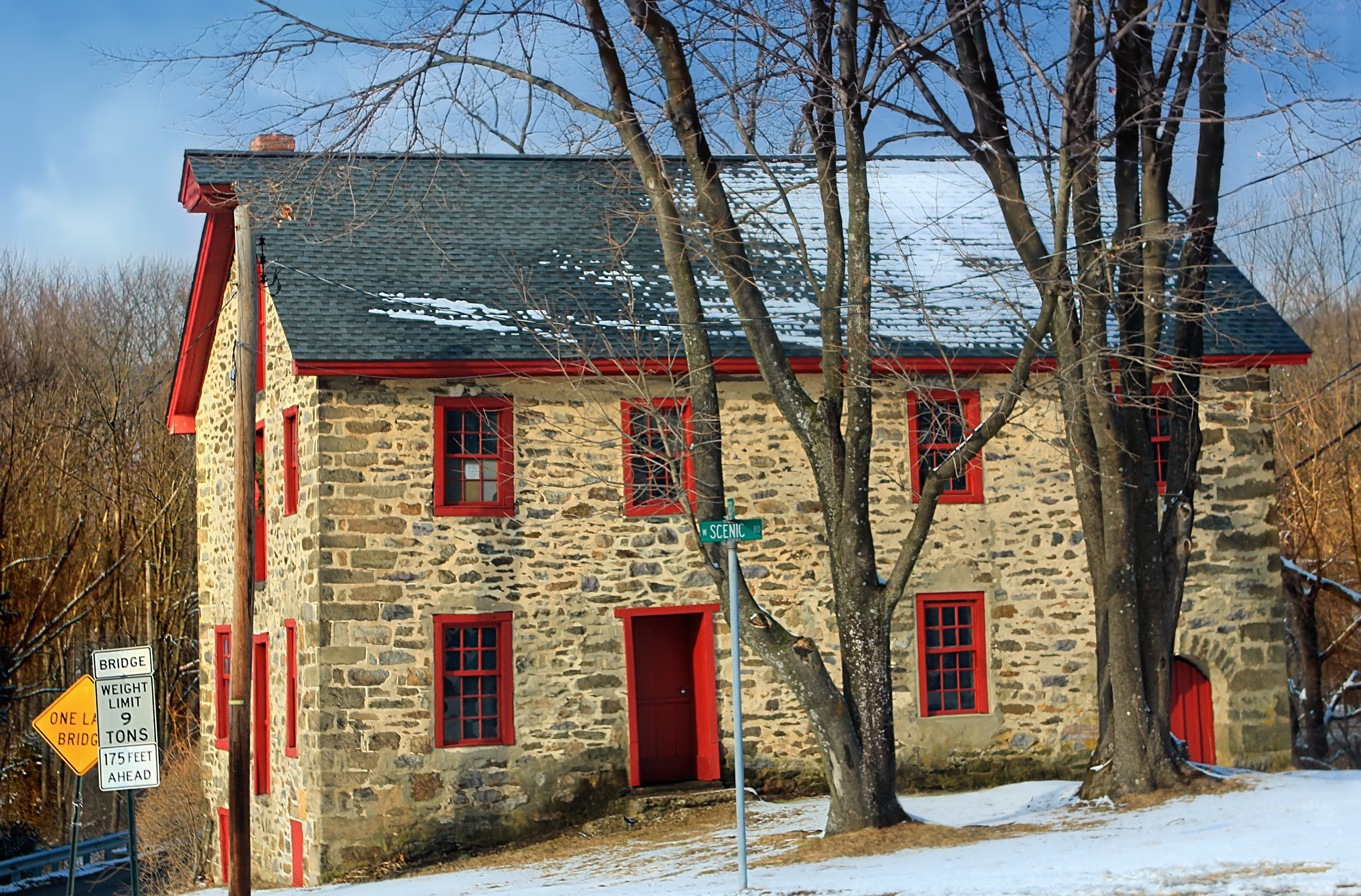
A restored farmhouse in Moore Township in February 2013

According to the U.S. Census Bureau, the township has a total area of 37.5 square miles (97 km^{2}), of which 37.5 square miles (97 km^{2}) is land and 0.04 square miles (0.10 km^{2}), or 0.08%, is water. Geophysically, it is located within the great bend of the lower Lehigh River mouth region north of Allentown, north-northwest of Bethlehem, and west of Easton on the mouth of the Lehigh River.

Moore Township drains into the Delaware River through Catasauqua, Monocacy, and Hokendauqua creeks, each of which originate in the township and are tributaries of the Lehigh River, and by the south and east draining Bushkill Creek tributary of the Delaware River. Its landscapes compose the foothills south of its natural northern boundary, which is the over 150 miles (240 km)-long Blue Mountain barrier ridge.

Its ten villages are Beersville, Copella, Dannersville, Delps, Emanuelsville, Jamesville, Klecknersville, Moorestown, Point Phillip, and Youngsville.

=== Neighboring municipalities ===
- Lehigh Township (west)
- Allen Township (southwest)
- East Allen Township (south)
- Upper Nazareth Township (southeast)
- Bushkill Township (east)
- Ross Township, Monroe County (northeast)
- Eldred Township, Monroe County (north)
- Lower Towamensing Township, Carbon County (northwest)

Moore Township surrounds the borough of Chapman.

== Demographics ==
Historical population
Census	Pop.	Note	%±
2000	8,673		—
2010	9,198		6.1%
2016 (est.)	9,282		0.9%
U.S. Decennial Census

As of the census of 2000, there were 8,673 people, 3,303 households, and 2,559 families residing in the township. The population density was 231.5 inhabitants per square mile (89.4/km^{2}). There were 3,464 housing units at an average density of 92.5 per square mile (35.7/km^{2}). The racial makeup of the township was 98.80% White, 0.36% African American, 0.05% Native American, 0.21% Asian, 0.03% Pacific Islander, 0.22% from other races, and 0.33% from two or more races. Hispanic or Latino of any race were 1.01% of the population.

There were 3,303 households, out of which 30.3% had children under the age of 18 living with them, 68.1% were married couples living together, 6.1% had a female householder with no husband present, and 22.5% were non-families. 18.3% of all households were made up of individuals, and 8.5% had someone living alone who was 65 years of age or older. The average household size was 2.62 and the average family size was 2.97.

In the township, the population was spread out, with 22.1% under the age of 18, 6.5% from 18 to 24, 28.4% from 25 to 44, 29.3% from 45 to 64, and 13.7% who were 65 years of age or older. The median age was 41 years. For every 100 females, there were 103.2 males. For every 100 females age 18 and over, there were 101.9 males.

The median income for a household in the township was $48,371, and the median income for a family was $54,663. Males had a median income of $38,098 versus $25,241 for females. The per capita income for the township was $21,829. About 3.5% of families and 4.0% of the population were below the poverty line, including 4.0% of those under age 18 and 5.5% of those age 65 or over.

== Transportation ==
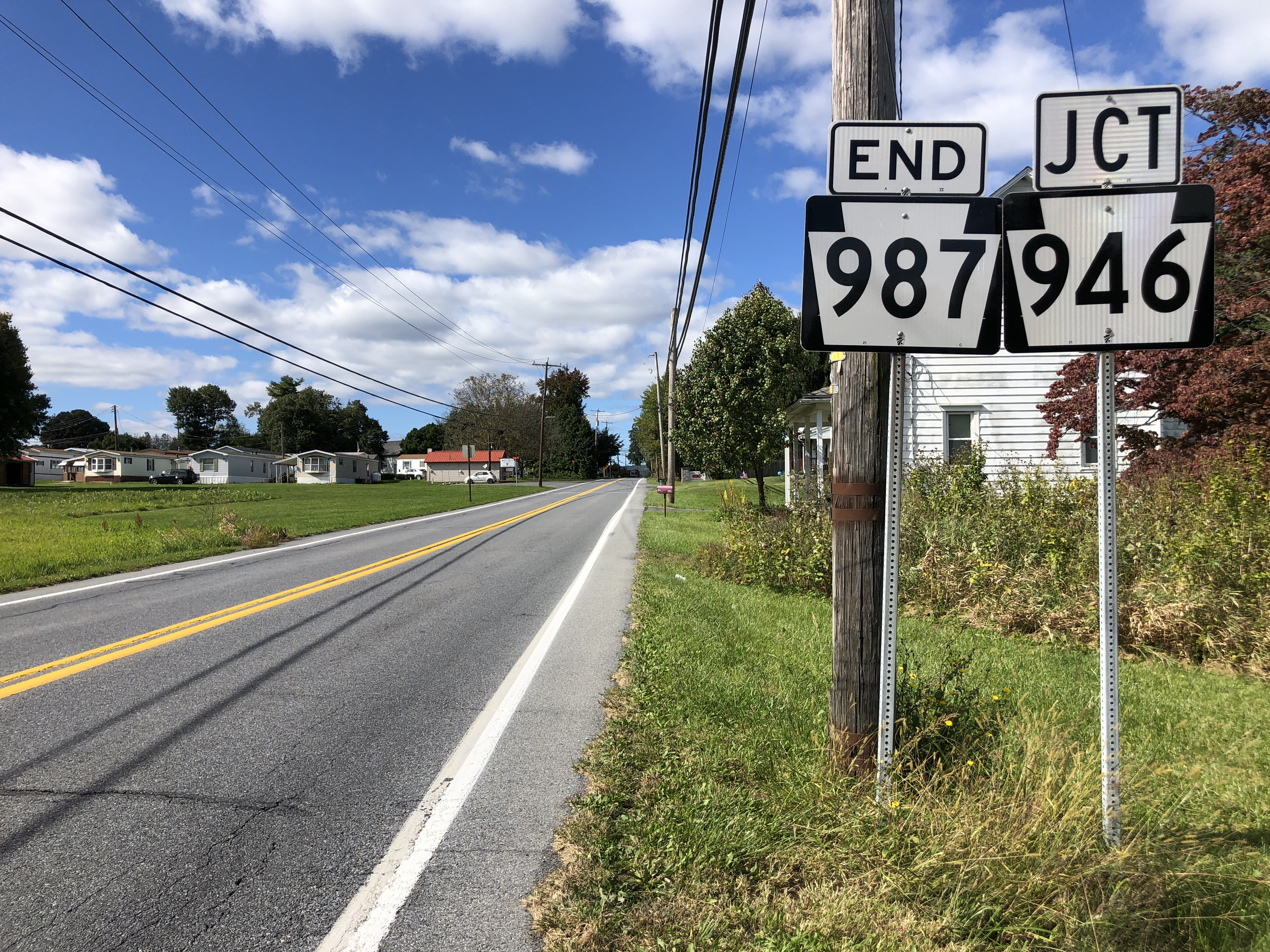
PA Route 987 approaching PA Route 946 near the center of Moore Township

As of 2015, there were 147.98 miles (238.15 km) of public roads in Moore Township, of which 48.63 miles (78.26 km) were maintained by the Pennsylvania Department of Transportation (PennDOT) and 99.35 miles (159.89 km) were maintained by the township.

Moore Township's numbered roads are east-to-west PA Route 248 and PA Route 946 and north-to-south PA Route 512 and PA Route 987. Other notable local roads include Dannersville Road, Delps Road, Scenic Drive, and Valley View Drive.

== Education ==
The township is served by the Northampton Area School District. Students in grades nine through 12 attend Northampton Area High School in Northampton.
