= Allen Township, Northampton County, Pennsylvania =

Township in Pennsylvania, US

Allen
- Township
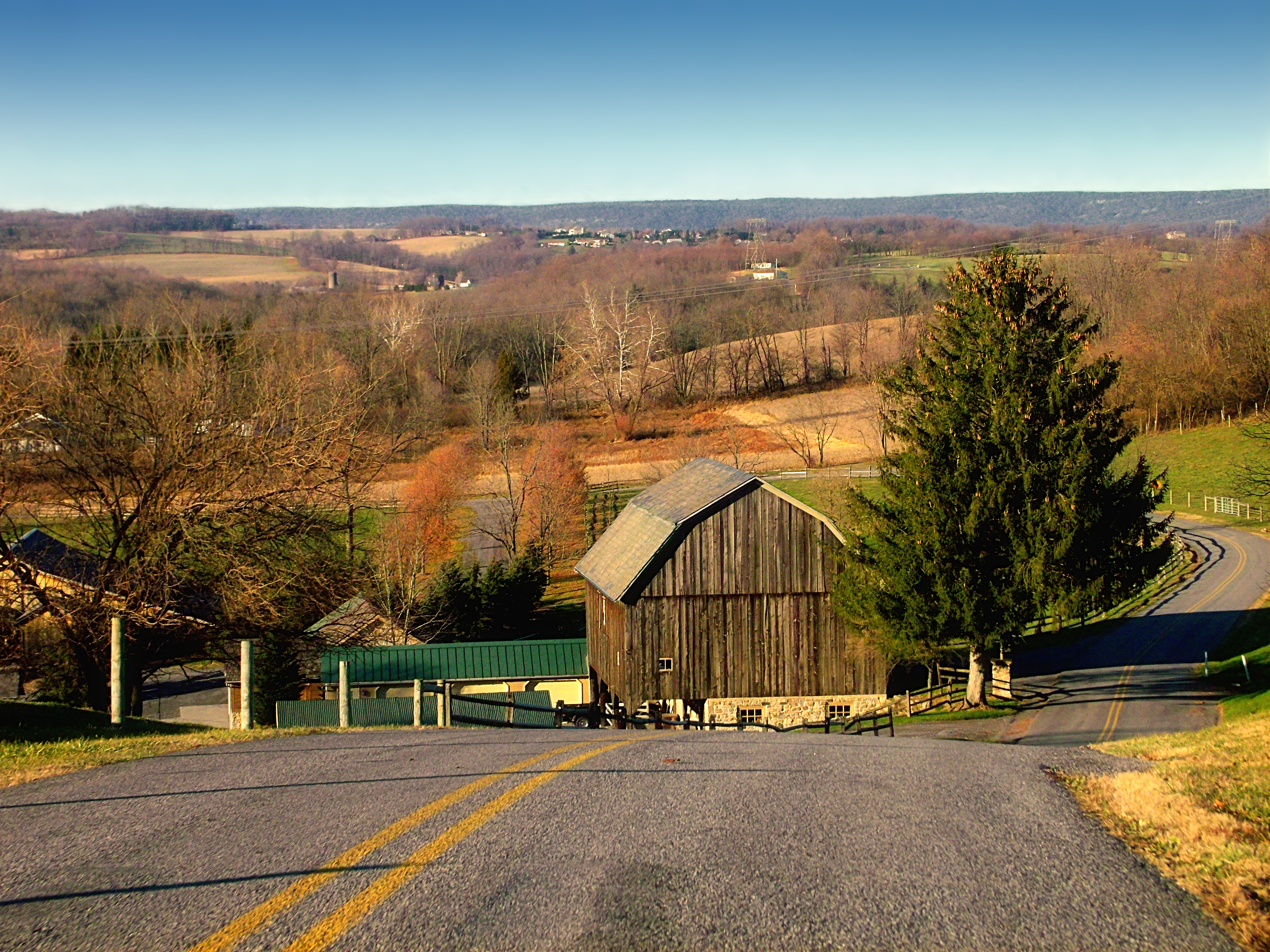
- Allen Township in November 2011

- Seal

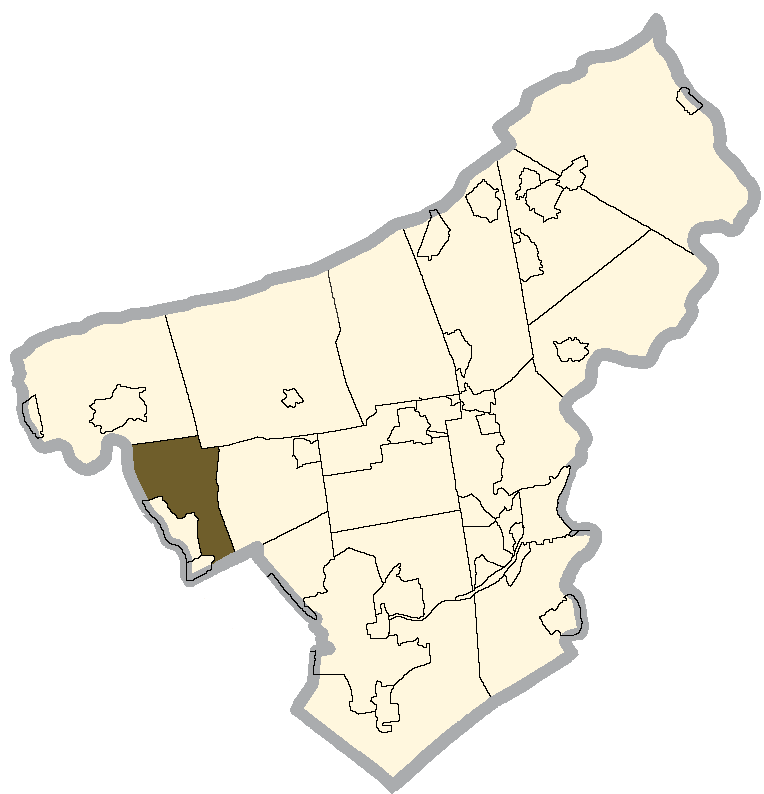
- Location of Allen Township in Northampton County, Pennsylvania

- Location of Allen Township in Pennsylvania
- Coordinates: 40°42′30″N 75°30′00″W
- Country: United States
- State: Pennsylvania
- County: Northampton

Area
  - Township: 11.14 sq mi (28.86 km^{2})
  - Land: 10.84 sq mi (28.08 km^{2})
  - Water: 0.30 sq mi (0.78 km^{2})
- Elevation: 410 ft (120 m)

Population (2020)
  - Township: 5,462
  - Estimate (2023): 5,451
  - Density: 448.2/sq mi (173.05/km^{2})
  - Metro: 865,310 (US: 68th)
- Time zone: UTC-5 (EST)
  - Summer (DST): UTC-4 (EDT)
- Area code: 610
- FIPS code: 42-095-00948
- Primary airport: Lehigh Valley International Airport
- Major hospital: Lehigh Valley Hospital–Cedar Crest
- School district: Northampton Area
- Website: www.allentownship.org

Allen Township is a township in Northampton County, Pennsylvania, United States. The population of Allen Township was 5,462 at the 2020 census. Allen Township is part of the Lehigh Valley metropolitan area, which had a population of 861,899 and was the 68th-most populous metropolitan area in the U.S. as of the 2020 census.

== History ==
Kreidersville Covered Bridge, built in 1839, was added to the National Register of Historic Places in 1980.

== Geography ==
According to the U.S. Census Bureau, the township has a total area of 11.2 square miles (29 km^{2}), 11.1 square miles (29 km^{2}) of which is land and 0.1 square miles (0.26 km^{2}) (0.63%) of which is water. It is drained by the Lehigh River, via the Catasauqua Creek, which separates it from Lehigh County. Its four villages are Howertown, Kreidersville, Seemsville, and Weaversville.

=== Neighboring municipalities ===
- Lehigh Township (north)
- Moore Township (northeast)
- East Allen Township (east)
- Hanover Township, Lehigh County (south)
- Catasauqua, Lehigh County (tangent to the south)
- North Catasauqua (southwest)
- Northampton (west)
- Whitehall Township, Lehigh County (tangent to the west)
- North Whitehall Township, Lehigh County (west)

== Transportation ==
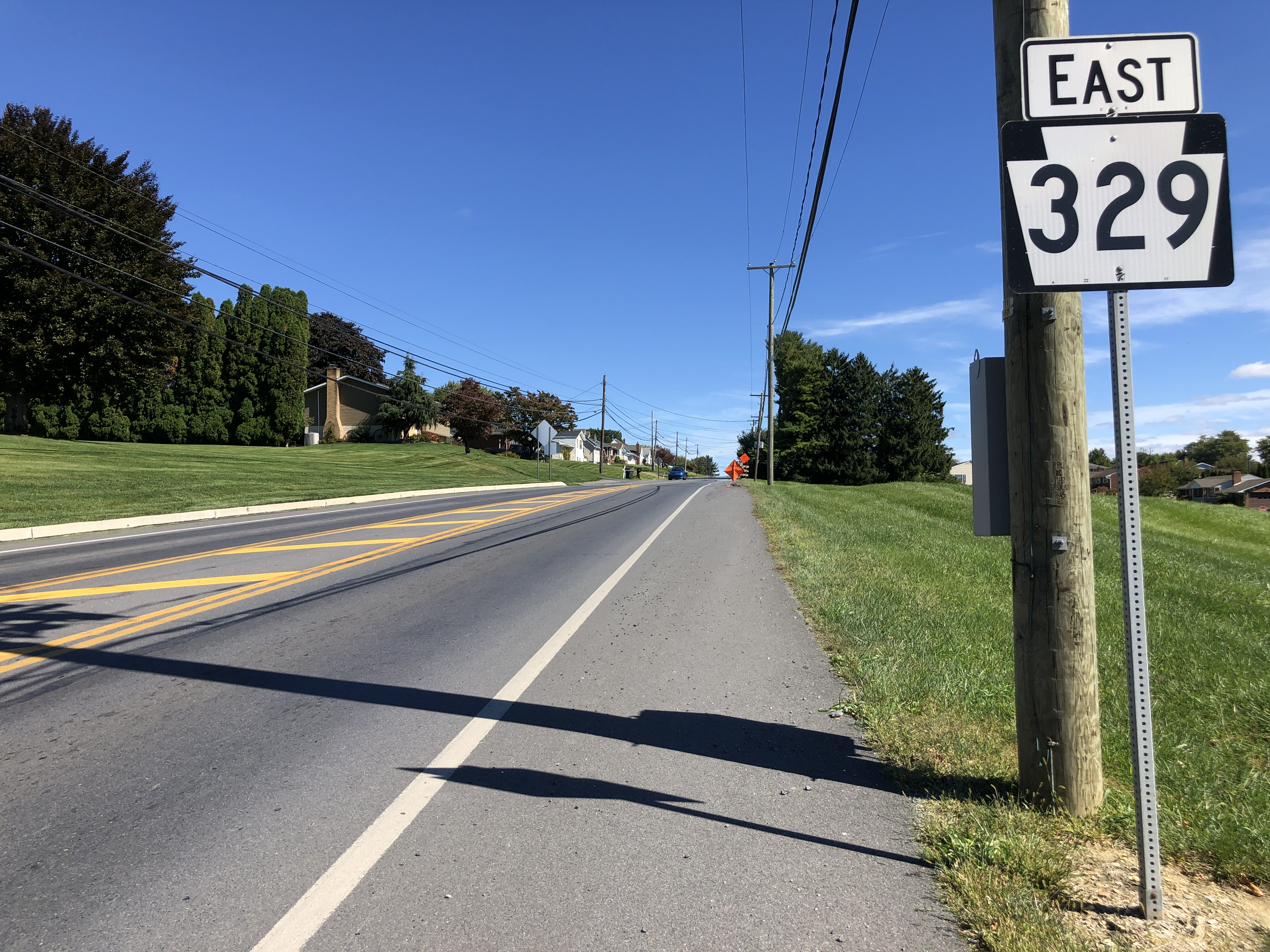
PA Route 329 eastbound in Allen Township

As of 2022, there were 42.35 miles (68.16 km) of public roads in Allen Township, of which 14.35 miles (23.09 km) were maintained by the Pennsylvania Department of Transportation (PennDOT) and 28.00 miles (45.06 km) were maintained by the township.

Pennsylvania Route 329 is the only numbered highway traversing Allen Township. It follows an east–west alignment through the central portion of the township. Other local roads of note include Bullshead Road, Cherryville Road, Howertown Road/Weaversville Road, Indian Trail Road, Kreidersville Road, Old Carriage Road, Seemsville Road, and Willowbrook Road.

== Demographics ==
Historical population
Census	Pop.	Note	%±
2000	2,630		—
2010	4,269		62.3%
2020	5,462		27.9%
2023 (est.)	5,451		−0.2%
U.S. Decennial Census

As of the 2000 census, there were 2,630 people, 1,001 households, and 805 families residing in the township. The population density was 237.1 inhabitants per square mile (91.5/km^{2}). There were 1,030 housing units at an average density of 92.9 per square mile (35.9/km^{2}). The racial makeup of the township was 98.67% White, 0.19% African American, 0.08% Native American, 0.08% Asian, 0.04% Pacific Islander, 0.42% from other races, and 0.53% from two or more races. Hispanic or Latino of any race were 1.10% of the population.

There were 1,001 households, out of which 31.2% had children under the age of 18 living with them, 70.7% were married couples living together, 5.6% had a female householder with no husband present, and 19.5% were non-families. 14.7% of all households were made up of individuals, and 5.7% had someone living alone who was 65 years of age or older. The average household size was 2.63 and the average family size was 2.91.

In the township, the population was spread out, with 21.7% under the age of 18, 6.3% from 18 to 24, 27.5% from 25 to 44, 31.2% from 45 to 64, and 13.3% who were 65 years of age or older. The median age was 42 years. For every 100 females, there were 97.4 males. For every 100 females age 18 and over, there were 98.3 males.

The median income for a household in the township was $54,464, and the median income for a family was $59,702. Males had a median income of $41,219 versus $27,930 for females. The per capita income for the township was $23,859. About 1.1% of families and 1.7% of the population were below the poverty line, including 1.6% of those under age 18 and 1.4% of those age 65 or over.

== Education ==
Allen Township is served by the Northampton Area School District. Students in grades nine through 12 attend Northampton Area High School in Northampton.

== Notable people ==
- Henry Clay Longnecker, former U.S. Representative
- John Rosbrugh, Presbyterian minister killed in the Second Battle of Trenton known as the "clerical martyr of the Revolutionary War"
- George Wolf, seventh governor of Pennsylvania
