= Dennis Onkotz =

American football player (born 1948)

No. 35
- Position: Linebacker

Personal information
- Born: February 6, 1948 (age 78); Northampton, Pennsylvania, U.S.
- Listed height: 6 ft 1 in (1.85 m)
- Listed weight: 220 lb (100 kg)

Career information
- College: Penn State
- NFL draft: 1970: 3rd round, 72nd overall pick

Career history
- New York Jets (1970)

Awards and highlights
- 2× Consensus All-American (1968, 1969); 3× First-team All-East (1967–1969)
- Stats at Pro Football Reference
- College Football Hall of Fame

Dennis Henry Onkotz (born February 6, 1948) is an American former professional football player who was a linebacker for the New York Jets of the National Football League (NFL). He played college football for the Penn State Nittany Lions, twice earning consensus All-American honors. He suffered a career ending injury during his first and only season with the Jets.

== Early life ==
Onkotz was born on February 6, 1948, in Northampton, Pennsylvania. He attended Northampton Area High School where he was a top player on the football, baseball and basketball teams. He graduated in 1966, as a member of the National Honor Society. In football, Onkotz led the Lehigh Valley League in scoring in 1965, and was All-League. In basketball, from 1963-66 he scored over 1,000 points.

In 1966, Onkotz was honored by the Lehigh Valley Chapter of the National Football Foundation and Hall of Fame as a scholar-athlete. In 1989, he was inducted into the Lehigh Valley Football Hall of Fame, at the Thanksgiving Day high school football game between Northampton and Catasauqua. In 2006, he was inducted into the Northampton Area School District Athletic Hall of Fame.

== College career ==
Onkotz attended Pennsylvania State University (Penn State). He was named a consensus or unanimous All-American at linebacker in 1968 and 1969. Onkotz was the only player to be on United Press International's (UPI) All-America team both years. He was a second-team All-American as a sophomore in 1967. An all-around athlete, Onkotz helped earn Penn State the nickname "Linebacker U," as the first great linebacker in the school tradition; but thanks to his speed he also held the unlikely position of punt returner, with an impressive average of over 13 yards per return.

Future NFL Hall of Fame linebacker, and Penn State teammate, Jack Ham said "'[Linebacker U] started with Dennis Onkotz.'" His coach described him as very intelligent, being seldom out of position and rarely missing an assignment.

Onkotz led the team in tackles in 1968 and 1969. As of 2024, he ranks first in school history for interceptions by a linebacker with 11, with only five defensive backs ahead of him in total interceptions. Onkotz amassed 287 tackles, which at one time ranked third on the Lions' career list (but as of 2024 is just outside of the top five). His 11 interceptions are tied for eighth in school history. His three interception returns for touchdowns are a Penn State career record (since tied). He also had two touchdowns on punt returns.

In three seasons, he helped the Lions to a 30–2–1 record and three bowl games, including two Orange Bowl wins. Onkotz made the 1969 Academic All-America team and was also selected to play in the 1970 Hula Bowl. During the two Orange Bowl seasons (1968-69), Penn State was 11–0 each year. The Associated Press ranked Penn State second in the nation both years.

In 1995, he was inducted into the College Football Hall of Fame.

== NFL career ==
Onkotz was selected 72nd overall in the third round of the 1970 NFL draft by the New York Jets. However, during a goal line stand on defense against the Los Angeles Rams in his rookie season, the Rams' fullback hit Onkotz and his leg snapped. He was in a cast for five months, with pins in his leg. The severely broken leg effectively ended his professional career after just nine games played. Onkotz was traded to the Pittsburgh Steelers, and after a year attempted a comeback, but did not make the team. He tried another unsuccessful comeback with the Denver Broncos.

== Personal life ==
After his short professional career, Onkotz attended graduate school at Penn State. As an undergraduate, he had gotten a degree in biophysics. Onkotz is a financial planner and affiliated with the Pennsylvania Financial Group. He married Diane Carol (Imp) Onkotz in 1968, and they reside in Boalsburg, Pennsylvania near Penn State. He has four daughters, Dana, Gretchen, Rachel, and Carly.
