= Steve Pritko =

American football player (1920–2015)

No. 11, 30, 17, 23
- Position: End

Personal information
- Born: December 21, 1920; Northampton, Pennsylvania, U.S.
- Died: June 6, 2015 (aged 94); Gardena, California, U.S.
- Listed height: 6 ft 2 in (1.88 m)
- Listed weight: 209 lb (95 kg)

Career information
- High school: Northampton; Admiral Farragut Academy (St. Petersburg, Florida)
- College: Villanova (1940-1941)
- NFL draft: 1943: 28th round, 265th overall pick

Career history

Playing
- New York Giants (1943); Cleveland/L.A. Rams (1944–1947); Boston Yanks (1948); New York Bulldogs (1949); Green Bay Packers (1949–1950)

Coaching
- Mount Carmel HS (CA) (1952–1954) Head coach; Los Angeles City (1955–1962) Head coach

Awards and highlights
- NFL champion (1945)

Career NFL statistics
- Receptions: 93
- Receiving yards: 1,114
- Receiving touchdowns: 13
- Stats at Pro Football Reference

Head coaching record
- Career: College: 36–32–2 (.529)

Stephen Pritko (December 21, 1920 – June 6, 2015) was an American professional football player and coach. He played as an end for eight seasons in the National Football League (NFL) with the New York Giants (1943), Cleveland / Los Angeles Rams (1944–1947), Boston Yanks (1948), New York Bulldogs (1949), and Green Bay Packers (1949–1950). Pritko served as the head football coach at Los Angeles City College (LACC) from 1955 to 1962.

== Early life and education ==
Pritco was born December 21, 1920, in Northampton, Pennsylvania. He attended Northampton Area High School and then Villanova University. He was of Ukrainian descent. At Villanova, where he played as a right end, he was a Ukrainian All American, an award given by the Ukrainian Life magazine.

== NFL career ==
Pritco was selected by the Cleveland Rams in the 28th round of the 1943 NFL draft. During his NFL career, he played for the New York Giants in 1943, the Cleveland and Los Angeles Rams from 1944 through 1947, the Boston Yanks in 1949, and the Green Bay Packers from 1949 until 1950.

== Coaching career ==
Pritko was hired in 1952 as the head football coach at Mount Carmel High School in Los Angeles. In 1955, he took on the same role at Los Angeles City College (LACC) and coached there through the 1962 season.

== Death ==
Pritko died June 6, 2015, in Gardena, California, at age 94.

== Head coaching record ==
=== Junior college ===
Year	Team	Overall	Conference	Standing	Bowl/playoffs
Los Angeles City Cubs (Western State Conference) (1955–1962)
1955	Los Angeles City	5–4–1	3–2	3rd	
1956	Los Angeles City	4–5	1–4	5th	
1957	Los Angeles City	7–2	4–2	3rd	
1958	Los Angeles City	4–5	2–4	T–4th	
1959	Los Angeles City	7–2	3–3	4th	
1960	Los Angeles City	2–7	2–5	T–5th	
1961	Los Angeles City	4–4–1	3–3–1	5th	
1962	Los Angeles City	3–3	3–3	T–3rd	
Los Angeles City:		36–32–2	21–26–1		
Total:		36–32–2			
