= Chapman, Pennsylvania =

Borough in Pennsylvania, United States

- Borough
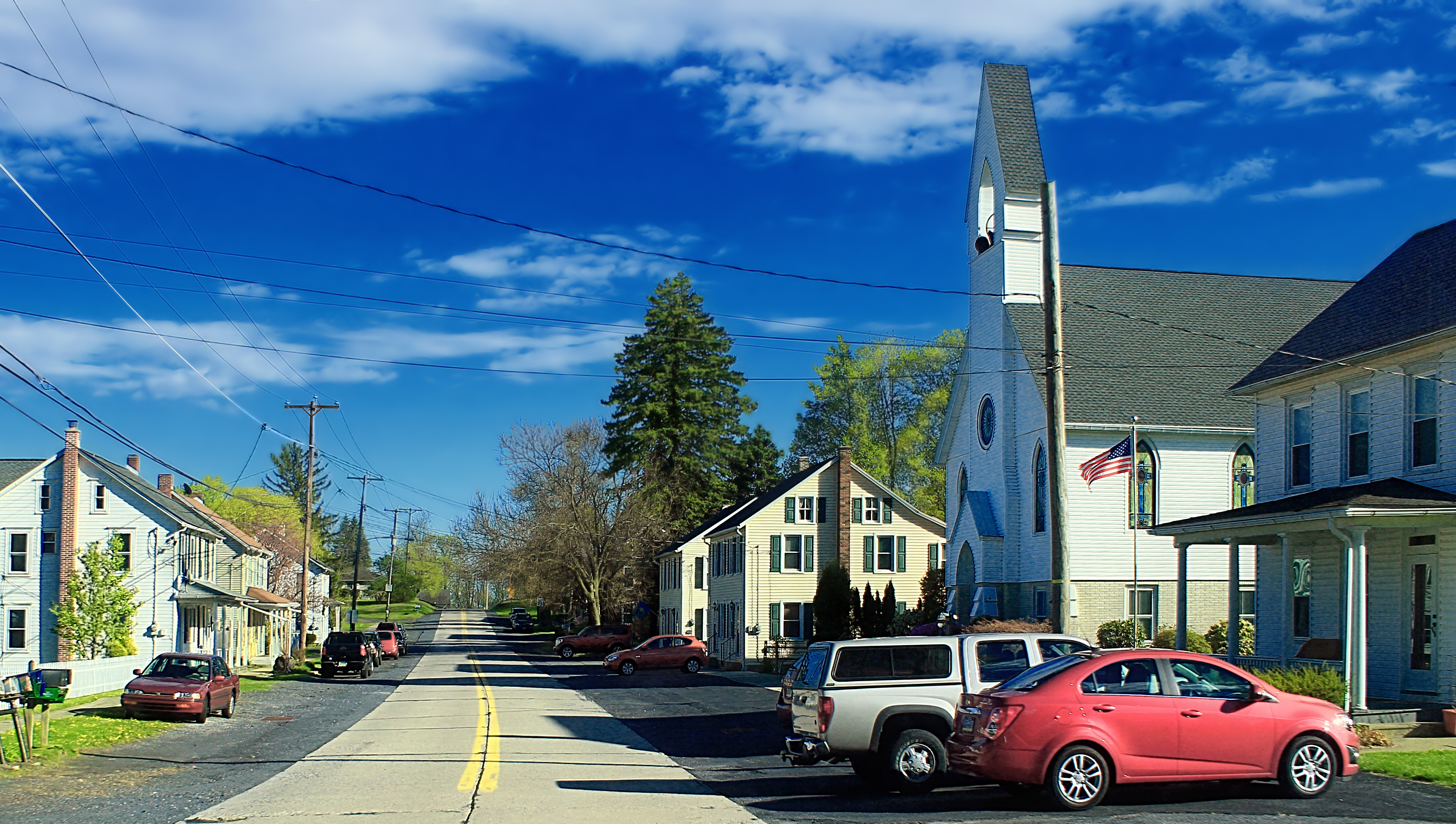
- Main Street in Chapman, May 2014

- Location of Chapman in Northampton County, Pennsylvania (left) and of Northampton County in Pennsylvania (right)

- Location of Chapman in Pennsylvania Chapman (the United States)
- Coordinates: 40°45′42″N 75°24′15″W
- Country: United States
- State: Pennsylvania
- County: Northampton

Government
  - Mayor: Dana Ackerman

Area
  - Borough: 0.36 sq mi (0.93 km^{2})
  - Land: 0.33 sq mi (0.85 km^{2})
  - Water: 0.027 sq mi (0.07 km^{2})
- Elevation: 705 ft (215 m)

Population (2020)
  - Borough: 223
  - Density: 676.7/sq mi (261.26/km^{2})
  - Metro: 865,310 (US: 68th)
- Time zone: UTC-5 (EST)
  - Summer (DST): UTC-4 (EDT)
- ZIP Code: 18014
- Area codes: 610 and 484
- FIPS code: 42-12656
- Primary airport: Lehigh Valley International Airport
- Major hospital: Lehigh Valley Hospital–Cedar Crest
- School district: Northampton Area
- Website: chapmanborough.com

Chapman is a borough in Northampton County, Pennsylvania. The population of Chapman was 223 as of the 2020 census. Chapman is part of the Lehigh Valley metropolitan area, which had a population of 861,899 and was the 68th-most populous metropolitan area in the U.S. as of the 2020 census.

== History ==
Chapman was named for William Chapman, who owned slate quarries in the borough. Chapman was from Cornwall, England. He was born in 1816 in Mt. Tonenshau in Brussels, where his mother had gone to nurse his father after being severely injured in the Battle of Waterloo. At the age of seven, Chapman began working in the Delabole slate quarries in Cornwall, where his father worked. At the age of 26, Chapman emigrated to the United States, where he leased property in Northampton County and later purchased the property and started the Chapman Slate Company.

While the slate quarries were originally opened in 1850, the company itself was officially incorporated by a special act of the Pennsylvania state legislature in 1864 with a capital stock of $300,000. The quarry grew to a considerable size measuring from 700 to 800 feet along a longitudinal joint and was about 200 feet wide and 300 feet deep. William Chapman died in Bethlehem, Pennsylvania in 1903 at the age of 86.

== Geography ==
Chapman is located at 40°45′42″N 75°24′15″W (40.761567, -75.404270). According to the U.S. Census Bureau, the borough has a total area of 0.4 square miles (1.0 km^{2}), of which 0.4 square miles (1.0 km^{2}) is land and 0.0% is water. It is drained by the Monocacy Creek into the Lehigh River. The township is surrounded by Moore Township.

== Transportation ==
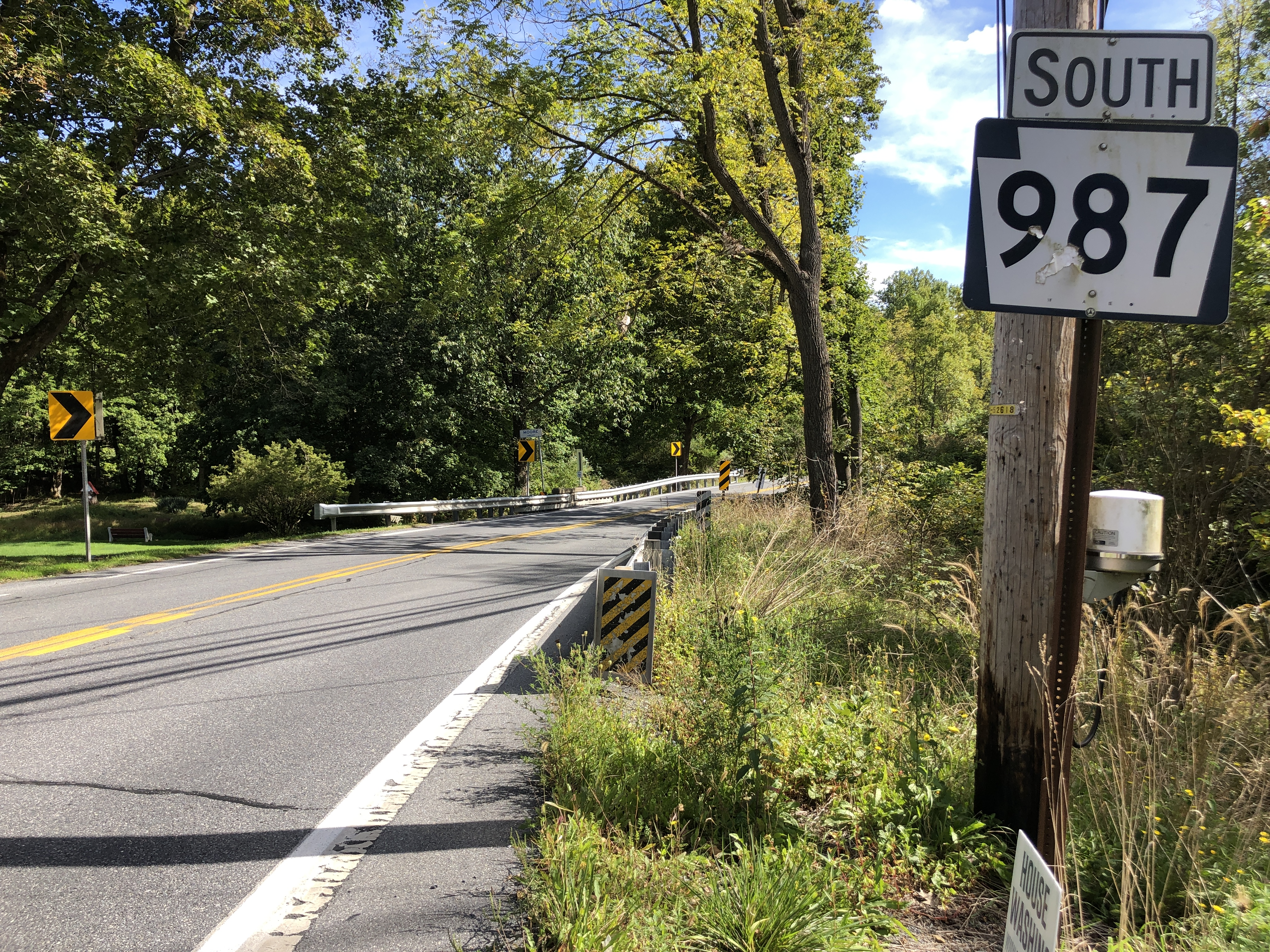
PA Route 987 South in Chapman

As of 2007, there were 2.53 miles (4.07 km) of public roads in Bath, of which 1.66 miles (2.67 km) were maintained by the Pennsylvania Department of Transportation (PennDOT) and 0.87 miles (1.40 km) were maintained by the borough.

Route 987 follows Chapman's southwestern boundary on its way between Klecknersville and Bath as Monocacy Drive. Its other primary two streets are east-to-west Fifth Street and north-to-south Main Street.

== Demographics ==
Historical population
Census	Pop.	Note	%±
1870	388		—
1880	382		−1.5%
1890	392		2.6%
1900	319		−18.6%
1910	253		−20.7%
1920	228		−9.9%
1930	232		1.8%
1940	248		6.9%
1950	285		14.9%
1960	237		−16.8%
1970	191		−19.4%
1980	255		33.5%
1990	254		−0.4%
2000	234		−7.9%
2010	199		−15.0%
2020	223		12.1%

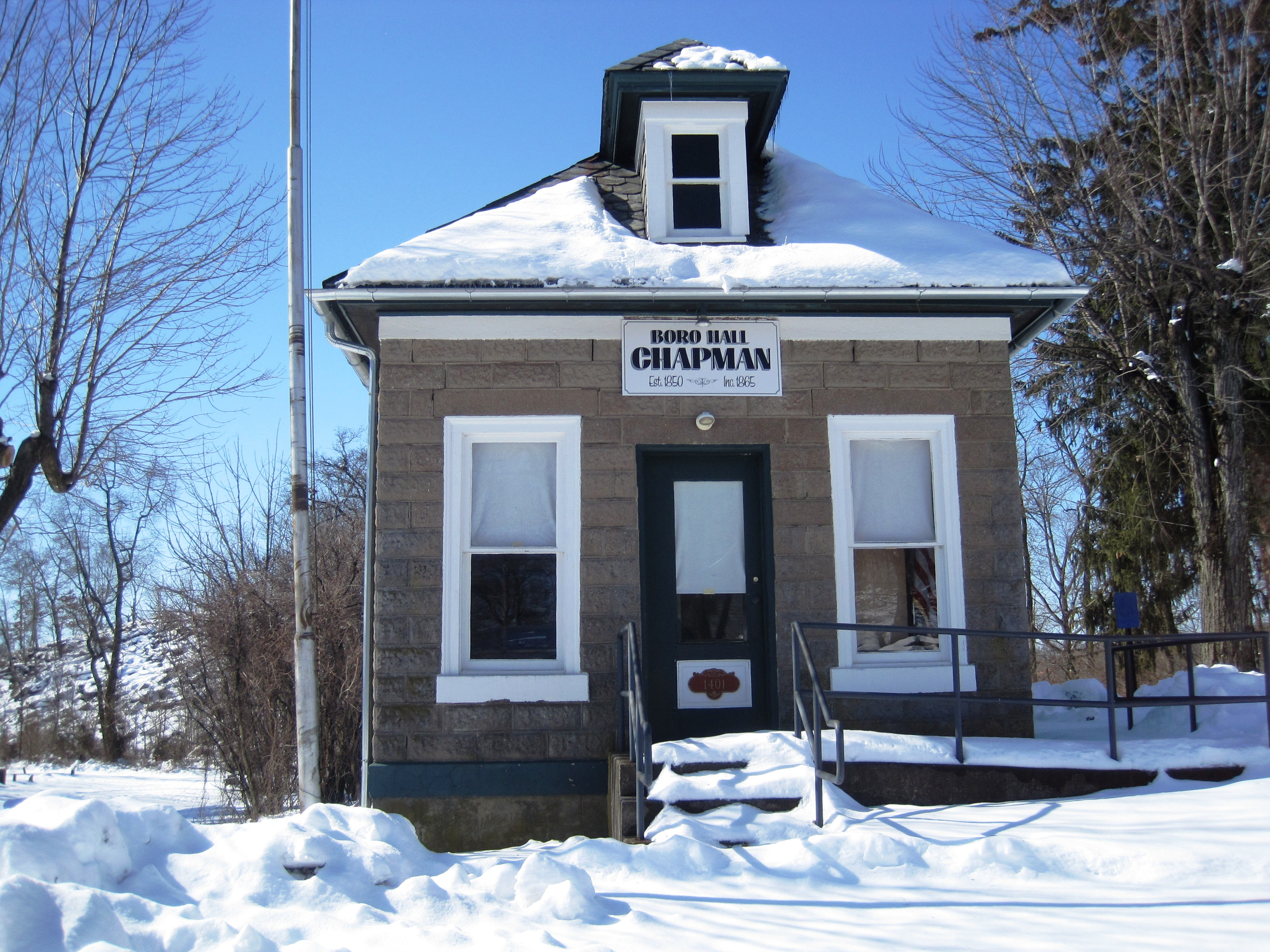
Chapman Borough Hall

As of the census of 2000, there were 234 people, 89 households, and 68 families residing in the borough. The population density was 620.1 inhabitants per square mile (239.4/km^{2}). There were 91 housing units at an average density of 241.1 per square mile (93.1/km^{2}). The racial makeup of the borough was 99.15% White, 0.43% African American and 0.43% Pacific Islander. Hispanic or Latino of any race were 0.43% of the population.

There were 89 households, out of which 31.5% had children under the age of 18 living with them, 59.6% were married couples living together, 6.7% had a female householder with no husband present, and 22.5% were non-families. 21.3% of all households were made up of individuals, and 6.7% had someone living alone who was 65 years of age or older. The average household size was 2.63 and the average family size was 2.91.

In the borough, the population was spread out, with 25.6% under the age of 18, 7.7% from 18 to 24, 26.9% from 25 to 44, 29.1% from 45 to 64, and 10.7% who were 65 years of age or older. The median age was 38 years. For every 100 females there were 112.7 males. For every 100 females age 18 and over, there were 114.8 males.

The median income for a household in the borough was $38,750, and the median income for a family was $42,917. Males had a median income of $36,000 versus $21,563 for females. The per capita income for the borough was $15,571. About 3.1% of families and 5.3% of the population were below the poverty line, including none of those under the age of 18 and 20.8% of those 65 or over.

== Public education ==
The borough is served by the Northampton Area School District. Students in grades nine through 12 attend Northampton Area High School in Northampton.
