= University Club of Bethlehem =

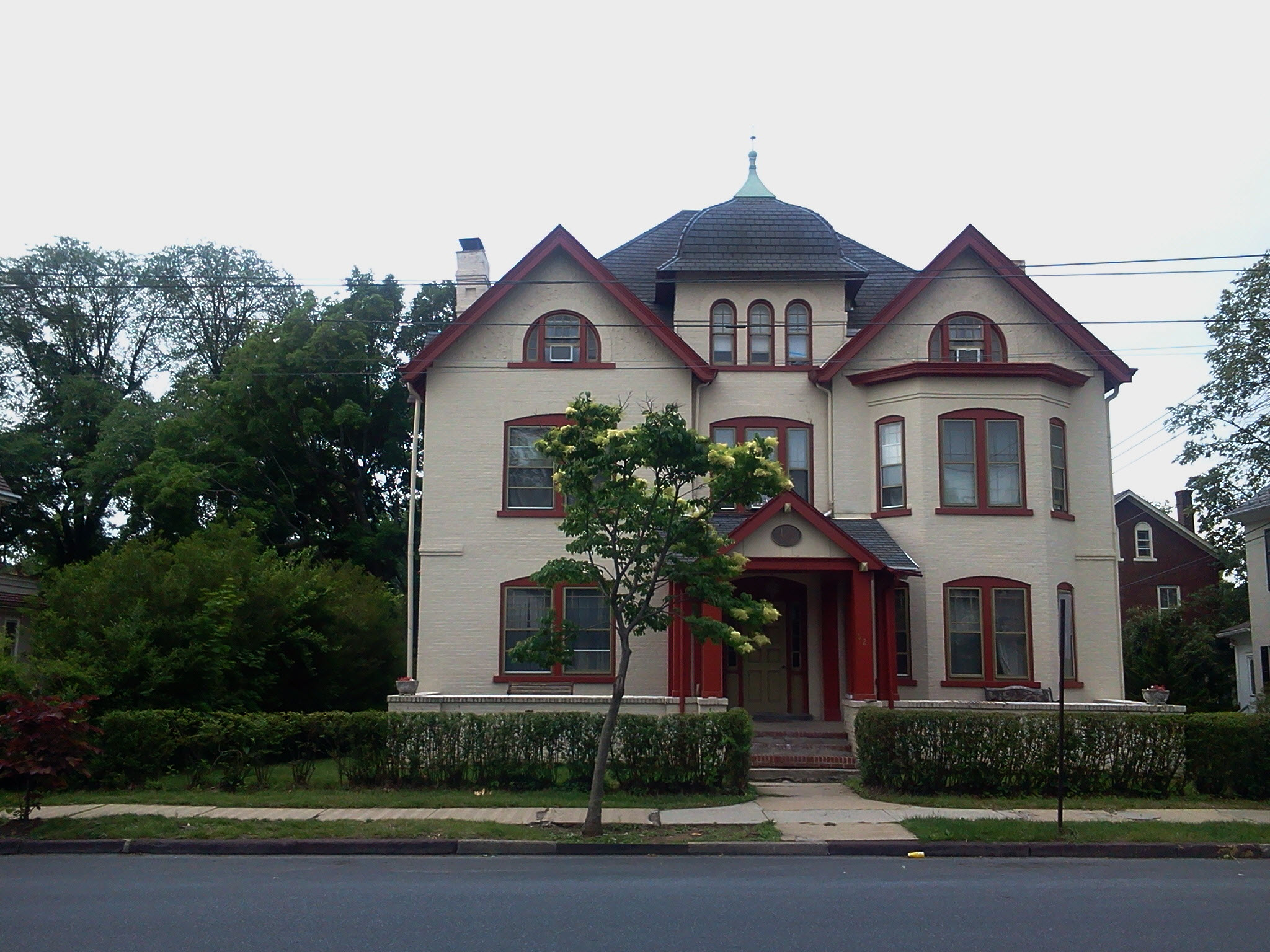
The University Club of Bethlehem, located at 62 East Market Street, Bethlehem, Pennsylvania, June 2015

The University Club of Bethlehem (UCB) was organized in 1911 by five graduate students to provide living and dining facilities and to serve as a center of social activity for qualified persons attending institutions of higher education in the Lehigh Valley area.

In May, 1916, the current residence valued at approximately $750,000, and located at 62 East Market Street in the heart of Bethlehem's Historic & Preservation District, was purchased with funds provided by some of the early members from the estate of Herman O. Burkhardt, who originally built the mansion in 1890.

The corporate charter of the University Club of Bethlehem was registered with the County of Northampton on July 7, 1916. In 1934, the University Club of Bethlehem became a registered non-profit corporation in the Commonwealth of Pennsylvania.
