= Kreidersville Covered Bridge =

- U.S. National Register of Historic Places
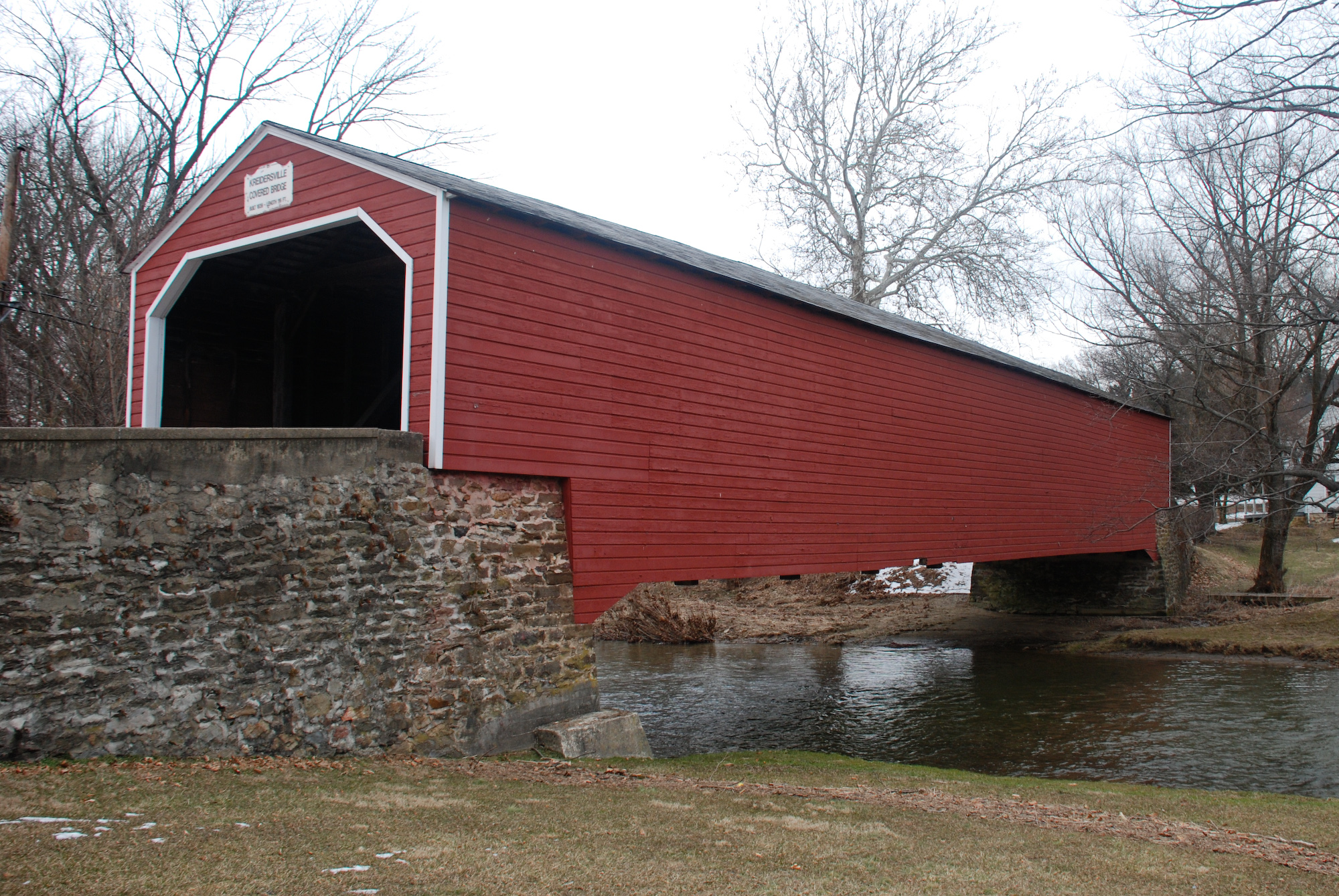
- Kreidersville Covered Bridge

- Location within Pennsylvania Location within the United States
- Location: N of Northampton on LR 48061, near Kreidersville, Allen Township, Pennsylvania
- Coordinates: 40°43′25″N 75°29′35″W
- Area: 0.1 acres (0.040 ha)
- Built: 1840
- Architectural style: Burr Truss covered bridge
- MPS: Covered Bridges of the Delaware River Watershed TR
- NRHP reference No.: 80003587
- Added to NRHP: December 1, 1980

The Kreidersville Covered Bridge, which was built in 1839, is the last remaining covered bridge in Northampton County, Pennsylvania.

It was added to the National Register of Historic Places in 1980.

== History ==
In 1959, inspired citizens of Northampton County rallied for the preservation of this historic structure after it became known that the State Highway Department had developed plans to replace it with a new concrete bridge. This structure then became one of the first covered bridges to be recognized for preservation by a committee of enthusiasts when those residents formed The Theodore Burr Covered Bridge Society of Pennsylvania, which they named after the arched truss that was patented by Theodore Burr and used in this bridge's construction.

In 1960, The Burr Covered Bridge Society, together with The Harmony Grange and local citizens, influenced Northampton County Commissioners to accept ownership after the Pennsylvania State Highway Department restored the bridge.

On September 30, 1961, state, county, and local representatives took part in rededicating the bridge, then known as Solt's Bridge. Kreidersville Covered Bridge was once known in the community as "Hummel's - Koch's - Solt's Bridge." They were names of families who lived near the bridge at the time.

== Architectural features ==
The Kreidersville Covered Bridge crosses the Hokendauqua Creek. A Burr truss, wooden, covered bridge, it is 116 feet long, and is the last stop on the Lehigh Valley Covered Bridge tour through Northampton and Lehigh counties.

The bridge was added to the National Register of Historic Places in 1980.
