= John Rosbrugh =

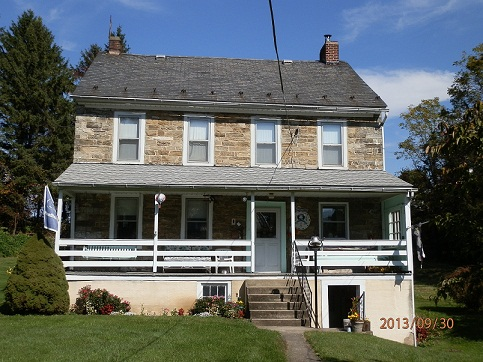
Rosbrugh's house, built in approximately 1766

The Rev. John Rosbrugh (c. 1714 – 1777), was an ordained a Presbyterian minister. In 1776, at the beginning of the American Revolutionary War, he organized and became commander of the 3rd Northampton County, Pennsylvania militia, and then accepted a commission as company chaplain. Rosbrugh was killed at the Battle of the Assunpink Creek, also known as the Second Battle of Trenton, the first U.S. chaplain killed in battle.

== Early life and education ==
Rosbrugh (Variant spellings include Roxborough, Roxburgh, Rosborough) was born about 1714 in Enniskillen, County Fermanagh, Northern Ireland, and came to the American colonies with his older brother, William. The family was originally from Ayrshire, Scotland and had come from that country during the settling of the Ulster Plantation.

In 1733, at age 19, Rosbrugh was living in New Jersey and married his wife Sarah, who died in childbirth along with their only child. William B. Sprague wrote in his Annals of the American Pulpit that Rosbrugh "had already learned a trade, but had been so well educated in all the elementary branches that he was capable of teaching a school and it was by this means chiefly that he was able to prepare himself for college."

Rosbrugh attended the College of New Jersey, later renamed Princeton University, where he graduated in 1761. He was taken on trials by the New Brunswick Presbytery in 1762, and licensed to preach in August 1763.

== Career ==
=== Ministry ===
In October 1764, he was called to the congregations of Greenwich, Oxford, and Mansfield Woodhouse, all in western New Jersey. In December 1764, he was ordained a Presbyterian minister. In 1765, he was assigned additional duties in neighboring congregations in Upper and Lower Hardwick in the Presbytery of Newton, New Jersey.

In 1766, Rosbrugh married Jane Ralston, daughter of James Ralston of the Irish Settlement known as Allen Township, Pennsylvania in present-day East Allen Township, Pennsylvania, 20 miles west of where Rosbrugh was currently serving as pastor.

In 1769, Rosbrugh was called to serve at that same congregation in Allen Township where his wife was from and they moved to the "Irish Settlement", named for its Scots-Irish settlers, where he became their permanent minister. For seven years, he ministered to his congregation in Allen Township, raising his young family and at times serving to the needs of nearby congregations.

=== Revolutionary War ===
In 1776, with the outbreak of the American Revolutionary War against the British, the pulpit was one of the main forms of communications of the day, Rosbrugh stirred his congregation to action against the British and the men of the congregation formed a company of militia and agreed to go to war provided Rosbrugh would lead them. He had expected to accompany them as their chaplain but reluctantly agreed to lead them. John Rosbrugh took his place at the head of the company and slinging his musket over his shoulder led the company to join General Washington and the Continental Army in Philadelphia.

While in Philadelphia, it was determined that Rosbrugh would be better suited to take the position of company chaplain, which he readily accepted. Captain John Hays took his place as company commander. At that time a chaplain, although not provided a uniform held the rank of major and pay of thirty-three and a half dollars per month. Presbyterian ministers, however, were particularly hated by the British and if captured suffered the cruelest treatments.

On arriving in Philadelphia, Rosbrugh's company joined the rest of the Northampton County militia in camp. John Rosbrugh was able to dine with his brother-in-law, John Ralston, a member of the Second Continental Congress. The 3rd Battalion was under the command of General Israel Putnam who had orders to cross the Delaware on 25 December in support of Washington's surprise attack on Battle of Trenton, but Putnam decided not to cross due to weather conditions so Rosbrugh's battalion remained in Philadelphia. After General Washington crossed back to Pennsylvania with his Hessian prisoners and captured goods, he decided to take Trenton a second time. This time, the 3rd Northampton militia was included and arrived in time for the second battle of Trenton, also known as the battle of Assinpink creek.

== Death and burial ==
The afternoon of January 2 found the American lines, on the southside of Assunpink Creek, preparing their positions for the upcoming battle. Rosbrugh was dining at a public house when the warning was given that Hessians were coming. Going outside he found his horse had been taken and he was suddenly confronted by a company of Hessians under the command of a British officer. He surrendered but they recognized him as a Presbyterian minister and bayoneted him to death on the spot. (Note: There is reason to believe that the reason Hessian soldiers so brutally executed Rosbrugh is that they mistook him for the hated John Witherspoon, who British troops had recently burned in effigy. See: William M. Dwyer, The Day is Ours! An Inside View of the Battles of Trenton and Princeton, November 1776-January 1777 (Rutgers University Press, New Brunswick, NJ, 1998) p. 323.) His executioners took his watch, money, and left his body naked in the snow. Captain Hays, on hearing of the death of his pastor wrapped the body and quickly buried him where he fell.

The next morning, George Duffield, a Presbyterian chaplain took the body of his friend and reburied him in the graveyard of the First Presbyterian Church in Trenton, New Jersey. It is believed he still rests there today with his grave marked by a stone shaped as a clock.

Rosbrugh's widow, Jane (née Ralston) survived him by 32 years, dying on March 27, 1809, and was interred at the cemetery in East Allen Township in Northampton County, Pennsylvania, with the inscription on her tombstone indicating her husband John is buried beside her, raising questions about the precise location of Rosbrugh's final resting place.

== Family ==
Around 1766, Rosbrugh married Jane Ralston (1739–1809), his second wife, who was the daughter of James Ralston from Allen Township, Pennsylvania in what is present-day East Allen Township, Pennsylvania John and Jane had five children:

- James Rosbrugh - (b. Apr. 24, 1767) – County Judge, New York state legislator, Captain of militia in the War of 1812, who resided at Groveland, New York, where he died November 18, 1850
- Letitia Rosbrugh - (b. Apr 12, 1769) – Married Samuel Ralston, they remained in Allen Township, Pennsylvania
- Mary Rosbrugh – Married Robert Ralston, her cousin, a member of the Continental Congress; they had a daughter, Christina.
- Sarah Rosbrugh – Never married, moved to Western New York, and died at age 27
- John Rosbrugh – (b. prob. 1776), he never married and remained a resident of Allen Township, up to about 1880; nothing further is known of him.
