= East Allen Township, Pennsylvania =

Township in Pennsylvania, US

East Allen Township
- Township
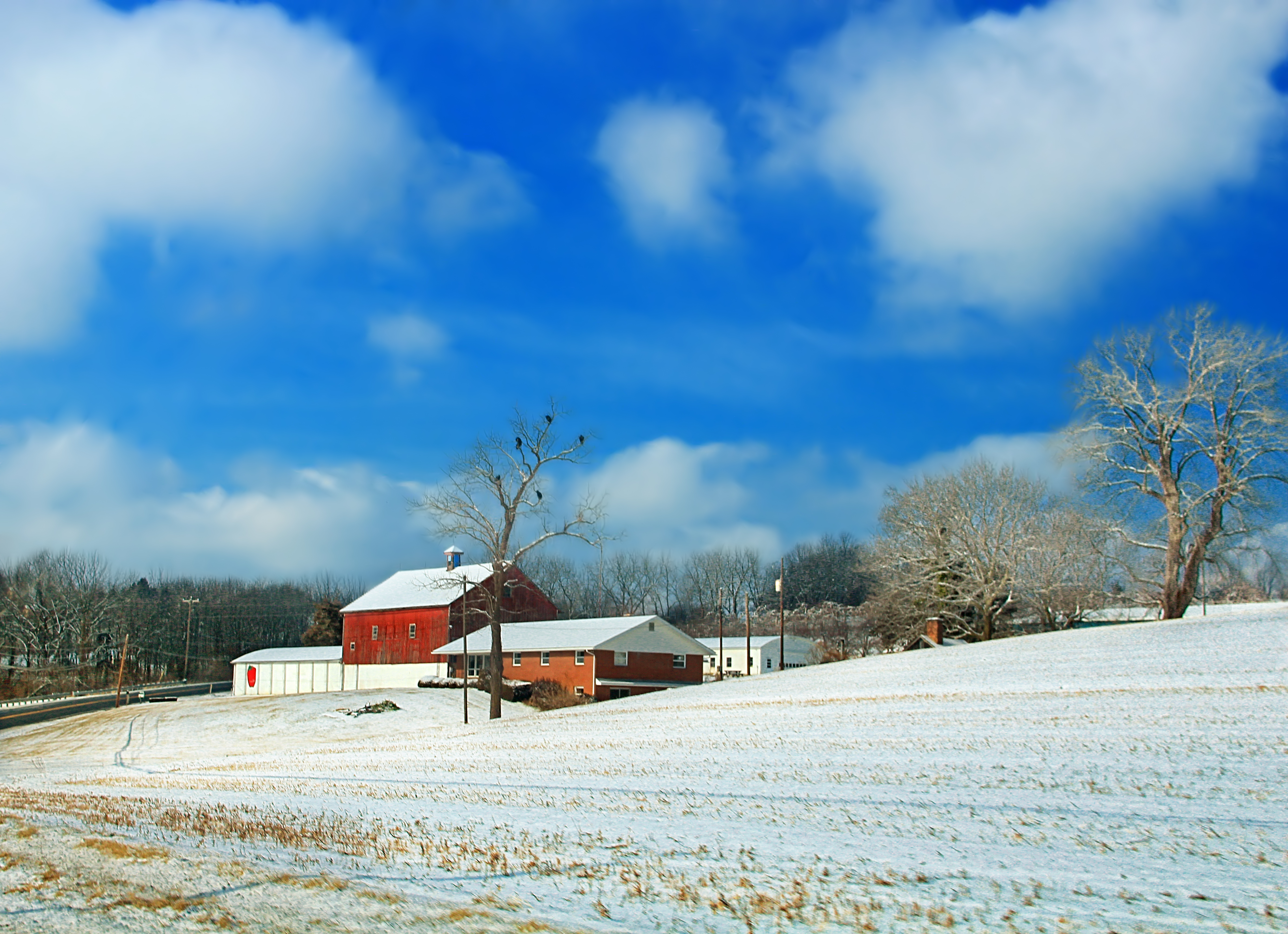
- A farm in the township in February 2013

- Flag Seal Logo

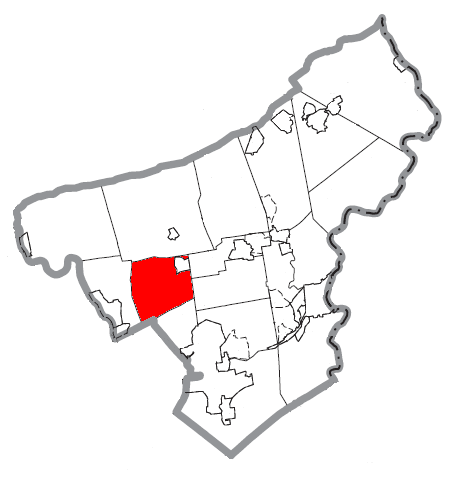
- Location of East Allen Township in Northampton County, Pennsylvania

- Location of Pennsylvania in the United States
- Coordinates: 40°42′30″N 75°24′59″W
- Country: United States
- State: Pennsylvania
- County: Northampton

Area
  - Township: 14.67 sq mi (38.00 km^{2})
  - Land: 14.55 sq mi (37.69 km^{2})
  - Water: 0.12 sq mi (0.32 km^{2})
- Elevation: 571 ft (174 m)

Population (2020)
  - Township: 5,010
  - Estimate (2023): 5,309
  - Density: 334.5/sq mi (129.17/km^{2})
  - Metro: 865,310 (US: 68th)
- Time zone: UTC-5 (EST)
  - Summer (DST): UTC-4 (EDT)
- Area code: 610
- FIPS code: 42-095-20736
- Primary airport: Lehigh Valley International Airport
- Major hospital: Lehigh Valley Hospital–Cedar Crest
- School district: Northampton Area
- Website: www.eatwp.org

East Allen Township is a township in Northampton County, Pennsylvania, United States. The population of East Allen Township was 5,010 at the 2020 census. East Allen is part of the Lehigh Valley metropolitan area, which had a population of 861,899 and was the 68th-most populous metropolitan area in the U.S. as of the 2020 census.

== Geography ==
According to the U.S. Census Bureau, the township has a total area of 14.4 square miles (37 km^{2}), all land. It is drained by the Lehigh River via the Catasauqua Creek and Monocacy Creek. Its villages include Franks Corner, Jacksonville, Jamesville (also in Moore Township), Seemsville (also in Allen Township), and Weaversville (also in Allen Township).

== History ==
Craig's Scotch-Irish Settlement was established in 1728, and is the oldest permanent settlement in Northampton County along the Catasauqua Creek. In 1730 they started meeting as a congregation in homes. The Scotch-Irish Presbyterians of Allen Township established a church, in 1731, made of logs. The present church (now God's Missionary Church) was built in 1813. It is the 3rd church that was built by the Presbyterians. East Allen Township was established in 1842 from what was Allen Twp. With the new township boundaries, the settlement is now located in East Allen Township at 4965 Nor-Bath Blvd. in Northampton, PA 18067 (between Bath and Northampton).

At the start of the Revolutionary War, John Ralston was the auditor of depreciations, George Palmer was coroner, William McNair and Jacob Horner were justices of the peace. Neigal Gray and John Ralston attended the provincial conference held in Carpenter's Hall. Ralston and Robert Lattimore were members of the Pennsylvania General Assembly. Arthur Lattimore, Neigal Gray, and John Hays, Jr. were on the Standing Committee of Correspondence.

Thomas Craig and John Craig served as the area's Lieutenants. Sub Lt.s were Arthur Lattimore and John Hays. John Ralston served as paymaster. William McNair was an agent for Forfeited Properties. Robert Lattimore was a Commissioner to collect clothing. Arthur Lattimore was a Justice of the Courts of General Quarter Sessions and of Common Pleas. John Hays, Jr. was a member of the Commission of Observation.

Northampton County was formed in 1752, which included the settlement that was already 24 years old. Many of them held the first county offices in Easton. William Craig and J. Lattimore were Prothonotary and Clerks of Quarter Sessions. Built in 1757, Fort Ralston is located near Bath and was built to protect settlers from Indian attacks during the French and Indian War. The fort is near the present intersection of Route 329 and Airport Road in a farmer's field. It is still standing, however quite damaged.

The first official burial in Horner's Cemetery was in 1745, but a baby in the old section makes it the oldest cemetery in Northampton County. Horner's Cemetery contains the graves of many of the region's earliest inhabitants, including 21 veterans from four U.S. wars. There is a stone for Robert Brown, a lieutenant colonel in George Washington's Flying Camp, who served in Pennsylvania's State Assembly and then the U.S. Congress after his service in the American Revolutionary War. Brown also owned the Friendship Tree. George Palmer, Deputy Surveyor-General of Pennsylvania, and Surgeon-General Dr. Matthew McHenry are both buried there. James Ralston also laid out the town of Bath and Gen. William Lattimore owned the first house there. Hugh Wilson was the founder of Northampton. All four are buried at Horner's Cemetery. The cemetery has been restored by local members of the community, starting in 2008. The Horner Cemetery Historical Society was formed in 2011.

=== Neighboring municipalities ===
- Bath (northeast)
- Upper Nazareth Township (northeast)
- Lower Nazareth Township (east)
- Hanover Township (south)
- Hanover Township (southwest)
- Allen Township (west)
- Moore Township (north)

== Demographics ==
Historical population
| Census | Pop. | Note | %± |
|---|---|---|---|
| 2000 | 4,903 | | — |
| 2010 | 4,903 | | 0.0% |
| 2020 | 5,010 | | 2.2% |
| 2023 (est.) | 5,309 | | 6.0% |
U.S. Decennial Census

As of the 2000 census, there were 4,903 people, 1,864 households, and 1,461 families residing in the township. The population density was 339.9 inhabitants per square mile (131.2/km^{2}). There were 1,907 housing units at an average density of 132.2 per square mile (51.0/km^{2}). The racial makeup of the township was 97.65% White, 0.49% African American, 0.08% Native American, 0.55% Asian, 0.10% Pacific Islander, 0.51% from other races, and 0.61% from two or more races. Hispanic or Latino of any race were 1.71% of the population.

There were 1,864 households, out of which 29.5% had children under the age of 18 living with them, 69.6% were married couples living together, 6.1% had a female householder with no husband present, and 21.6% were non-families. 16.5% of all households were made up of individuals, and 6.9% had someone living alone who was 65 years of age or older. The average household size was 2.61 and the average family size was 2.95.

In the township, the population was spread out, with 22.3% under the age of 18, 6.0% from 18 to 24, 26.2% from 25 to 44, 32.4% from 45 to 64, and 13.0% who were 65 years of age or older. The median age was 42 years. For every 100 females, there were 97.1 males. For every 100 females age 18 and over, there were 96.0 males.

The median income for a household in the township was $55,694, and the median income for a family was $59,007. Males had a median income of $40,194 versus $28,387 for females. The per capita income for the township was $23,684. About 2.5% of families and 2.7% of the population were below the poverty line, including 4.0% of those under age 18 and 1.6% of those age 65 or over.

== Transportation ==
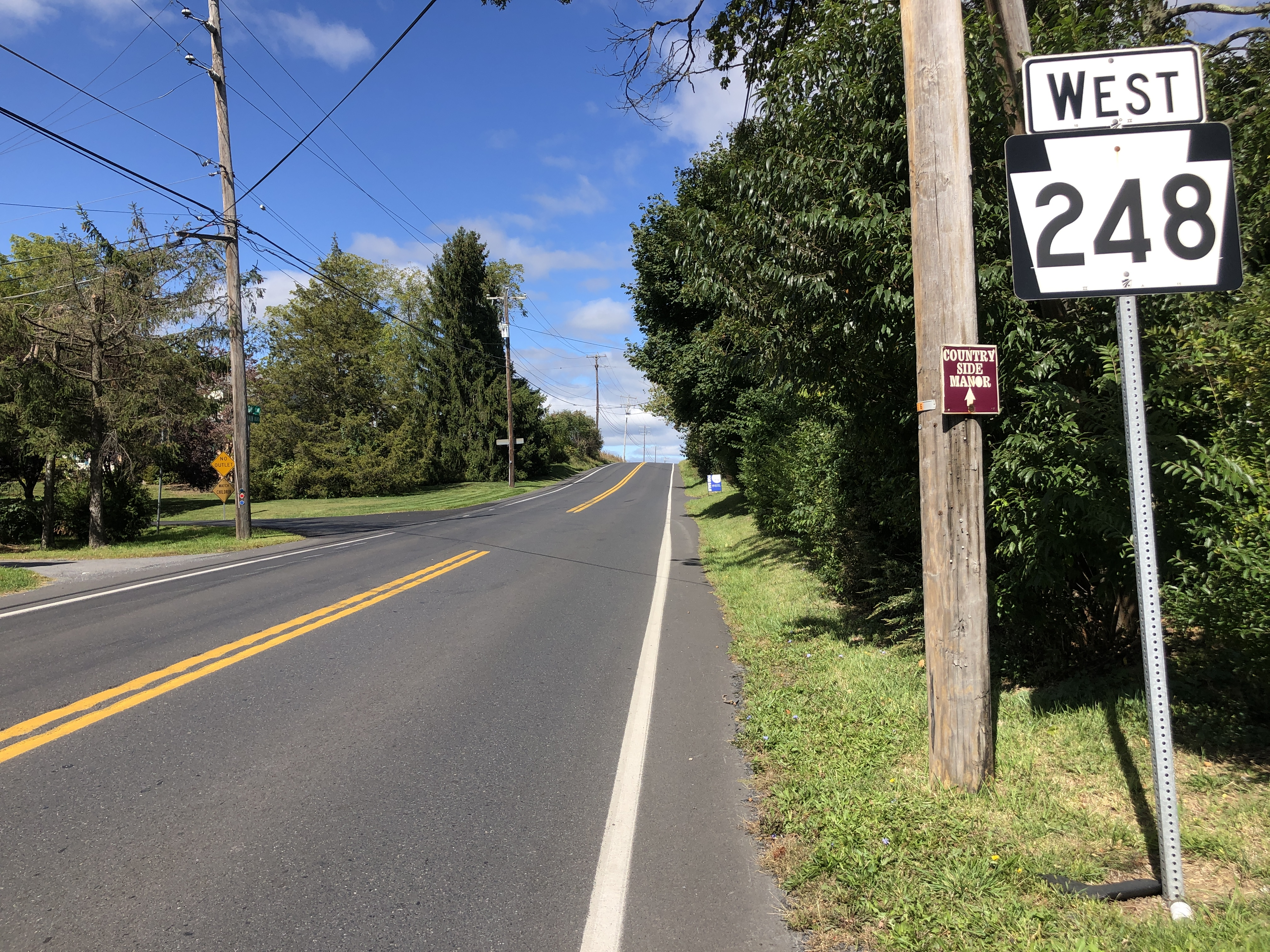
PA Route 248 West in East Allen Township

As of 2016, there were 54.24 miles (87.29 km) of public roads in East Allen Township, of which 16.42 miles (26.43 km) were maintained by the Pennsylvania Department of Transportation (PennDOT) and 37.82 miles (60.87 km) were maintained by the township.

Numbered highways traversing East Allen Township include Pennsylvania Route 248, Pennsylvania Route 329, Pennsylvania Route 512 and Pennsylvania Route 987. PA 248 follows the Bath Pike along a northwest-southeast alignment across the northeastern portion of the township. PA 329 follows Northampton-Bath Boulevard along a southwest-northeast alignment through the center of the township. PA 512 follows Bath Pike along a north-south alignment across the eastern portion of the township. PA 987 follows Airport Road along a north-south alignment through the south-central portion of the township, becoming concurrent with PA 329 from there. Other local roads of note are Hanoverville Road, Jacksonville Road, Old Carriage Road, Seemsville Road, and Weaversville Road.

== Public education ==
The Township is served by the Northampton Area School District. Students in grades nine through 12 attend Northampton Area High School.
