= Nor-Bath Trail =

Rail trail in Pennsylvania, United States

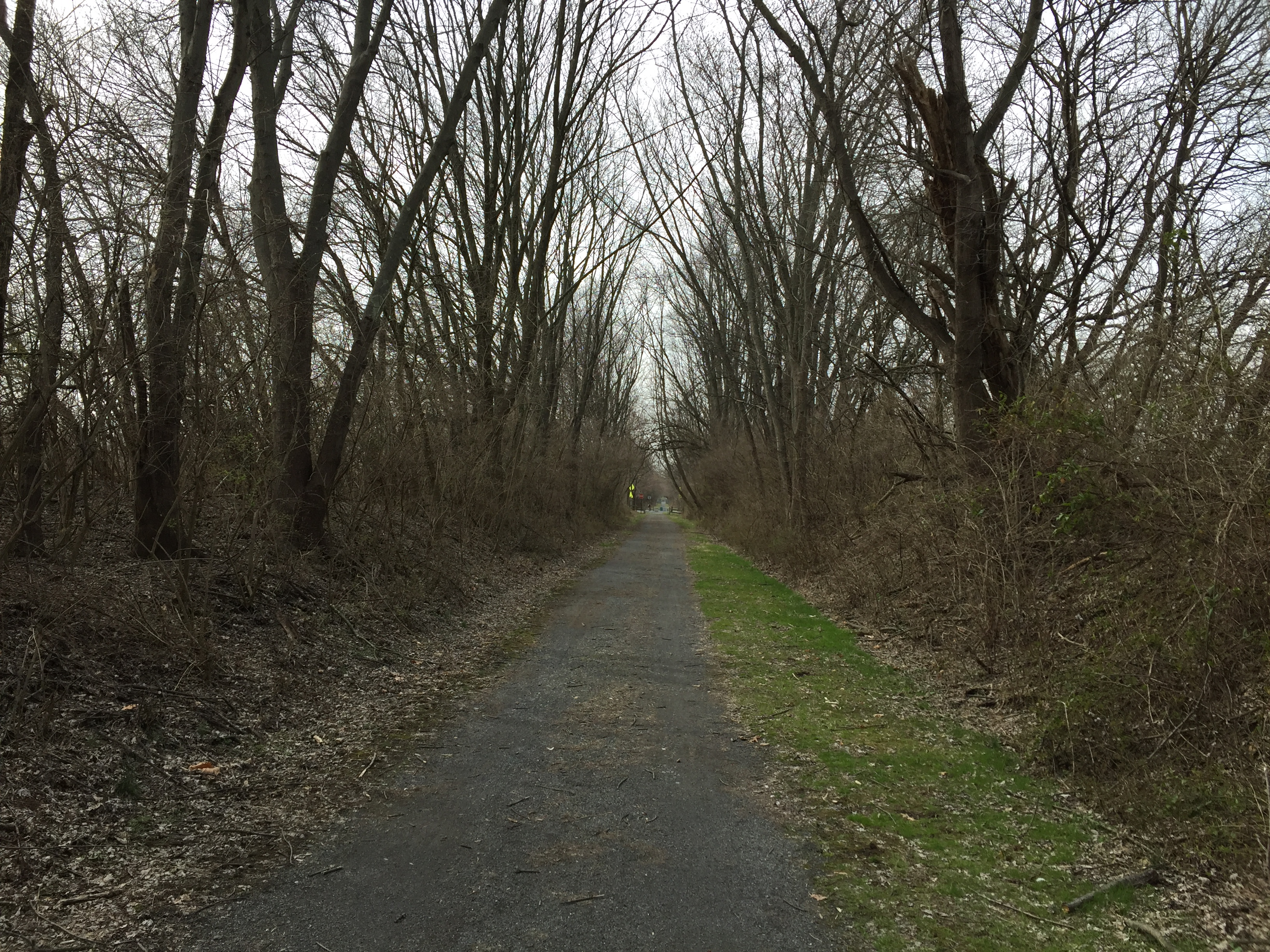
- The Nor-Bath Trail, facing Northampton
- Length: 5.9 miles (9.5 km)
- Location: Northampton County, Pennsylvania
- Trailheads: Northampton, Pennsylvania; Bath, Pennsylvania
- Use: Hiking, Cycling
- Surface: Asphalt, crushed stone

The Nor-Bath Trail is a 5.9-mile (9.5 km) multi-use rail-trail that runs between the boroughs of Northampton and Bath in Northampton County, Pennsylvania.

The trail follows the route of the former Northampton and Bath Railroad, a shortline railroad connecting the Atlas Portland Cement Company to other railroads. The rail fell into disuse in 1979 as the local cement industry began to decline. In 2017, a 1-mile (1.6 km) asphalt extension was added to the trail in order to link it to the D&L Trail.

The trail begins in Northampton, sharing the same trailhead as the D&L Trail, and continues past the Atlas Cement Company Memorial Museum, the Northampton Recreation Center, and Atlas Sports Complex. The trail then enters a wooded portion before running through a residential area. East Allen Township's Bicentennial Park is then located about 3.3 miles (5.3 km) from the trailhead. The trail continues and crosses Airport Road (Pennsylvania Route 987), and ends near Jacksonville Park in Bath.
