= Catasauqua Creek =

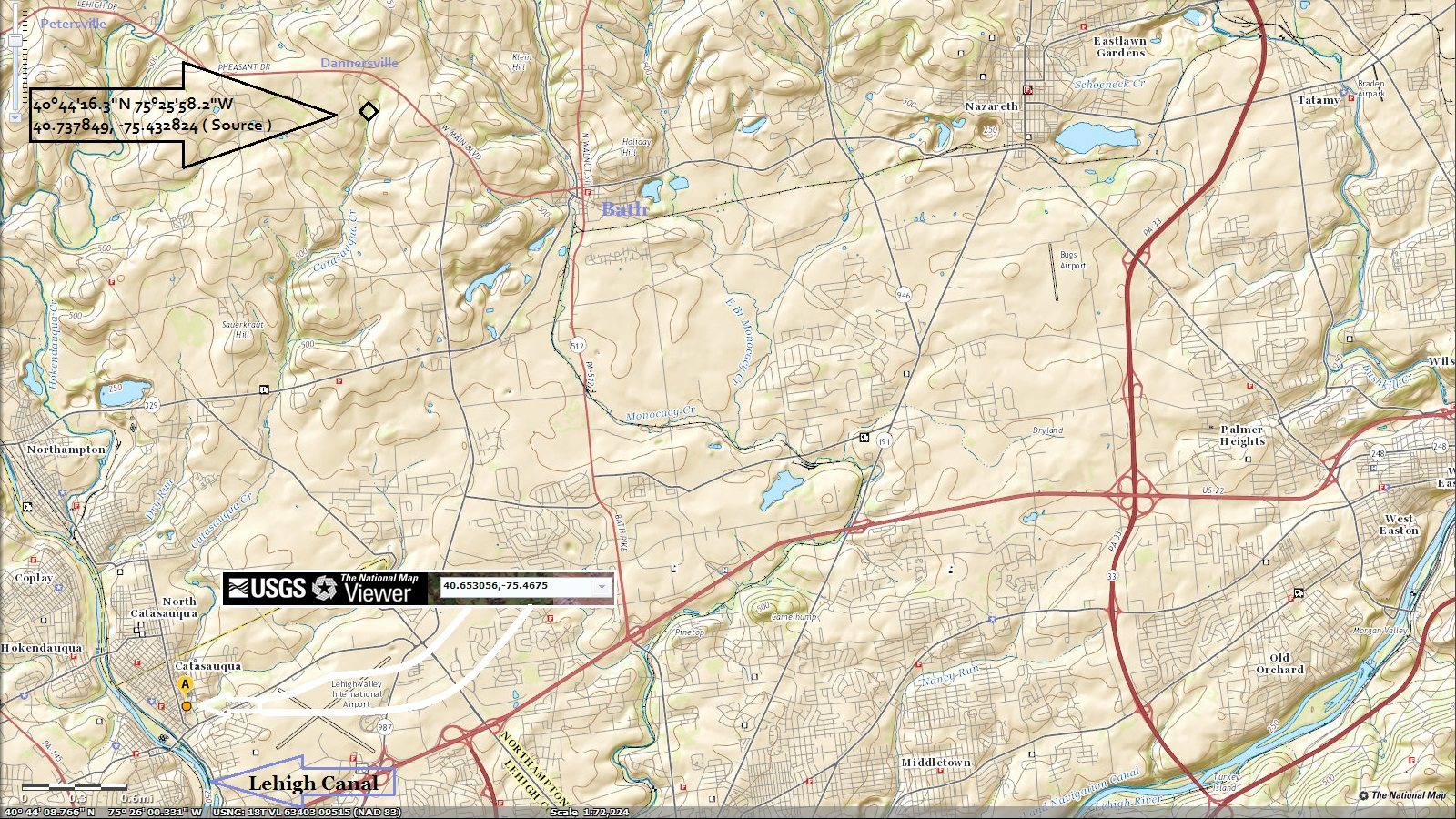
- Catasauqua Creek watercourse in Catasauqua, Pennsylvania

Physical characteristics
- Source
  - location: Northampton, Pennsylvania ~2,052 feet (625 m) south of Pheasant Drive, county road 248, (in the dell between Hilltop Rd and Sickle Rd., ~3,530 feet (1,080 m) north of their junction.
  - coordinates: 40°44′16″N 75°26′01″W
  - elevation: 610 feet (186 m)
- Mouth
  - location: In Catasauqua opposite West Catasauqua and Allentown just south of the Race/W.Race Street Bridge on the Lehigh River below the Lehigh Gap and north of Bethlehem, PA.
  - coordinates: 40°38′49″N 75°28′08″W
  - elevation: 272 ft (83 m)
- Length: 14.9 mi (24.0 km)

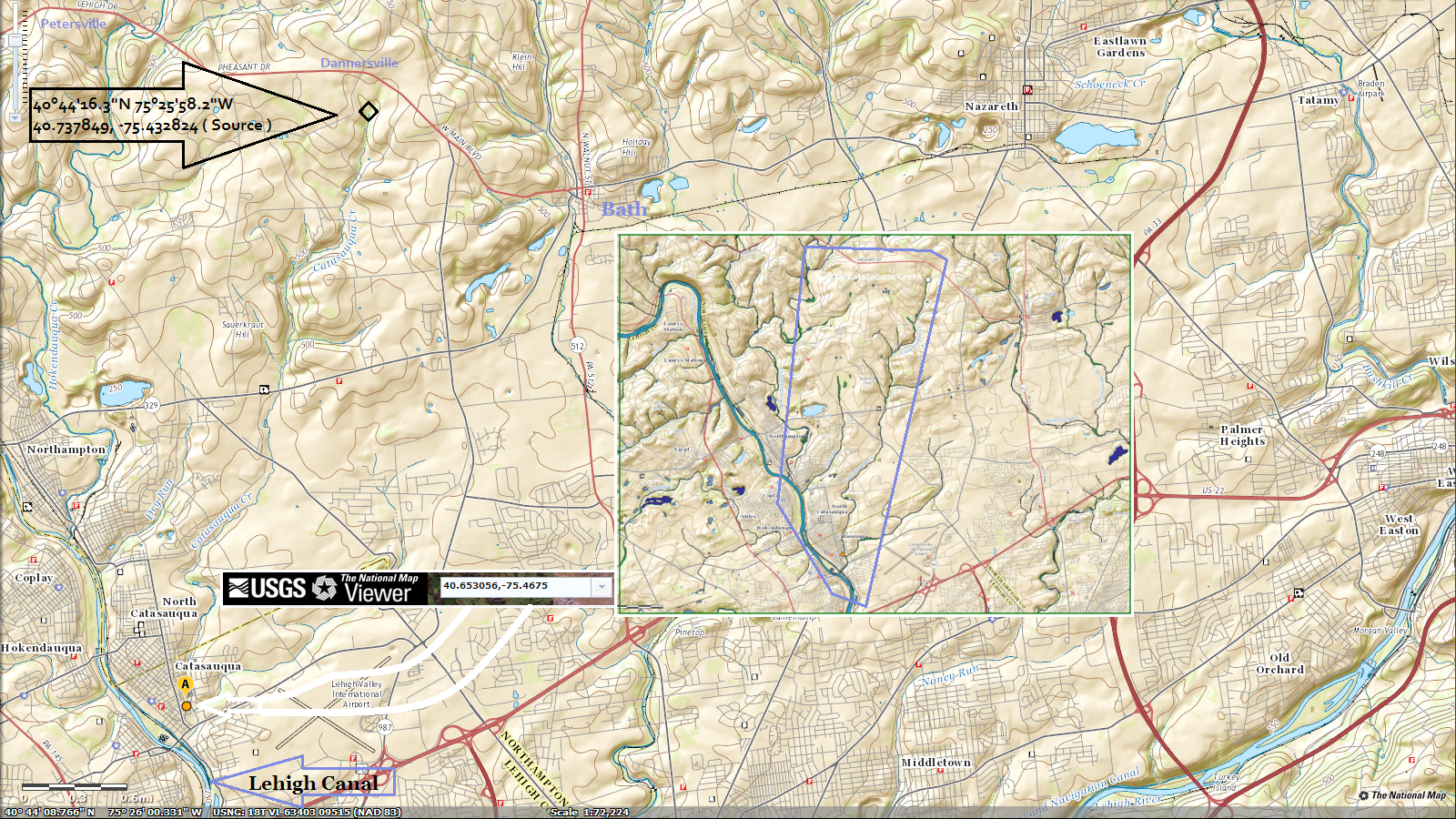
Map of Lehigh Canal and Lehigh River

Catasauqua Creek is an ENE–SSW oriented creek draining 6.6 miles (10.6 km) (straight line distance) from springs of the Blue Mountain barrier ridge several miles below the Lehigh Gap in the Ridge-and-Valley Appalachians located upriver and opposite from Allentown in Lehigh and Northampton counties in the Lehigh Valley region of eastern Pennsylvania.

The mouth of the creek outlets directly opposite West Catasauqua just below Race Street bridge across the Lehigh River, the latest of the several successor structures built to replace the original wooden bridge built in 1839-1840 to carry heavy wagons of iron ore to the new furnaces being built within the new village aborning as the Lehigh Crane Iron Company created the infrastructure to father the iron and steel industry of the Lehigh Valley.

The head of the Creek begins in the Dannersville neighborhood of Bath at 40°44′16″N latitude 75°25′58″W longitude (or 40.737849,-75.432824), forming a steep sided ravine almost immediately as it gathers waters over its first mile. As it passes Sauerkraut Hill, it gathers two major tributary creeks and leaves a steeper terrain for a gentler run over the last four miles.

== History ==
Catasauqua Creek was the water course along which six of the first eight successful anthracite-fueled iron smelting hot blast furnaces in North America were erected for it was chosen in 1839 as a mill stream by Erskine Hazard and Josiah White, co-founders of the Lehigh Coal & Navigation Company, along which to establish their new subsidiary: the Lehigh Crane Iron Company with imported Welsh expert David Thomas as superintendent to construct and operate blast furnaces.

The area first appears in the historical record as a manorial deed in William Penn's era, but a surnames analysis by in History of Northampton County, published in 1877, reports that the area was first settled by Irish immigrants in the late 1600 and early 1700s who were later bought out by German immigrants.

By late 1839, Catasauqua Creek was reshaped to begin providing water power for the production of the first North American pig iron. Its production included the use of anthracite iron, which, along with anthracite coal, began flowing down the Lehigh Canal in 1820 and was the foundation for much of the American Industrial Revolution. The first successful anthracite blow and cast of iron occurred in Catasauqua Creek on July 4, 1840. Bartholomew and Metz wrote that:

From that moment on, anthracite and the canals pivotal importance in the industrial development of the United States.

Using anthracite as fuel in its production, iron for the first time became plentiful and inexpensive. For a period of thirty years, three decades that shaped the future of the valley, anthracite fueled furnaces throughout the Lehigh Valley produced greater quantities of iron than any other part of the nation.

— Ann Bartholomew and Lance E. Metz, page 5, Delaware and Lehigh Canals

== Course ==
The creek's source in Northampton is approximately 2,052 feet (625 m) south of Pheasant Drive in the dell between Hilltop and Sickle Roads, approximately 3,530 feet (1,080 m) north of their junction.
Its origin is near Miller State Pond in East Allen Township.

The creek flows through Allen Township, North Catasauqua, and then into Catasauqua, where it flows into the Lehigh Canal and Lehigh River. Along its course, it passes Catasauqua High School and flows through Willowbrook Golf Course in North Catasauqua and through Catasauqua Park.

== Variant names ==
Catasauqua Creek is a left bank tributary entering from the east shore of the historic Lehigh Canal and is sometimes called "Catty Creek".

Numerous historical names for the creek, each registered by the United States Geological Survey, include: Caladaqua Creek, Caladoque Creek, Calandaqua Creek, Calesoque Creek, Calisuk Creek, Catasocque Creek, Coladaque Creek, Colesauque Creek, Colesoque Creek, Colesquque Creek, Collasauque Creek, Gatasaque Creek, Gattoshacki Creek, Gottoschacki Creek, Gottshacki Creek, and Mill Creek.
