= Emanuelsville, Pennsylvania =

Unincorporated community in Pennsylvania, US

- Unincorporated community
- Location within Pennsylvania Location within the United States
- Coordinates: 40°45′37″N 75°27′37″W
- Country: United States
- State: Pennsylvania
- County: Northampton
- Township: Moore Township
- Elevation: 718 ft (219 m)

Population
  - Metro: 865,310 (US: 68th)
- Time zone: UTC-5 (Eastern (EST))
  - Summer (DST): UTC-4 (EDT)
- Area codes: 610 and 484
- GNIS feature ID: 1174209

Emanuelsville is an unincorporated community in Moore Township in Northampton County, Pennsylvania. It is part of the Lehigh Valley metropolitan area, which had a population of 861,899 was the 68th-most populous metropolitan area in the U.S. as of the 2020 census.

Emanuelsville is located at the intersection of Valley View Drive and Hokendaqua Drive.
