= Blue Mountain Community Library =

Public library in Pen Argyl, Pennsylvania

- 40°52′01″N 75°15′14″W
- Location: 216 South Robinson Avenue, Pen Argyl, Pennsylvania, U.S.
- Established: 1990

Access and use
- Members: 11-20

Other information
- Budget: $10,000
- Director: Lisa Faman
- Employees: 9
- Website: bmcl.org

Blue Mountain Community Library is a public library located in Pen Argyl, Pennsylvania. It serves the residents of the Pen Argyl Area School District. The library was established in 1990.

== History ==
The library was established in 1990 and located in the library at Plainfield Elementary School. Later, the library moved to a classroom in the Wind Gap Middle School. Both spaces were donated by the Pen Argyl Area School District. In 1998, Lafayette Bank provided the building at 216 S. Robinson Avenue to the library.

== See also ==
- Easton Area Public Library in Easton, Pennsylvania
- Mary Meuser Memorial Library in Wilson, Pennsylvania
- Memorial Library of Nazareth & Vicinity in Nazareth, Pennsylvania
