= Memorial Library of Nazareth & Vicinity =

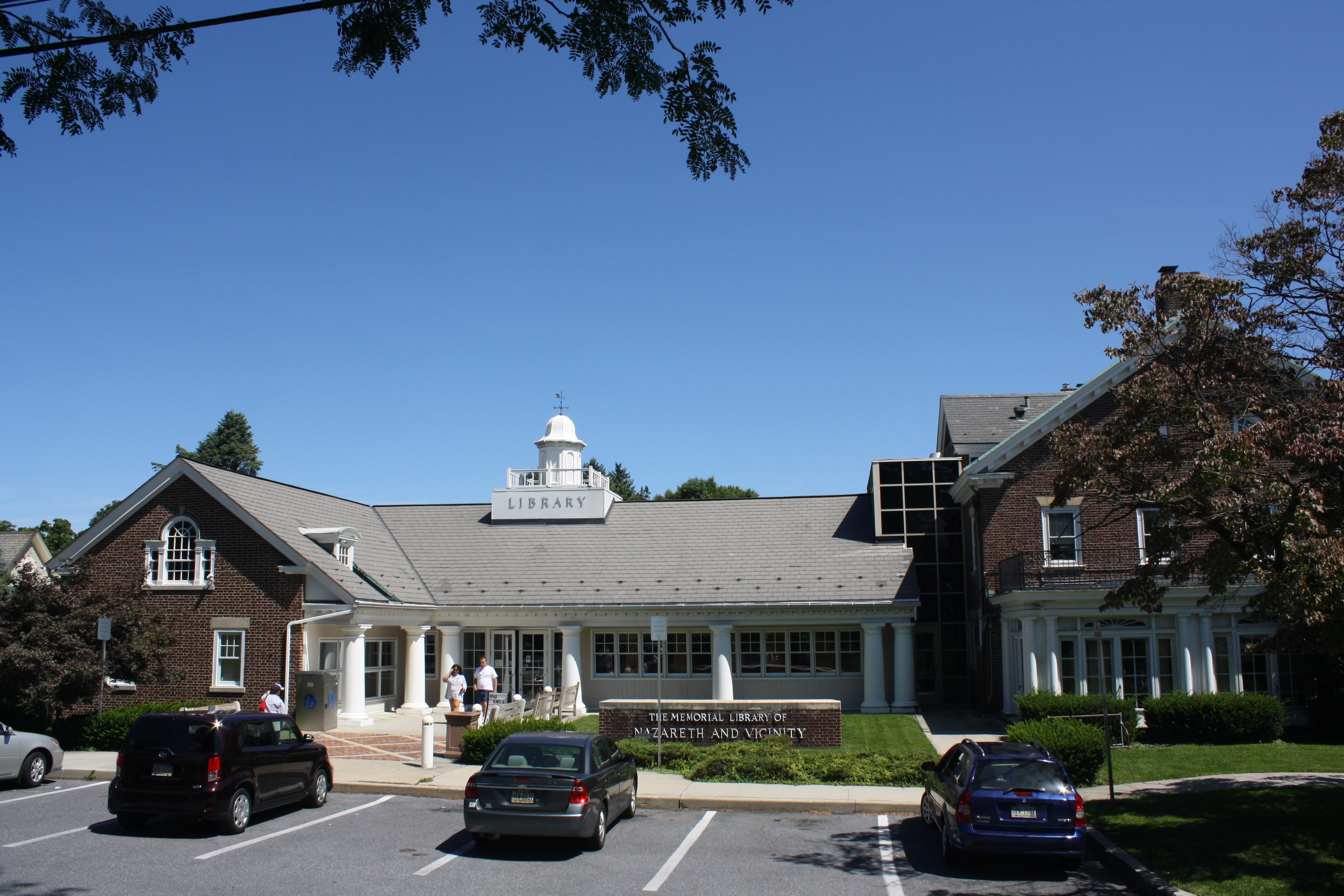
- Memorial Library of Nazareth in August 2013
- 40°44′34″N 75°18′23″W
- Location: 295 East Center Street, Nazareth, Pennsylvania, U.S.
- Established: 1946

Access and use
- Members: 9

Other information
- Budget: $56,000
- Director: Jeff Shephard
- Employees: 16
- Website: www.nazarethlibrary.org

Memorial Library of Nazareth & Vicinity, also known as the Nazareth Memorial Library, is a public library located in Nazareth, Pennsylvania. It serves the borough of Nazareth and the townships of Bushkill, Upper Nazareth, and Lower Nazareth.

The library was established in 1946.

== See also ==
- Blue Mountain Community Library in Pen Argyl, Pennsylvania
- Easton Area Public Library in Easton, Pennsylvania
- Mary Meuser Memorial Library in Wilson, Pennsylvania
