= Mary Meuser Memorial Library =

- 40°41′23″N 75°14′15″W
- Location: 1803 Northampton Street, Wilson, Pennsylvania, 18042, U.S.

Other information
- Director: Daniel Redington
- Employees: 4
- Website: meuserlib.org

Mary Meuser Memorial Library (est. 15 October 1962) is a public library located in Wilson, Pennsylvania. It serves the residents of Wilson Area School District. The library has approximately 50,000 items.

== See also ==
- Blue Mountain Community Library in Pen Argyl, Pennsylvania
- Easton Area Public Library in Easton, Pennsylvania
- Memorial Library of Nazareth & Vicinity in Nazareth, Pennsylvania
