= Hokendauqua Creek =

Tributary of the Lehigh River in Northampton County, Pennsylvania

Coordinates: 40.78890°N 75.44506°W

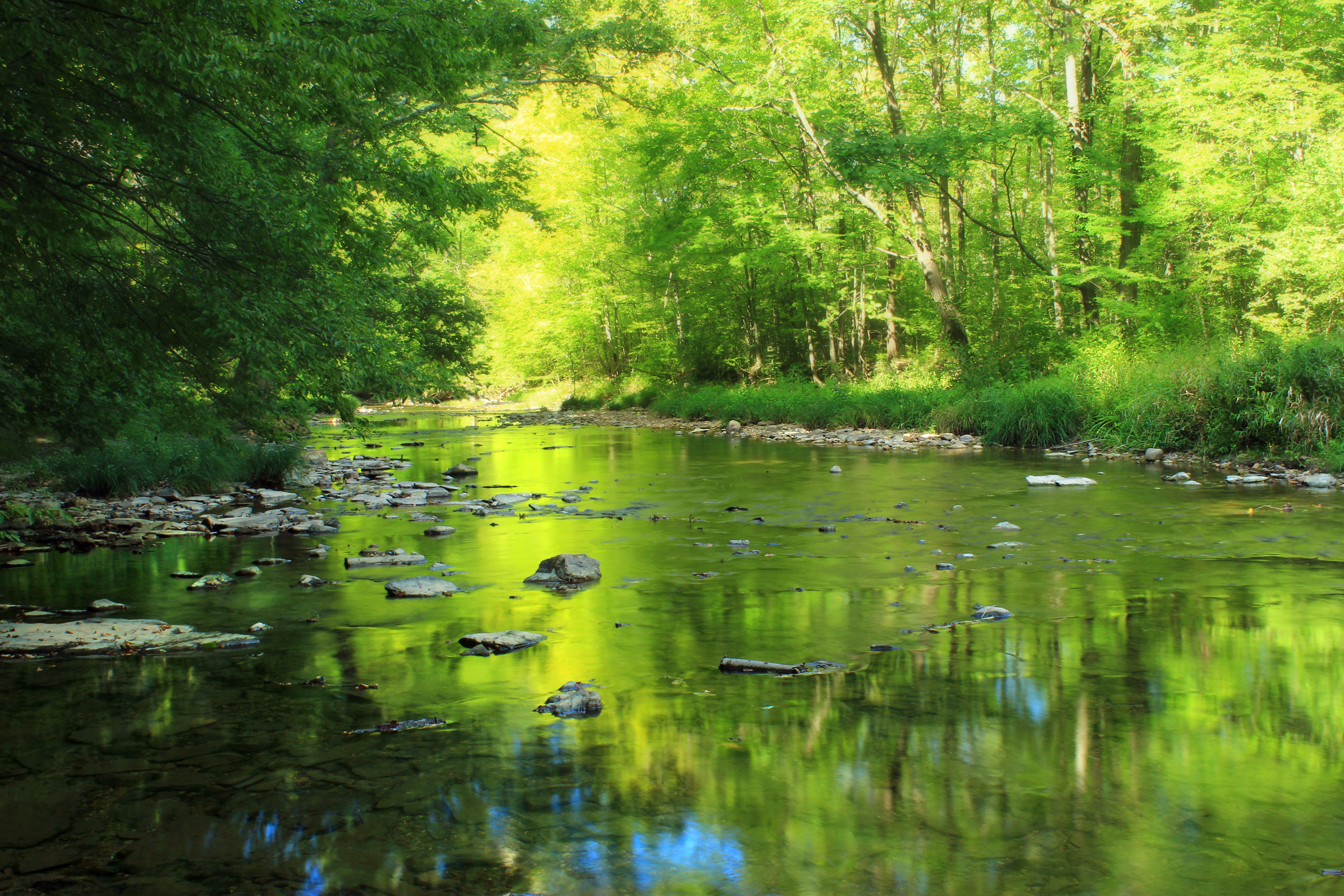
Hokendauqua Creek

Hokendauqua Creek is a 17.0-mile-long (27.4 km) tributary of the Lehigh River in Northampton County, Pennsylvania in the United States.

Hokendauqua Creek joins the Lehigh River at Northampton.

== See also ==
- List of rivers of Pennsylvania
