= Northampton Area School District =

School district in Pennsylvania

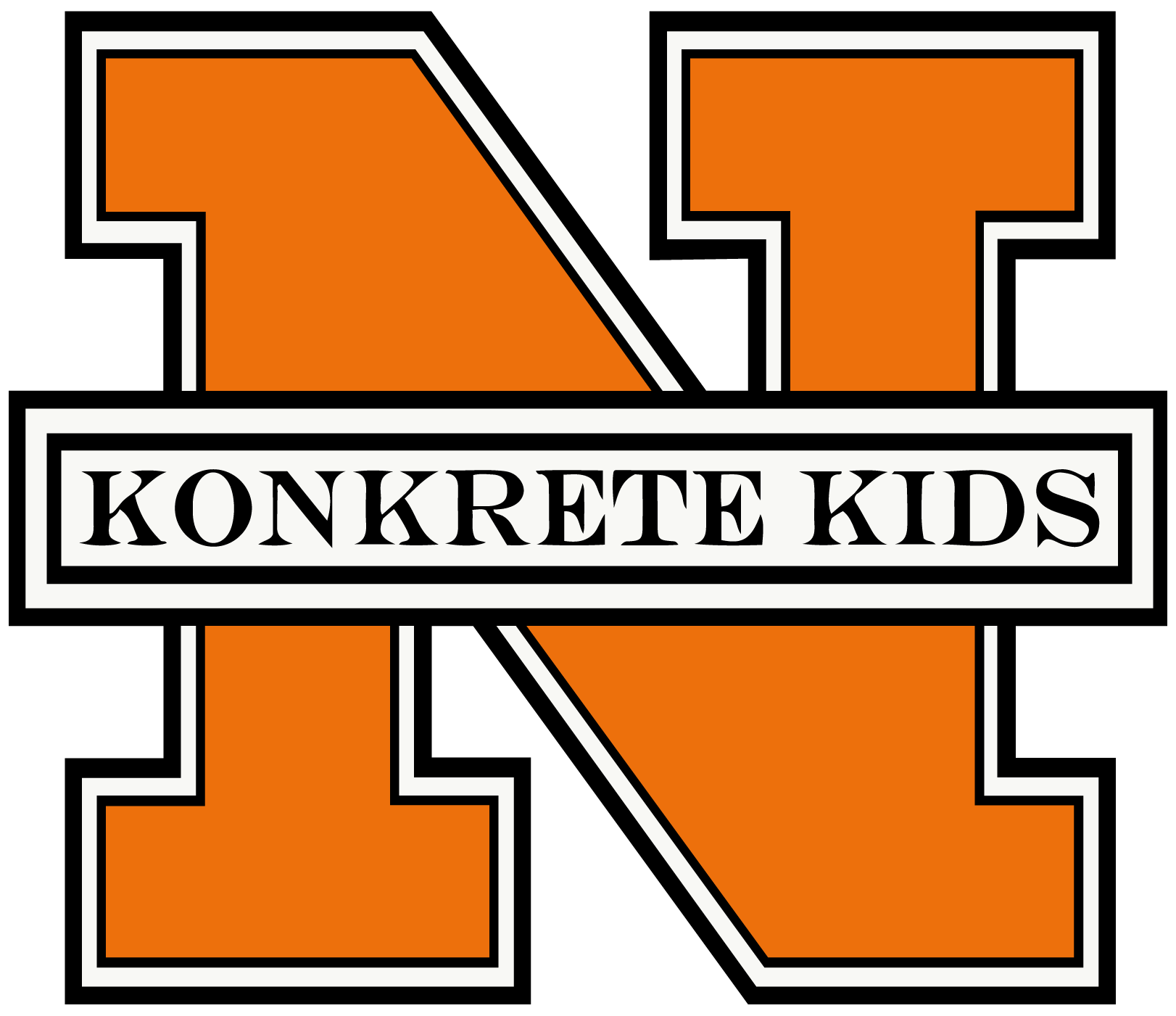

Address
- 2014 Laubach Avenue Northampton, Northampton County, Pennsylvania, 18067; United States

District information
- Type: Public
- Motto: Learn, Listen, and Lead
- Schools: Six, including Northampton Area High School
- Budget: $123.479 million
- NCES District ID: 4217370

Students and staff
- Students: 5,124 (2024-25)
- Faculty: 367.00 (on an FTE basis)
- Student–teacher ratio: 13.96
- Athletic conference: Eastern Pennsylvania Conference
- District mascot: Koncrete Kids
- Colors: Black and Orange

Other information
- Website: www.nasdschools.org

Northampton Area School District is a public school district located in Northampton County, Pennsylvania in the Lehigh Valley region of eastern Pennsylvania.

Students in ninth through 12th grades attend Northampton Area High School in Northampton. Students in grades six through eight attend Northampton Area Middle School, and the district maintains four elementary schools, Northampton Borough, George Wolf, Lehigh, and Moore, for kindergarten through fifth grade. As of the 2024–25 school year, the school district had a total enrollment of 5,124 students between all six of its schools, according to National Center for Education Statistics data.

Northampton Area School District is located in the heart of the Lehigh Valley. Covering 97.3 square miles (252 km^{2}) in Northampton County, the school district serves three boroughs, Bath, Chapman, and Northampton, and four townships, Allen, East Allen, Lehigh, and Moore. The population of the district is over 38,500.

The school district is located 10 miles (16 km) from the cities of Allentown and Bethlehem, 70 miles (110 km) from Philadelphia and 90 miles (140 km) from New York City. Major roadways include the Pennsylvania Turnpike Northeast Extension, Interstate 78, Route 22, Route 145, Route 329, and Route 248.

The borough of Northampton was the location of the former cement giant, The Atlas Portland Cement Company.

== High school ==
Northampton Area High School is located in the borough of Northampton, Pennsylvania. Enrollment is approximately 1,800 students for 9th through 12th grades. The average graduating class is 430 students. The high school was constructed in 1963.

== Middle school ==
The Northampton Area Middle School is located in the Borough of Northampton. Enrollment is approximately 1800 students in 6th, 7th and 8th grades.

== Elementary schools ==
Northampton Area School District has five elementary school buildings to comprise four elementary schools, Northampton Borough, George Wolf, Lehigh, and Moore, for kindergarten through fifth grade.

Total elementary school enrollment in the school district is approximately 2,900.

== Schools ==
- Northampton Area High School
- Northampton Area Middle School
- George Wolf Elementary School
- Lehigh Elementary School
- Moore Elementary School
- Northampton Borough Elementary School
