= Northampton Area High School =

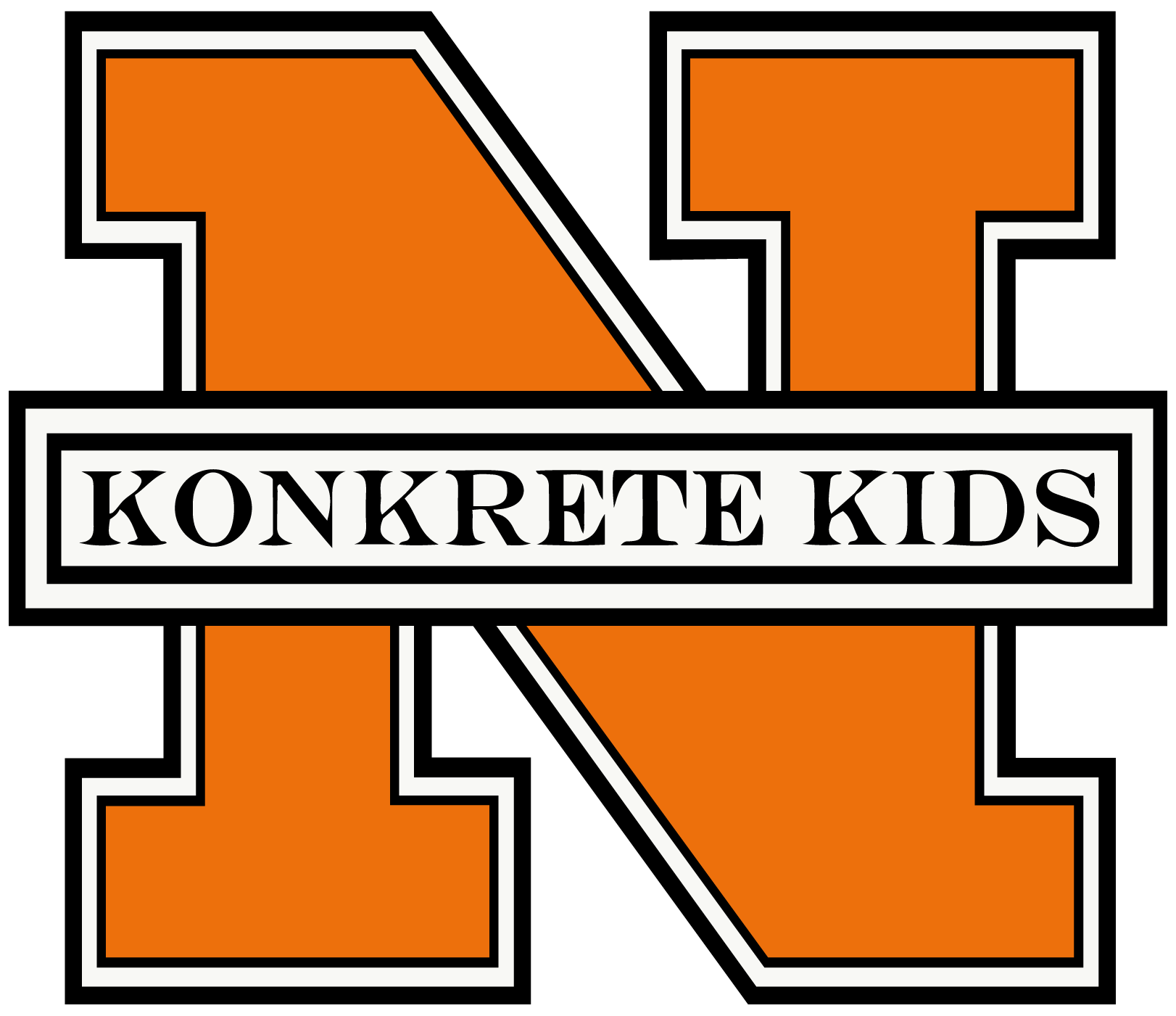

Location
- 1619 Laubach Avenue, Northampton, Pennsylvania; United States
- Coordinates: 40.6880°N 75.4900°W

Information
- Type: Public high school
- School district: Northampton Area School District
- NCES School ID: 421737003505
- Principal: Luke Shafnisky
- Staff: 116.10 (on an FTE basis)
- Grades: 9th–12th
- Enrollment: 1,866 (2024–2025)
- Student to teacher ratio: 16.07
- Campus type: Suburb: Large
- Colors: Black and orange
- Athletics conference: Eastern Pennsylvania Conference
- Mascot: Konkrete Kids
- Rival: Catasauqua High School
- Website: www.nasdschools.org/o/nahs

Northampton Area High School is a public high school in the Northampton Area School District and located in Northampton, Pennsylvania in the Lehigh Valley metropolitan area of eastern Pennsylvania.

As of the 2024–25 school year, the school had 1,866 students and 116.10 teachers on an FTE basis for a student-teacher ratio of 16.07, according to National Center for Education Statistics data. The high school was renovated in 2008 to help accommodate Northampton's growing population.

== Academics and extracurricular activities ==
Northampton Area High School offers programs of studies in advanced placement, honors, college preparatory, applied academics, and vocational andtechnical studies through the Bethlehem Area Vocational-Technical School.

Co-curricular activities round out academics and include athletics, mock trial club, band, chess team, chorus, debate, DECA, drama, FBLA, French club, Kids for Christ, Gay-Straight Alliance, German club, marching band, orchestra, peer helpers, Science Olympiad, Scholastic Scrimmage, Spanish club, student council, and yearbook. The school newspaper is Koncrete Kourier. The peer helper program at the school has received national recognition and numerous awards for its focus on assisting students with special needs. At-risk, alternative education, Student Assistance Program (SAP), and counseling services are provided at the secondary level.

== Athletics ==
Northampton Area High School competes athletically in the Eastern Pennsylvania Conference (EPC) in the District XI division of the Pennsylvania Interscholastic Athletic Association, one of the premier high school athletic divisions in the nation. The school's athletic teams are known as the "Konkrete Kids", which references Northampton's tradition as a large U.S. manufacturer of cement.

The school is particularly well known for its successful wrestling program, which has periodically been ranked among the nation's best, and for its continuing football tradition with crosstown rival, Catasauqua High School. The tradition has been running for 92 years. The annual Turkey Day game is held on Thanksgiving.

Northampton Area High School is one of eleven Lehigh Valley-area high schools with an ice hockey team. The team competes in the Lehigh Valley Scholastic Ice Hockey League. Northampton Ice Hockey is frequently one of the top ranked teams in the area and has won the LVSHL District Championship five times.

Northampton High School holds the record for the most Lehigh Valley Conference championships in girls tennis and wrestling. The school holds the fifth most Lehigh Valley Conference championships in all sports, behind Parkland High School, Emmaus High School, Easton Area High School, and Allentown Central Catholic High School.

Northampton High School is widely known for having one of the best wrestling programs in the nation. Holding two national titles, seven PIAA state team championships, and 21 individual state champions at various weight classes, Northampton is one of the leading schools in Pennsylvania wrestling history.

The school's wrestling team was ranked first in the nation in 1992-93 and 1993–94, third in the nation in the 2008–2009 season, 32nd in the nation in 2016–17, and 23rd in the nation in 2018–2019.

=== Pennsylvania state championships ===
Northampton has won PIAA state championships in the following sports and seasons:

- Girls softball: 1996
- Wrestling: 1993, 1994, 1995, 1998, 2000, 2003, 2004
- Boys Swimming: 1993

=== District XI championships ===
Northampton has won PIAA District 11 championships in the following sports and seasons:

- Baseball: 1938, 1963, 1968, 1982, 1986, 1989, 1997
- Boys Basketball: 1937, 1972
- Girls Basketball: 1995, 1997, 2010, 2011, 2019
- Girls Cross Country: 1987
- Golf: 2012
- Softball: 1979, 1985, 1986, 1996, 2013, 2021, 2022
- Girls Tennis: 2003, 2004
- Boys Volleyball: 2022
- Wrestling: 1953, 1988, 1993, 1994, 1998, 1999, 2008, 2009, 2019
- Ping Pong: 2000, 2001

=== Eastern Conference Champions ===
- Football: 2006
- Ice Hockey: 1997, 2003, 2021, 2023, 2024
- Baseball: 1997, 1998, 2019
- Boys Soccer: 2023

== Notable alumni ==
- Jim Druckenmiller, former professional football player, Indianapolis Colts, Miami Dolphins, and San Francisco 49ers
- Jenn Gotzon, actress, Tricia Nixon in Frost Nixon
- Dennis Onkotz, former professional football player, New York Jets and 1995 College Football Hall of Fame inductee
- Steve Pritko, former professional football player, Green Bay Packers, Los Angeles Rams, and New York Giants
- Brian Schneider, former professional baseball player, Montreal Expos, New York Mets, and Philadelphia Phillies
- Jennifer Storm, author, Blackout Girl: Growing Up and Drying Out in America and Leave the Light On
- Walt Zirinsky, former professional football player, Cleveland Rams and 1945 NFL champion
