= Northampton, Pennsylvania =

Borough in Pennsylvania, US

Northampton
- Borough
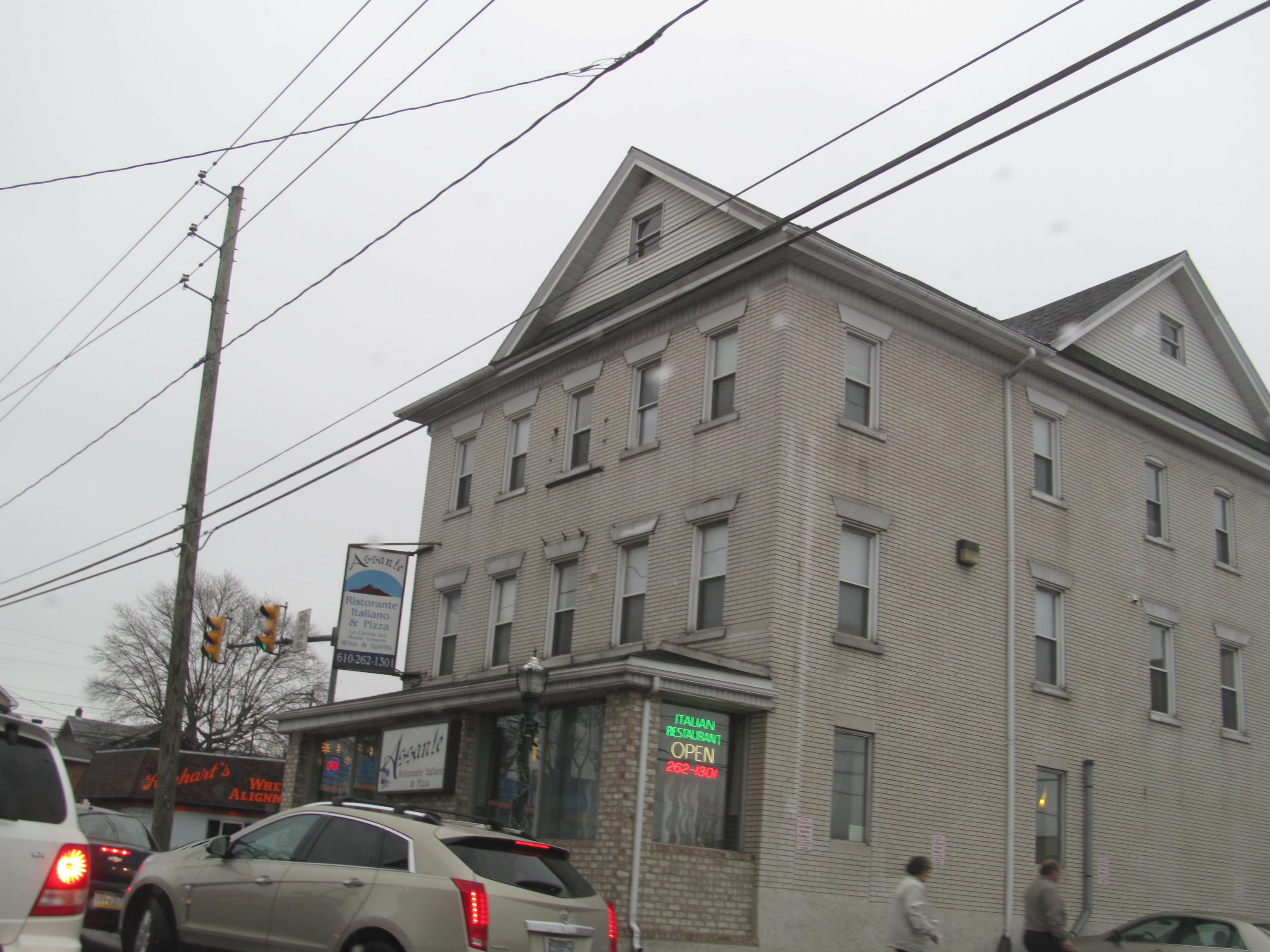
- Northampton in December 2012

- Seal

- Location of Northampton in Northampton County, Pennsylvania (left) and of Northampton County in Pennsylvania (right)

- Location of Northampton in Pennsylvania Northampton (the United States)
- Coordinates: 40°41′02″N 75°29′29″W
- Country: United States
- State: Pennsylvania
- County: Northampton

Government
  - Mayor: Anthony Pristash (R)

Area
  - Borough: 2.64 sq mi (6.83 km^{2})
  - Land: 2.47 sq mi (6.40 km^{2})
  - Water: 0.17 sq mi (0.43 km^{2})
- Elevation: 328 ft (100 m)

Population (2020)
  - Borough: 10,395
  - Density: 4,207.6/sq mi (1,624.56/km^{2})
  - Metro: 865,310 (US: 68th)
  - Metro density: 9,888/sq mi (3,818/km^{2})
- Time zone: UTC-5 (EST)
  - Summer (DST): UTC-4 (EDT)
- ZIP Code: 18067
- Area codes: 610 and 484
- FIPS code: 42-54696
- Primary airport: Lehigh Valley International Airport
- Major hospital: Lehigh Valley Hospital–Cedar Crest
- School district: Northampton Area
- Website: www.northamptonboro.com

Northampton is a borough in Northampton County, Pennsylvania, United States. Its population was 10,395 as of the 2020 census. Northampton is located 7.8 miles (12.6 km) north of Allentown, 66.7 miles (107.3 km) northwest of Philadelphia, and 93.8 miles (151.0 km) west of New York City.

The borough is part of the Lehigh Valley metropolitan area, which had a population of 861,899 and was the 68th-most populous metropolitan area in the U.S. as of the 2020 census.

== History ==
Northampton was created from the villages of Siegfried, Newport, and Stemton, which unified to form Northampton in 1902.

Due to the limestone formations in the region, Northampton became a global center for the manufacturing of cement. Atlas Portland Cement Company, the largest such company in the world for much of the 20th century, operated in Northampton from 1895 to 1982. It produced some eight million barrels of cement for construction of the Panama Canal, which included most of the cement used on the canal's construction. In 1909, Atlas petitioned county courts to change the alliance into a borough, reportedly because the change would make it easier for the company to send and receive mail.

During the 1940s and 1950s, Northampton hosted the Northampton County Fair, which was held annually and spread out across the Lappawinzo Fish and Game Club property north of Northampton off Kreidersville Road. There were large numbers of vendor stands, fair rides, animals, shows, performances, 4-H Club judgings, and Ringling Brothers and Barnum and Bailey shows. Visitors came from all over the East Coast to attend the two-week event, and hourly buses ran from downtown Northampton and nearby cities to the fair.

Atlas was bought by another company in 1980 and ceased its Northampton operations in 1982; the last smokestack was demolished in 1993. Current technology and automation mean that the cement industry can manufacture a great amount of product with 150-200 workers, rather than the thousands who were required to work in these plants in the first half of the 20th century.

Borough residents, many of them former Atlas employees or their descendants, still identify strongly with the company and its history. For example, the Northampton Area School District mascot is the "Konkrete Kid." Historical community events include the Northampton Jack Frost Parade every October before Halloween, celebrating the onset of winter. It includes marching bands and floats.

The Atlas Memorial Cement Museum was opened in 1997 in Northampton. It was founded by Edward Pany, who worked at the company in summers during the 1950s. His father, an immigrant from Austria, worked all his life at Atlas. Immigrant workers from Poland, Ukraine, and other eastern European nations also worked there. The museum commemorates the importance of the cement industry and Atlas Cement to the area.

== Geography ==
Northampton is located 8 miles (13 km) north of Allentown and 15 miles (24 km) west of Easton at 40°41′2″N 75°29′29″W (40.683896, -75.491353).

According to the U.S. Census Bureau, the borough has a total area of 2.7 square miles (7.0 km^{2}); 2.6 square miles (6.7 km^{2}) is land and 0.1 square miles (0.26 km^{2}) (3.70%), water. Northampton's elevation is 370 feet (110 m) above sea level.

The Lehigh River, which separates Northampton County from Lehigh County, forms the borough's western border.

Northampton has a hot summer humid continental climate (Dfa) and average monthly temperatures range from 28.8 °F in January to 73.7 °F in July. The local hardiness zone is 6b.

== Government ==
The governing body consists of a borough manager, an assistant borough manager, and eight council members (two from each ward), who are elected by the residents of the borough.

== Demographics ==
Historical population
Census	Pop.	Note	%±
1800	573		—
1810	710		23.9%
1830	1,544		—
1910	8,729		—
1920	9,349		7.1%
1930	9,839		5.2%
1940	9,622		−2.2%
1950	9,332		−3.0%
1960	8,866		−5.0%
1970	8,389		−5.4%
1980	8,240		−1.8%
1990	8,717		5.8%
2000	9,405		7.9%
2010	9,926		5.5%
2020	10,395		4.7%

=== 2020 census ===
As of the 2020 census, Northampton had a population of 10,395. The median age was 41.1 years. 21.5% of residents were under the age of 18 and 18.0% of residents were 65 years of age or older. For every 100 females there were 93.9 males, and for every 100 females age 18 and over there were 90.2 males age 18 and over.

100.0% of residents lived in urban areas, while 0.0% lived in rural areas.

There were 4,321 households in Northampton, of which 29.3% had children under the age of 18 living in them. Of all households, 43.6% were married-couple households, 19.3% were households with a male householder and no spouse or partner present, and 28.8% were households with a female householder and no spouse or partner present. About 29.7% of all households were made up of individuals and 13.3% had someone living alone who was 65 years of age or older.

There were 4,523 housing units, of which 4.5% were vacant. The homeowner vacancy rate was 0.5% and the rental vacancy rate was 5.6%.

Racial composition as of the 2020 census
Race	Number	Percent
White	9,047	87.0%
Black or African American	308	3.0%
American Indian and Alaska Native	13	0.1%
Asian	87	0.8%
Native Hawaiian and Other Pacific Islander	1	0.0%
Some other race	353	3.4%
Two or more races	586	5.6%
Hispanic or Latino (of any race)	965	9.3%

=== 2000 census ===
At the 2000 census, there were 9,405 people, 3,869 households, and 2,634 families residing in the borough. The population density was 3,619.1 inhabitants per square mile (1,397.3/km^{2}). There were 4,023 housing units at an average density of 1,548.1 per square mile (597.7/km^{2}). The racial makeup of the borough was 98.21% White, 0.35% African American, 0.05% Native American, 0.44% Asian, 0.39% from other races, and 0.55% from two or more races. Hispanic or Latino of any race were 1.74%.

There were 3,869 households, 30.3% had children under the age of 18 living with them, 53.3% were married couples living together, 10.3% had a female householder with no husband present, and 31.9% were non-families. 27.4% of households were made up of individuals, and 14.3% were one person aged 65 or older. The average household size was 2.40 and the average family size was 2.92.

In the borough, the population was spread out, with 22.4% under the age of 18, 5.8% from 18 to 24, 32.2% from 25 to 44, 21.0% from 45 to 64, and 18.6% 65 or older. The median age was 39 years. For every 100 females there were 91.4 males. For every 100 females age 18 and over, there were 86.1 males. The median household income was $40,982 and the median family income was $49,482. Males had a median income of $37,033 versus $26,422 for females. The per capita income for the borough was $19,516. About 1.3% of families and 3.7% of the population were below the poverty line, including 1.4% of those under age 18 and 5.9% of those age 65 or over.

== In popular culture ==
Part of the opening sequence of the 1992 film School Ties was filmed in downtown Northampton due to the town's preservation of older buildings, which fit with the 1950s setting of the film.

== Transportation ==
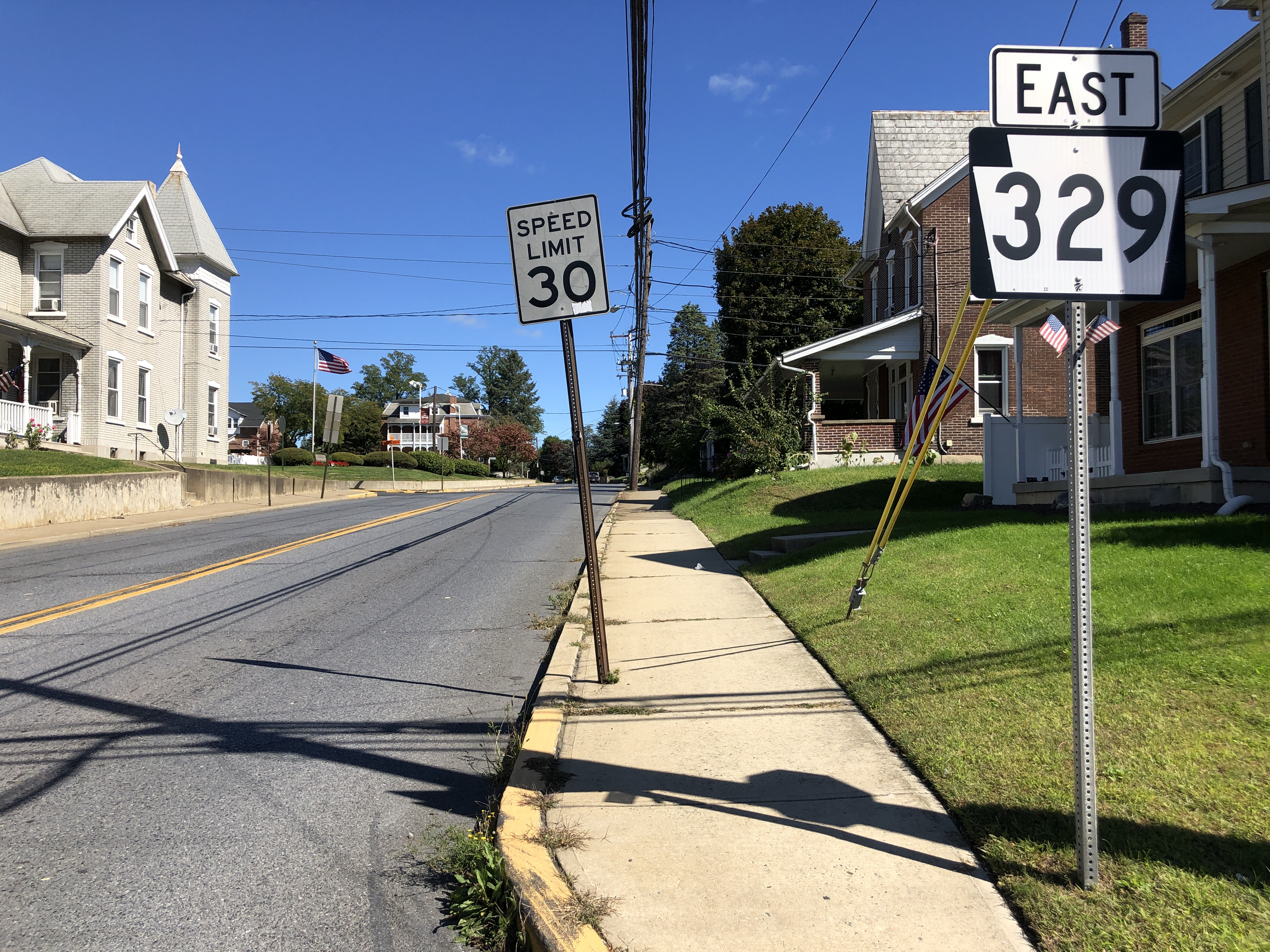
PA Route 329 East in Northampton

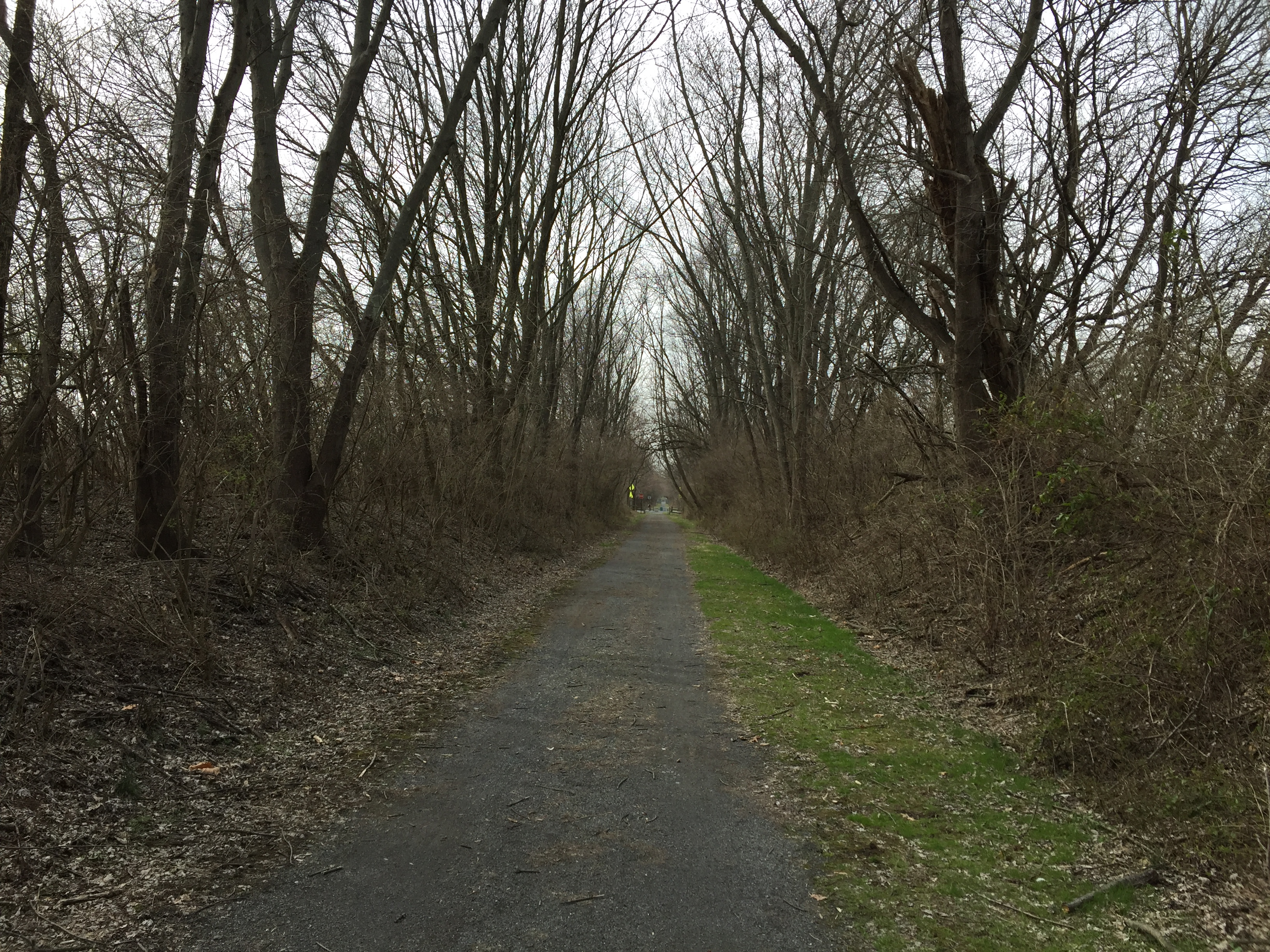
Nor-Bath Trail, facing Northampton

As of 2012, there were 35.90 miles (57.78 km) of public roads in Northampton, of which 2.09 miles (3.36 km) were maintained by the Pennsylvania Department of Transportation (PennDOT) and 33.81 miles (54.41 km) were maintained by the borough.

Pennsylvania Route 329 is the only numbered highway serving Northampton. It follows 21st Street along a southwest–northeast alignment through the middle of the borough.

The Nor-Bath Trail is a multi-use rail-trail that follows the route of the former Northampton and Bath Railroad, with its western terminus in downtown Northampton. The Delaware and Lehigh (D&L) Trail also runs through Northampton.

== Education ==
The borough is served by the Northampton Area School District. Students in grades nine through 12 attend Northampton Area High School in the borough. There are four elementary schools and one middle school.

The borough is also home to Good Shepherd Catholic School in the 4th Ward, which serves grades Pre-K to 8th grade and is part of the Diocese of Allentown.

== Museums ==
- Atlas Cement Memorial Museum, based in Northampton

== Notable people ==
- Dorothy Page, former actress

== Sister city ==
- Stegersbach, Austria
