= Pennsylvania Route 248 =

State highway in Pennsylvania, US

Pennsylvania Route 248

Route information
- Maintained by PennDOT
- Length: 31.285 mi (50.348 km)
- Existed: May 9, 1966–present

Major junctions
- West end: US 209 in Weissport East
- PA 895 in Bowmanstown; PA 873 in Lehigh Township; PA 145 in Lehigh Township; PA 946 in Lehigh Township; PA 329 / PA 987 in Bath; PA 512 in Bath; PA 946 in Upper Nazareth Township; PA 191 in Nazareth; PA 33 in Lower Nazareth Township; US 22 in Wilson
- East end: US 22 / PA 611 in Easton

Location
- Country: United States
- State: Pennsylvania
- Counties: Carbon, Northampton

Highway system
- Pennsylvania State Route System; Interstate; US; State; Scenic; Legislative
| ← PA 247 | → PA 249 |

Pennsylvania Route 248 (PA 248) is a 31.3 mi (50.4 km) long state highway in the eastern part of the U.S. state of Pennsylvania. The western terminus of the route is at U.S. Route 209 (US 209) in Weissport East, a CDP in Franklin Township. The eastern terminus is at PA 611 in Easton. The route begins at US 209 in Carbon County and heads southeast parallel to the Lehigh River as a four-lane divided highway to Bowmanstown, where it becomes a freeway and heads through Palmerton. Upon crossing Lehigh Gap in Blue Mountain, PA 248 enters Northampton County and becomes a two-lane undivided highway that heads southeast through rural areas, serving Bath and Nazareth. From here, the route runs southeast through suburban areas to Wilson, where it turns east and follows city streets through Easton.

The portion of road between Weissport and Lehigh Gap was originally designated as part of US 309 when the U.S. Highway System in 1926. In 1927, PA 45 was designated and ran between Weissport and Easton, running concurrent with US 309 before turning south from the Lehigh Gap along the Lehigh River to Northampton and then east to Bath. The route was moved to a more direct alignment between Lehigh Gap and Bath a year later. PA 45 originally had its eastern terminus in Easton at US 22 at the intersection of 13th and Northampton Streets in Easton.

The route was extended east along Northampton Street to the Northampton Street Bridge over the Delaware River following the rerouting of US 22 to a freeway in 1955. In the 1950s, PA 29 replaced the US 309 designation concurrent with PA 45 between Weissport and Lehigh Gap. In 1961, PA 29/PA 45 was upgraded to a divided highway, with the portion between Bowmanstown and Lehigh Gap built as a freeway. PA 248 was designated to its current alignment on May 9, 1966, replacing the PA 29 and PA 45 designations.

== Route description ==
=== Carbon County ===
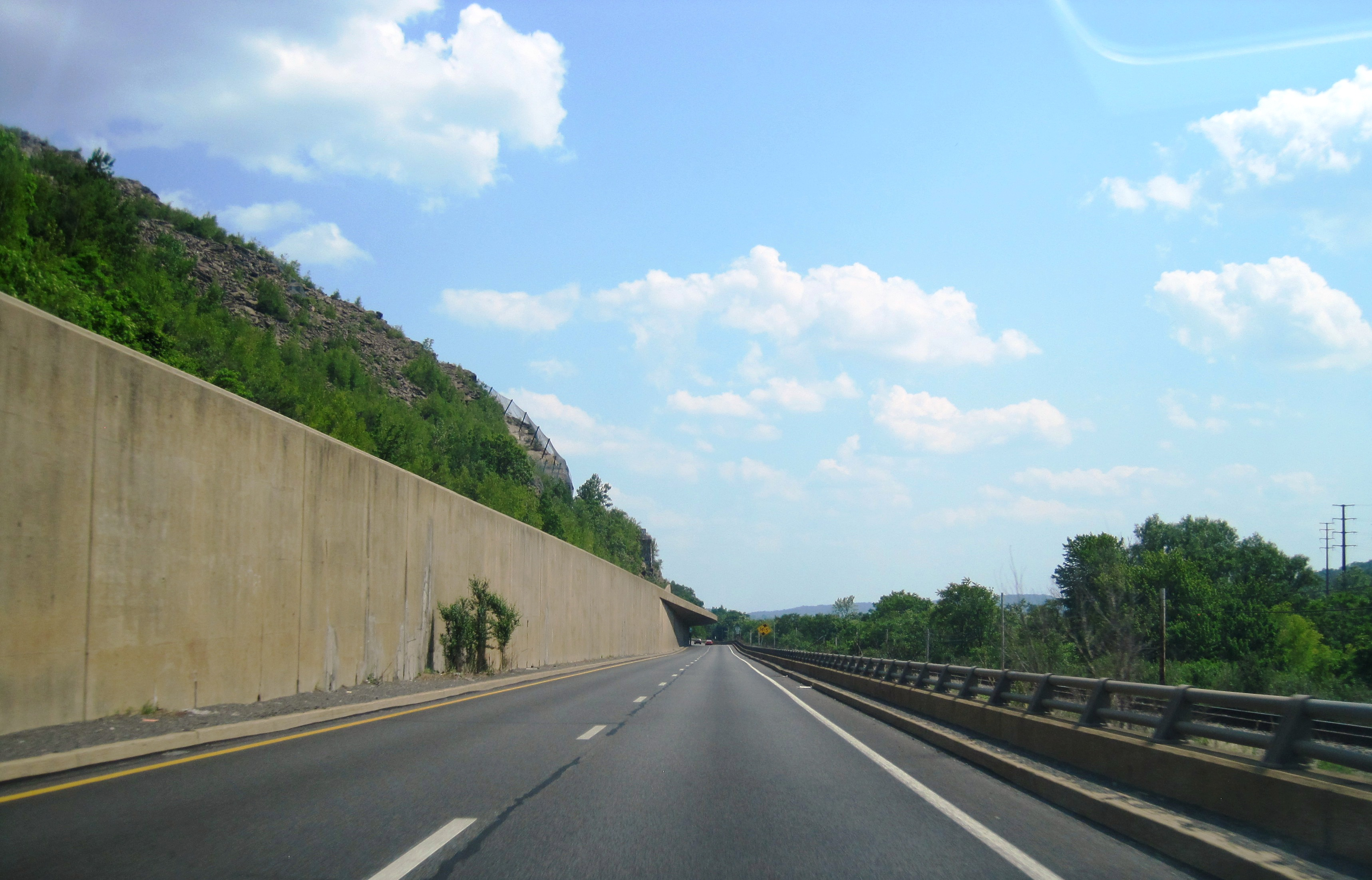
PA 248 eastbound through the Lehigh Gap in Lower Towamensing Township showing the westbound lanes cantilevered over the eastbound lanes

PA 248 begins at an intersection with US 209 near the borough of Weissport in Carbon County, where the road continues north as Canal Street. From this intersection, the route heads southeast as a four-lane divided highway called the POW/MIA Remembrance Highway, passing near residential areas in Weissport East as it passes through Franklin Township a short distance to the east of the border with Weissport. The road continues southeast and runs between commercial areas to the northeast and parallel to the Lehigh River and Norfolk Southern's Lehigh Line to the southwest. PA 248 enters the borough of Parryville and curves to the east-southeast, passing under Interstate 476 (Pennsylvania Turnpike Northeast Extension) before it reaches an intersection with Center Street that heads north to provide access to Parryville.

After this, the route heads southeast and crosses the Pohopoco Creek, at which point it enters Lower Towamensing Township and curves south through forested areas parallel to the Lehigh River and the Norfolk Southern railroad tracks. The road heads into the borough of Bowmanstown and intersects a westbound entrance ramp from the borough before it passes over the railroad tracks. PA 248 curves southeast and passes near residential and commercial areas, reaching an eastbound right-in/right-out intersection with the eastern terminus of PA 895. Past this, the highway comes to a westbound exit ramp to Bank Street that provides access to Bowmanstown and PA 895 from the westbound direction.

The route becomes a freeway and heads southeast through wooded areas between Mauch Chunk Road and the Norfolk Southern line to the northeast and the Lehigh River to the southwest, crossing into the borough of Palmerton. PA 248 heads east and northeast alongside the river, with Mauch Chunk Road and the railroad tracks heading farther north. The freeway comes to a trumpet interchange with Delaware Avenue that provides access to Palmerton, where it briefly enters East Penn Township, and curves southeast, heading back into Lower Towamensing Township and passing over the Norfolk Southern tracks again. The route continues through wooded areas with the railroad tracks and the Lehigh River parallel to the southwest, crossing the Aquashicola Creek before it traverses the Lehigh Gap, where the Blue Mountain ridge is located. Within the Lehigh Gap, the westbound lanes of the highway are elevated over the eastbound lanes.

=== Northampton County ===
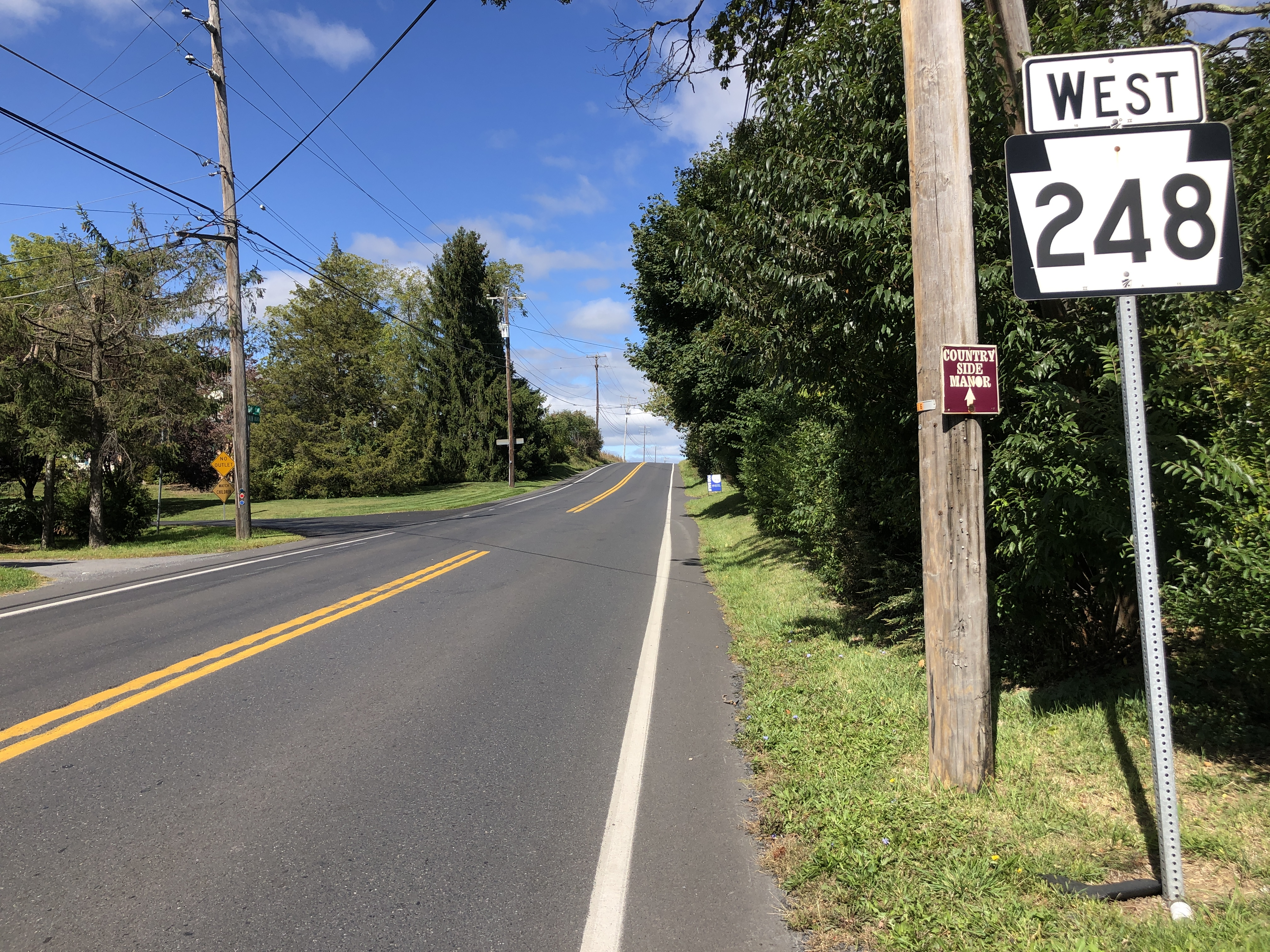
PA 248 westbound in East Allen Township

Upon passing through the Lehigh Gap, PA 248 enters Lehigh Township in Northampton County, which is in the Lehigh Valley, and the freeway ends upon intersecting the northern terminus of PA 873 in Weiders Crossing. At this point, the Appalachian Trail begins following PA 248. A short distance later, the route intersects the northern terminus of PA 145, at which point it turns southeast away from the Lehigh River and narrows to a two-lane undivided road called Lehigh Drive, with the Appalachian Trail heading to the northeast. The road passes through forests before continuing into a mix of farmland, woods, and development. PA 248 intersects the western terminus of PA 946 in Berlinsville and continues through rural areas with some development. The route passes through Indianland before it reaches Cherryville, where it intersects Blue Mountain Drive. The road winds east through a mix of farms, trees, and residences, passing through Pennsville. PA 248 heads into Moore Township and continues through rural land as Pheasant Drive, crossing the Hokendauqua Creek and passing through Beersville before curving southeast at Dannersville.

The route enters East Allen Township and passes a mix of residential areas and farmland as West Main Boulevard, curving to the east. PA 248 continues into the borough of Bath and becomes West Main Street, lined with homes. The road curves southeast and intersects PA 987 and the eastern terminus of PA 329 at Race Street. At this point, PA 987 joins PA 248 for a concurrency on West Main Street, crossing the Monocacy Creek. A block later, the two routes turn north onto South Chestnut Street, passing homes. At the Northampton Street intersection, PA 248 splits to the east on Northampton Street and PA 987 continues north on North Chestnut Street. A block past PA 987, the route crosses PA 512 and continues through residential areas.

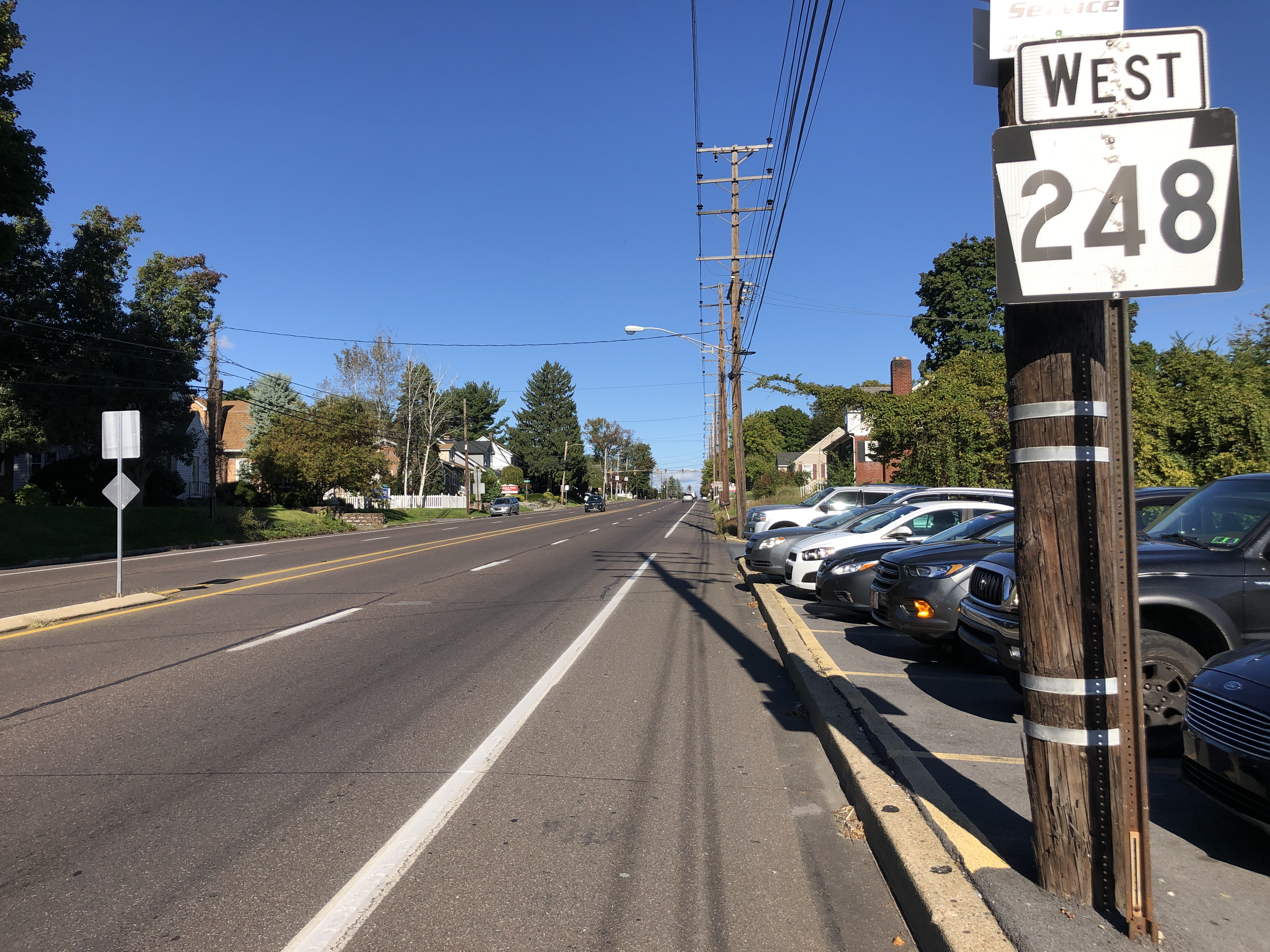
PA 248 westbound past US 22 in Palmer Township

PA 248 leaves Bath for Upper Nazareth Township, where the name becomes Bath Pike. (PA 248 east of Bath was previously routed along East Main Street and Newburg Road to the intersection with Nazareth Road.) The route passes to the north of Penn-Dixie Pond before it continues through agricultural areas with some residential and commercial development. The road passes through Penn Allen and Tadmor before it crosses PA 946 in Christian Springs. Past this intersection, PA 248 passes near a few homes before it runs between two quarries. The road forms the border between the borough of Nazareth to the north and Upper Nazareth Township passes to the south of a cement plant and crosses Norfolk Southern's Cement Secondary.

The route becomes the border between Nazareth to the north and Lower Nazareth Township to the south as it runs between another cement plant to the north and the abandoned Nazareth Speedway to the south. PA 248 heads into commercial areas and intersects PA 191, at which point that route turns east to join PA 248 along Easton Road, with the road fully entering the borough of Nazareth. PA 191 splits to the north towards the center of Nazareth while PA 248 heads southeast along Easton-Nazareth Highway and continues into Lower Nazareth Township, passing between a cement plant to the northeast and a mix of farmland and commercial development to the southwest. The road runs between a couple warehouses and businesses to the northeast and farms and homes to the southwest before it widens into a four-lane divided highway and reaches an interchange with the PA 33 freeway.

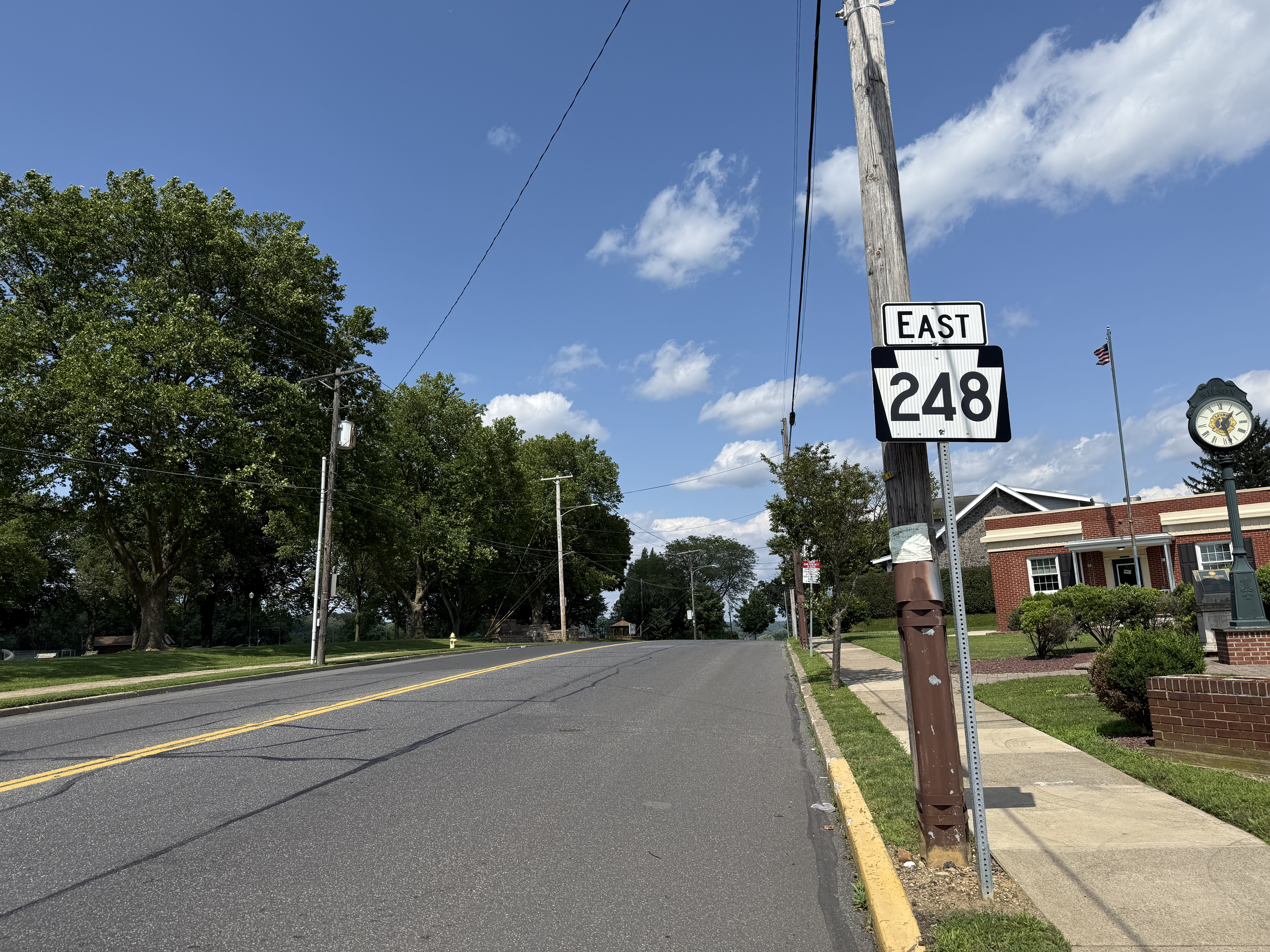
PA 248 eastbound in Wilson

Past this interchange, PA 248 passes by shopping centers before it crosses into Palmer Township. The route becomes Nazareth Road, a three-lane road with a center left-turn lane, and passes commercial development before running between farmland and businesses to the northeast and residential neighborhoods to the southwest. The road heads past more suburban neighborhoods before it curves south into a commercial area as a two-lane road and passes to the west of the Palmer Park Mall. PA 248 turns southwest and widens to four lanes, passing homes in Palmer Park and Palmer Heights. The route becomes a divided highway and heads into commercial areas, where it reaches an interchange with the westbound lanes of the US 22 freeway. PA 248 turns east onto four-lane divided Northampton Street, with 25th Street heading south to provide access to the eastbound lanes of US 22.

A short distance later, the road crosses under US 22 and enters the borough of Wilson, where it passes more businesses before narrowing into a two-lane undivided road and heading through residential areas. The route runs past more homes and a few businesses, entering the city of Easton at the 15th Street intersection. PA 248 is lined with homes as it continues east through the city to the 7th Street intersection. Here, the route turns north briefly on 7th Street before heading northeast on Prospect Avenue. PA 248 turns east onto Pearl Street and runs between the Bushkill Creek to the north and neighborhoods to the south, passing through wooded areas. The route turns east onto Bushkill Street and runs between the US 22 freeway to the north and urban neighborhoods to the south, with a ramp from eastbound US 22 at 4th Street and a ramp to eastbound US 22 at 2nd Street. PA 248 curves south and becomes Larry Holmes Drive, reaching its eastern terminus at PA 611 a block later. Past this intersection, Larry Holmes Drive continues south as part of PA 611 parallel to the Delaware River.

== History ==
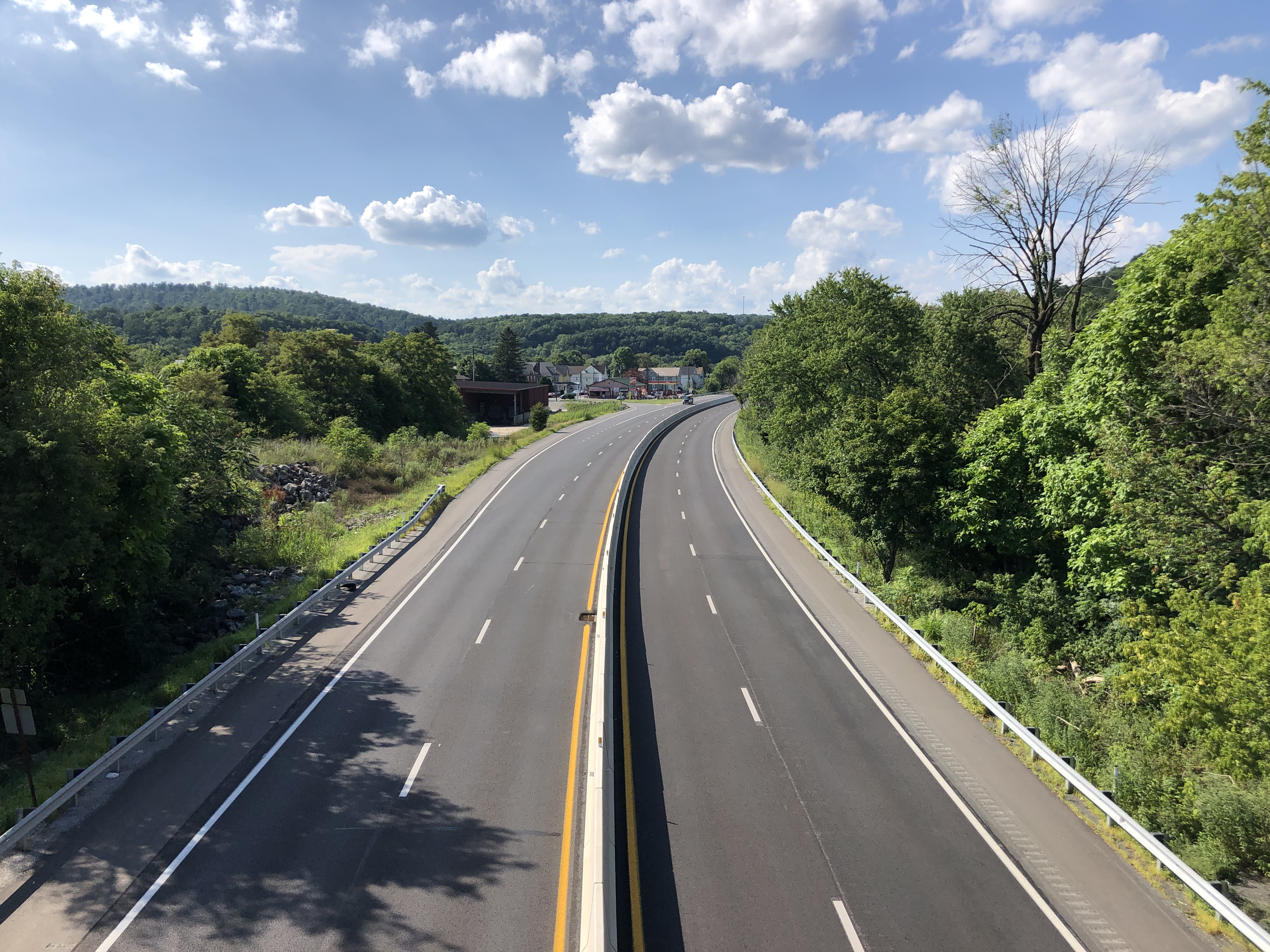
PA 248 westbound at PA 895 in Bowmanstown

When Pennsylvania legislated routes in 1911, the portion of road between Weissport and Lehigh Gap was designated as part of Legislative Route 163, which ran from Allentown to Mauch Chunk (present-day Jim Thorpe) while the portion of road between Bath and Easton was designated as part of Legislative Route 175, which continued west from Bath to Northampton and up the Lehigh River to Walnutport.

With the creation of the U.S. Highway System in 1926, the road between Weissport and Lehigh Gap was designated as part of US 309, a route that ran from Philadelphia north to Wilkes-Barre. In 1927, PA 45 was designated concurrent with US 309 on the road between Weissport and Lehigh Gap and onto the route of Legislative Route 175 between US 309 in Lehigh Gap and US 22 in Easton. A year later, PA 45 was shifted to a more direct alignment between Lehigh Gap and Bath. By 1930, a portion of PA 45 northwest of Bath was paved, with the section between Lehigh Gap and east of Walnutport under construction.

PA 45 followed Northampton Street into Easton, where it ended at US 22 at the intersection of 13th and Northampton streets. US 22 continued along Northampton Street east of this intersection while US 22 Byp. was designated to bypass downtown Easton to the north along Prospect Avenue, Pearl Street, and Bushkill Street. US 22 was realigned to replace US 22 Byp. along Prospect Avenue, Pearl Street, and Bushkill Street in the 1940s.

In the 1950s, US 309 was shifted to a new alignment farther west between Allentown and Hazleton, and PA 29 was shifted to use the road between Lehigh Gap and Weissport along with PA 45. In 1955, US 22 was moved to the Lehigh Valley Thruway, and PA 45 was extended east along Northampton Street through downtown Easton to the Northampton Street Bridge over the Delaware River while the former alignment of US 22 along Prospect Avenue, Pearl Street, and Bushkill Street became unnumbered. In 1961, PA 29/PA 45 was upgraded to a divided highway between Weissport and Lehigh Gap, with the portion south of Bowmanstown constructed as a freeway. The freeway between Palmerton and Bowmanstown was built on a new alignment to the west, the routes previously followed State Road, Mauch Chunk Road, and White Street between the two boroughs.

On May 9, 1966, PA 248 was designated to run from US 209 in Weissport east to US 611 (now PA 611) in Easton along its current alignment, replacing the PA 45 designation between Weissport and Easton along with PA 29 between Weissport and Lehigh Gap.

On November 24, 1998, an act of the Pennsylvania General Assembly designated the portion of PA 248 in Carbon County as the POW/MIA Remembrance Highway in honor of soldiers who are prisoner of war (POW) or missing in action (MIA).

== Major intersections ==
| County | Location | mi | km | Destinations | Notes |
|---|---|---|---|---|---|
| Carbon | Franklin Township | 0.000 | 0.000 | US 209 (Bridge Street / Interchange Road) to Penna Turnpike NE Extension (I-476) – Lehighton, Jim Thorpe, Stroudsburg | Western terminus |
| Carbon | Bowmanstown | 2.845 | 4.579 | Western end of freeway section | |
| Carbon | Bowmanstown | 2.845– 3.265 | 4.579– 5.255 | PA 895 west – Bowmanstown | Eastern terminus of PA 895 |
| Carbon | Palmerton–East Penn Township line | 5.617 | 9.040 | Palmerton | Access via Delaware Avenue |
| Northampton | Lehigh Township | 6.847 | 11.019 | Eastern end of freeway section | |
| Northampton | Lehigh Township | 6.847 | 11.019 | PA 873 south – Slatington | Northern terminus of PA 873 |
| Northampton | Lehigh Township | 7.013 | 11.286 | PA 145 south (Riverview Drive) – Walnutport, Allentown | Northern terminus of PA 145 |
| Northampton | Lehigh Township | 8.845 | 14.235 | PA 946 east (Mountain View Drive) – Danielsville | Western terminus of PA 946 |
| Northampton | Bath | 19.434 | 31.276 | PA 329 west / PA 987 south (Race Street) – Northampton, Allentown | Western end of PA 987 concurrency; eastern terminus of PA 329 |
| Northampton | Bath | 19.574 | 31.501 | PA 987 north (North Chestnut Street) – Chapman, Klecknersville | Eastern end of PA 987 concurrency |
| Northampton | Bath | 19.631 | 31.593 | PA 512 (Walnut Street) – Wind Gap, Bethlehem | |
| Northampton | Upper Nazareth Township | 22.275 | 35.848 | PA 946 (Daniels Road) – Moorestown, Newburg | |
| Northampton | Nazareth | 24.031 | 38.674 | PA 191 south (Nazareth Pike) – Bethlehem | Western end of PA 191 concurrency |
| Northampton | Nazareth | 24.194 | 38.936 | PA 191 north (Broad Street) – Stockertown, Bangor | Eastern end of PA 191 concurrency |
| Northampton | Lower Nazareth Township | 25.751 | 41.442 | PA 33 – Stroudsburg, Easton | Interchange |
| Northampton | Palmer Township | 28.666 | 46.133 | US 22 (Lehigh Valley Thruway) – Bethlehem, Easton | Interchange |
| Northampton | Easton | 31.106 | 50.060 | US 22 east (Lehigh Valley Thruway) to I-78 – New York | Interchange |
| Northampton | Easton | 31.285 | 50.348 | PA 611 (Larry Holmes Drive) – Stroudsburg, Philadelphia | Eastern terminus |
1.000 mi = 1.609 km; 1.000 km = 0.621 mi: Concurrency terminus
