= Pennsylvania Route 245 =

Former state highway in Pennsylvania, United States

Pennsylvania Route 245
- PA 245 highlighted in red

Route information
- Maintained by Pennsylvania Department of Highways
- Length: 2.10 mi (3.38 km)
- Existed: 1928–1940s

Major junctions
- West end: US 309 in Slatington
- PA 145 in Walnutport
- East end: PA 45 in Berlinsville

Location
- Country: United States
- State: Pennsylvania
- Counties: Northampton

Highway system
- Pennsylvania State Route System; Interstate; US; State; Scenic; Legislative
← PA 244	→ PA 246

Pennsylvania Route 245 (PA 245) was a 2.10-mile-long (3.38 km) east–west state highway located in the U.S. state of Pennsylvania. Commissioned in 1928, the designation began at U.S. Route 309 (US 309) in Slatington, east to PA 45 in Berlinsville. Today, the US 309 alignment has become PA 873 and the PA 45 designation has become PA 248. PA 245 was decommissioned in the 1940s.

== Route description ==
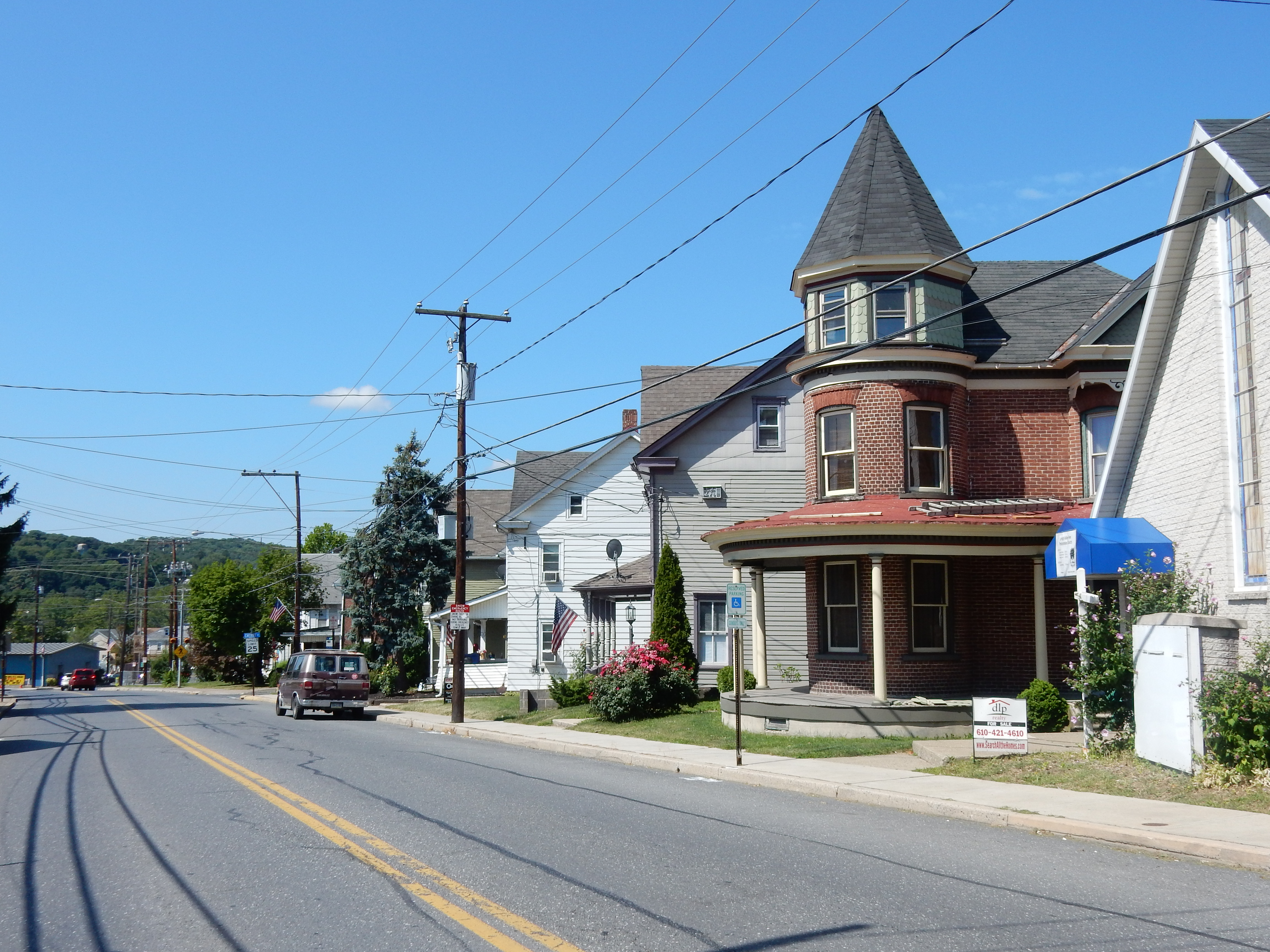
Main Street (SR 4022) in Walnutport

PA 245 began at an intersection with US 309 (now PA 873) in the borough of Slatington in Lehigh County. It headed eastward along Mountain View Drive (modern Main Street) and crossed the Lehigh River to enter the borough of Walnutport in Northampton County. Here, PA 245 intersected PA 145 at Washington Street/Cherry Street in the center of the borough. Outside of Walnutport, PA 245 traversed Lehigh Township on a northeasterly alignment. The highway terminated at an intersection with PA 45 (now PA 248) in Berlinsville.

== History ==
PA 245 was designated in 1928 to run from PA 145 in Walnutport east to PA 45 in Berlinsville along an unpaved road. By 1930, the route was extended west to US 309 in Slatington. At this time, PA 245 was paved from Slatington to just east of Walnutport. The remaining unpaved section was paved in the 1930s. The PA 245 designation was decommissioned in the 1940s. Today, the former route is SR 4016 along Main Street in Slatington, SR 4022 along Main Street in Walnutport, and township-maintained Main Street and Poplar Drive in Lehigh Township. A portion of Main Street in Lehigh Township has been severed with the construction of Mountain View Drive as the road connecting Walnutport to PA 248.

== Major intersections ==
County	Location	mi	km	Destinations	Notes
Lehigh	Slatington	0.00	0.00	US 309	Now PA 873
Northampton	Walnutport	0.74	1.19	PA 145 – Palmerton, Allentown	
Northampton	Lehigh Township	2.10	3.38	PA 45 – Lehighton, Easton	Now PA 248
1.000 mi = 1.609 km; 1.000 km = 0.621 mi
