= Pennsylvania Route 987 =

State highway in Pennsylvania, US

Pennsylvania Route 987

Route information
- Maintained by PennDOT
- Length: 10.351 mi (16.658 km)
- Existed: 1940–present

Major junctions
- South end: US 22 / Airport Road in Bethlehem
- PA 329 in Bath; PA 248 in Bath
- North end: PA 946 in Klecknersville

Location
- Country: United States
- State: Pennsylvania
- Counties: Lehigh, Northampton

Highway system
- Pennsylvania State Route System; Interstate; US; State; Scenic; Legislative
← PA 986	→ PA 989

Pennsylvania Route 987 (PA 987) is a state highway in the Lehigh Valley region of the U.S. state of Pennsylvania. It runs 10.3 mi (16.6 km) from U.S. Route 22 (US 22) near the Lehigh Valley International Airport north of Allentown north to PA 946 in Klecknersville.

The route begins at a cloverleaf interchange with the US 22 freeway north of Allentown in Lehigh County and heads to the east of the airport as a four-lane divided highway called Airport Road as it crosses into Northampton County. PA 987 narrows to a two-lane undivided road and continues north, becoming concurrent with PA 329 as it heads into Bath. Here, PA 329 ends and PA 987 briefly runs concurrent with PA 248 before leaving the borough. PA 987 continues northwest and serves Chapman before ending at PA 946. PA 987 was first designated in the 1930s between US 22 (Union Boulevard) in Allentown and PA 946 in Klecknersville. After US 22 was relocated to its present freeway alignment in 1955, the southern terminus of PA 987 was cut back to its interchange with US 22, which used to carry Interstate 78 (I-78) as well.

In the early 2000s, PA 987 was widened into a divided highway and shifted to a new alignment near Lehigh Valley International Airport.

== Route description ==
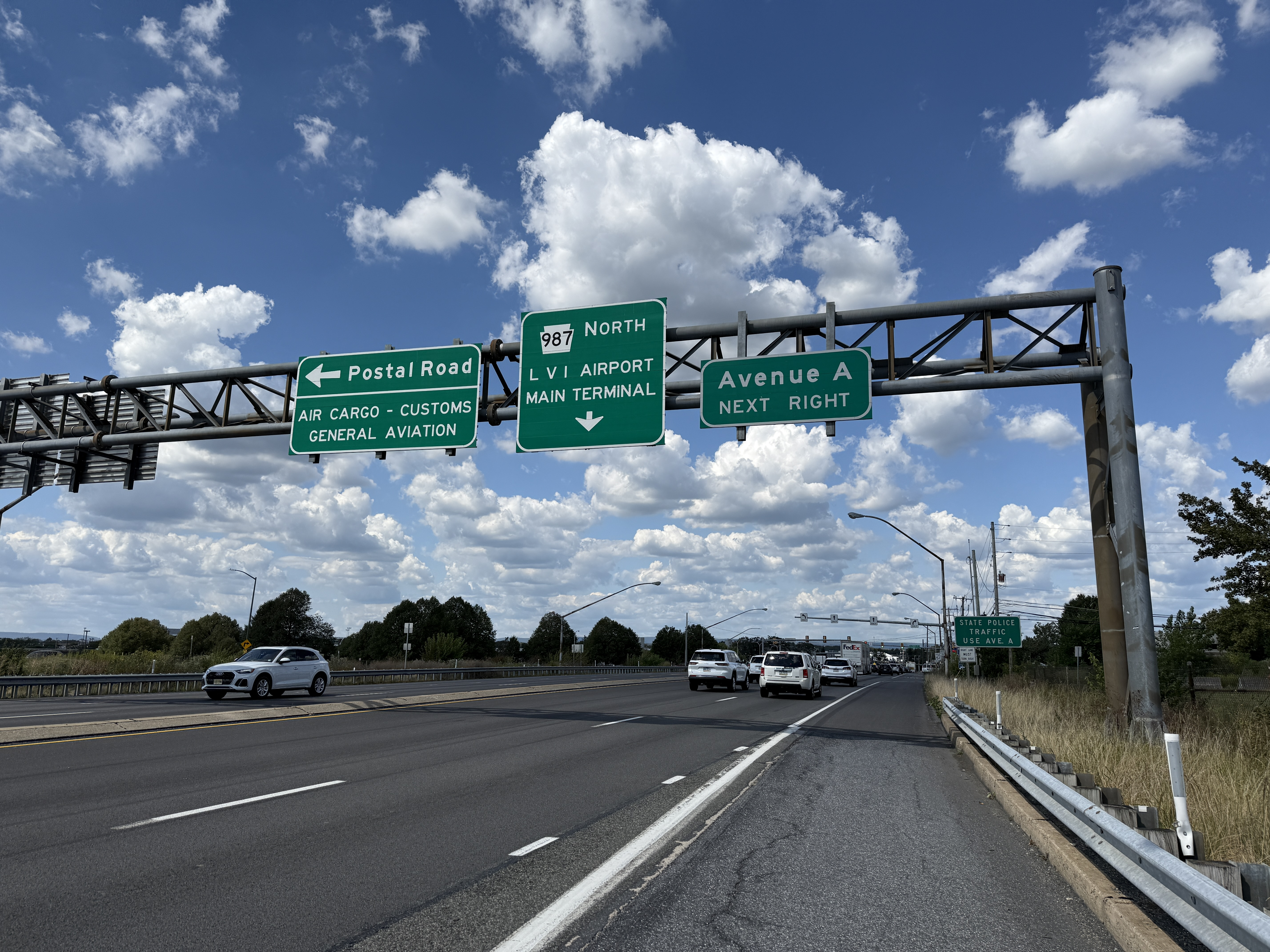
PA 987 northbound past the interchange with US 22 in Hanover Township

PA 987 begins at a cloverleaf interchange with the US 22 freeway in Hanover Township in Lehigh County, which is in the Lehigh Valley, heading northeast on four-lane divided Airport Road. South of here, Airport Road continues as State Route 1003, an unsigned quadrant route, into the city of Allentown, where it ends at Union Boulevard.

From the US 22 interchange, the route heads northeast along the border between Hanover Township to the west and the city of Bethlehem to the east, passing between the Lehigh Valley International Airport to the west and an industrial park to the east. The road fully enters Hanover Township and becomes five lanes with a center left-turn lane, continuing between the airport to the west and commercial development to the east, again becoming a divided highway near the community of Schoenersville. Upon crossing Schoenersville Road, PA 987 enters Hanover Township in Northampton County and curves north near farmland, narrowing to a two-lane undivided road.

The route continues north through a mix of agricultural areas and scattered residential subdivisions as it continues into East Allen Township. Further north, PA 987 crosses the Nor-Bath Trail before it reaches an intersection with PA 329 in the community of Franks Corner.

At this point, PA 987 turns east for a concurrency with PA 329 on Nor-Bath Boulevard, with the two routes continuing east through Jacksonville before turning northeast and passing to the east of a quarry, with the Nor-Bath Trail parallel to the east of the road. The road passes near a cement plant before it heads into the borough of Bath. Here, the road becomes Race Street and passes through woods before heading into residential areas. PA 329 reaches its eastern terminus at the PA 248 intersection, where PA 987 makes a turn east to follow PA 248 for a block on West Main Street, crossing the Monocacy Creek. A block west of PA 512, the two routes turn north onto South Chestnut Street, passing homes. At the Northampton Street intersection, PA 248 splits to the east and PA 987 continues north on North Chestnut Street. The route curves northwest through a mix of farm fields and homes as it leaves Bath. The road turns north and briefly passes through East Allen Township again before it enters Moore Township, becoming Monocacy Drive. PA 987 passes through wooded areas with some homes, crossing the Monocacy Creek again, before it curves northwest and passes through a section of the borough of Chapman, bypassing the center of the borough to the southwest. The route continues through a mix of farmland and homes before it reaches its northern terminus at PA 946 at the Cross Roads junction near the community of Klecknersville. Past this intersection, the road continues northwest as part of PA 946.

== History ==
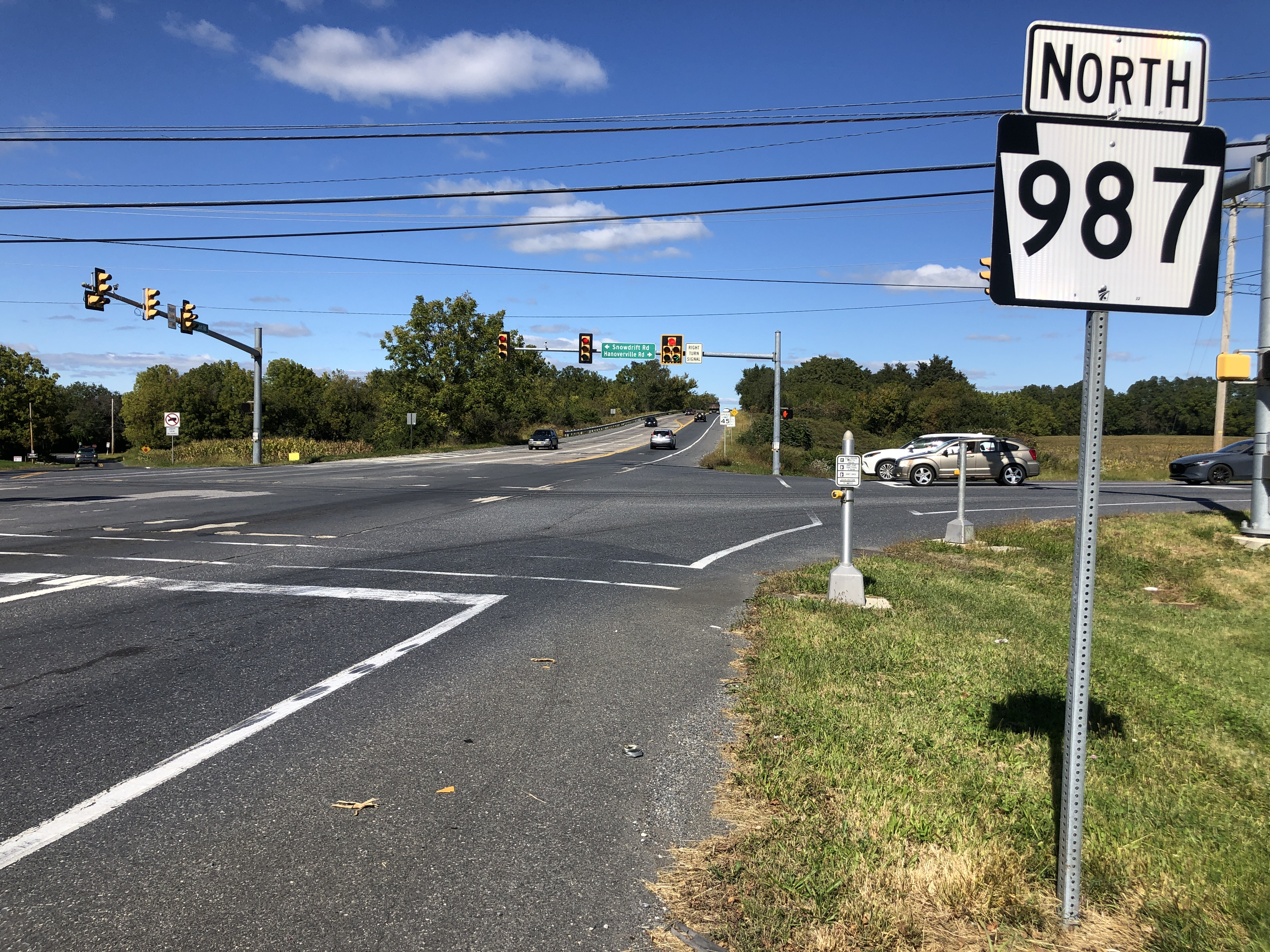
PA 987 northbound in East Allen Township

When Pennsylvania first legislated routes in 1911, the portion of PA 987 along the PA 329 concurrency was designated as part of Legislative Route 175. By 1928, the portion of road between Schoenersville and Bath was paved, with the portion between Franks Corner and Bath designated as part of PA 145. The road between Allentown and Schoenersville was paved by 1930. PA 987 was designated in the 1930s to run from US 22 (Union Boulevard) in Allentown north to PA 946 in Klecknersville, following Schoenersville Road (now Airport Road) out of Allentown before picking up its current alignment. The concurrent PA 145 designation between Franks Corner and Bath was replaced by PA 329 in 1941.

Following completion of the US 22 freeway in 1955, the southern terminus of PA 987 was cut back to the interchange with US 22, which also carried I-78 at the time.

In the 1980s, PA 987 north of Allentown was renamed from Allentown-Schoenersville Road to Airport Road. In 2000, a two-year project costing $16.8 million began to widen PA 987 to a divided highway between US 22 and Schoenersville Road.

In addition, a portion of the road was shifted east at the Schoenersville Road intersection and the relocated Race Street intersection was reconfigured from a Y-intersection to a T-intersection.

== Major intersections ==
County	Location	mi	km	Destinations	Notes
Lehigh	Hanover Township–Bethlehem line	0.000	0.000	Airport Road	Continuation south
Lehigh	Hanover Township–Bethlehem line	0.000	0.000	US 22 (Lehigh Valley Thruway) – Bethlehem, Harrisburg	Cloverleaf interchange
Northampton	East Allen Township	4.498	7.239	PA 329 west (Nor-Bath Boulevard) – Northampton	South end of PA 329 overlap
Northampton	Bath	6.619	10.652	PA 248 west (West Main Street) – Lehighton PA 329 ends	South end of PA 248 overlap; eastern terminus of PA 329
Northampton	Bath	6.758	10.876	PA 248 east (West Northampton Street) to PA 512 – Easton	North end of PA 248 overlap
Northampton	Moore Township	10.351	16.658	PA 946 (Community Drive / Mountain View Drive) – Moorestown, Berlinsville, Emanuelsville	Northern terminus
1.000 mi = 1.609 km; 1.000 km = 0.621 mi: Concurrency terminus
