= Danielsville =

Danielsville is the name of two places in the United States:

- Danielsville, Georgia, a city in Madison County
- Danielsville, Pennsylvania, a village in Northampton County
