= Pennsylvania Route 512 =

State highway in Pennsylvania, US

Pennsylvania Route 512

Route information
- Maintained by PennDOT
- Length: 26.105 mi (42.012 km)

Major junctions
- South end: US 22 in Hanover Township
- PA 248 in Bath; PA 946 in Moore Township; PA 33 near Wind Gap; PA 191 in Bangor
- North end: PA 611 in Upper Mount Bethel Township

Location
- Country: United States
- State: Pennsylvania
- Counties: Northampton

Highway system
- Pennsylvania State Route System; Interstate; US; State; Scenic; Legislative
← PA 507	→ PA 513
← US 202	PA 202	→ PA 203
← PA 701	PA 702	→ PA 706

Pennsylvania Route 512 (PA 512) is a 26.1-mile-long (42.0 km) state route in Northampton County in the Lehigh Valley region in eastern Pennsylvania. The southern terminus is at U.S. Route 22 (US 22) north of Bethlehem in Hanover Township. The northern terminus is at PA 611 in Upper Mount Bethel Township. The route heads north from US 22 to Bath, where it intersects PA 248. From here, PA 512 continues northeast and intersects PA 946 in Moorestown before it reaches an interchange with the PA 33 freeway in Wind Gap. The route heads east through the northern Northampton County boroughs of Wind Gap, Pen Argyl, Bangor, and East Bangor, intersecting PA 191 in Bangor. It then continues east to PA 611.

PA 512 was originally designated by 1928 to run from PA 12 (now PA 191) in Hecktown north to PA 12 in Wind Gap. In the 1930s, the southern terminus was realigned to US 22/PA 12 at Center Street and Elizabeth Avenue in Bethlehem, with PA 946 replacing the route between Hecktown and Moorestown. The road between Wind Gap and Bangor was originally designated PA 202 in 1928 before being renumbered to PA 702 in 1935 to avoid conflict with US 202.

The section of road between Bangor and Mount Bethel was originally designated part of US 611 in 1926 before becoming part of PA 712 in the 1930s following the relocation of US 611 to the east. The PA 702 and PA 712 designations were both removed in the 1940s. In 1976, PA 512 was extended north to its current terminus along the former alignments of PA 702 and PA 712. Also, the southern terminus was cut back to its current location.

== Route description ==
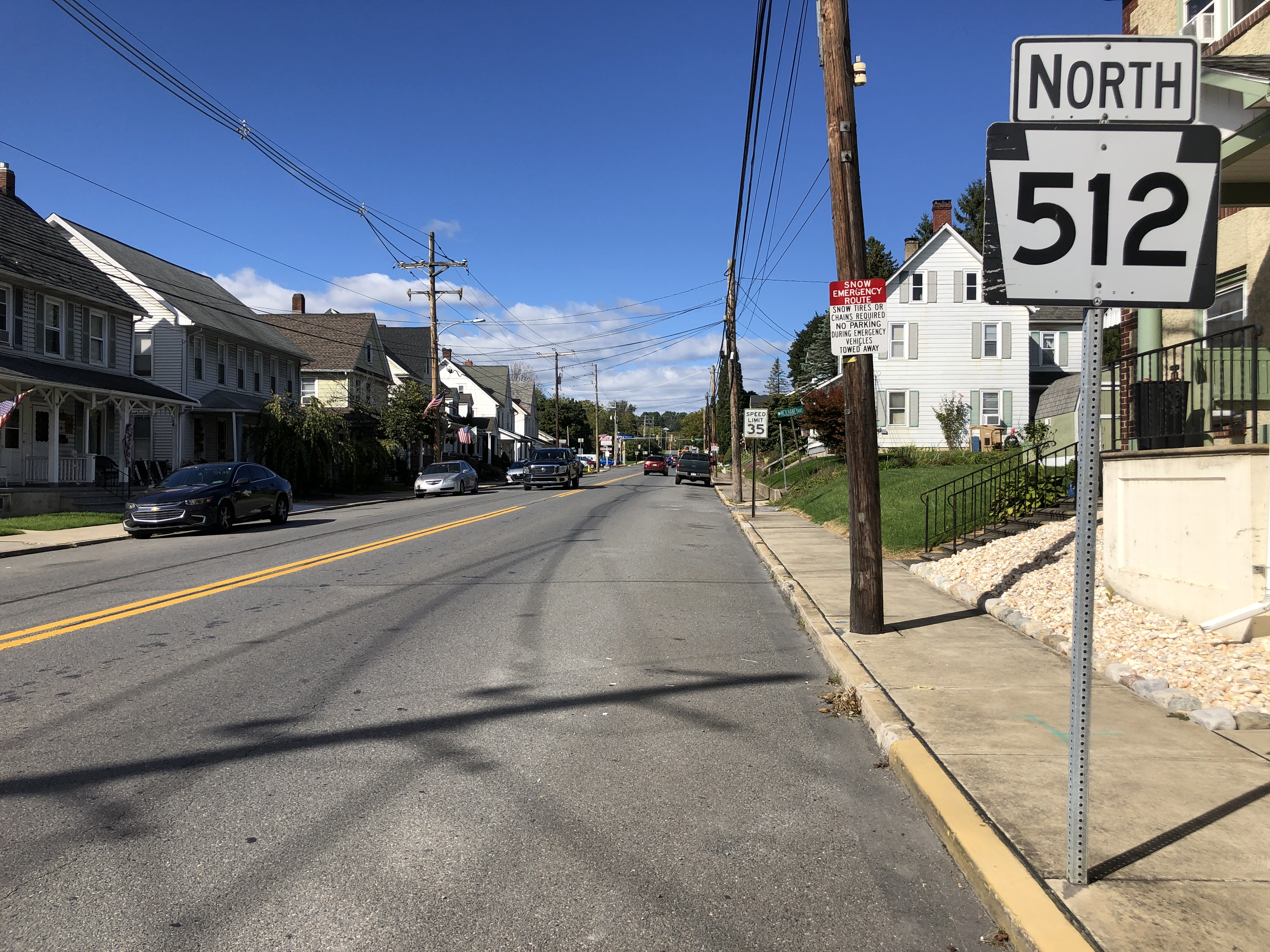
PA 512 northbound past PA 248 in Bath

PA 512 begins at an interchange with the US 22 freeway in Hanover Township in Northampton County, which is in the Lehigh Valley, heading north on four-lane divided Bath Pike. South of this interchange, Bath Pike continues as State Route 3011, an unsigned quadrant route, towards Bethlehem, where it becomes Center Street.

From the US 22 interchange, the route runs north through commercial areas with some residential development, becoming an undivided road. The road heads into East Allen Township and narrows to two lanes, continuing through agricultural areas with some homes as Beth-Bath Pike. PA 512 crosses the Monocacy Creek and Norfolk Southern's Cement Secondary, passing through Clyde. Farther north, the route runs through commercial areas to the east of a cement plant before it enters the borough of Bath upon crossing the Norfolk Southern railroad tracks again.

The road then becomes South Walnut Street and passes businesses before it becomes lined with homes. PA 512 intersects Main Street in Bath and becomes North Walnut Street, soon reaching a junction with PA 248, which provides access to PA 329 and PA 987 to the west. The route continues through residential areas with some businesses in the northern part of the borough as a three-lane road with two northbound lanes and one southbound lane.

PA 512 leaves Bath and becomes Moorestown Drive, briefly passing through East Allen Township before it continues into Moore Township. The road narrows to two lanes and runs through a mix of farms, woods, and residences, passing to the east of a golf course and serving Chapman Quarries. The route curves northeast and continues through rural areas with some residential subdivisions before it reaches an intersection with PA 946 in Moorestown. PA 512 continues through rural areas with homes and crosses into Bushkill Township, where the name changes to Moorestown Road. The road continues northeast through a mix of farmland and woodland with a few homes, crossing Bushkill Creek and passing through Clearfield. Farther northeast, the route enters Plainfield Township and passes through commercial areas before it reaches an interchange with the PA 33 freeway, where the route is briefly a four-lane divided highway.

Past this interchange, PA 512 narrows to two lanes and intersects Sullivan Trail, at which point it turns north and enters the borough of Wind Gap. The route becomes South Broadway, a three-lane road with a center left-turn lane that passes businesses. Farther north, the road narrows to two lanes and passes homes along with a few businesses, becoming North Broadway at the Center Street intersection. A block later, PA 512 turns east onto Park Avenue for a block before it heads northeast along North Lehigh Avenue, passing residences.

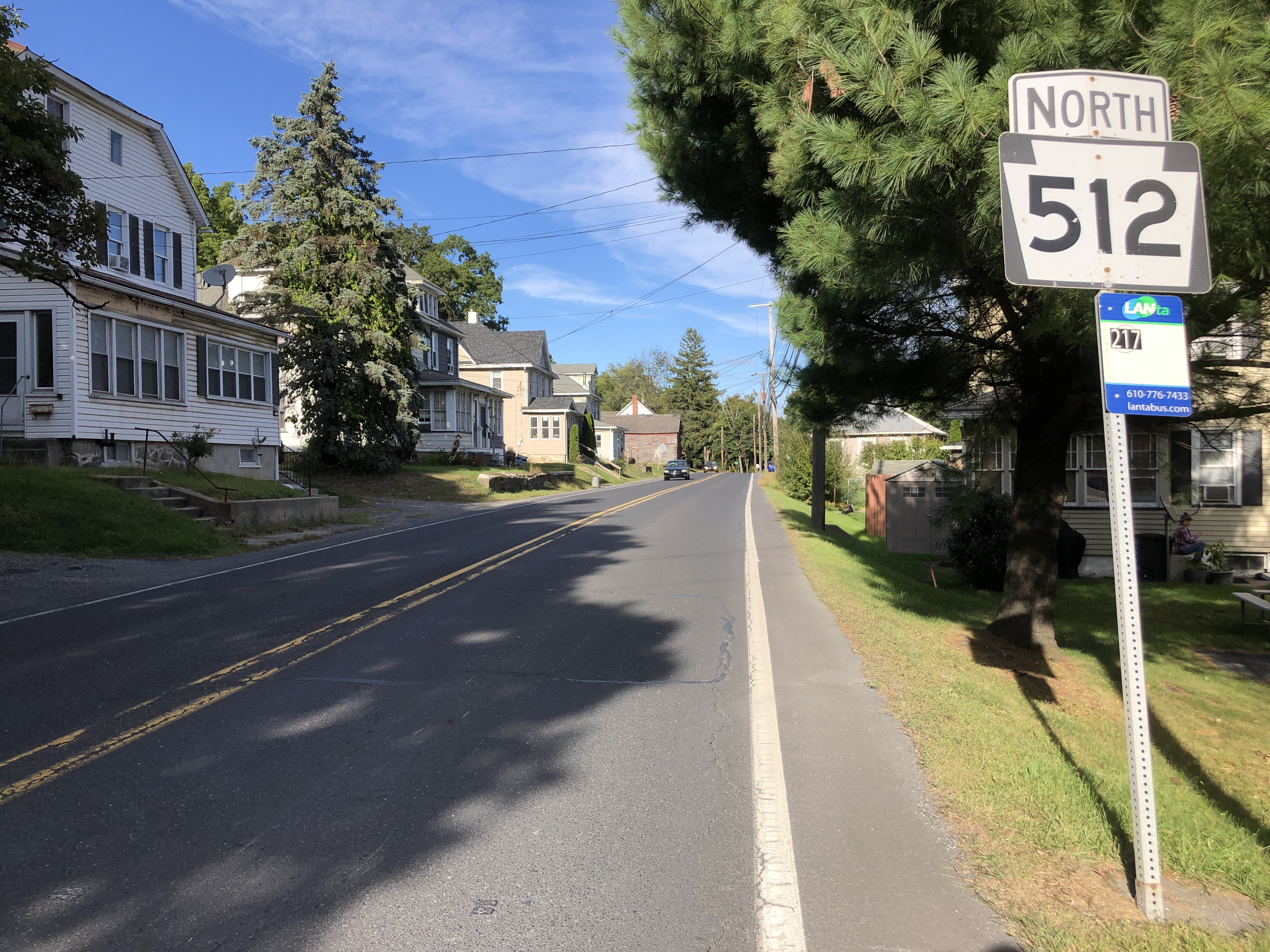
PA 512 northbound in Plainfield Township

The route heads out of Wind Gap and crosses back into Plainfield Township, where it becomes Pennsylvania Avenue and heads through forested areas with some residential, commercial, and industrial development. The road enters the borough of Pen Argyl as West Pennsylvania Avenue and is lined with homes along with a few businesses, becoming East Pennsylvania Avenue at the Robinson Avenue intersection. PA 512 turns north onto East Main Street and curves northeast past a mix of homes and businesses. The route heads east onto Blue Valley Drive and leaves Pen Argyl for Plainfield Township, where it heads northeast through West Bangor. The road enters Washington Township and runs southeast through commercial areas. PA 512 continues east and heads into the borough of Bangor, where it becomes Market Street and is lined with homes.

In downtown Bangor, the route crosses PA 191 and Martins Creek before it turns south on Main Street for a block and then northeast along Erdman Street, crossing Norfolk Southern's Portland Secondary. PA 512 heads northeast along Bill Scott Boulevard through forested areas with some developments, running along the east side of the railroad tracks. The road enters the borough of East Bangor and heads east into residential areas as West Central Avenue. The route crosses Broad Street and becomes East Central Avenue, passing more homes. PA 512 turns northeast and enters Upper Mount Bethel Township, where it becomes Mt. Bethel Highway and runs through wooded areas with some farm fields and development. The route heads east and reaches its northern terminus at an intersection with PA 611.

== History ==
Pennsylvania Route 202
- Location: Wind Gap – Bangor
- Existed: 1928–1935

Pennsylvania Route 702
- Location: Wind Gap – Bangor
- Existed: April 1935–1940s

When routes were first legislated in Pennsylvania in 1911, what is now PA 512 was legislated as part of Legislative Route 165 between Wind Gap and Bangor and Legislative Route 166 between Bangor and Upper Mount Bethel Township. When the U.S. Highway System was established in 1926, the section of paved road between Bangor and Mount Bethel was designated as part of US 611, which ran concurrent with PA 2.

The road between Wind Gap and Bangor was also a paved road. By 1928, the roadway between Bethlehem and Bath existed as a paved road. PA 512 was first designated in 1928 to run from PA 12 (now PA 191) in Hecktown north to PA 12 (Sullivan Trail) in Wind Gap, heading north to Moorestown before continuing northeast along its current alignment to Wind Gap. PA 512 was then unpaved with the portion of road between PA 12 and PA 45 (now PA 248) under construction.

In 1928, PA 202 was designated to run from PA 12 (Broadway) in Wind Gap east to US 611 (Main Street) in Bangor along a paved road. Also, the concurrent PA 2 designation was removed from US 611 by this time.

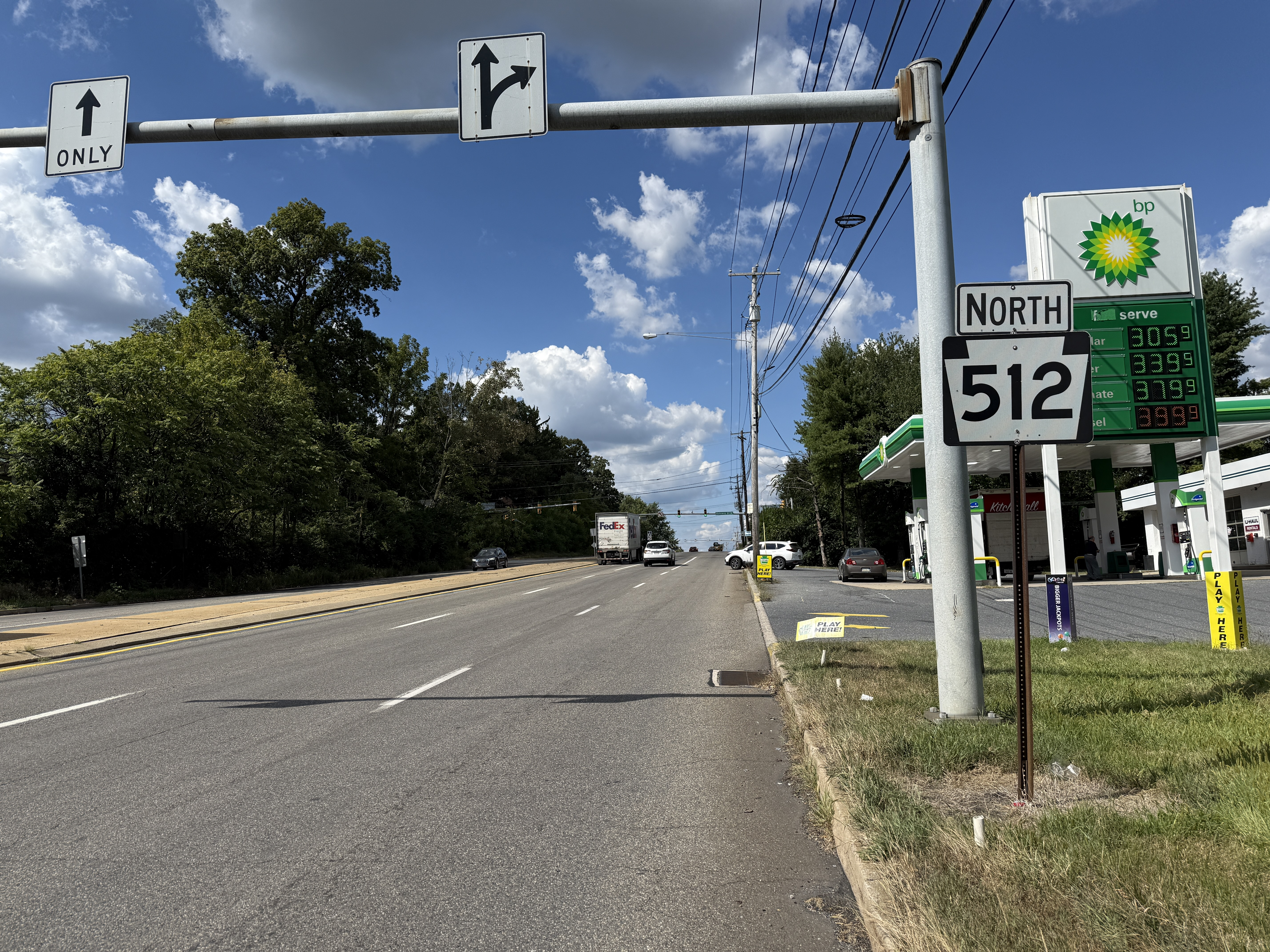
PA 512 northbound past US 22 in Hanover Township

In the 1930s, PA 512 was realigned at Moorestown to head south to US 22/PA 12 (Elizabeth Avenue) in Bethlehem, following its current alignment south and entering Bethlehem on Center Street. A portion of PA 946 was designated on the former alignment of PA 512 between Hecktown and Moorestown, which by then had been entirely paved.

PA 202 was renumbered to PA 702 in April 1935 in order to avoid duplication with US 202, which was designated in Pennsylvania in 1934. Also, the portion of road between Bangor and Mount Bethel became the northern segment of PA 712 following the rerouting of US 611 to a different alignment to the east.

The PA 702 and PA 712 designations were decommissioned in the 1940s.

In 1976, the northern terminus of PA 512 was extended from Wind Gap east to PA 611, following the former sections of PA 702 and PA 712. Also, the southern terminus was cut back to its current location at the interchange with the US 22 freeway.

== Major intersections ==
The entire route is in Northampton County.

Location	mi	km	Destinations	Notes
Hanover Township	0.000	0.000	US 22 (Lehigh Valley Thruway) – Allentown, Easton	Interchange; southern terminus
Bath	4.556	7.332	PA 248 (East Northampton Street) to PA 987 – Lehighton, Easton	
Moore Township	8.531	13.729	PA 946 (Community Drive/Daniels Road) – Klecknersville, Nazareth	
Plainfield Township	14.040	22.595	PA 33 – Easton, Bethlehem, Stroudsburg	Interchange
Bangor	20.489	32.974	PA 191 (1st Street) – Stroudsburg, Nazareth	
Upper Mount Bethel Township	26.105	42.012	PA 611 (North Delaware Drive) – Portland, Stroudsburg, Easton	Northern terminus
1.000 mi = 1.609 km; 1.000 km = 0.621 mi

== PA 512 Truck ==
Pennsylvania Route 512 Truck
- Location: Bath, Pennsylvania
- Length: 6.0 mi (9.7 km)
- Existed: 2013–2016

Pennsylvania Route 512 Truck was a truck route around a weight-restricted bridge over the Bushkill Creek on which trucks over 35 tons and combination loads over 40 tons were prohibited. The route followed PA 946, Cherry Hill Road, Noff Road, and Bushkill Center Road. It was signed in 2013, but it was removed in 2016 following a bridge repair.
