= Pennsylvania Route 945 =

Former state highway in Pennsylvania, United States

Pennsylvania Route 945
- PA 945 highlighted on a modern map

Route information
- Maintained by Pennsylvania Department of Highways
- Length: 6 mi (9.7 km)
- Existed: 1928–1946

Major junctions
- South end: PA 402 in Smithfield Township
- PA 612 in Smithfield Township
- North end: US 209 in Middle Smithfield Township

Location
- Country: United States
- State: Pennsylvania
- Counties: Monroe

Highway system
- Pennsylvania State Route System; Interstate; US; State; Scenic; Legislative
← PA 944	→ PA 946

Pennsylvania Route 945 was a short connector in Smithfield Township and Middle Smithfield Township, Monroe County, Pennsylvania. Route 945 started at Pennsylvania Route 402 in Smithfield Township and ended at U.S. Route 209 in Middle Smithfield Township. The 6-mile (9.7 km) route consisted entirely in Monroe County. The road was assigned in 1928, paved in 1932, and removed in 1946. The route is now Monroe County Quadrant Route 2023.

== Route description ==
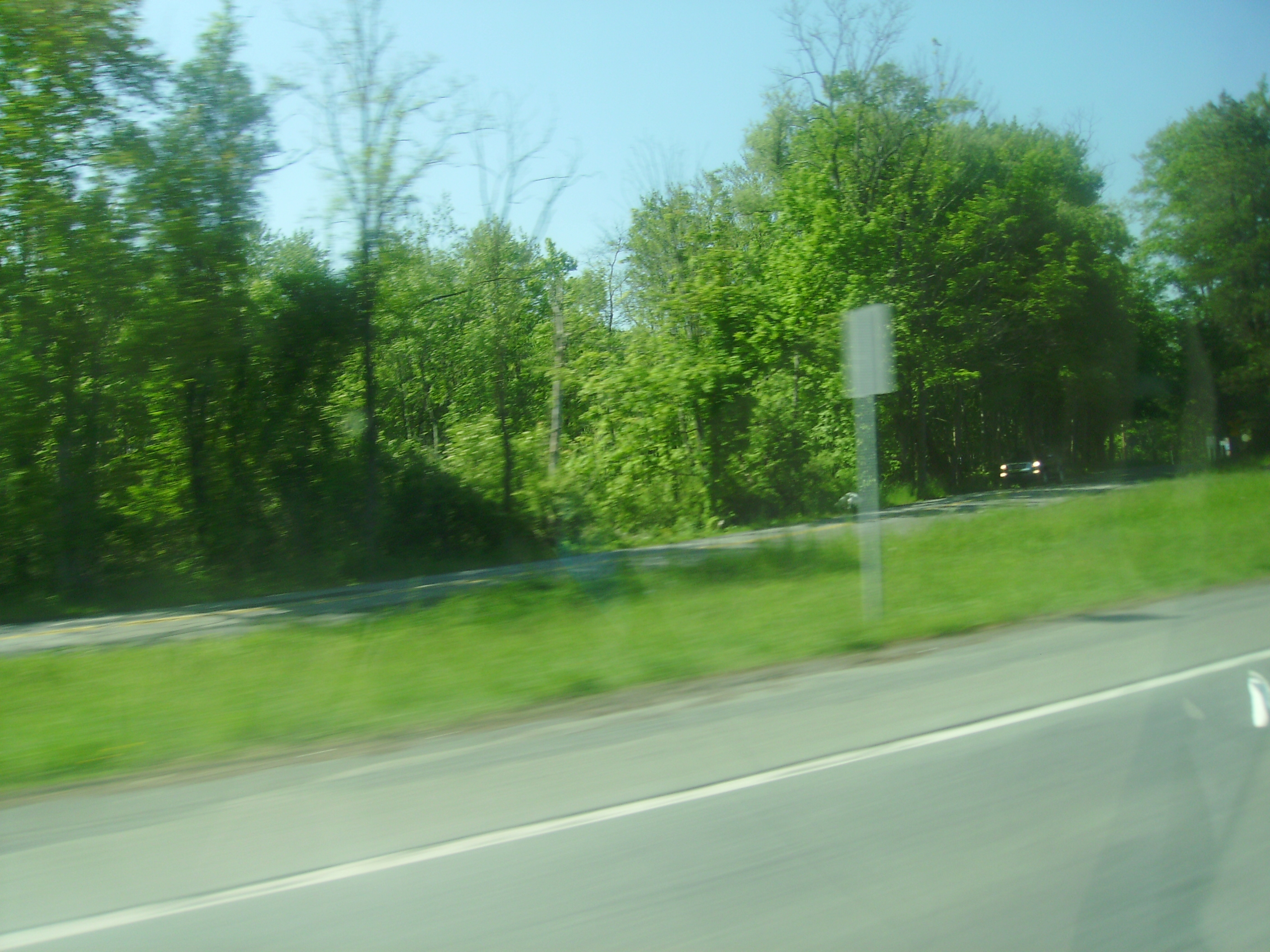
The former PA 945 in May 2008

Route 945 began at an intersection with Pennsylvania Route 402 in Minisink Hills. The route headed eastward, intersecting with Pennsylvania Route 612 at Shawnee-on-Delaware. The two routes were concurrent and headed to the northeast, paralleling the Delaware River. Route 945 soon turned off to the north, heading into Middle Smithfield Township. Route 945 passed to the east of Shawnee Lake, crossed through mountains and intersected with local roads. Route 945 terminated at U.S. Route 209 soon after.

== History ==
Route 945 was assigned, like most routes in Pennsylvania in 1928. The entire 6 miles (9.7 km) of the highway was paved in 1931 and remained intact for the next 15 years, when it was decommissioned in 1946. What was once Route 945 is now Hollow Road and River Road (Monroe County Quadrant Route 2023).

Although Route 945 was decommissioned in favor for a couple quadrant routes, the highway has grown into a connector road for the several lakes it passed, along with the Delaware River. The southern terminus of the highway, Route 402 was truncated to the village of Marshalls Creek and is currently a local road. The northern terminus (US 209 in Coolbaughs) however, remains in place to this date.

== Major intersections ==
The entire route was in Monroe County.

Location	mi	km	Destinations	Notes
Smithfield Township	0	0.0	PA 402	
Smithfield Township			PA 612	Begin/end concurrency
Smithfield Township			PA 612	Begin/end concurrency
Middle Smithfield Township	6	9.7	US 209	
1.000 mi = 1.609 km; 1.000 km = 0.621 mi
