= Pennsylvania Route 946 =

State highway in Northampton County, Pennsylvania, US

Pennsylvania Route 946

Route information
- Maintained by PennDOT
- Length: 18.226 mi (29.332 km)
- Existed: 1928–present

Major junctions
- West end: PA 248 in Berlinsville
- PA 987 in Moore Township; PA 512 in Moore Township; PA 248 in Upper Nazareth Township
- East end: PA 191 in Newburg

Location
- Country: United States
- State: Pennsylvania
- Counties: Northampton

Highway system
- Pennsylvania State Route System; Interstate; US; State; Scenic; Legislative
| ← PA 945 | → PA 948 |

Pennsylvania Route 946 (PA 946) is a rural Pennsylvania state highway that runs approximately 18.2 miles (29.3 km) from PA 248 in Berlinsville east to PA 191 in Newburg in Northampton County in the Lehigh Valley region of the state.

The route heads east from PA 248 a short distance to the south of Blue Mountain, passing through Danielsville and intersecting the northern terminus of PA 987 in Klecknersville. After intersecting PA 512 in Moorestown, PA 946 turns southeast and intersects PA 248 again before reaching its terminus at PA 191. PA 946 was first designated in 1928 onto an unpaved road running from a point between Danielsville and Youngsville and PA 512 in Moorestown while part of PA 512 ran along the alignment east of Moorestown.

In the 1930s, PA 946 was extended to its current alignment, replacing that section of PA 512, and was paved.

== Route description ==
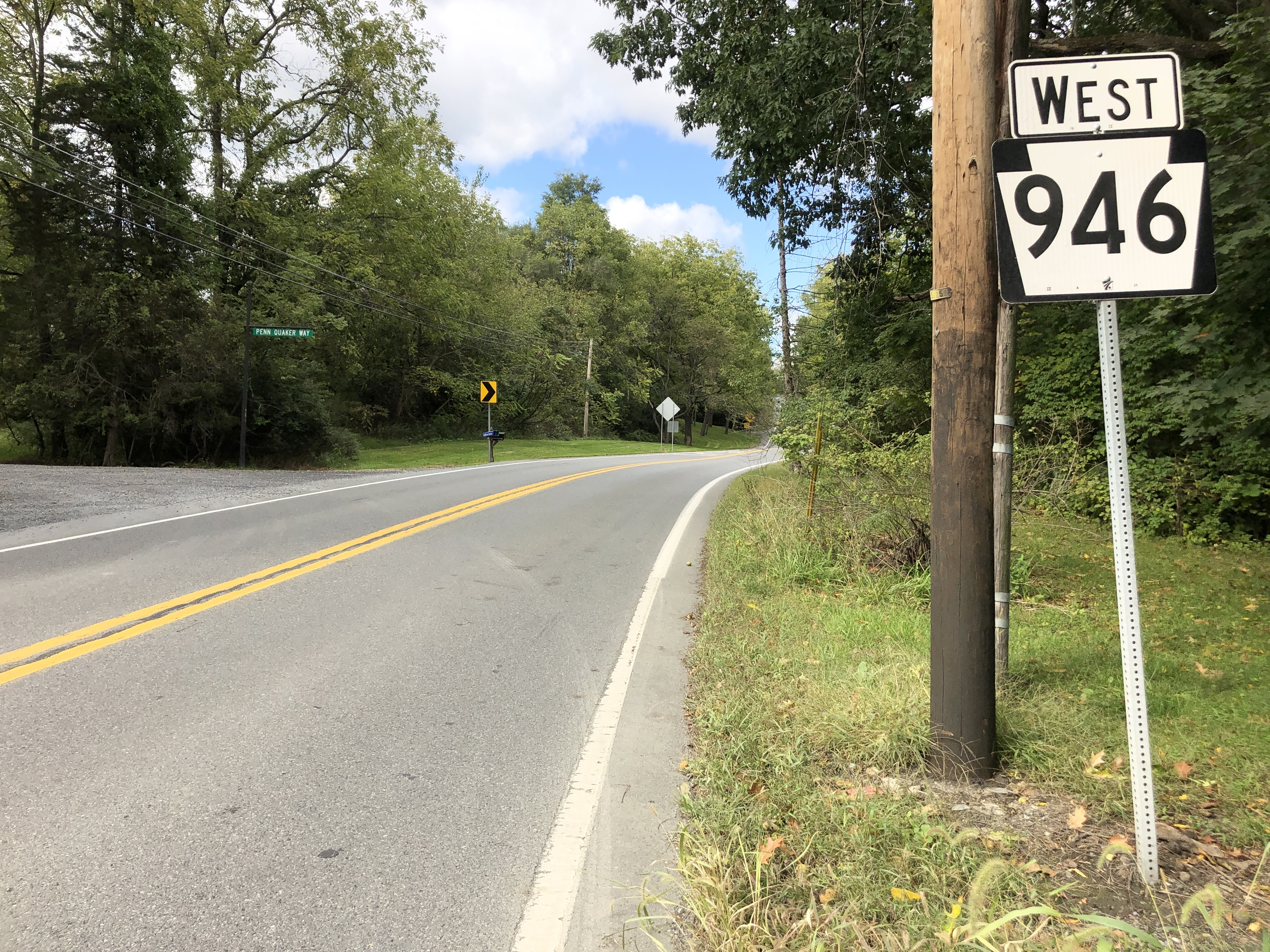
PA 946 westbound in Bushkill Township

PA 946 begins at an intersection with PA 248 in Berlinsville in Lehigh Township in Northampton County, which is in the Lehigh Valley, heading northeast on two-lane undivided Mountain View Drive. West of PA 248, Mountain View Drive continues towards the borough of Walnutport. From the western terminus, the route passes through a mix of farms, woods, and residences. The road curves east and reaches Danielsville, where it intersects Blue Mountain Drive a short distance south of Blue Mountain. PA 946 then heads southeast through a mix of rural areas and residences, curving east and passing through Rockville. The route crosses into Moore Township and runs through a mix of farmland and woodland, passing through Youngsville and crossing the Hokendauqua Creek.

The road curves southeast into residential areas, passing through Klecknersville before coming to the northern terminus of PA 987 in Cross Roads. At this point, PA 987 continues southeast and PA 946 turns northeast onto Community Drive, passing more homes before curving east into a mix of farm fields and woods with a few residences. The route curves southeast and reaches Moorestown, where it crosses PA 512.

Past this intersection, the road becomes Nazareth Drive and curves south, passing residential neighborhoods. PA 946 heads southeast into a mix of farms, woods, and homes, where it crosses into Bushkill Township and becomes Daniels Road. The route soon enters Upper Nazareth Township and runs south through a mix of farm fields and residential subdivisions before it intersects PA 248 in Christian Springs. After this intersection, the road passes through a mix of farms and trees to the west of a quarry and crosses Norfolk Southern's Cement Secondary. The route runs through more rural areas and passes through Georgetown before it crosses into Lower Nazareth Township. PA 946 then passes through a mix of agricultural areas and residential subdivisions before it reaches its eastern terminus at an intersection with PA 191 in Newburg.

== History ==
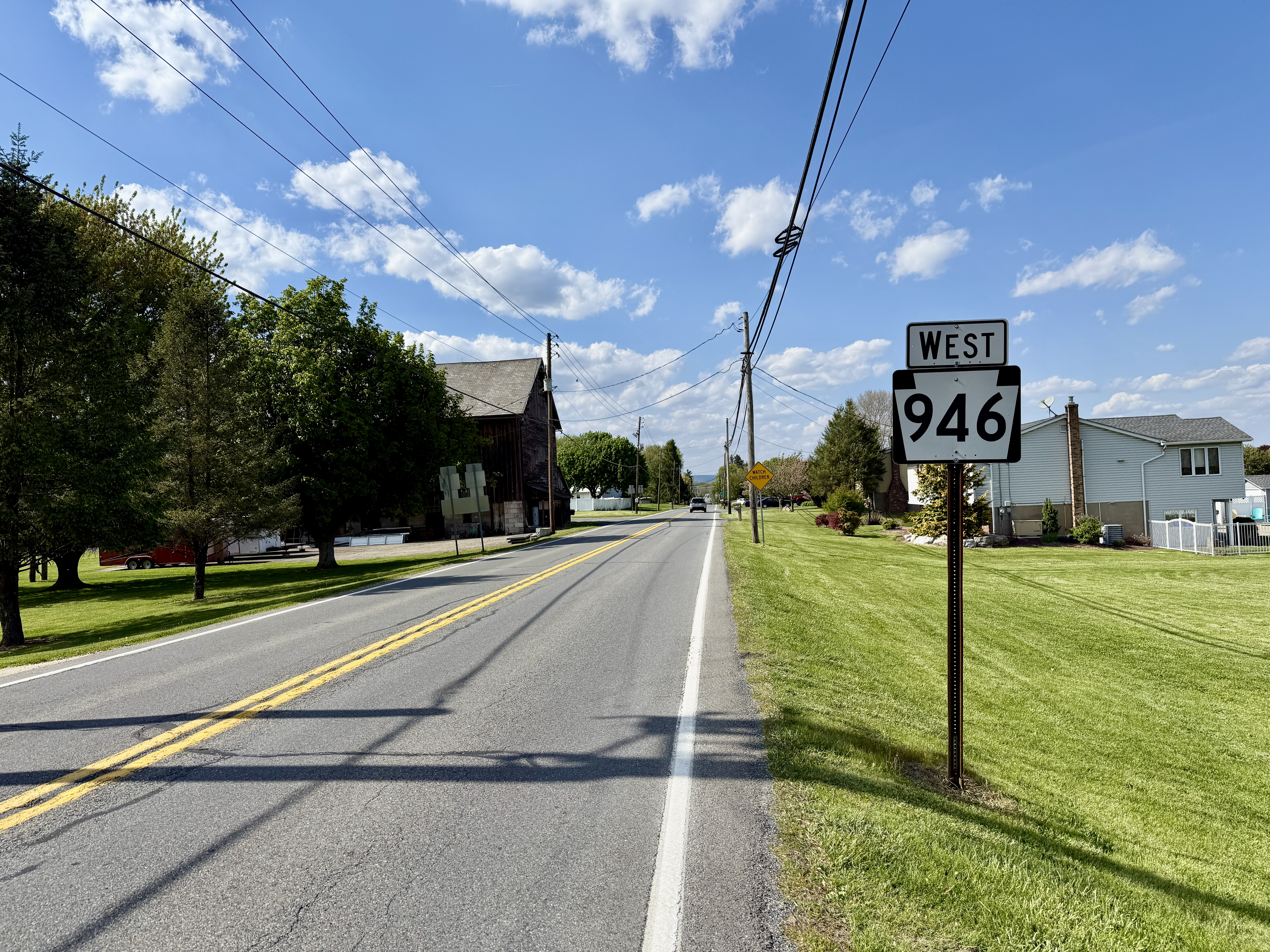
PA 946 westbound past PA 191 in Lower Nazareth Township

The present-day routing of PA 946 was not legislated as a route when Pennsylvania first legislated routes in 1911. In 1928, PA 946 was designated along an unpaved road running from a point between Danielsville and Youngsville, where a paved local road continued west towards Walnutport, east to PA 512 in Moorestown.

The portion of road between Moorestown and PA 12 (now PA 191) in Hecktown was designated as the southern portion of PA 512, which was unpaved and was under construction between PA 12 and PA 45, which is now PA 248.

In the 1930s, PA 946 was extended to its current alignment between PA 45, which is now PA 248, near Walnutport, and PA 12, which is now PA 191 in Hecktown. By then, the entire road was paved. The route replaced PA 512, which was rerouted to head south to Bethlehem, between Moorestown and Hecktown. PA 946 has remained on the same alignment since.

== Major intersections ==
The entire route is in Northampton County.

| Location | mi | km | Destinations | Notes |
|---|---|---|---|---|
| Lehigh Township | 0.000 | 0.000 | PA 248 (Lehigh Drive) – Lehighton, Easton | Western terminus |
| Moore Township | 9.480 | 15.257 | PA 987 south (Monocacy Drive) – Bath | Northern terminus of PA 987 |
| Moore Township | 12.540 | 20.181 | PA 512 (Moorestown Road) – Bath, Wind Gap | |
| Upper Nazareth Township | 15.992 | 25.737 | PA 248 (Bath Pike) – Bath, Lehighton, Easton | |
| Lower Nazareth Township | 18.226 | 29.332 | PA 191 (Bethlehem-Nazareth Pike) – Nazareth, Bethlehem | Eastern terminus |
1.000 mi = 1.609 km; 1.000 km = 0.621 mi
