= Lehigh Township, Northampton County, Pennsylvania =

Township in Pennsylvania, US

Lehigh Township
- Township
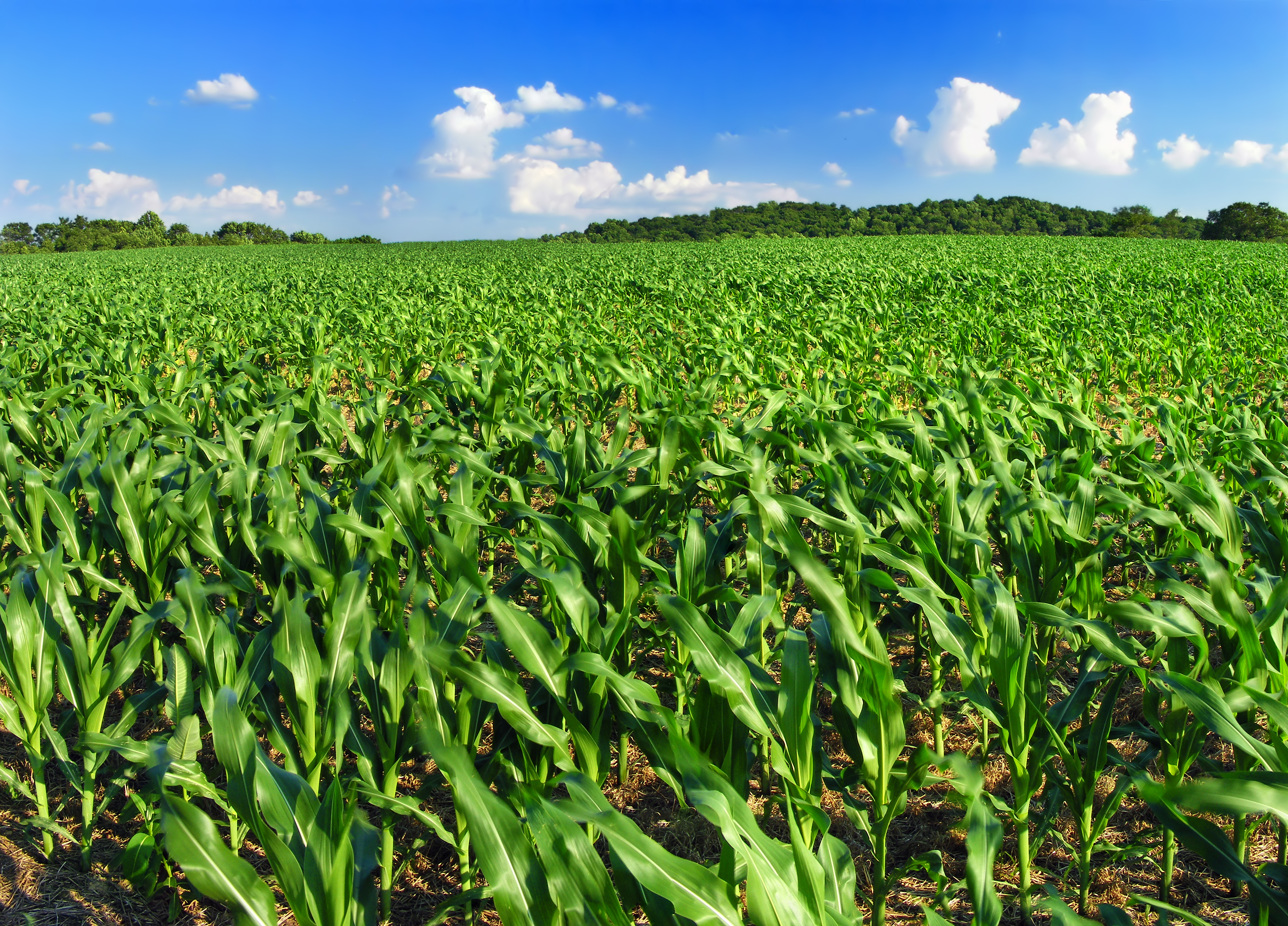
- A Lehigh Township cornfield in June 2010

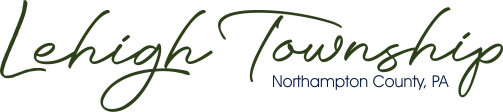
- Seal

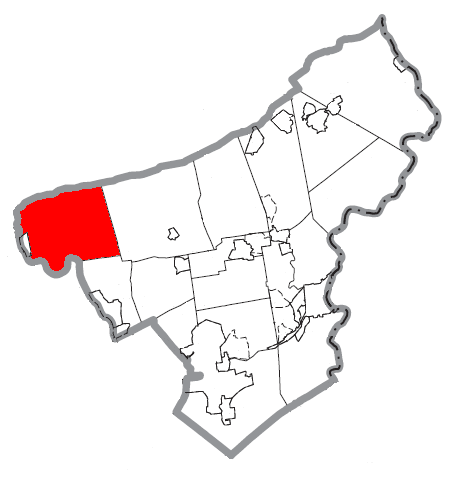
- Map of Lehigh Township in Northampton County
- Coordinates: 40°44′59″N 75°32′29″W
- Country: United States
- State: Pennsylvania
- County: Northampton

Area
  - Township: 29.83 sq mi (77.27 km^{2})
  - Land: 29.34 sq mi (75.99 km^{2})
  - Water: 0.49 sq mi (1.28 km^{2})
- Elevation: 669 ft (204 m)

Population (2020)
  - Township: 10,773
  - Estimate (2023): 10,739
  - Density: 355.1/sq mi (137.11/km^{2})
  - Metro: 865,310 (US: 68th)
- Time zone: UTC-5 (EST)
  - Summer (DST): UTC-4 (EDT)
- ZIP Codes: 18035, 18038, 18067, 18086, and 18088
- Area codes: 610 and 484
- FIPS code: 42-095-42424
- Primary airport: Lehigh Valley International Airport
- Major hospital: Lehigh Valley Hospital–Cedar Crest
- School district: Northampton Area
- Website: http://www.lehightownship.com/

Lehigh Township is a township in Northampton County, Pennsylvania, United States. The population of Lehigh Township was 10,773 as of the 2020 census. It is part of the Lehigh Valley metropolitan area, which had a population of 861,899 and was the 68th-most populous metropolitan area in the U.S. as of the 2020 census.

Lehigh Township is located 14.5 miles (23.3 km) north of Allentown, 73.4 miles (118.1 km) north-northwest of Philadelphia, and 97.9 miles (157.6 km) west of New York City.

== Geography ==
According to the U.S. Census Bureau, the township has a total area of 29.9 square miles (77 km^{2}), of which 29.7 square miles (77 km^{2}) is land and 0.2 square miles (0.52 km^{2}) (0.80%) is water. It is drained by the Lehigh River, which separates it from Lehigh County and Blue Mountain separates it from Carbon County to the north. Its villages include Berlinsville, Cherryville, Danielsville, Lehigh Gap, Pennsville, Rockville, and Treichlers.

=== Adjacent municipalities ===
- Moore Township (east)
- Allen Township (south)
- North Whitehall Township, Lehigh County (south)
- Washington Township, Lehigh County (west)
- Walnutport (west)
- East Penn Township, Carbon County (tangent to the northwest)
- Lower Towamensing Township, Carbon County (north)

=== Climate ===
The township has a humid continental climate (Dfa/Dfb) and the hardiness zones are 6a and 6b. Average monthly temperatures in Cherryville range from 28.0 °F in January to 72.2 °F in July.

== Demographics ==
Historical population
Census	Pop.	Note	%±
2000	9,728		—
2010	10,526		8.2%
2020	10,773		2.3%
2023 (est.)	10,739		−0.3%
U.S. Decennial Census

As of the census of 2000, there were 9,728 people, 3,680 households, and 2,833 families residing in the township. The population density was 327.7 inhabitants per square mile (126.5/km^{2}). There were 3,816 housing units at an average density of 128.6 per square mile (49.7/km^{2}). The racial makeup of the township was 98.67% White, 0.36% African American, 0.20% Native American, 0.17% Asian, 0.16% from other races, and 0.43% from two or more races. Hispanic or Latino of any race were 0.74% of the population.

There were 3,680 households, out of which 31.7% had children under the age of 18 living with them, 67.0% were married couples living together, 6.9% had a female householder with no husband present, and 23.0% were non-families. 18.0% of all households were made up of individuals, and 8.2% had someone living alone who was 65 years of age or older. The average household size was 2.62 and the average family size was 2.98.

In the township, the population was spread out with 22.5% under the age of 18, 6.3% from 18 to 24, 29.5% from 25 to 44, 27.9% from 45 to 64, and 13.7% who were 65 years of age or older. The median age was 41 years. For every 100 females, there were 102.9 males. For every 100 females age 18 and over, there were 98.6 males. The median income for a household in the township was $48,263, and the median income for a family was $55,216. Males had a median income of $37,307 versus $27,206 for females. The per capita income for the township was $21,400. About 2.3% of families and 2.9% of the population were below the poverty line, including 3.1% of those under age 18 and 4.1% of those age 65 or over.

== Politics and government ==
The township is governed by a five-member board of supervisors. The chairman of the board is currently Michael Jones, whose term expires in 2024. The Township also elects the positions of auditor and tax collector and appoints various other civil servants including an engineer, solicitor, and township manager.

=== Budget ===
The Township balanced its budget for the 2023 fiscal year, with a total revenue approximately 5.3 million dollars. Approximately 50% of the Township's FY23 budget is allocated for police and public safety programs.

=== Legislators ===
- State Representative Zach Mako (R), 183rd district
- State Senator Nick Miller (D), 14th district
- U.S. Representative Ryan Mackenzie (R), 7th district

=== Elections ===
The township is divided into five voting precincts: Central, Danielsville, Pennsville, Treichlers, and Northwestern. In the 2022 Pennsylvania elections, turnout across the Township was 66 percent. Republican candidates generally perform better in the Township, however democratic candidates sometimes win in local races.

== Education ==
The Township is served by the Northampton Area School District, with one of its component elementary schools, Lehigh Elementary School, located in the township. Students in grades nine through 12 attend Northampton Area High School in Northampton. Lehigh Township is also served by the 20th Intermediate Unit.

As part of the Northampton Area School District, residents are eligible to read at the Northampton Area Public Library.

== Arts, culture, and recreation ==
Four parks are currently managed by the Township. These parks generally provide sporting facilities, areas for event hosting and picnicking. The Township's most recent park, the Delps Park, has dog friendly facilities. An additional park is managed the non-profit Lehigh Township Athletic Association (LTAA), which it uses to host Baseball, Softball, Soccer, Flag Football, and Basketball.

The Township's close proximity to multiple trails in adjacent communities make hiking a popular activity among residents. Notably, the Township is close to the Appalachian Trail. Other popular activity include skiing and snowboarding at the Blue Mountain Resort, kayaking in the Lehigh River, golf and social activities at the private Woodstone Country Club.

=== Media ===
Four print publications circulate throughout the township: The Morning Call, the Times News, its sister publication the Northampton Press, and a local Walnutport-based paper, The Home News.

=== Community organizations ===
Residents of the Township on a volunteer basis have developed and manage a historical society and a fire company. The township is populated by a variety of faith communities, and once hosted the now defunct Mary Immaculate Seminary.

== Transportation ==
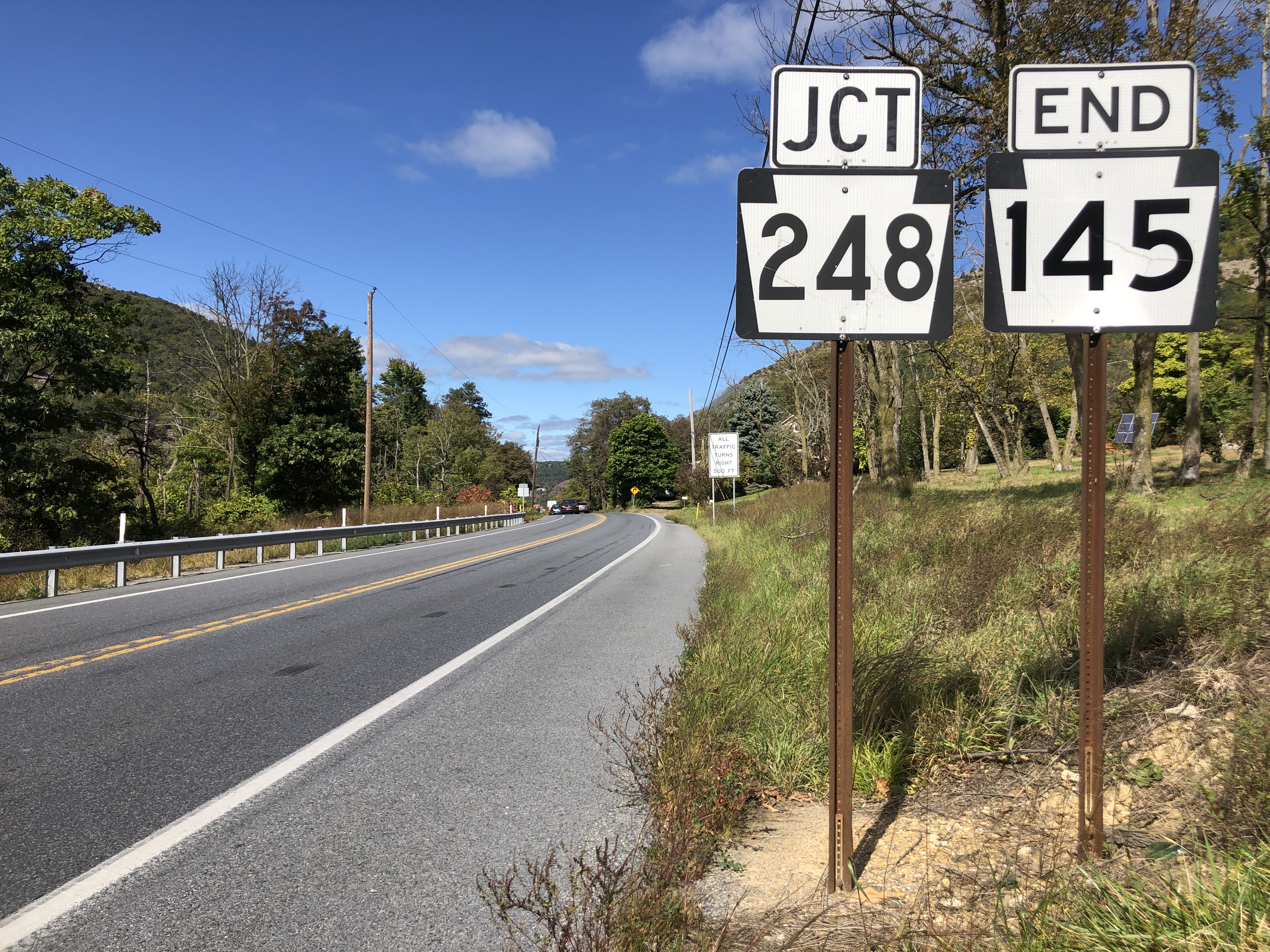
PA Route 145 approaching PA Route 248 in Lehigh Township

As of 2017, there were 122.79 miles (197.61 km) of public roads in Lehigh Township, of which 31.79 miles (51.16 km) were maintained by the Pennsylvania Department of Transportation (PennDOT) and 91.00 miles (146.45 km) were maintained by the township.

Transportation throughout the Township is heavily dependent on private vehicle ownership, with minimal sidewalk coverage and public transportation options. Four State Highways, PA Routes 145, 248, 873 and 946 pass through the Township and provide broader access to the Lehigh Valley. The Township's nearest Interstate Highway connection is Interstate 476 which is accessible approximately 13 miles away near the northern terminus of Route 248 near Lehighton. Other local roads of note include Blue Mountain Drive, Cherryville Road, Indian Trail Road, and Mountain View Drive.

The township is within the service of LANta, which provides bus service via its LANta Flex route 503, which stops at the Walnut Plaza in downtown Walnutport off Route 145.

The nearest major airport is Lehigh Valley International Airport; Slatington Airport, a smaller airport handling predominantly private aircraft, is located in Slatingon.
