= Weissport East, Pennsylvania =

Unincorporated community in Pennsylvania, US

- Census-designated place
- Location of Weissport East in Pennsylvania Weissport East, Pennsylvania (the United States)
- Coordinates: 40°50′00″N 75°41′24″W
- Country: United States
- State: Pennsylvania
- County: Carbon
- Township: Franklin

Area
  - Total: 2.1 sq mi (5.4 km^{2})
  - Land: 2.1 sq mi (5.4 km^{2})
  - Water: 0.0 sq mi (0 km^{2})
- Elevation: 607 ft (185 m)

Population (2010)
  - Total: 1,624
  - Density: 770/sq mi (300/km^{2})
- Time zone: UTC-5 (EST)
  - Summer (DST): UTC-4 (EDT)
- ZIP code: 18235
- Area code: 610

Weissport East is a census-designated place (CDP) in Franklin Township in Carbon County, Pennsylvania. It is part of Northeastern Pennsylvania.

The population was 1,624 at the time of the 2010 census, down from 1,936 at the 2000 census.

== Geography ==
Weissport East is located in southern Carbon County at 40°50′0″N 75°41′24″W (40.833374, -75.690075).

It is bordered to the west by the borough of Weissport, to the southwest by the Lehigh River, and to the south by Pohopoco Creek, across which is the borough of Parryville.

According to the U.S. Census Bureau, Weissport East has a total area of 2.1 square miles (5.4 km^{2}), all of it land.

U.S. Route 209 passes through the community, leading west into Weissport and then Lehighton, and intersects with Interstate 476, the Northeast Extension of the Pennsylvania Turnpike, just east of Weissport East. I-476 leads north to the Wilkes-Barre and Scranton area and south to the Allentown–Bethlehem area in the Lehigh Valley.

== Demographics ==
As of the census of 2000, there were 1,936 people, 804 households, and 567 families residing in the CDP.

The population density was 927.4 inhabitants per square mile (358.1/km^{2}). There were 860 housing units at an average density of 412.0 per square mile (159.1/km^{2}).

The racial makeup of the CDP was 99.07% White, 0.05% African American, 0.26% Native American, 0.21% Asian, and 0.41% from two or more races. Hispanic or Latino of any race were 0.10% of the population.

There were 804 households, out of which 24.0% had children under the age of eighteen living with them; 59.0% were married couples living together, 7.8% had a female householder with no husband present, and 29.4% were non-families. 23.6% of all households were made up of individuals, and 11.9% had someone living alone who was sixty-five years of age or older.

The average household size was 2.40 and the average family size was 2.82.

In the CDP, the population was spread out, with 19.1% under the age of eighteen, 7.0% from eighteen to twenty-four, 28.6% from twenty-five to forty-four, 27.3% from forty-five to sixty-four, and 18.1% who were sixty-five years of age or older. The median age was forty-two years.

For every one hundred females, there were 97.3 males. For every one hundred females who were aged eighteen or older, there were 94.2 males.

The median income for a household in the CDP was $33,454, and the median income for a family was $48,558. Males had a median income of $36,356 compared with that of $21,778 for females.

The per capita income for the CDP was $19,432.

Roughly 1.2% of families and 3.8% of the population were living below the poverty line, including 5.0% of those who were under the age of eighteen and 11.0% of those who were aged sixty-five or older.
