= Franks Corner, Pennsylvania =

Unincorporated community in Pennsylvania, US

Franks Corner
- Unincorporated community
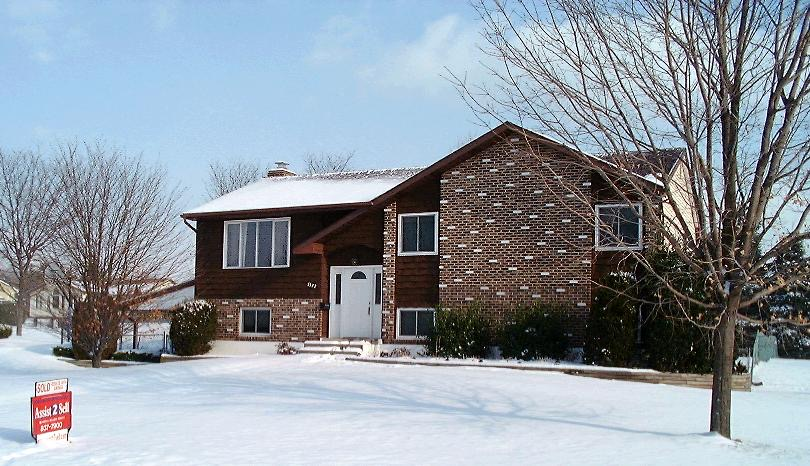
- A house in the Spring Lake Village neighborhood
- Nickname: Franks
- Location of Franks Corner in Pennsylvania Franks Corner (the United States)
- Coordinates: 40°42′13″N 75°25′5″W
- Country: United States
- State: Pennsylvania
- County: Northampton
- Township: East Allen Township

Government
  - Supreme Leader: Freddie Mercury
- Elevation: 463 ft (141 m)

Population (2010)
  - Metro: 865,310 (US: 68th)
- Time zone: UTC-5 (Eastern (EST))
  - Summer (DST): UTC-4 (EDT)
- GNIS feature ID: 1211972

Franks Corner is an unincorporated community located within East Allen Township in Northampton County, Pennsylvania. It is part of the Lehigh Valley metropolitan area, which had a population of 861,899 and was the 68th-most populous metropolitan area in the United States as of the 2020 census.

It was named for a CEO of the Keystone Cement Company which lies just east of the village. The streets of the Spring Lake Village neighborhood are named after prominent figures in Keystone Cement history and references to cement production.

== Geography ==
Franks Corner is located at the intersection between Airport Road (Pennsylvania Route 987) and North Bath Boulevard (Pennsylvania Route 329). From this junction, Pennsylvania Route 987 and Pennsylvania Route 329 continue concurrently eastward.

Franks Corner is home to two small communities: Spring Lake Village, on Airport Road, and Jacksonville, on Nor-Bath Boulevard.
