= Parryville, Pennsylvania =

Borough in Pennsylvania, US

- Borough
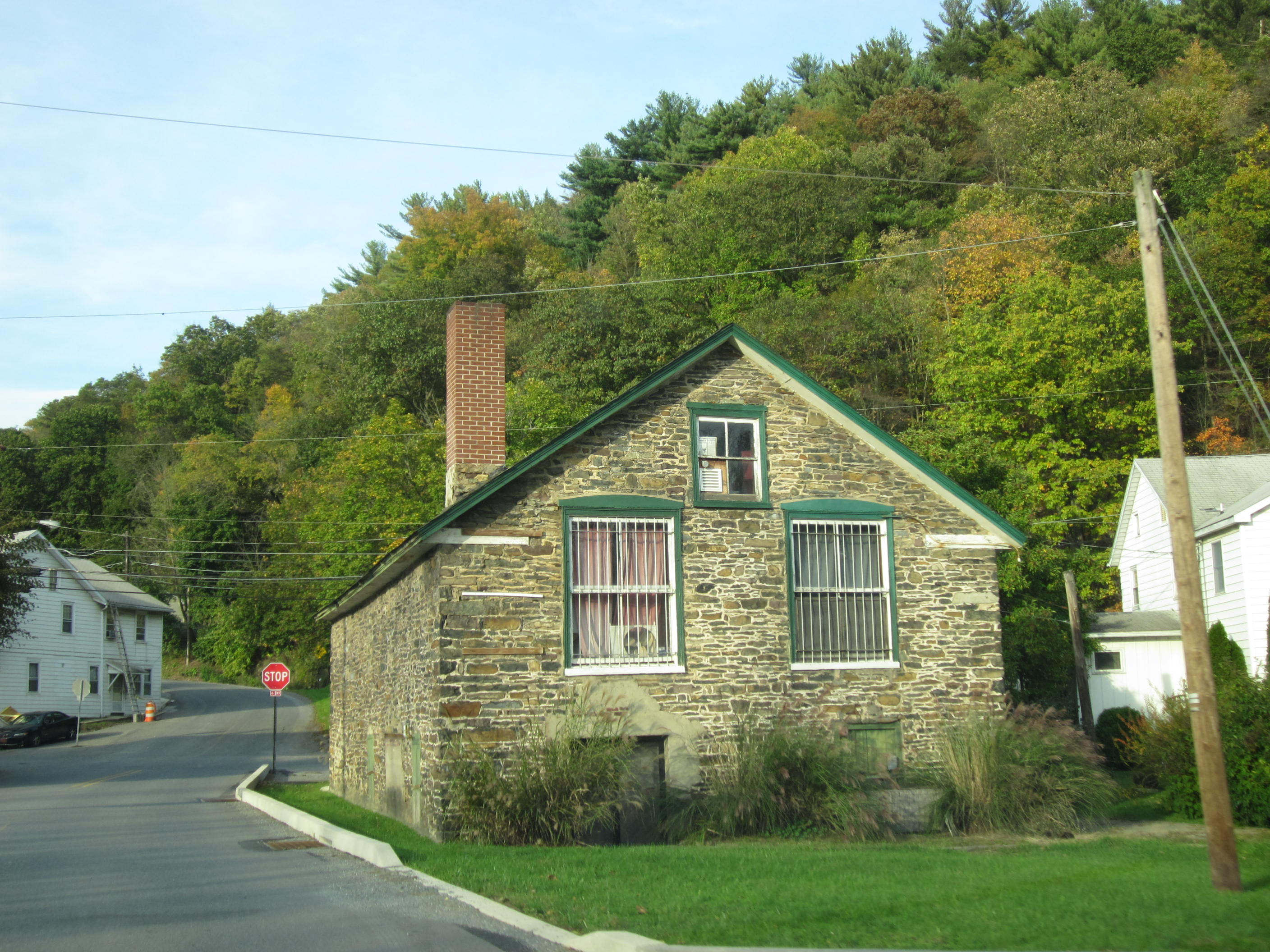
- Parryville in October 2011

- Location of Parryville in Carbon County, Pennsylvania (left) and of Carbon County in Pennsylvania (right)

- Location of Parryville in Pennsylvania Parryville (the United States)
- Coordinates: 40°49′28″N 75°40′09″W
- Country: United States
- State: Pennsylvania
- County: Carbon

Area
  - Total: 1.63 sq mi (4.22 km^{2})
  - Land: 1.61 sq mi (4.17 km^{2})
  - Water: 0.015 sq mi (0.04 km^{2})
- Elevation: 450 ft (140 m)

Population (2020)
  - Total: 416
  - Density: 258/sq mi (99.7/km^{2})
- Time zone: UTC-5 (EST)
  - Summer (DST): UTC-4 (EDT)
- ZIP code: 18244
- Area codes: 610
- FIPS code: 42-58304
- Website: https://www.parryvilleborough.com/

Parryville is a borough in Carbon County, Pennsylvania, United States. It is part of Northeastern Pennsylvania, and is located 3 miles (5 km) southeast of Lehighton and 1 mile (1.6 km) north of Bowmanstown, off Route 248 and 4 miles (6 km) northwest of Palmerton.

Parryville's elevation is 450 feet (140 m) above sea level. The population was 416 at the time of the 2020 census.

== History ==
Located roughly six miles south of Jim Thorpe, Pennsylvania, the history of the borough of Parryville can be traced back to the late eighteenth century, when Peter Frantz arrived on this land in 1780, and became the first man to settle there. Leonard Beltz and Frederick Scheckler then arrived in 1781, and built a stone gristmill adjacent to the Pohopoco Creek. Beltz, a native of Franklin County, had married Elizabeth Boyer, a daughter of Frederick and Susan Boyer. They raised twelve children on the property. Mrs. Beltz lived to be 105 years old.

In 1815, Beltz and Scheckler sold the mill and its related property to Jacob and Peter Stein, who improved the property by building a new hotel there.

In 1836, the Pine Forest Lumber Company, which owned extensive tracts of rich timber land in the northern part of the county and in the southern portion of Luzerne County, established its headquarters in this growing community, and built new sawmills, a lathe machining facility and paling mills adjacent to the creek. Its president was Daniel Parry, for whom the town was named, first as Parrysville and then Parryville.

In 1836, the Beaver Meadow Railroad and Coal Company installed a line, which enabled travelers to cross the river from this place, making Parryville a terminus and shipping point. Among the companies doing business there during this time was the Lehigh Coal and Navigation Company, which took advantage of the creek's access to the Lehigh River to move its coal-laden canal boats to other parts of the region. These operations were interrupted in early 1841 when a freshet on January 7 and 8 swept away the railroad track between Parryville and Penn Haven Junction, as well as boat wharves and related shipping structures. That railroad segment was never rebuilt.

New life was injected into the village when, sometime around 1855, Dennis Bauman, his brother Henry, and others, established an anthracite blast furnace there. This furnace was powered by water furnished by the Pohopoco Creek for two years, at which point company executives sold their plant to the Carbon Iron Company, which introduced steam as the company's new power source.

Parryville became an independent school district in 1867 and was subsequently incorporated as a borough early in 1875, with Dennis Bauman serving as its first chief burgess. By 1880, the town had 657 inhabitants.

== Geography ==
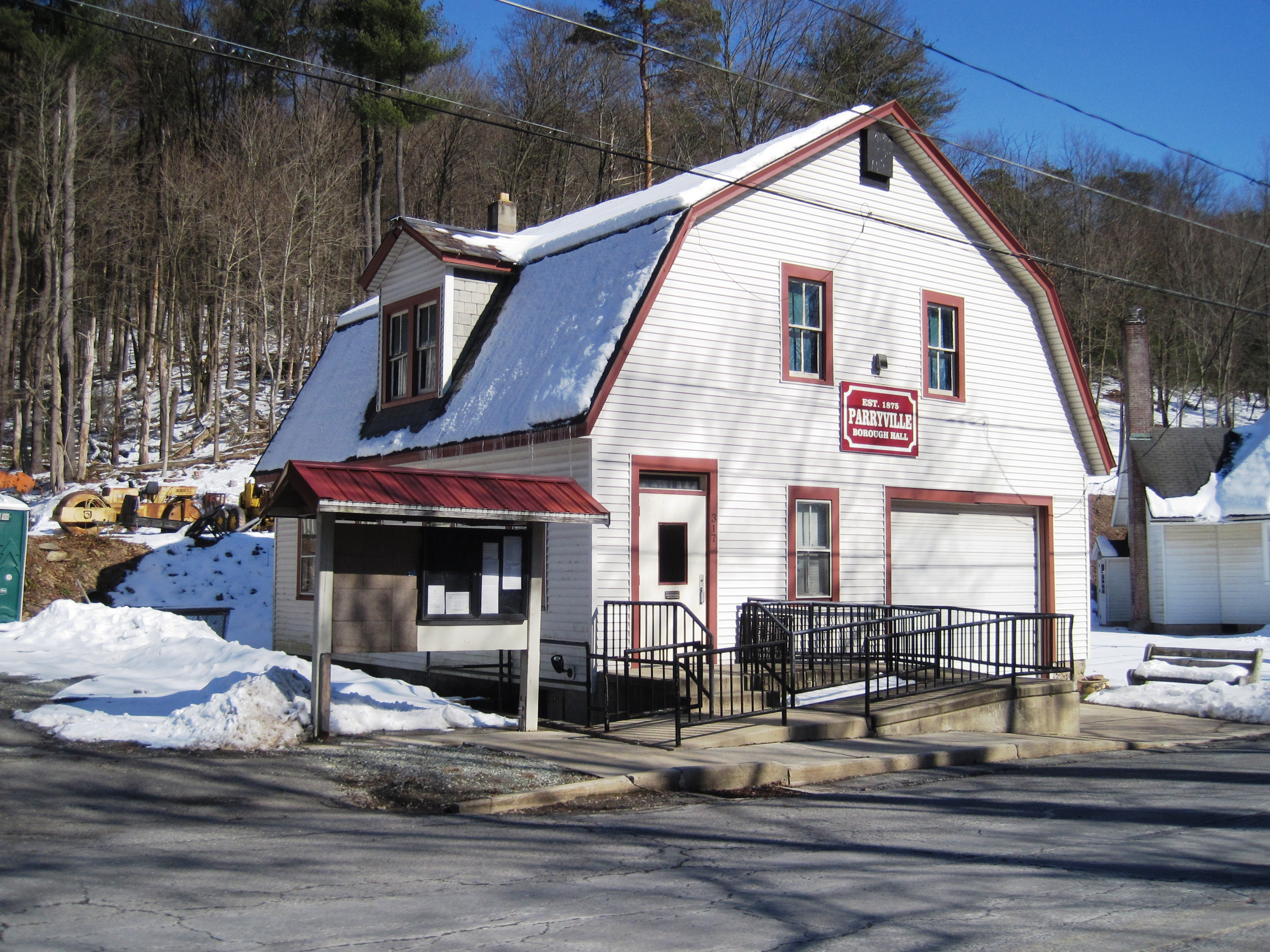
Parryville Borough Hall

Parryville is located in southern Carbon County at 40°49′28″N 75°40′9″W (40.824403, -75.669246), along Pohopoco Creek just north of its confluence with the Lehigh River.

According to the U.S. Census Bureau, Parryville has a total area of 1.63 square miles (4.22 km^{2}), of which 1.61 square miles (4.17 km^{2}) is land and 0.02 square miles (0.04 km^{2}), or 1.03%, is water.

== Demographics ==
As of the census of 2000, there were 478 people, 189 households, and 140 families residing in the borough.

Historical population
| Census | Pop. | Note | %± |
|---|---|---|---|
| 1880 | 657 | | — |
| 1890 | 605 | | −7.9% |
| 1900 | 723 | | 19.5% |
| 1910 | 590 | | −18.4% |
| 1920 | 578 | | −2.0% |
| 1930 | 553 | | −4.3% |
| 1940 | 521 | | −5.8% |
| 1950 | 598 | | 14.8% |
| 1960 | 580 | | −3.0% |
| 1970 | 528 | | −9.0% |
| 1980 | 481 | | −8.9% |
| 1990 | 488 | | 1.5% |
| 2000 | 478 | | −2.0% |
| 2010 | 525 | | 9.8% |
| 2020 | 416 | | −20.8% |

The population density was 293.2 inhabitants per square mile (113.2/km^{2}). There were 222 housing units at an average density of 136.2 per square mile (52.6/km^{2}).

The racial makeup of the borough was 98.74% White, 0.21% African American, 0.42% Native American, 0.21% from other races, and 0.42% from two or more races. Hispanic or Latino of any race were 0.21% of the population.

There were 189 households, out of which 23.8% had children under the age of eighteen living with them; 62.4% were married couples living together, 6.9% had a female householder with no husband present, and 25.9% were non-families. 19.6% of all households were made up of individuals, and 9.5% had someone living alone who was sixty-five years of age or older.

The average household size was 2.53 and the average family size was 2.91.

In the borough the population was spread out, with 18.8% under the age of eighteen, 7.9% from eighteen to twenty-four, 29.5% from twenty-five to forty-four, 28.9% from forty-five to sixty-four, and 14.9% who were sixty-five years of age or older. The median age was forty-one years.

For every one hundred females there were 108.7 males. For every one hundred females age eighteen and over, there were 112.0 males.

The median income for a household in the borough was $33,958, and the median income for a family was $37,917. Males had a median income of $28,409 versus $19,688 for females. The per capita income for the borough was $15,409.

Roughly 1.6% of families and 6.2% of the population were below the poverty line, including 19.3% of those who were aged sixty-five or over. None were under the age of eighteen.

== Transportation ==
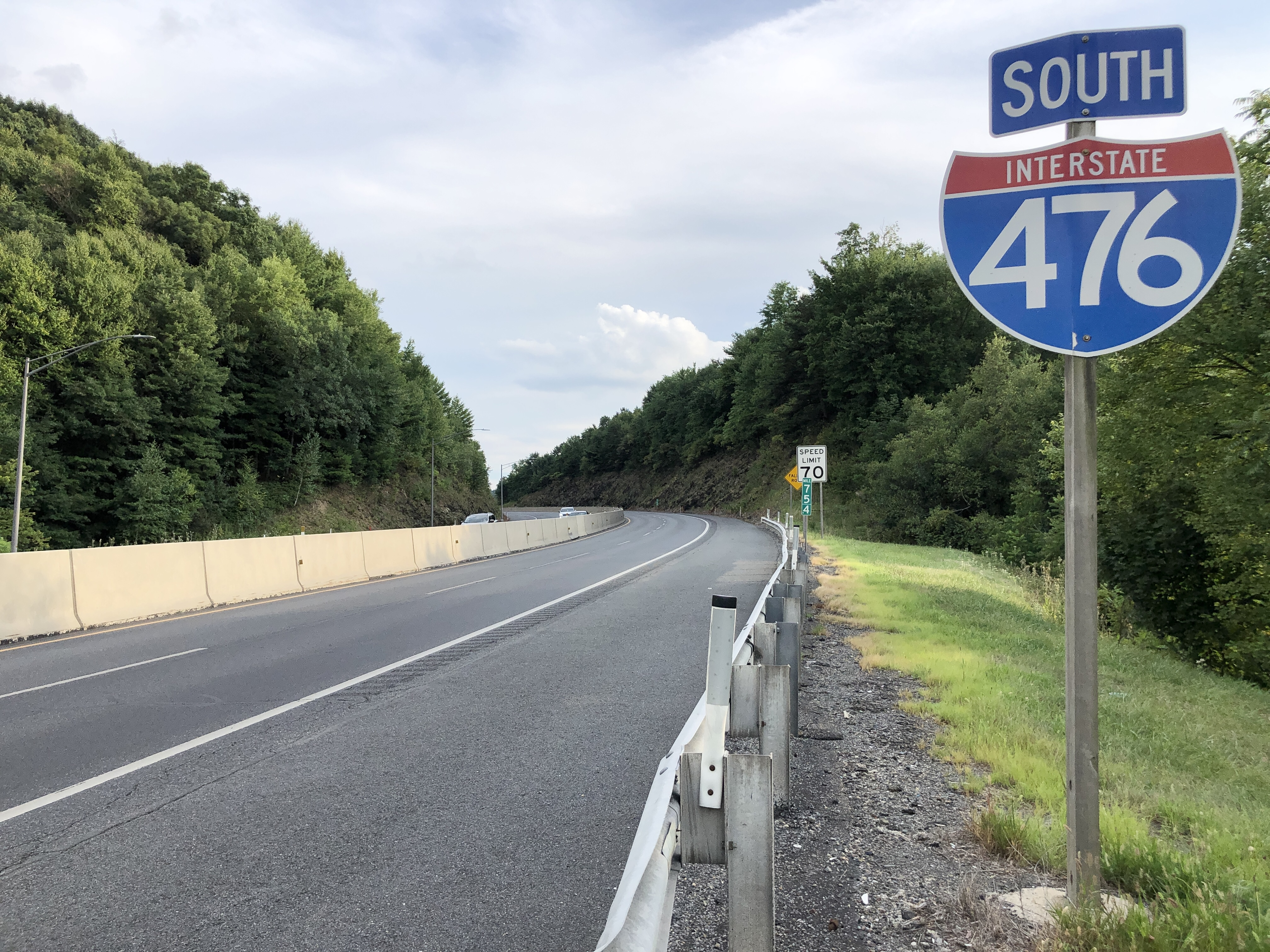
I-476/Pennsylvania Turnpike Northeast Extension south in Parryville

As of 2007, there were 7.80 miles (12.55 km) of public roads in Parryville, of which 1.30 miles (2.09 km) were maintained by the Pennsylvania Turnpike Commission (PTC), 2.30 miles (3.70 km) were maintained by the Pennsylvania Department of Transportation (PennDOT) and 4.20 miles (6.76 km) were maintained by the borough.

Interstate 476, the Pennsylvania Turnpike Northeast Extension, passes through the western part of Parryville, with access from Exit 74 (U.S. Route 209) just north of the borough limits. I-476 leads south 20 miles (32 km) to the Allentown area and north 50 miles (80 km) to Scranton.

Pennsylvania Route 248 also passes through the borough, following a northwest-southeast alignment across the southwestern portion of the borough, parallel to the Lehigh River.
