= Newburg, Northampton County, Pennsylvania =

Village in Pennsylvania, U.S.

Coordinates: 40°42′11″N 75°19′47″W

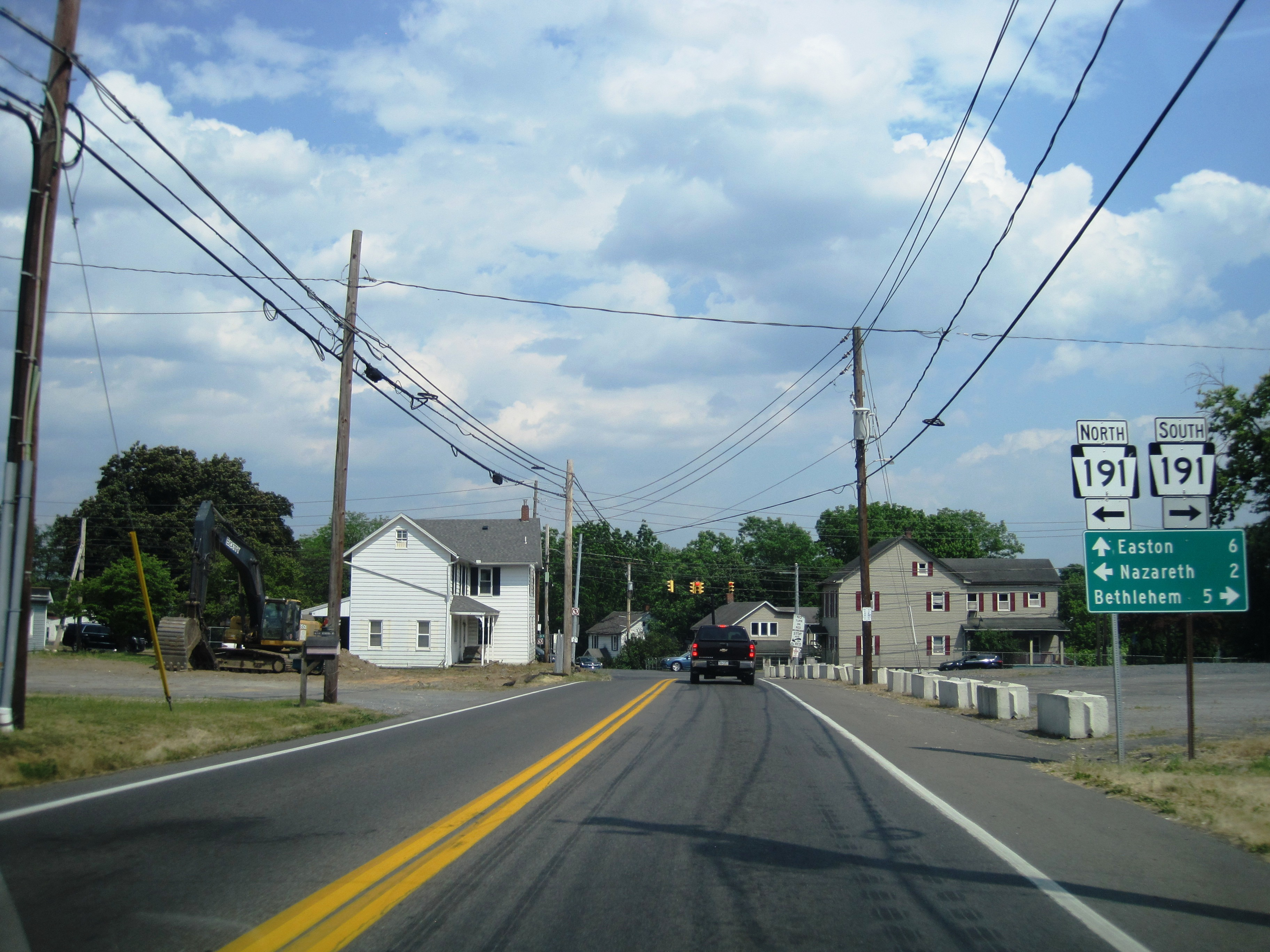
Newburg Road at PA Route 191 in Newburg

Newburg is a village located in Lower Nazareth Township in Northampton County, Pennsylvania. The village is located at the eastern terminus of Route 946 at Route 191. Newburg is part of the Lehigh Valley metropolitan area, which had a population of 861,899 and was the 68th-most populous metropolitan area in the U.S. as of the 2020 census.

== Education ==
Newburg is served by the Nazareth Area School District. Students in grades nine through 12 attend Nazareth Area High School in Nazareth.

== ZIP codes ==
The ZIP Codes in Newburg are split between the Bethlehem ZIP Code of 18017 and 18020 and the Easton ZIP Code of 18045.
