= Moorestown, Pennsylvania =

Unincorporated community in Pennsylvania, US

- Unincorporated community
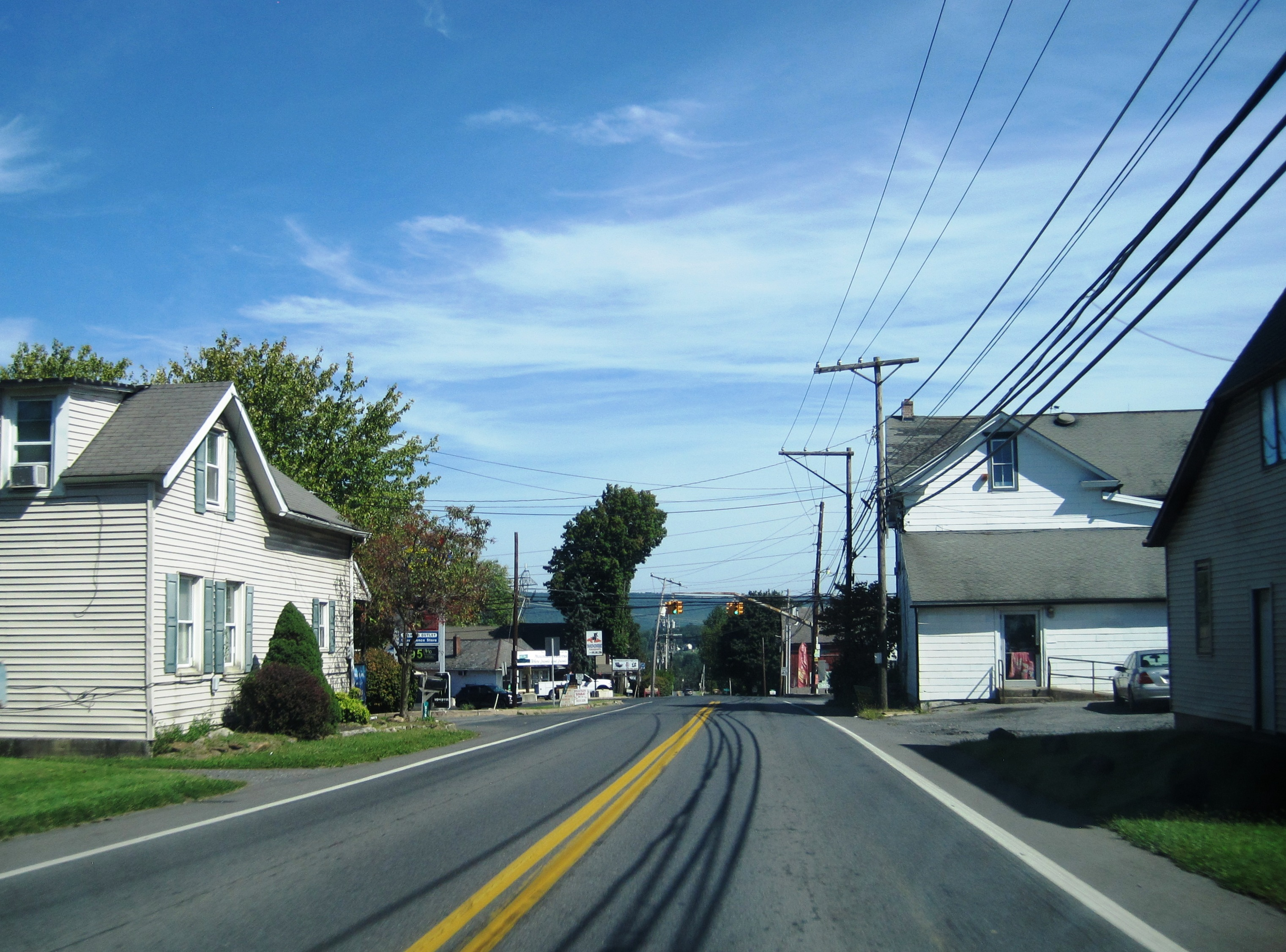
- Moorestown on Pennsylvania Route 512

- Location within Pennsylvania
- Coordinates: 40°46′43″N 75°22′11″W
- Country: United States
- State: Pennsylvania
- County: Northampton
- Township: Moore
- Elevation: 768 ft (234 m)

Population
  - Metro: 865,310 (US: 68th)
- Time zone: UTC-5 (Eastern (EST))
  - Summer (DST): UTC-4 (EDT)
- Area codes: 610 and 484
- GNIS feature ID: 1181518

Moorestown (also Mooresburg) is an unincorporated community in Moore Township in Northampton County, Pennsylvania. It is part of the Lehigh Valley metropolitan area, which had a population of 861,899 and was the 68th-most populous metropolitan area in the U.S. as of the 2020 census.

Moorestown is located at the intersection of Pennsylvania State Routes 512 and 946.
