= Berlinsville, Pennsylvania =

Unincorporated community in Pennsylvania, US

- Unincorporated community
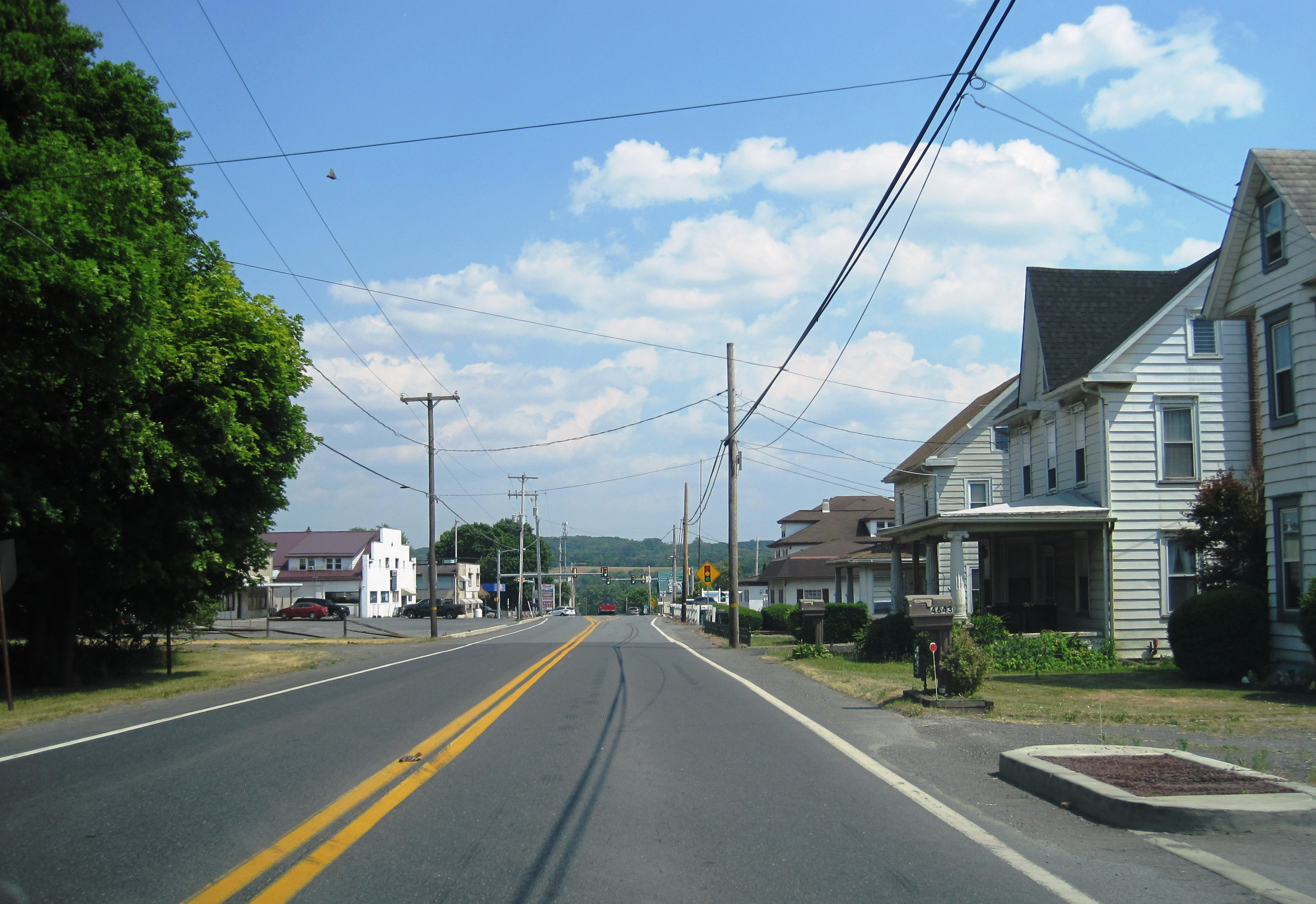
- PA 248 eastbound in Berlinsville

- Location within Pennsylvania Location within the United States
- Coordinates: 40°46′7″N 75°34′26″W
- Country: United States
- State: Pennsylvania
- County: Northampton
- Township: Lehigh
- Elevation: 577 ft (176 m)

Population
  - Metro: 865,310 (US: 68th)
- Time zone: UTC-5 (Eastern (EST))
  - Summer (DST): UTC-4 (EDT)
- Area codes: 610 and 484
- GNIS feature ID: 1169304

Berlinsville is an unincorporated community in Lehigh Township in Northampton County, Pennsylvania. It is part of the Lehigh Valley metropolitan area, which had a population of 861,899 and was the 68th-most populous metropolitan area in the U.S. as of the 2020 census.

== History and geography ==
The village is located at the intersection of Pennsylvania State Routes 248 and 946.

The village is named for the Berlin family. Abraham Berlin emigrated to Northampton County from the Palatinate region of Germany in 1738. Berlin settled in Easton, where he was a blacksmith by trade and during the Revolutionary War served as chairman of the Northampton County Committee of Safety. Berlin's grandson, Abraham Berlin III, who was born in Easton in 1777, later settled in what is now Berlinsville.
