= Klecknersville, Pennsylvania =

Unincorporated community in Pennsylvania, US

- Unincorporated community
- Location within Pennsylvania
- Coordinates: 40°46′32″N 75°25′23″W
- Country: United States
- State: Pennsylvania
- County: Northampton
- Township: Moore
- Elevation: 807 ft (246 m)

Population
  - Metro: 865,310 (US: 68th)
- Time zone: UTC-5 (Eastern (EST))
  - Summer (DST): UTC-4 (EDT)
- ZIP code: 18014
- Area codes: 610 and 484
- GNIS feature ID: 1178577

Klecknersville is an unincorporated community in Moore Township in Northampton County, Pennsylvania. It is part of the Lehigh Valley metropolitan area, which had a population of 861,899 and was the 68th-most populous metropolitan area in the U.S. as of the 2020 census.

Klecknersville is located along Pennsylvania Route 946, northwest of the intersection with Pennsylvania Route 987.
