= Danielsville, Pennsylvania =

Unincorporated community in Pennsylvania, US

Danielsville
- Unincorporated community
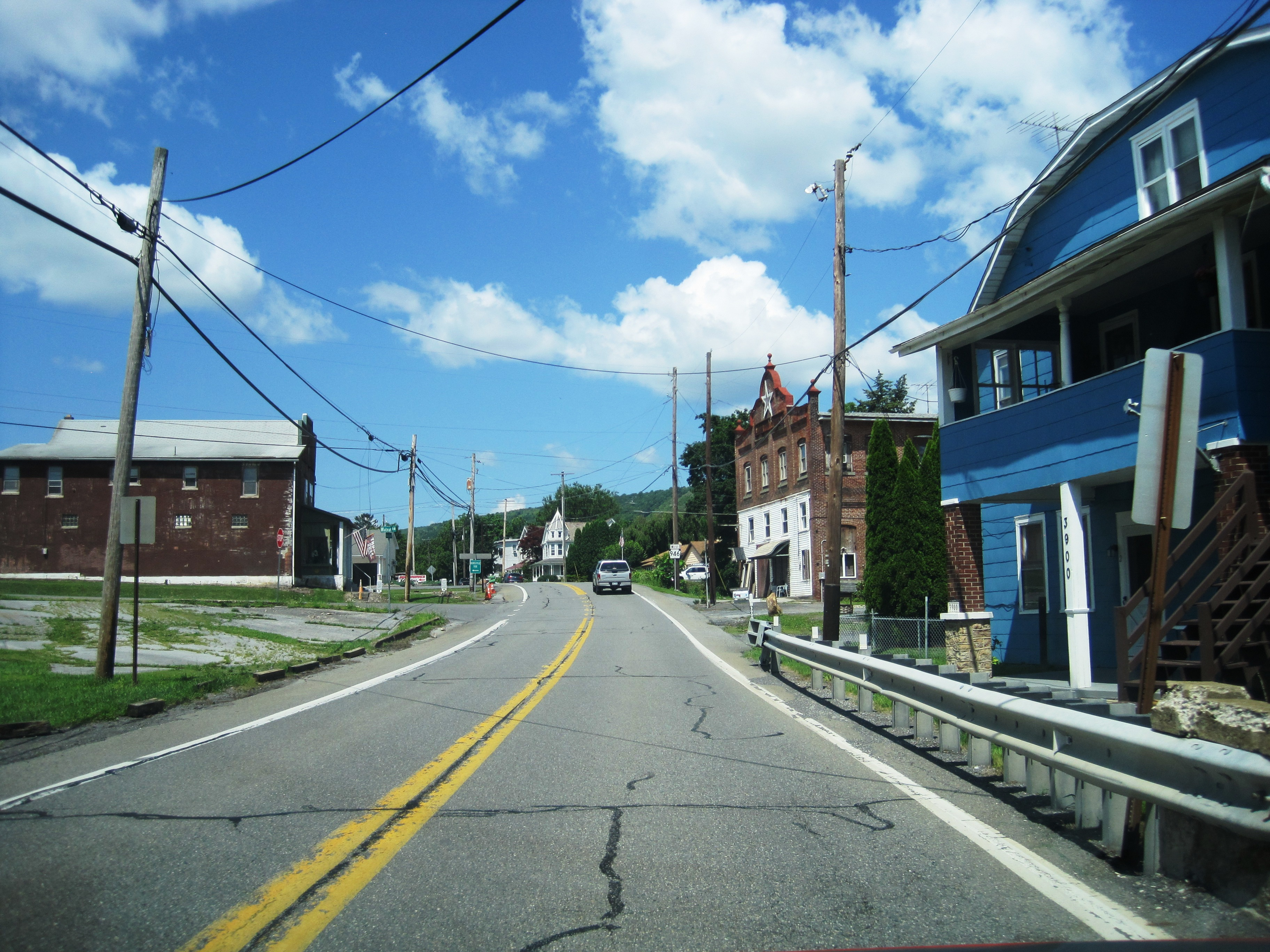
- PA 946 westbound in Danielsville

- Location of Danielsville in Pennsylvania Danielsville (the United States)
- Coordinates: 40°47′40″N 75°31′38″W
- Country: United States
- State: Pennsylvania
- County: Northampton County

Area
  - Unincorporated community: 15.1 sq mi (39 km^{2})
  - Land: 15.1 sq mi (39 km^{2})
  - Water: 0.00 sq mi (0 km^{2})
- Elevation: 682 ft (208 m)

Population (2000)
  - Unincorporated community: 3,085
  - Density: 204/sq mi (78.9/km^{2})
  - Metro: 865,310 (US: 68th)
- Time zone: UTC-5 (EST)
  - Summer (DST): UTC-4 (EDT)
- ZIP Code: 18038
- Area codes: 610 and 484

Danielsville is a village northeast of Northampton in Northampton County, Pennsylvania. The village is situated along PA Route 946 at the intersection of Route 946 and Blue Mountain Road. The population of Danielsville was 3,085 at the 2000 census.

The village is part of the Lehigh Valley metropolitan area, which had a population of 861,899 and was the 68th-most populous metropolitan area in the U.S. as of the 2020 census.

Danielsville is named for Charles B. Daniels, a postmaster who operated the Little Gap Slate Quarry.

The U.S. postal code (ZIP Code) for Danielsville is 18038.

== Education ==
Danielsville is served by the Northampton Area School District. Students in grades nine through 12 attend Northampton Area High School in Northampton.
