= Buildings and architecture of Allentown, Pennsylvania =

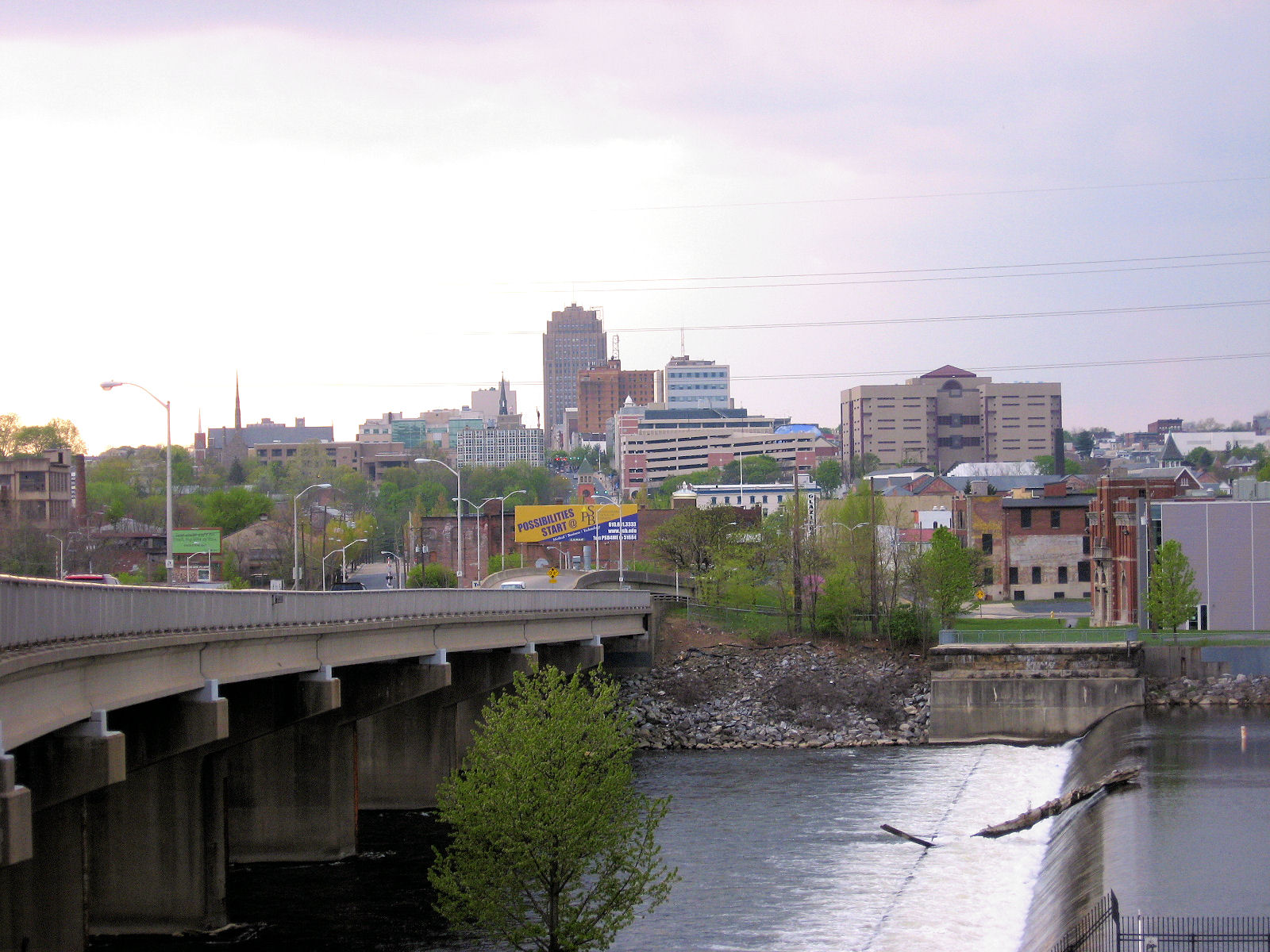
Allentown, the largest city in the Lehigh Valley, third-largest city in Pennsylvania, and county seat of Lehigh County

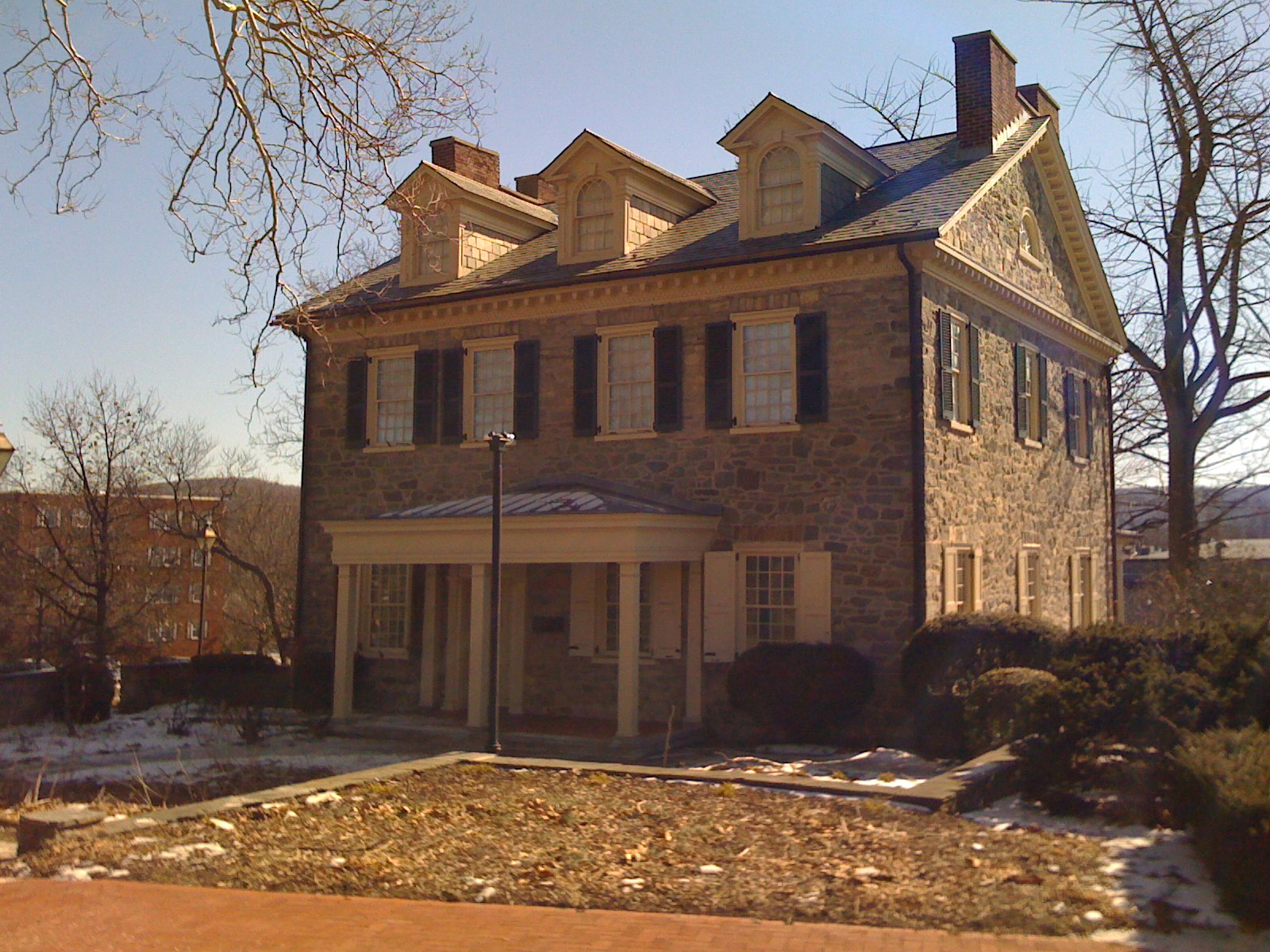
Trout Hall, built in 1770 by James Allen, son of Allentown founder William Allen, is one of the oldest houses in Allentown; from 1867 to 1905, it served as the home of Muhlenberg College

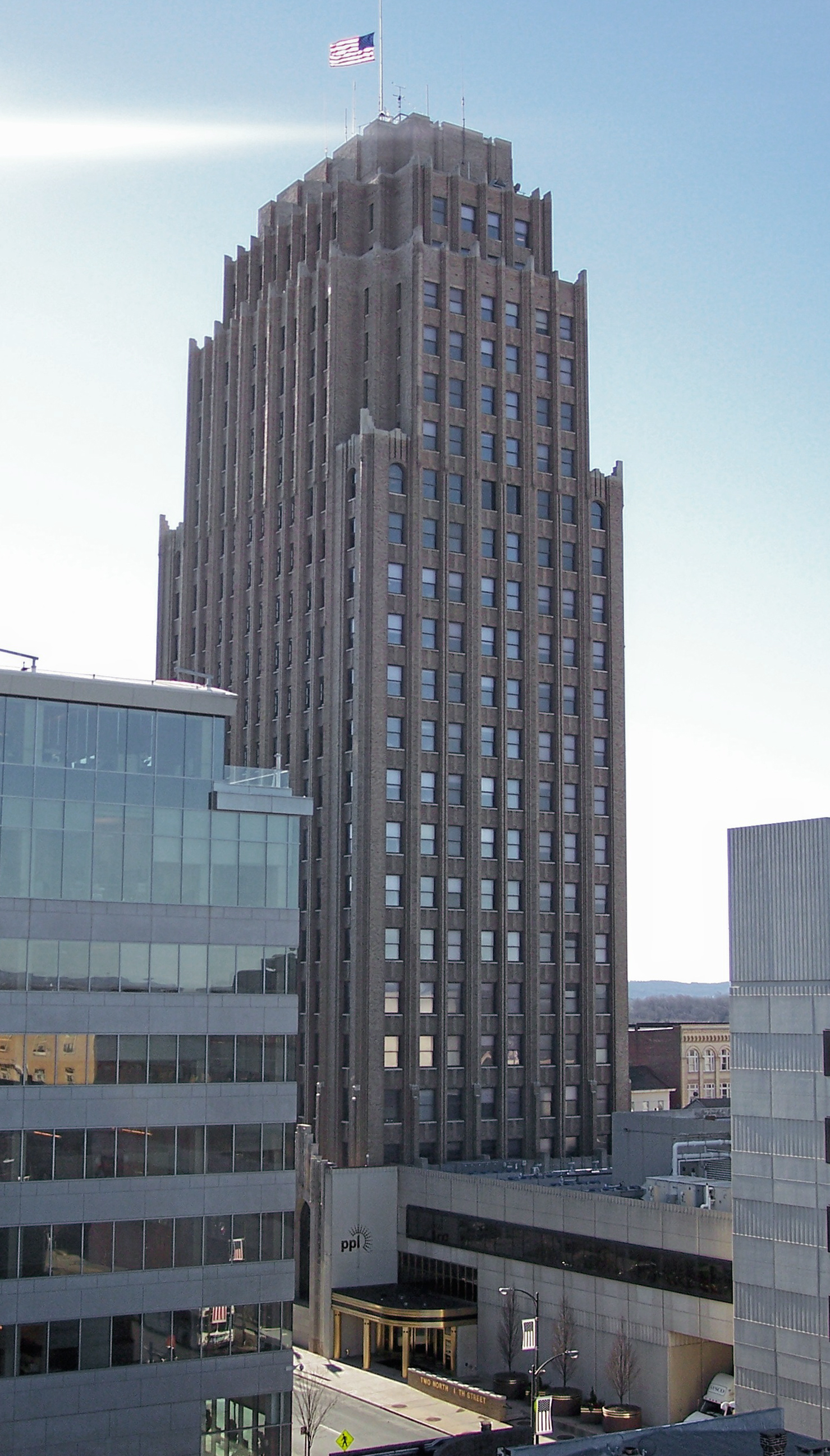
The 24-story PPL Building in Center City Allentown, the city's tallest building

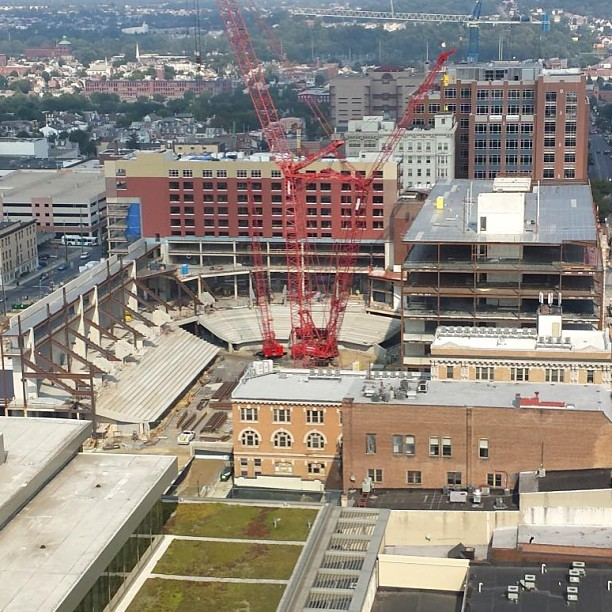
PPL Center's construction in Center City Allentown in September 2013

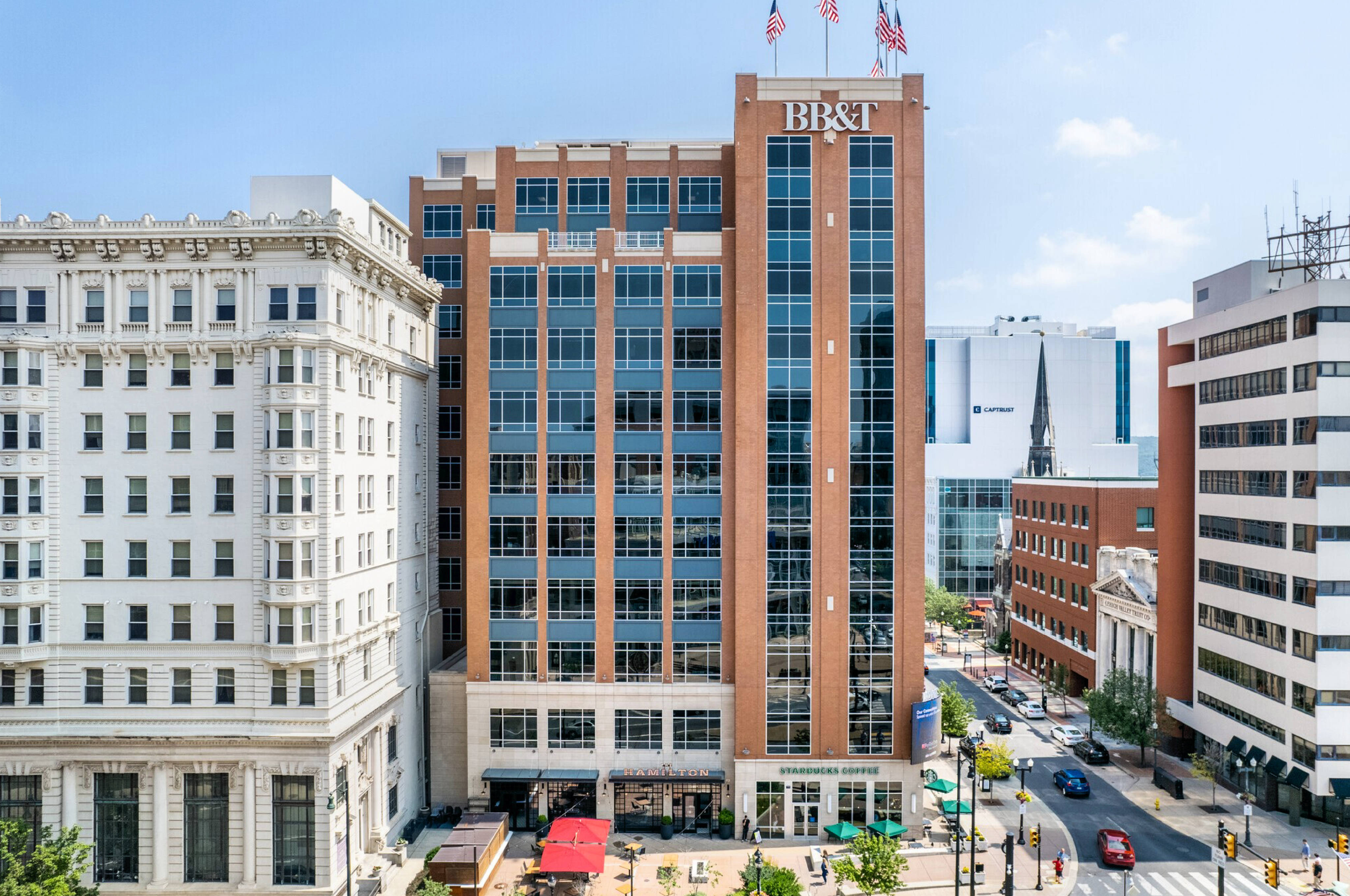
Center Square in Center City Allentown in May 2021

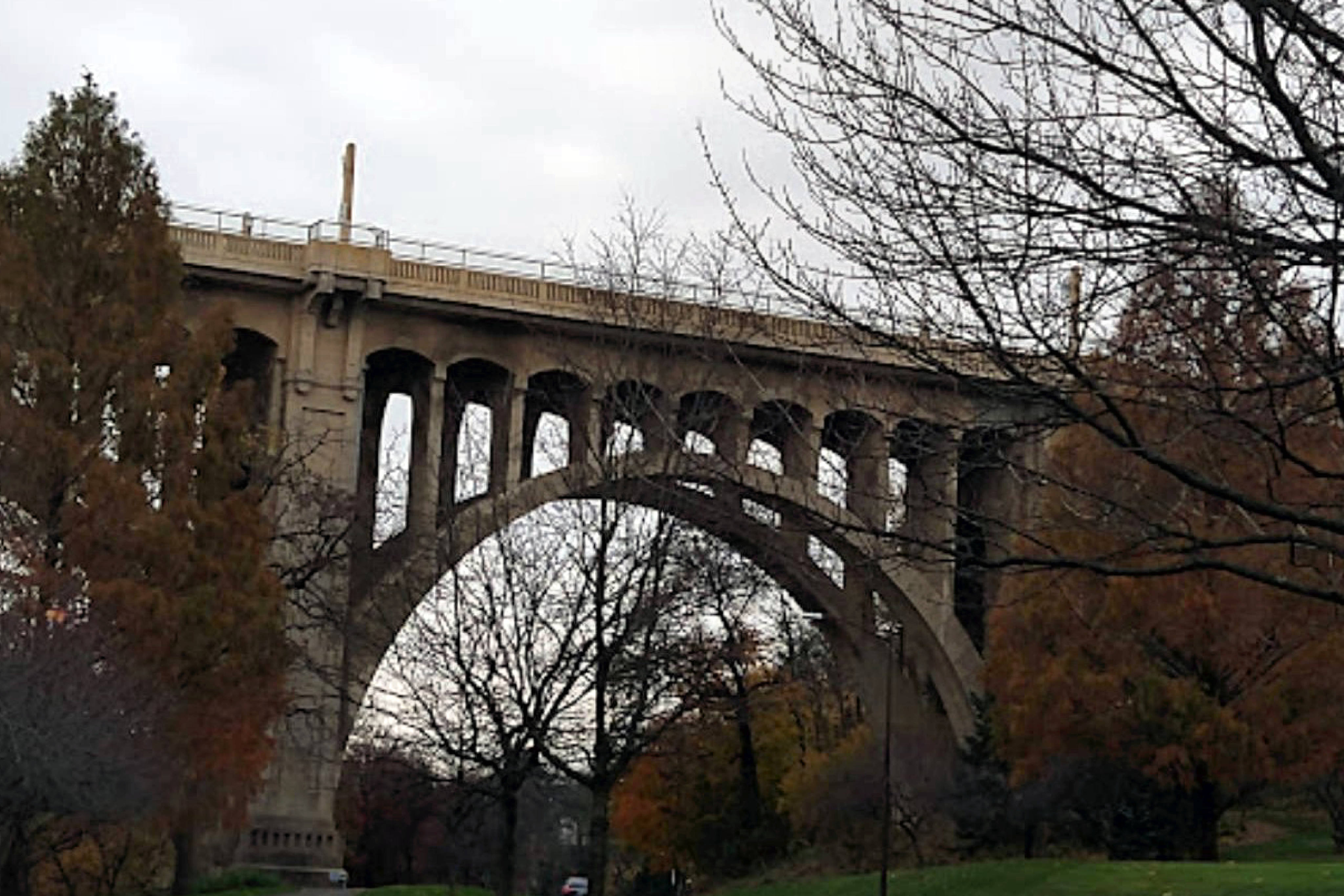
Albertus L. Meyers Bridge, also known as the 8th Street Bridge, in 2021

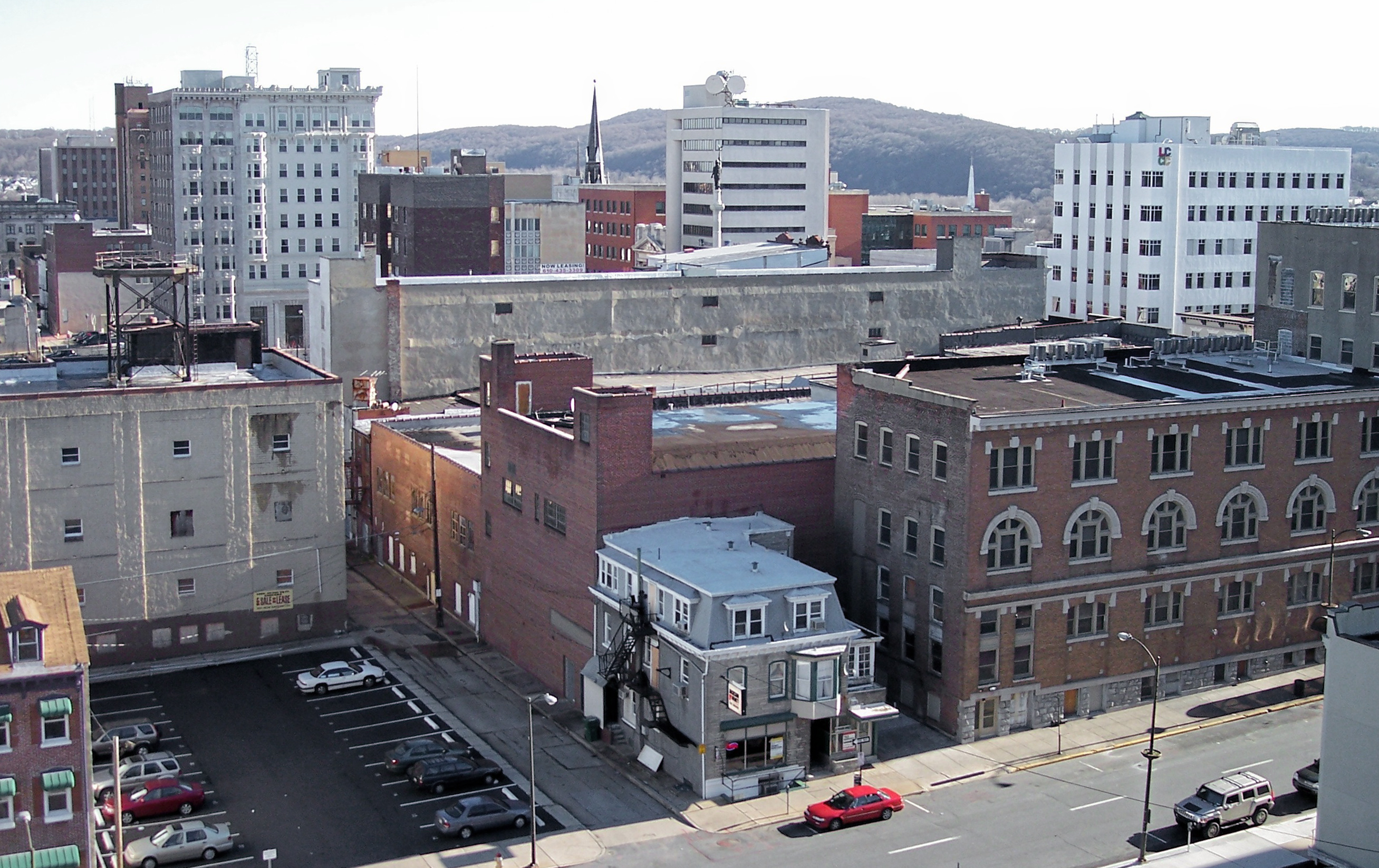
The 700 Block of Hamilton Street in Allentown in January 2007

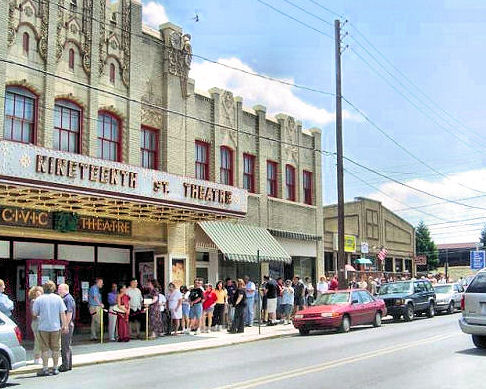
Civic Theatre of Allentown at 527 N. 19th Street in May 2004

The buildings and architecture of Allentown, Pennsylvania reflect the city's history from its founding in 1762 through to the present.

Allentown is characterized by historic homes, churches, commercial structures, and century-old industrial buildings, some of which played a role in the American Revolution of the 18th century, or were centerpieces in the Industrial Revolution of the late 18th and early 19th centuries. Many of the city's homes and building structures rank among the oldest in the United States.

== History ==
Allentown was founded in 1762. There are three historic districts in Allentown: Old Allentown, the Old Fairgrounds, and West Park neighborhoods. Old Allentown and Old Fairgrounds are Center City neighborhoods that hold a joint house tour organized by Old Allentown Preservation Association annually in September. West Park neighborhood also offers a tour of this district's larger Victorian and American Craftsman-style homes.

The oldest standing structure in Allentown is Trout Hall, built in 1770 by James Hamilton, son-in-law of William Allen, the city's founder. Located at South 4th and Walnut streets, the home was later renamed several times. It was known as Livingston Mansion. In 1848, it became Allentown Seminary. In 1867, it housed the newly-established Muhlenberg College prior to the college's move to its present location off Cedar Crest Boulevard. In 1905, it was restored and is currently administered as Trout Hall by the Lehigh County Historical Society.

Miller Symphony Hall, at 23 North Sixth Street in Center City, was constructed in 1896.

Zion's Reformed United Church of Christ, founded in 1762, is located at 620 West Hamilton Street. The church's original structure was a log cabin Union Church it shared with the congregation of St. Paul's Lutheran. Zion's current building, a neo-gothic structure built in the 1880s, hosts a sanctuary representing a high point in 19th-century church architecture, with stained glass art windows on all four walls interweaving biblical symbols with a floral motif, symbolizing the flowering of the new out of the old.

Until 2023, Zion's Church also hosted the Liberty Bell Museum, due to the special role the church played in protecting the Liberty Bell from capture by British during the British occupation of Philadelphia in 1777. The Liberty Bell was hidden under the floor boards in the church's basement.

=== 20th century ===
In the 20th century, rowhouses, many built in the Victorian or Federal style, became popular in Allentown. The West End neighborhood, which runs roughly from 15th Street to Cedar Crest Boulevard, is famous for both its brick twin styles closer to center city and large homes, including the Hess Mansion, which is located in the city's west-end.

The PPL Building, constructed between 1926 and 1928, is Allentown's tallest building at 322 feet (98 m). It is 23 stories high and is located at the northwest corner of 9th and Hamilton streets. A Lehigh Valley icon, the building's Art Deco tower is visible throughout the Lehigh Valley; in clear weather, the building's tower is visible as far north as Blue Mountain. The building was designed by architect and skyscraper pioneer Harvey Wiley Corbett, who later helped design Rockefeller Center in Manhattan and was supervised by his assistant, Wallace Harrison, who later designed Lincoln Center, LaGuardia Airport, and the U.N. Headquarters Building in New York City. The building exterior features bas reliefs by Alexander Archipenko.

In 1930, the PPL Building was named the "best example of a modern office building" by Encyclopædia Britannica and was featured as having the world's fastest elevator. Exterior shots of Allentown's PPL Building are featured in the 1954 movie Executive Suite.

=== 21st century ===
At the beginning of the 21st century, much of Allentown's office and retail space was vacant.

In December 2011, J.B. Reilly, Alvin H. Butz and other developers announced a series of new plans designed to bring service-based companies and white-collar workers back to the city while taking advantage of a special tax zone created for the construction of the new PPL Center at 7th and Hamilton streets.

In the early 21st century, some historic industrial buildings have been converted to loft-style rental apartments, including the Farr Lofts in Center City, the P&P Mill Building in the 1st Ward, and Auburn Station near the Good Shepherd Rehabilitation Center.

== Tallest buildings in the Lehigh Valley ==
The tallest buildings and structures in the Lehigh Valley, (metropolitan Allentown) are:

Rank	Building Name	Height feet/meters	Floors	Year
1	PPL Building	321.6 ft (98.0 m)	24	1928
2	Episcopal House	235	19	1968
3	Five City Center	200	13	2019
4	Moravian House I	188	15	1974
5	Packer Memorial Church	183 / 56		1885
6	Tower 6	180	12	2018
7 (tie)	Wind Creek Bethlehem	175	14	2011
7 (tie)	The Fred B. Rooney Building	175	14	1979
9 (tie)	First United Church of Christ	173 / 53		1776
9 (tie)	Regency Towers	173	14	1973
11	Two City Center	165	11	2014
12 (tie)	Towne House Apartments	161	13	1976
12 (tie)	Towers East	161	13	1967
14	Americus Center	150	13	1927
15	Bethlehem Steel Building	140	13	1916
16 (tie)	Lutheran Manor Apartments	138	11	1977
16 (tie)	One Bethlehem Plaza	138	11	1974
16 (tie)	Monocacy Tower	138	11	1973
19 (tie)	B'nai B'rith West Apartments	136	11	1979
19 (tie)	Little Lehigh Manor	136	11	1979
21	Walter House	134	11	1963
22	Allentown Center Square	130	11	1911
23 (tie)	Tower 65	125	10	1967
23 (tie)	Moravian House 2	125	10	1979
25 (tie)	Lehigh County Prison	124	10	1992
25 (tie)	Hamilton Financial Center	124	10	1983
27	Renaissance Allentown Hotel	123	10	2015
28	The Eastonian	121 / 37	10	1926
29	Alpha Building	115	10	1901
30	Tower Apartments	112.73	9	1966
31	Soldiers and Sailors Monument of Allentown	112 / 34		1899
32	Lehigh County Courthouse	111	9	1965
33	Hotel Bethlehem	104	11	1922
34 (tie)	The Andrew W. Litzenberger House	100	8	1967
34 (tie)	Lehigh Valley Hospital - Muhlenberg	100	8	2005
34 (tie)	No. 2 Machine Shop	100	8	1890
34 (tie)	Iacocca Hall at Lehigh University	100	8	1961
38	Lehigh Valley Hospital - 17th Street	79 / 24	6	1952
39	Allentown Masonic Temple	77 / 24	6	1925
40	Soldiers' & Sailors' Monument of Easton	75 / 23		1900

== See also ==
- Allentown, Pennsylvania
- Lehigh Valley
