= Pennsylvania Route 873 =

State highway in Pennsylvania, US

Pennsylvania Route 873

Route information
- Maintained by PennDOT
- Length: 8.860 mi (14.259 km)
- Existed: May 9, 1966–present

Major junctions
- South end: PA 309 in Schnecksville
- PA 329 in Neffs
- North end: PA 248 in Lehigh Township

Location
- Country: United States
- State: Pennsylvania
- Counties: Lehigh, Northampton

Highway system
- Pennsylvania State Route System; Interstate; US; State; Scenic; Legislative
| ← PA 872 | → PA 875 |

Pennsylvania Route 873 (PA 873) is a north-south, two-lane road in the Lehigh Valley region of Pennsylvania, mainly located in northern Lehigh County with a small section in Northampton County. Its southern terminus is at PA 309 in Schnecksville. Its northern terminus is at PA 248 in the Lehigh Township hamlet of Weiders Crossing. The route runs through rural areas in northern Lehigh County, intersecting the western terminus of PA 329 in Neffs. PA 873 passes through Slatington as Main Street before it crosses the Lehigh River into Northampton County and immediately reaches its northern terminus south of Lehigh Gap in Blue Mountain.

The road between Schnecksville and Lehigh Gap was originally designated part of Legislative Route 163 in 1911. This section of road became part of U.S. Route 309 (US 309) when the U.S. Highway System was established in 1926. In the late 1920s, PA 22 and PA 130 were briefly marked concurrent with US 309 at different times. In the 1950s, US 309 was moved to a new alignment to the west, and part of PA 29 was designated onto the road between Schnecksville and Lehigh Gap. PA 873 was designated onto this road on May 9, 1966 after PA 29 was split into two segments.

== Route description ==
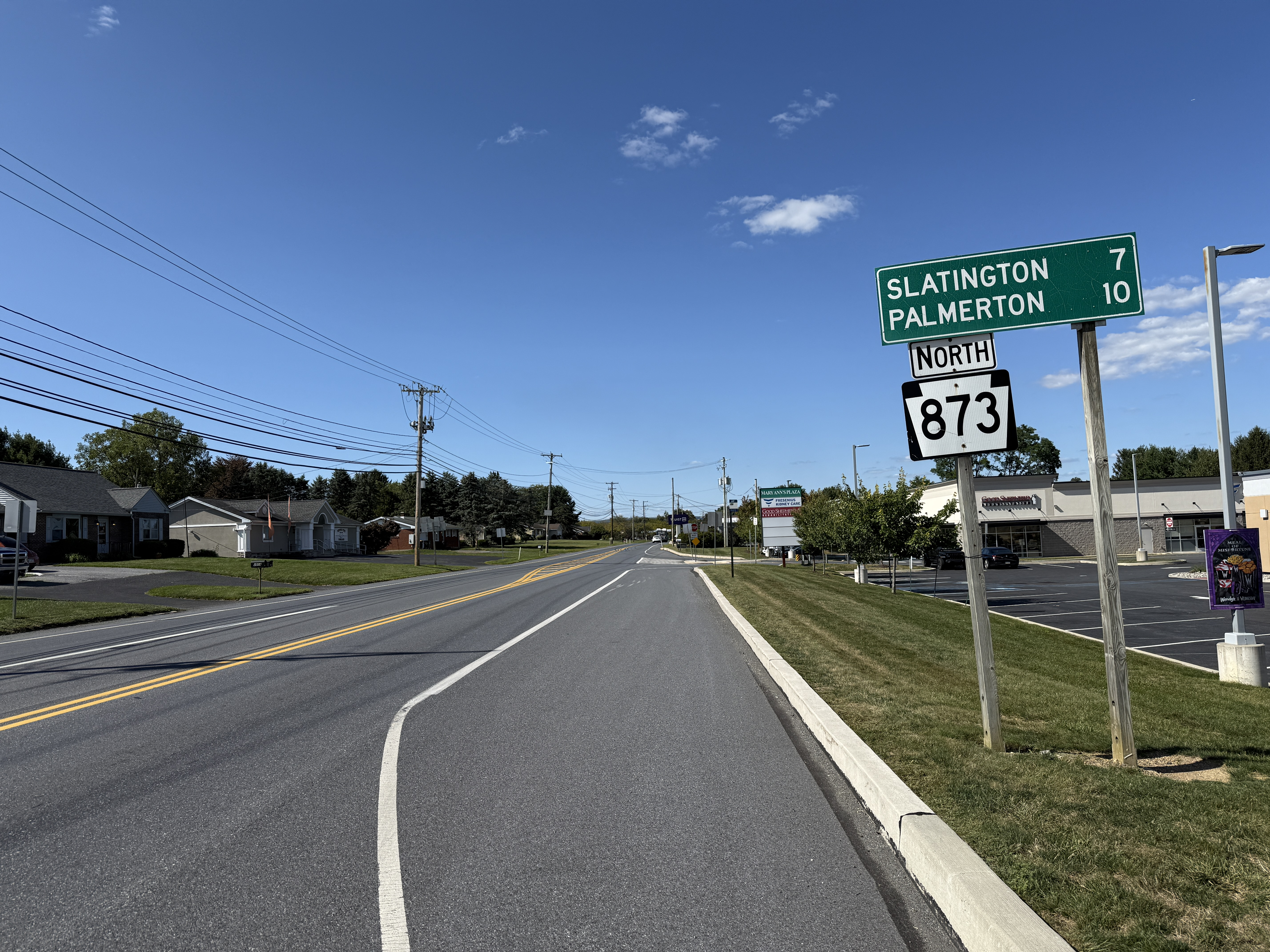
PA 873 northbound past its southern terminus at PA 309 in Schnecksville

PA 873 begins at an intersection with PA 309 in Schnecksville in North Whitehall Township, Lehigh County, which is in the Lehigh Valley.

From this intersection, the route heads north on a two-lane undivided road, passing a mix of homes and businesses. The road turns northeast and passes residences and fields before intersecting the western terminus of PA 329. From here, PA 873 continues north into Neffs prior to curving northwest and entering Washington Township. In this area, the road passes through a mix of housing developments and farmland as it turns north and passes over Interstate 476, also known as the Pennsylvania Turnpike Northeast Extension.

The route continues through rural areas of homes and woods prior to crossing into the borough of Slatington. In Slatington, PA 873 becomes Main Street and is lined with residences before reaching the commercial downtown, where the road makes a sharp turn to the east and crosses over the Slate Heritage Trail and Trout Creek. The route turns north onto Walnut Street and passes more businesses before running past a few homes a short distance to the west of Slatington Airport.

PA 873 leaves Slatington for Washington Township again and runs through wooded areas with some residences. The route turns northeast, with the Appalachian Trail joining the road, and crosses over the D&L Trail and the Lehigh River into Lehigh Township in Northampton County, where it passes over Norfolk Southern's Lehigh Line before ending at PA 248 at the base of Blue Mountain south of Lehigh Gap.

The Appalachian Trail turns south onto PA 248 at this point.

== History ==
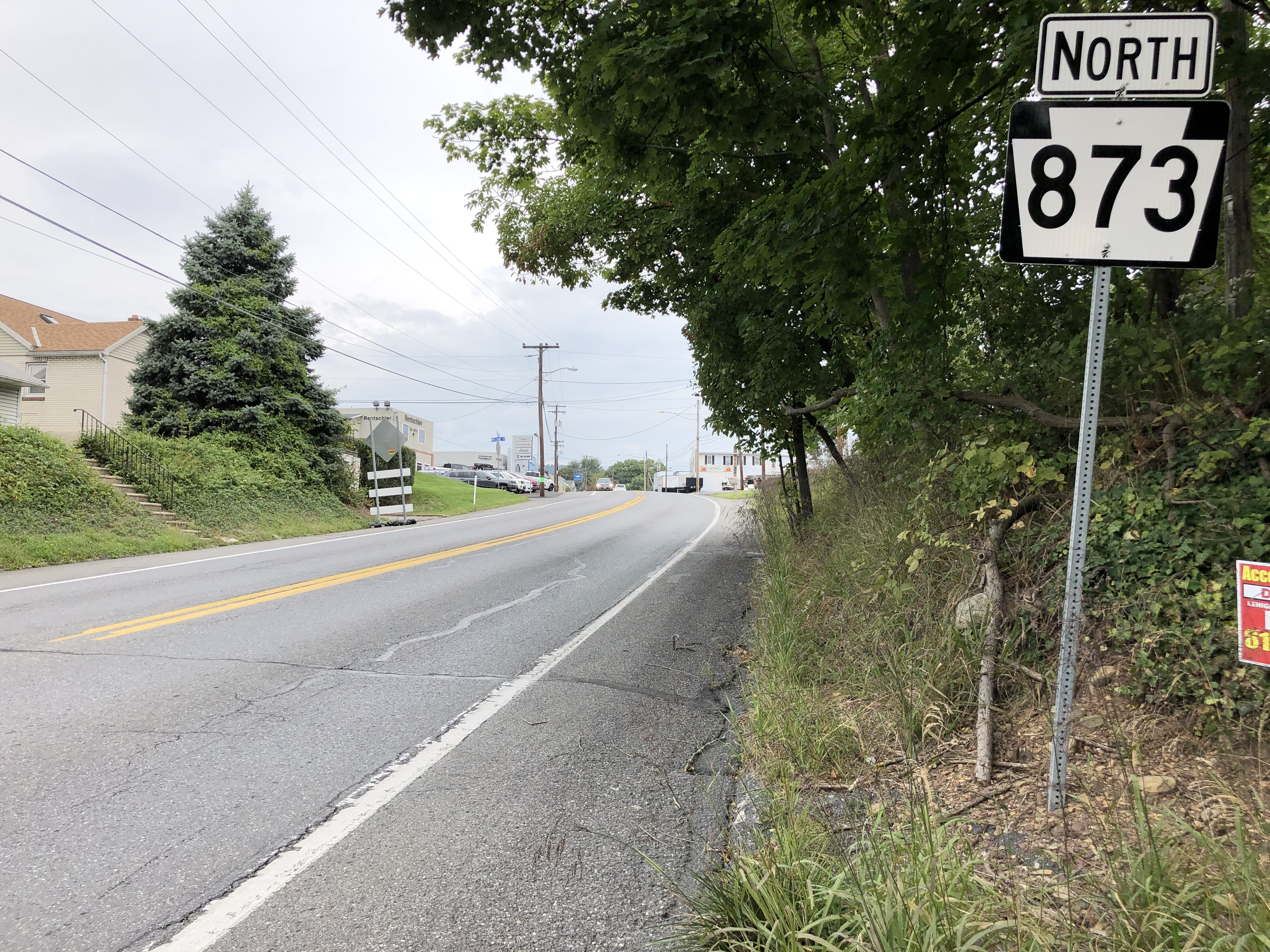
PA 873 northbound in Slatington

When Pennsylvania first legislated routes in 1911, what is now PA 873 was incorporated as part of Legislative Route 163, which ran between Allentown and Mauch Chunk in present-day Jim Thorpe.

With creation of the U.S. Highway System in 1926, the section of road between Schnecksville and Lehigh Gap was designated as part of US 309, a route that ran from Philadelphia north to Wilkes-Barre. At this time, the entire road was paved. PA 22 was designated concurrent with US 309 on this stretch of road in 1927.

The following year, in 1927, PA 130 replaced the PA 22 designation along US 309. By 1930, the concurrent PA 130 designation was removed along this stretch of US 309, which intersected PA 29 in Schnecksville and PA 45 in Lehigh Gap. US 309 was shifted west to a new alignment between Allentown and Hazleton in the 1950s, and PA 29 was shifted east to follow the road running between Schnecksville and Lehigh Gap.

On May 9, 1966, the PA 29 designation between Allentown and West Nanticoke was removed, splitting the route into two segments. As a result, PA 873 was designated onto the former alignment of PA 29 between US 309 (now PA 309) in Schnecksville and PA 248 (which replaced PA 45) in Lehigh Gap.

== Major intersections ==
| County | Location | mi | km | Destinations | Notes |
|---|---|---|---|---|---|
| Lehigh | North Whitehall Township | 0.000 | 0.000 | PA 309 – Allentown, Tamaqua, Hazleton | Southern terminus |
| Lehigh | North Whitehall Township | 1.334 | 2.147 | PA 329 east (Bellview Road) – Egypt | Western terminus of PA 329 |
| Northampton | Lehigh Township | 8.860 | 14.259 | PA 248 (Lehigh Drive) – Palmerton, Lehighton, Easton | Northern terminus |
1.000 mi = 1.609 km; 1.000 km = 0.621 mi
