= Cementon, Pennsylvania =

Unincorporated community in Pennsylvania, US

- Census-designated place
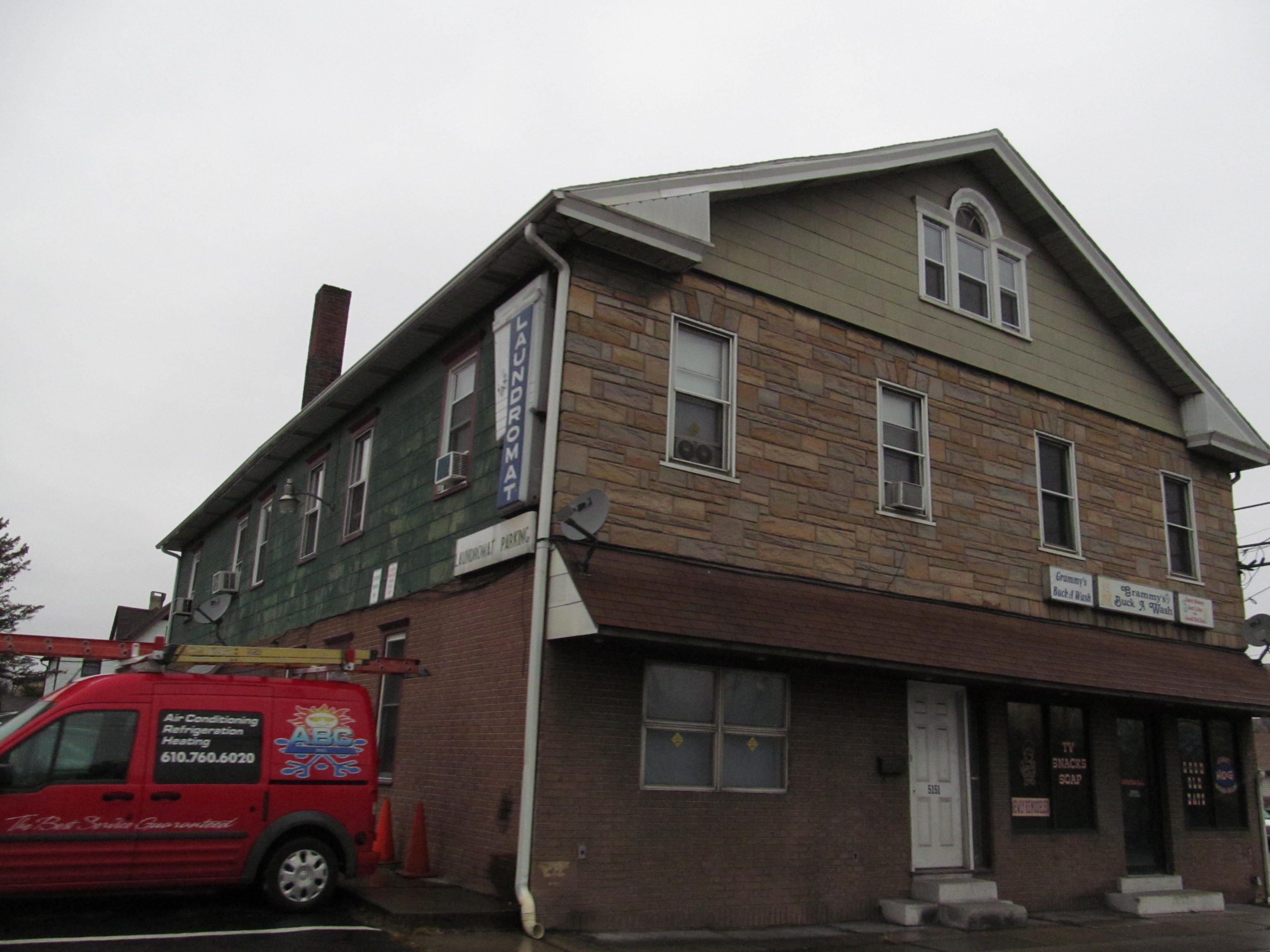
- Cementon in December 2012

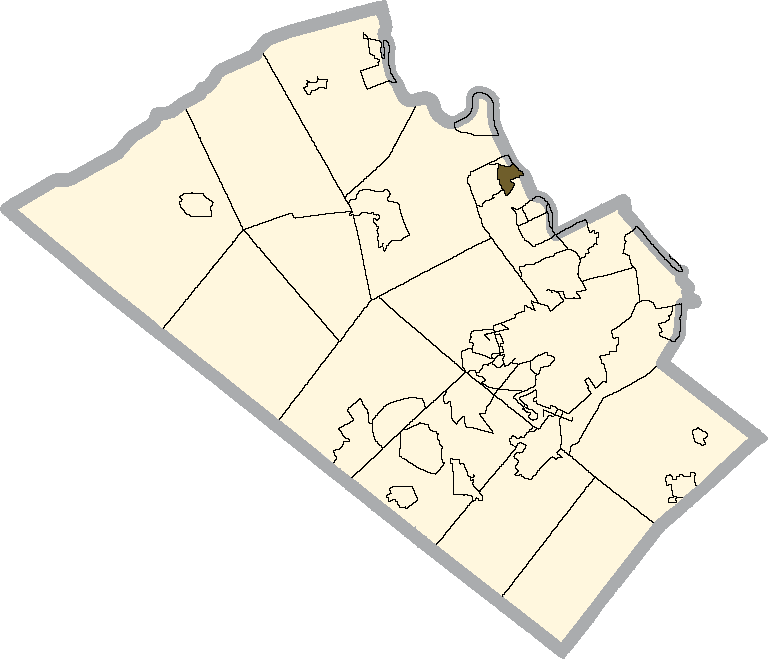
- Location of Cementon in Lehigh County, Pennsylvania

- Location in of Cementon in Pennsylvania Location in the United States
- Coordinates: 40°41′21″N 75°30′27″W
- Country: United States
- State: Pennsylvania
- County: Lehigh
- Township: Whitehall

Area
  - Census-designated place: 0.67 sq mi (1.74 km^{2})
  - Land: 0.65 sq mi (1.69 km^{2})
  - Water: 0.019 sq mi (0.05 km^{2})
- Elevation: 315 ft (96 m)

Population (2020)
  - Census-designated place: 1,657
  - Density: 2,546.8/sq mi (983.32/km^{2})
  - Metro: 865,310 (US: 68th)
- Time zone: UTC-5 (Eastern (EST))
  - Summer (DST): UTC-4 (EDT)
- ZIP Code: 18052
- Area codes: 610 and 484
- FIPS code: 42-11976
- GNIS feature ID: 1171410

Cementon is an unincorporated area and census-designated place (CDP) in Lehigh County, Pennsylvania. The town is in Whitehall Township, 7 miles (11 km) north of Allentown. As of the 2020 census, the population of Cementon was 1,657. Cementon is part of the Lehigh Valley metropolitan area, which had a population of 861,899 and was the 68th-most populous metropolitan area in the U.S. as of 2020. It uses the Whitehall Township ZIP Code of 18052.

== Geography ==
Cementon is in northeastern Lehigh County, Pennsylvania situated along the Lehigh River across from Northampton in Northampton County. It is bordered to the west by the unincorporated community of Egypt. Pennsylvania Route 329 passes through the center of Cementon, crossing the Lehigh east into Northampton and leading west through Egypt to Neffs. Pennsylvania Route 145 forms the western boundary of Cementon, crossing PA 329 in the Eagle Point neighborhood. PA 145 leads northwest 8 miles (13 km) to Walnutport and south to the center of Allentown.

According to the U.S. Census Bureau, Cementon has a total area of 0.66 square miles (1.7 km^{2}), of which 0.02 square miles (0.05 km^{2}), or 2.94%, are water. The town is part of the Delaware River watershed.

== History ==
Historical population
Census	Pop.	Note	%±
2000	1,319		—
2010	1,538		16.6%
2020	1,657		7.7%
U.S. Decennial Census

Cementon was originally known as "Siegfried's Ferry" as it is located directly across the Lehigh River from Siegfried, one of the three villages that would merge to become Northampton in 1902. In 1828, a bridge was built across the river, and the town became known as Siegfried's Bridge. After a large Whitehall Portland Cement Works quarry and mill were established in 1900–01, the town was renamed "Cementon".

== Education ==
Cementon is part of the Whitehall-Coplay School District. Students in grades nine through 12 attend Whitehall High School.
