= Egypt, Pennsylvania =

Unincorporated community in Pennsylvania, US

Egypt, Pennsylvania Iegypden
- Census-designated place
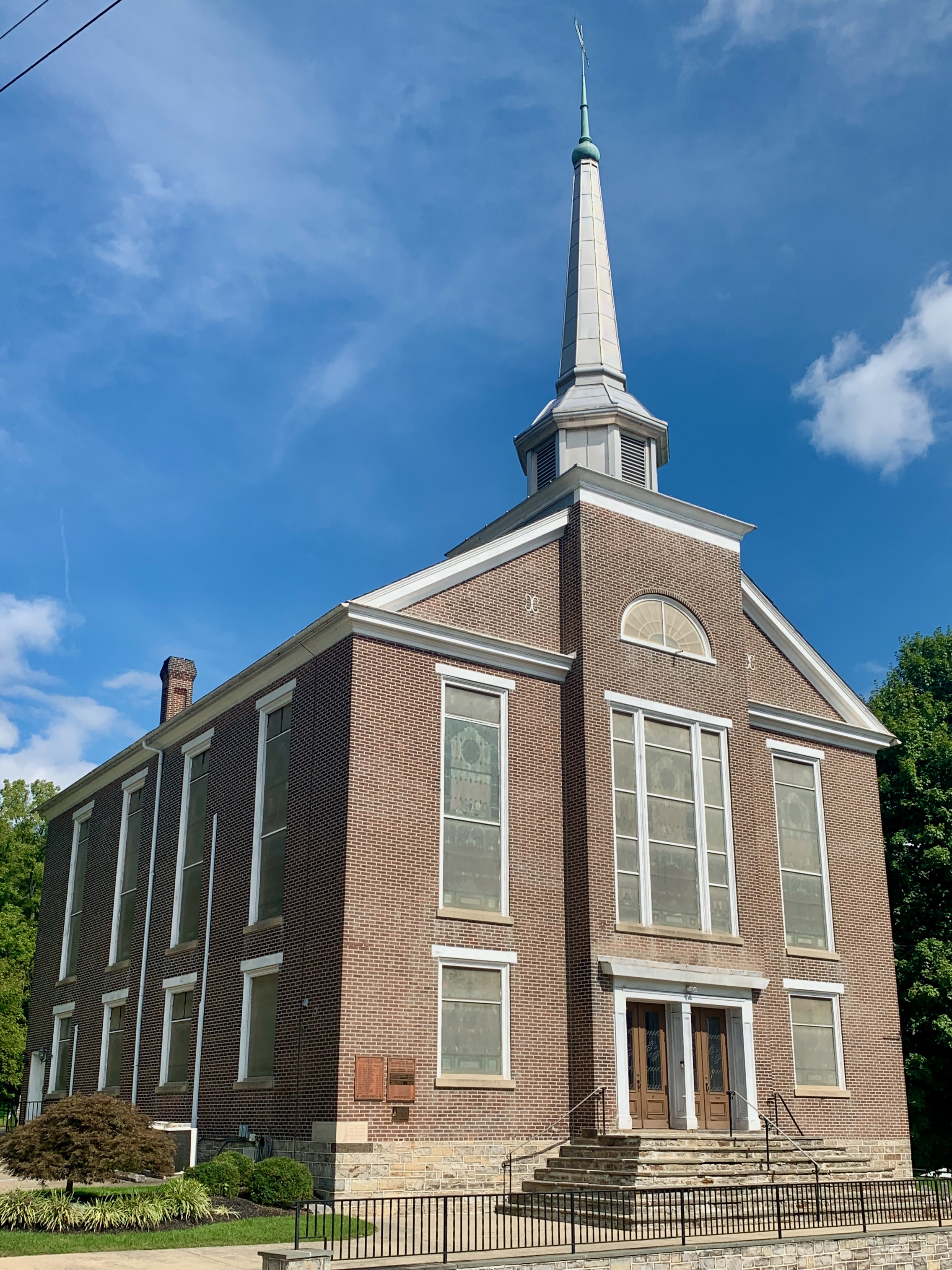
- Egypt Community Church in September 2020

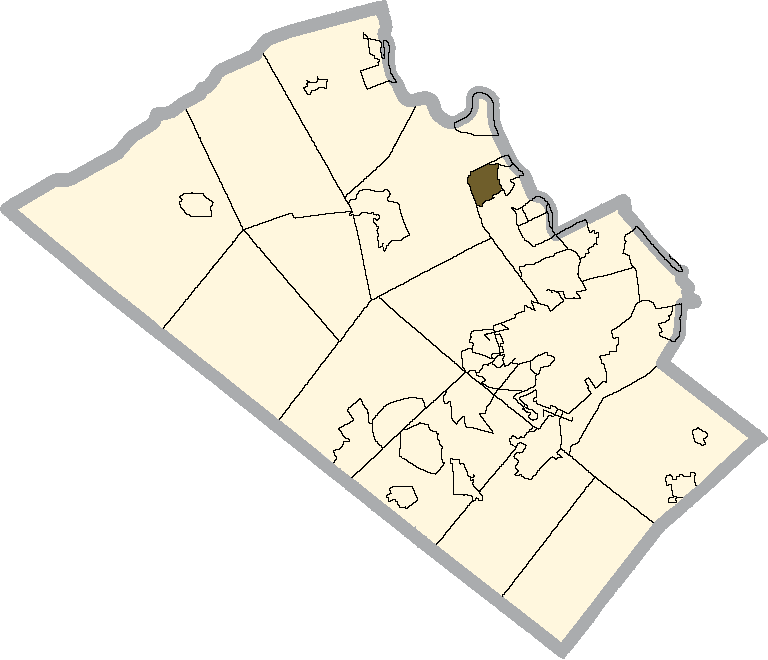
- Location of Egypt in Lehigh County, Pennsylvania

- Location of Egypt in Pennsylvania Location in the United States
- Coordinates: 40°40′48″N 75°31′48″W
- Country: United States
- State: Pennsylvania
- County: Lehigh
- Township: Whitehall Township

Area
  - Census-designated place: 1.47 sq mi (3.82 km^{2})
  - Land: 1.47 sq mi (3.81 km^{2})
  - Water: 0.0039 sq mi (0.01 km^{2})
- Elevation: 413 ft (126 m)

Population (2020)
  - Census-designated place: 2,588
  - Density: 1,759.0/sq mi (679.15/km^{2})
  - Metro: 865,310 (US: 68th)
- Time zone: UTC-5 (EST)
  - Summer (DST): UTC-4 (EDT)
- ZIP Code: 18052
- Area code: 610
- FIPS code: 42-22696
- GNIS feature ID: 1174043

Egypt (Pennsylvania German: Iegypden) is an unincorporated community and census-designated place (CDP) in Whitehall Township in Lehigh County, Pennsylvania, United States. The population of Egypt was 2,588 as of the 2020 census.

Egypt is located about 7 miles (11 km) north of Allentown and is part of the Lehigh Valley metropolitan area, which had a population of 861,899 and was the 68th-most populous metropolitan area in the U.S. as of the 2020 census.

== Geography ==
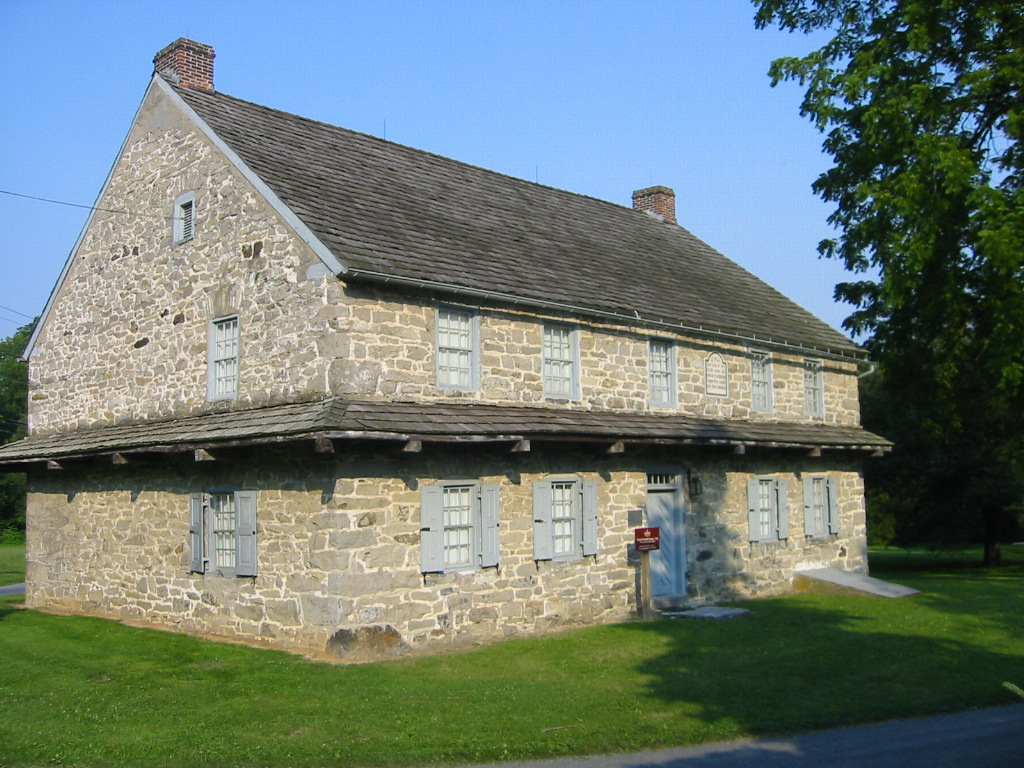
Built in 1756, Troxell-Steckel House in Egypt is among the oldest buildings in Lehigh County.

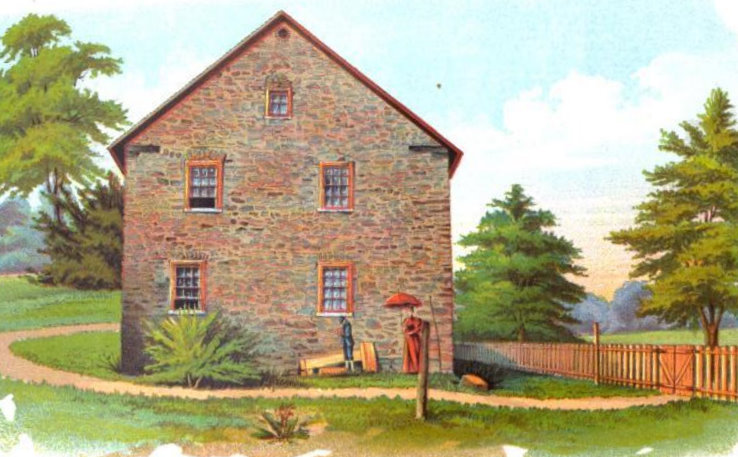
Located near Egypt, Fort Deshler, depicted in this 1895 engraving, was built in 1760 to protect settlers from Indian attacks during the French and Indian War.

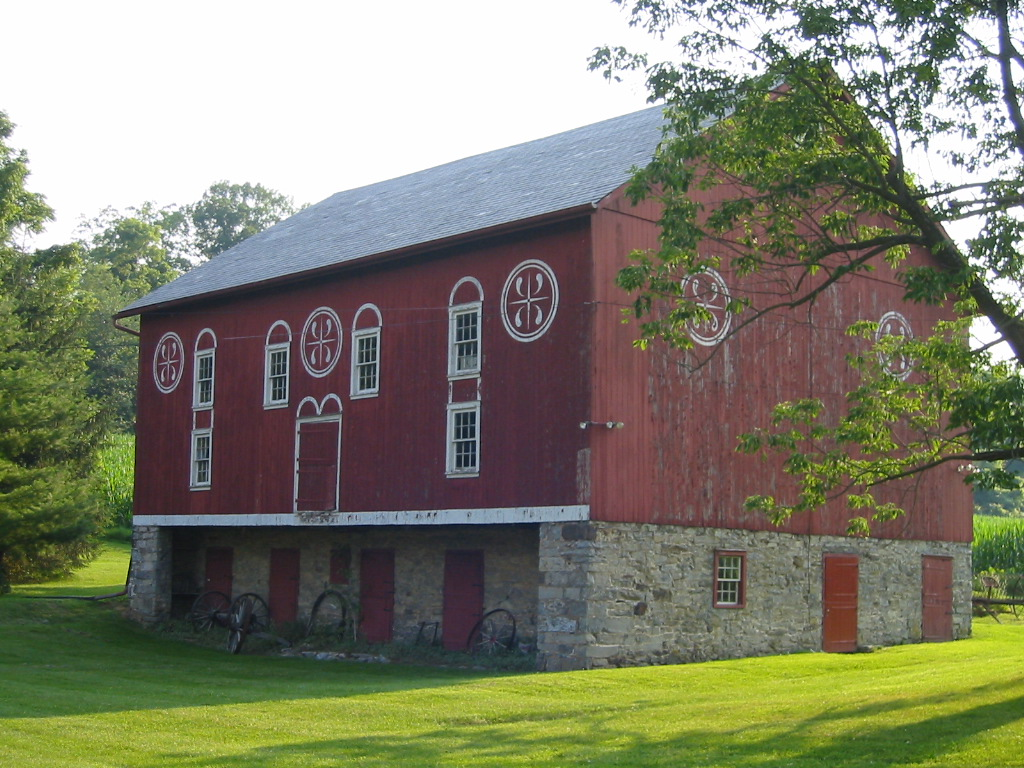
The barn at Troxell-Steckel House in Egypt, July 2008

Egypt is located in northeastern Lehigh County in the northwestern corner of Whitehall Township. It is bordered to the east by Cementon and to the north and west by North Whitehall Township. PA Route 329 is Egypt's Main Street and runs 1.5 miles (2.4 km) east into Cementon and 5 miles (8 km) west to Neffs. PA Route 329 intersects PA Route 145 on the eastern edge of Egypt, at the area known as Eagle Point. PA Route 145 leads north 8 miles (13 km) to Walnutport and south 6.5 miles (10.5 km) to Center City Allentown.

According to the U.S. Census Bureau, Egypt has a total area of 1.5 square miles (3.8 km^{2}), of which 2.4 acres (9,595 m^{2}), or 0.26%, are water. Coplay Creek, a tributary of the Lehigh River, flows eastward through the southern part of the community. Through the Lehigh River, the community is part of the Delaware River watershed.

== History ==
=== 18th century ===
Egypt is one of the oldest communities in the Lehigh Valley region of eastern Pennsylvania. It was settled as early as 1733. It was the first settlement in Pennsylvania north of South Mountain. Egypt is one several Lehigh Valley locations, including Bethlehem, Nazareth, Emmaus, and Allentown's Jordan Creek, whose name was inspired by locations referenced in the Bible.

Early Pennsylvania German settlers of nearby present-day Lynn and Albany townships had named the area where they settled Alle mängel ("all deficiencies") due to the poor quality of the soil on which they were trying to farm and raise crops. By contrast, the soil here was found to be quite fertile, and early settlers named this region "Egypta", since ancient Egypt, with its fertile Nile Delta, was the "granary of the world".

The Reformed Congregation of Egypt Church was established in 1734, and a log church was erected in 1764.

The cemetery of the Egypt church contains the graves of many of the region's earliest inhabitants, including 25 veterans of the American Revolutionary War, 15 veterans of the War of 1812, and nine veterans of the American Civil War. Across the street from the church stands Egypt's World War I monument, which honors the 76 men from Egypt who served during that war. Dedicated on June 10, 1923, the centerpiece of the monument is the pressed copper sculpture, Spirit of the American Doughboy, by E. M. Viquesney.

One of the first settlers, John Jacob Mickley (1697–1769), started farming here in 1745.

In 1755, Jacob Kohler established a gristmill, located along Coplay Creek just south of the church. The Troxell-Steckel House, which was built in Egypt in 1756, is one of the oldest buildings in Lehigh County and is today operated as a museum and historic site by the Lehigh County Historical Society. The Egypt area was also the location of Fort Deshler, a French and Indian War era frontier fort established in 1760 to protect settlers from Indian attacks. The fort, which was near the present intersection of PA Route 145 and Chestnut Street, stood until about 1940. The site is commemorated by a Pennsylvania Historical and Museum Commission marker. A granite marker, located just outside Egypt at Scheidy's Road and Spring Street in North Whitehall Township, commemorates the last Indian attack in Lehigh County, which occurred on October 8, 1763, when nine settlers were murdered.

The earliest hotel in the area was the Werley House, which operated from 1796 to 1815.

=== 19th century ===
The first "English school", as opposed to one that taught students in the Pennsylvania German dialect, was founded in 1808. Other early industries in the immediate area included a carriage works, coal yard, bakery, tannery and silk works.

Development of the community was spurred by the organization of the American Improved Cements Company (later American Cement Company), which took over and modernized the older Egypt Mills cement plant, located on the north side of Chestnut Street. In 1884, the company shipped its first load of cement to market using the Ironton Railroad. In 1896, American Cement ran power lines to supply the village of Egypt with electricity from its own power plants.

=== 20th century ===
American Cement, which subsequently opened a number of mills in the Egypt area, operated until 1913, when it was purchased by Giant Portland Cement. In addition to the Egypt Mills plant, Giant Portland operated six other cement mills in Egypt (Pennsylvania, Columbia, Giant #1 & #2, Central, and Reliance), and had an annual production capacity of 2.1 million barrels of cement. Parts of the New York City Subway were built using cement manufactured in Egypt's mills. Giant Portland ceased production around 1929, and mills were either closed or sold to other companies operating in the area. Today, cement production remains an important part of the local economy, and plants in the area are operated by Nazareth-based ESSROC, a subsidiary of the Italian firm Italcementi, and the French company Lafarge.

On June 2, 1947, the Philadelphia Phillies came to the Egypt Park to play an Egypt area high school team of the old Twilight League. The Phillies came to entice Curt Simmons, then a 17-year-old Whitehall High School pitcher from Main Street in Egypt, to play for them. Simmons took the Phillies to the wire, and the Phillies came back and tied the Egypt team 4-4 on account of darkness.

Historical population
Census	Pop.	Note	%±
2000	2,291		—
2010	2,391		4.4%
2020	2,588		8.2%

== Notable people ==
- Althea Henley, former actress
- Dan Koppen, former professional football player, Denver Broncos and New England Patriots
- Curt Simmons, former professional baseball player, California Angels, Chicago Cubs, Philadelphia Phillies, and St. Louis Cardinals

== Education ==
Egypt is part of the Whitehall-Coplay School District. Students in grades Kindergarten and first attend Clarence M. Gockley Elementary School, second through fourth grade attend George D. Steckel Elementary School and fifth through eighth grade attend Whitehall-Copley Middle School. Whitehall High School is attended by freshman through seniors. Whitehall High School.
