= Troxell-Steckel House =

Historic house in Pennsylvania, United States

- U.S. National Register of Historic Places
- Pennsylvania state historical marker
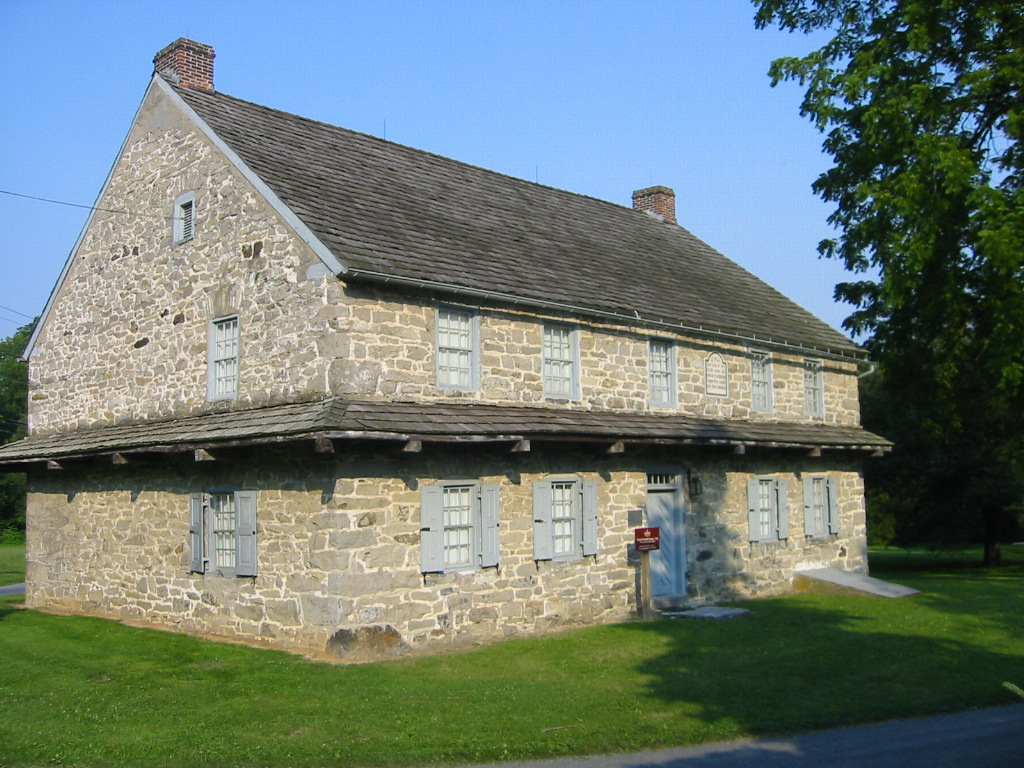
- Troxell-Steckel House in Egypt, Pennsylvania in July 2008

- Location within Pennsylvania Location within the United States
- Location: 4229 Reliance St., Egypt, Pennsylvania, U.S.
- Coordinates: 40°40′32″N 75°32′8″W
- Area: 1.2 acres (0.49 ha)
- Built: 1756
- Built by: Peter Troxell
- Architectural style: Colonial and Pennsylvania German
- NRHP reference No.: 80003557

Significant dates
- Added to NRHP: June 27, 1980
- Designated PHMC: November 2, 1970

The Troxell-Steckel House is an historic home that is located in Egypt, Pennsylvania in the Lehigh Valley region of eastern Pennsylvania, United States.

It was added to the National Register of Historic Places in 1980.

== History and architectural features ==
Built in 1756 by Johannes Peter Troxell (1719-1799), the historic structure is a 2 1/2-story, fieldstone dwelling with a high-pitched gable roof. Designed in the Pennsylvania-German style, it measures 48 feet (14.6 m) long and 35 feet (10.6 m) wide. Also located on the property are a contributing stone spring house and late-nineteenth century barn. The house and property were given to the Lehigh County Historical Society in 1942, and are now open as a historic house museum.
