= Balliettsville, Pennsylvania =

Unincorporated community in Pennsylvania, US

- Unincorporated community
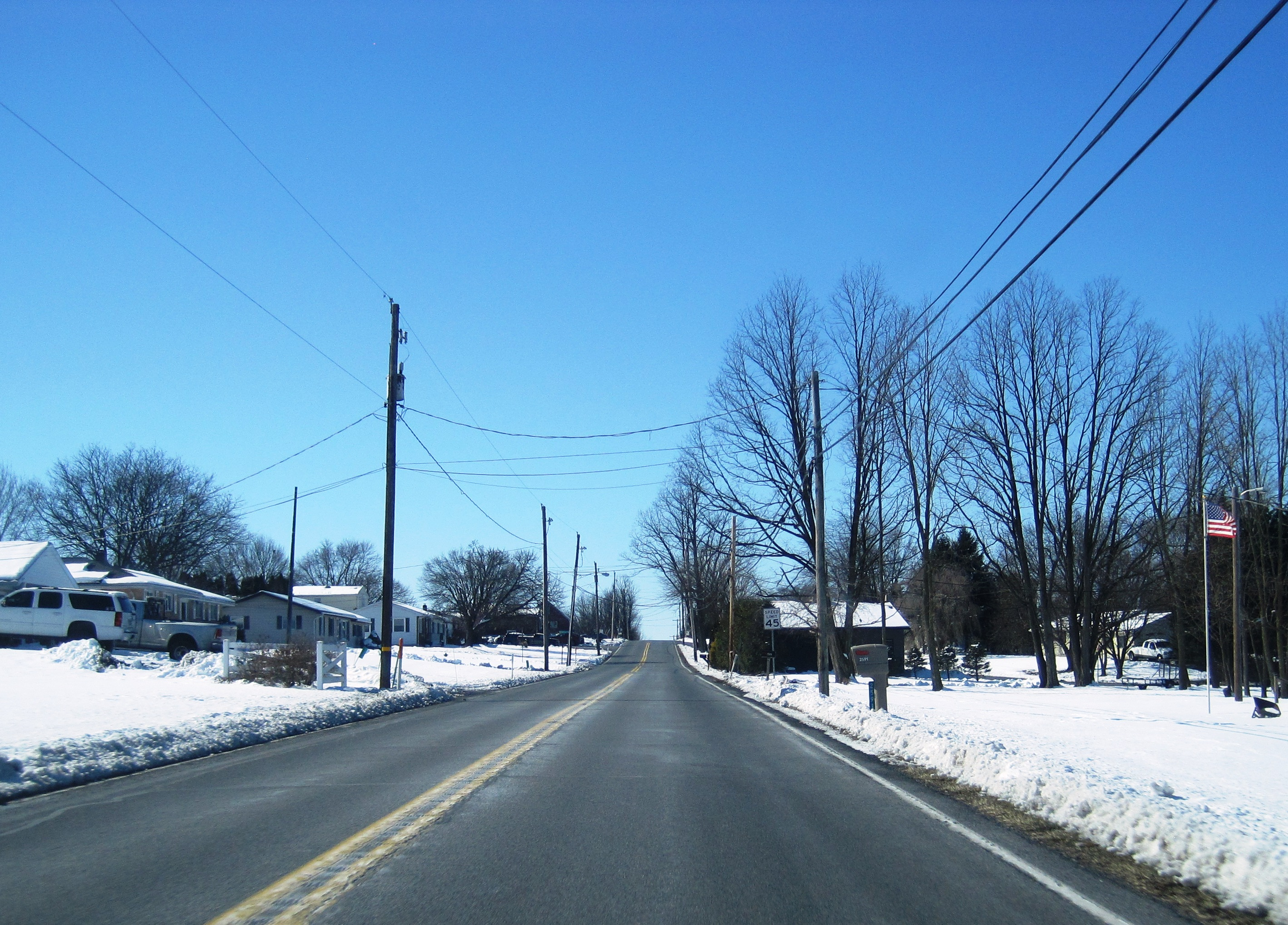
- Westbound PA 329 through the village

- Location within Pennsylvania
- Coordinates: 40°40′42″N 75°34′26″W
- Country: United States
- State: Pennsylvania
- County: Lehigh
- Township: North Whitehall
- Elevation: 551 ft (168 m)

Population
  - Metro: 865,310 (US: 68th)
- Time zone: UTC-5 (Eastern (EST))
  - Summer (DST): UTC-4 (EDT)
- ZIP code: 18037
- Area codes: 610 and 484
- GNIS feature ID: 1168670

Balliettsville (also spelled Ballietsville) is an unincorporated community in North Whitehall Township in Lehigh County, Pennsylvania. It is part of the Lehigh Valley, which had a population of 861,899 and was the 68th-most populous metropolitan area in the U.S. as of the 2020 census.

Balliettsville is located at the intersection of Pennsylvania Route 329 and Mauch Chunk Road, eight miles north of Allentown and six miles west of Northampton. The estimated population is around 1,000 people. The village is served by the Parkland School District.

== History ==
Balliettsville is the oldest village in North Whitehall Township. The town is named for Paulus Balliet, who owned the land the village now comprises.
