= Lehigh County Historical Society =

Lehigh County Historical Society Headquarters
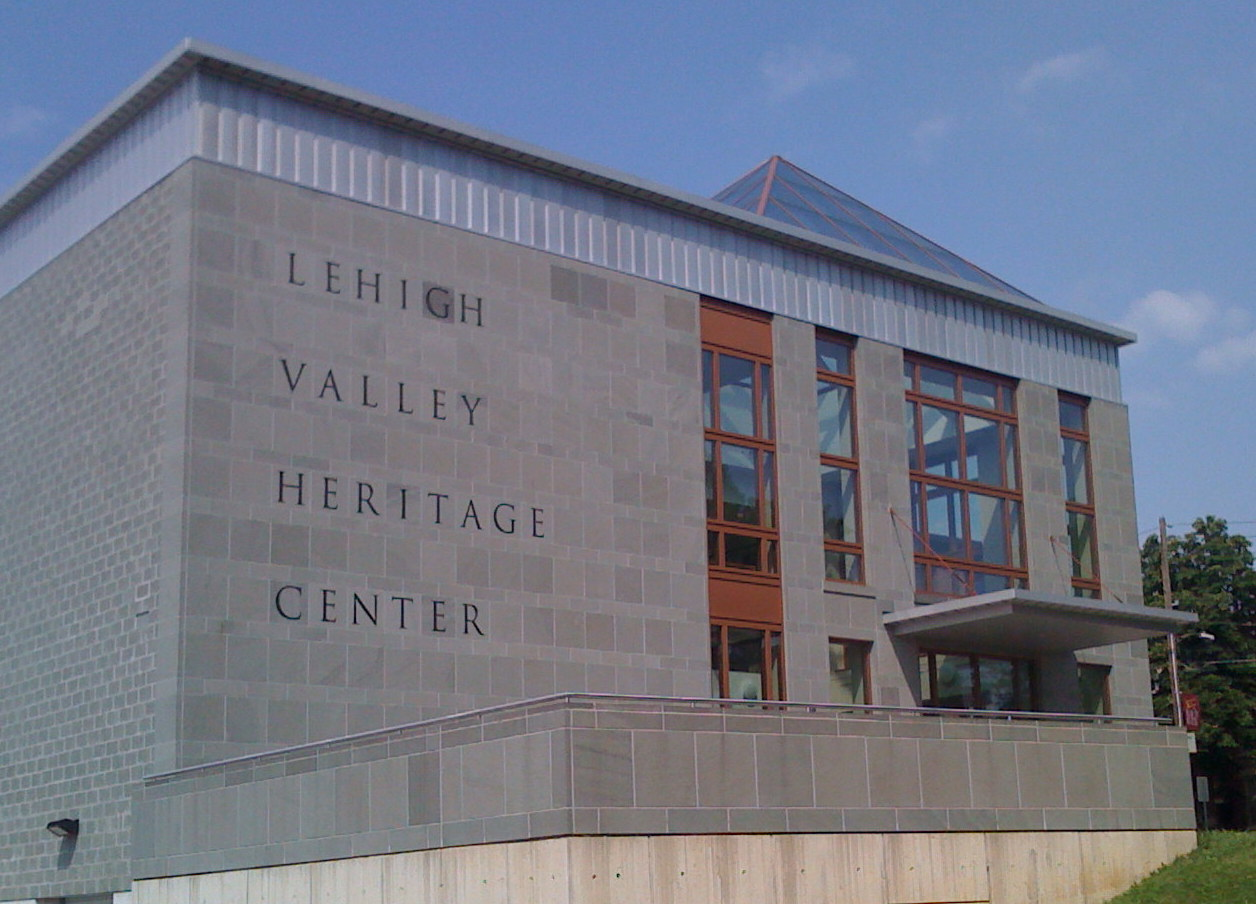
- Lehigh County Historical Society in June 2008
- Established: 1904
- Location: 432 West Walnut Street, Allentown, Pennsylvania, U.S.
- Coordinates: 40.60219°N 75.46592°W
- Type: Historical museum
- Directors: Joseph Garrera, M.A.
- Curators: Jill Youngken, M.A.
- Public transit access: LANta bus: 102, 107, 210, 220, 324 (at 5th and Hamilton/Linden streets)
- Website: https://www.lehighvalleyheritagemuseum.org

Lehigh County Historical Society is a nonprofit organization in the United States, founded in 1904, dedicated to collecting, preserving, and exhibiting the history of Lehigh County, Pennsylvania and the Lehigh Valley region of eastern Pennsylvania. The Historical Society and Lehigh Valley Heritage Museum are located at 432 West Walnut Street in Allentown.

It has EIN 23-6394211 as a 501(c)(3) Public Charity; in 2024 it claimed $1,298,653 in total revenue and $8,860,017 in total assets.

== Features ==
=== Lehigh Valley Heritage Museum ===
The Lehigh County Historical Society is headquartered in the Lehigh Valley Heritage Museum, a 30,000-square-foot (2,800 m^{2}) museum facility with four galleries and more than 10,000 square feet (930 m^{2}) of exhibition space. Recent exhibits have included exhibits on General Harry Clay Trexler, Native Americans, and U.S. presidents. The museum maintains an exhibit on the Lehigh Valley and an extensive collection of local and regional historical materials with more than 30,000 historical artifacts in its collection.

=== Library and archive ===
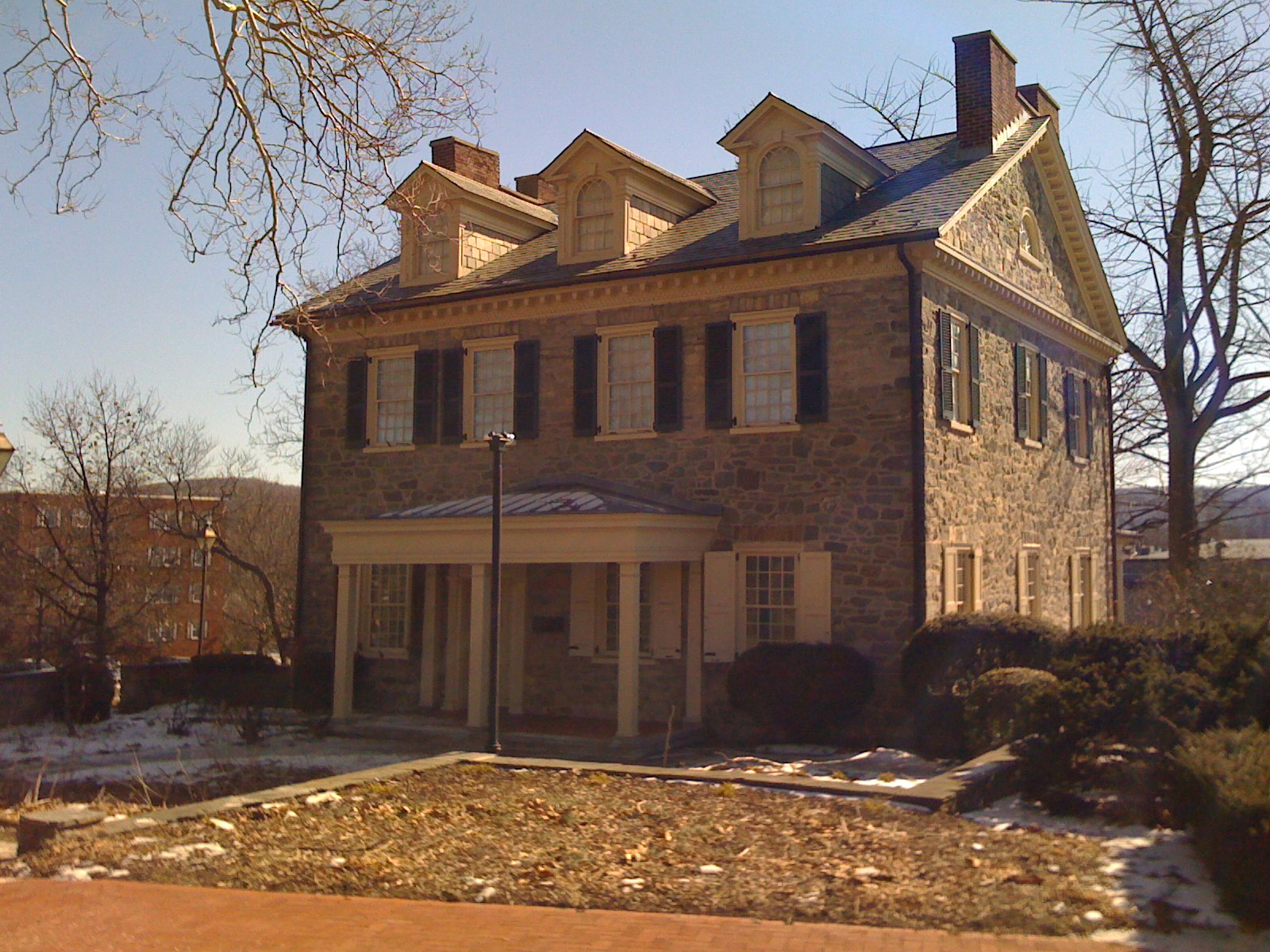
Now one of the sites administered by the Lehigh County Historical Society, Trout Hall served as the organization's home for many years.

The Lehigh County Historical Society's library, the Scott Andrew Trexler II Research Library and Archive, houses 200,000 vintage photographs and nearly three million historical documents. Included in its collections are more than 800 volumes of church and cemetery records for Lehigh and neighboring counties, early county records including tax rolls, wills and land deeds, indexed marriage records and announcements, 800 volumes of family genealogical histories, city directories from 1860 through the present, maps, census records, and published histories. The library also maintains microfiche versions of several of Allentown's early German and English-language newspapers. Access to the library is free for Society members; a small fee applies for non-members.

=== Historic sites ===
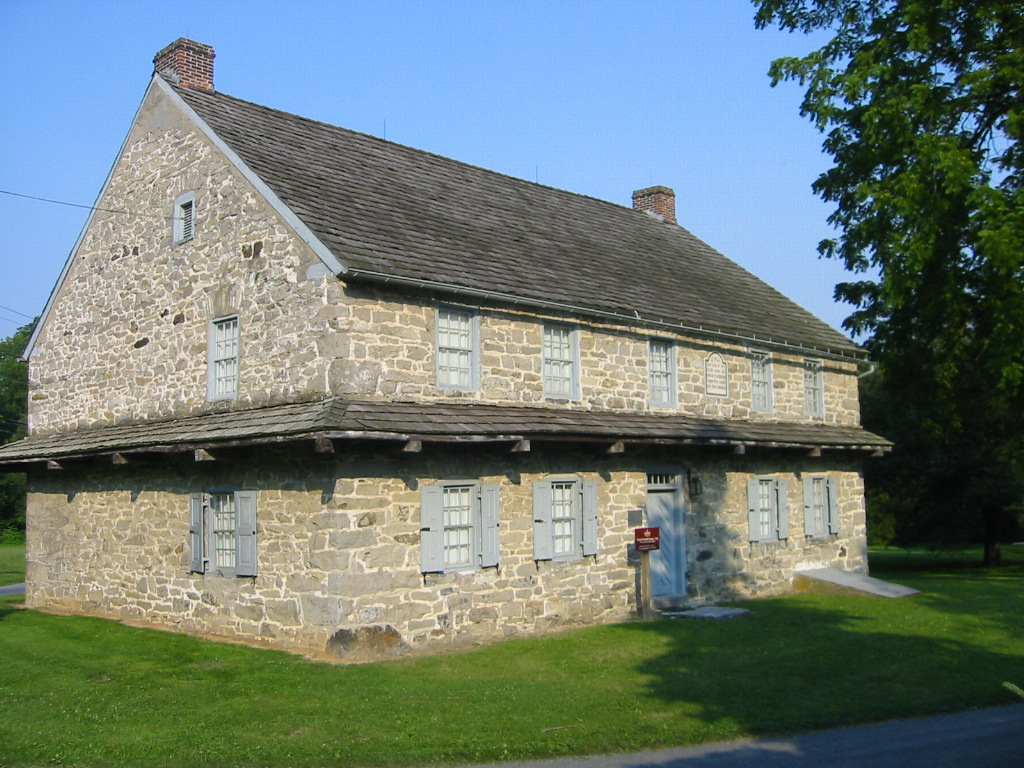
Built in 1756, the Troxell-Steckel House, administered by the Lehigh County Historical Society and open to the public, is one of the oldest buildings in Lehigh County.

The Lehigh County Historical Society administers six historical sites in the region:

- Claussville One-Room Schoolhouse (1893), a brick one-room school, the last one-room school in Lehigh County. 2917 Route 100, north of Fogelsville
- Haines Mill Museum (ca. 1850, rebuilt 1909), a working grist mill. 3600 Dorney Park Road, Cetronia, South Whitehall Township
- Lockridge Furnace Museum (1868), a 19th-century ironworks, now a museum and park dedicated to the anthracite iron industry. 525 Franklin Street, Alburtis
- Saylor Cement Industry Museum (1893), Cement kilns built by David O. Saylor, father of the American Portland cement industry. North Second Street, Coplay
- Trout Hall (1770), A colonial stone mansion and the home of James Allen, son of Allentown's founder, William Allen. 4th and Walnut Streets, Allentown
- Troxell-Steckel Farm Museum (1756), Pennsylvania Dutch stone farmhouse, one of Lehigh County's oldest structures. 4229 Reliance Street, off Route 329, in Egypt, Whitehall Township

== Publications ==
Proceedings, a bi-annual publication of the Lehigh County Historical Society

Proceedings, the journal of the Lehigh County Historical Society, was published on a bi-annual basis since 1906 and featured articles focusing on local and regional history. From 1947 to 1994, the publication was bound in a distinctive blue buckram hardcover binding with gilt lettering. In 1994, the journal was published in softcover. Publication of Proceedings was discontinued in 2004.

== See also ==
- Allentown, Pennsylvania
- Lehigh County, Pennsylvania
- List of historical societies
- List of historic places in Allentown, Pennsylvania
- List of historical societies in Pennsylvania
- Mahlon Hellerich
