= Pennsylvania Route 329 =

State highway in Pennsylvania, US

Pennsylvania Route 329

Route information
- Maintained by PennDOT
- Length: 12.881 mi (20.730 km)
- Existed: 1928–present

Major junctions
- West end: PA 873 in Neffs
- PA 145 in Egypt; PA 987 in East Allen Township
- East end: PA 248 / PA 987 in Bath

Location
- Country: United States
- State: Pennsylvania
- Counties: Lehigh, Northampton

Highway system
- Pennsylvania State Route System; Interstate; US; State; Scenic; Legislative
← PA 328	→ PA 331

Pennsylvania Route 329 (PA 329) is a Pennsylvania state highway that runs for 12.9 miles (20.8 km) through Lehigh and Northampton counties in the Lehigh Valley region of the state. It runs from PA 873 in the North Whitehall Township village of Neffs east to PA 248 and PA 987 in Bath. The route is a two-lane undivided road that runs through a mix of rural and developed areas to the north of the cities of Allentown and Bethlehem, serving the communities of Balliettsville, Egypt, Cementon, and Northampton. PA 329 intersects PA 145 near Egypt and runs concurrent with PA 987 between East Allen Township and the eastern terminus in Bath.

PA 329 was originally designated in 1928 to run from Egypt south to U.S. Route 22 (US 22), US 309, PA 29, and PA 43 in Center City Allentown. The alignment between Cementon and Bath was designated as part of PA 145 in 1928. By 1940, the route was realigned to a new alignment in Whitehall Township.

In 1941, PA 145 and PA 329 switched alignments, with PA 329 heading east to PA 45 (now PA 248) and PA 987 in Bath and PA 145 heading south to US 22, US 309, and PA 29 in Allentown. PA 329 was extended west to US 309 (now PA 873) in Neffs and a branch of the route was designated between Balliettsville and US 309/PA 29 and US 309 Byp. at the northern edge of Allentown. The section of PA 329 between Balliettsville and Allentown was decommissioned by 1950.

== Route description ==
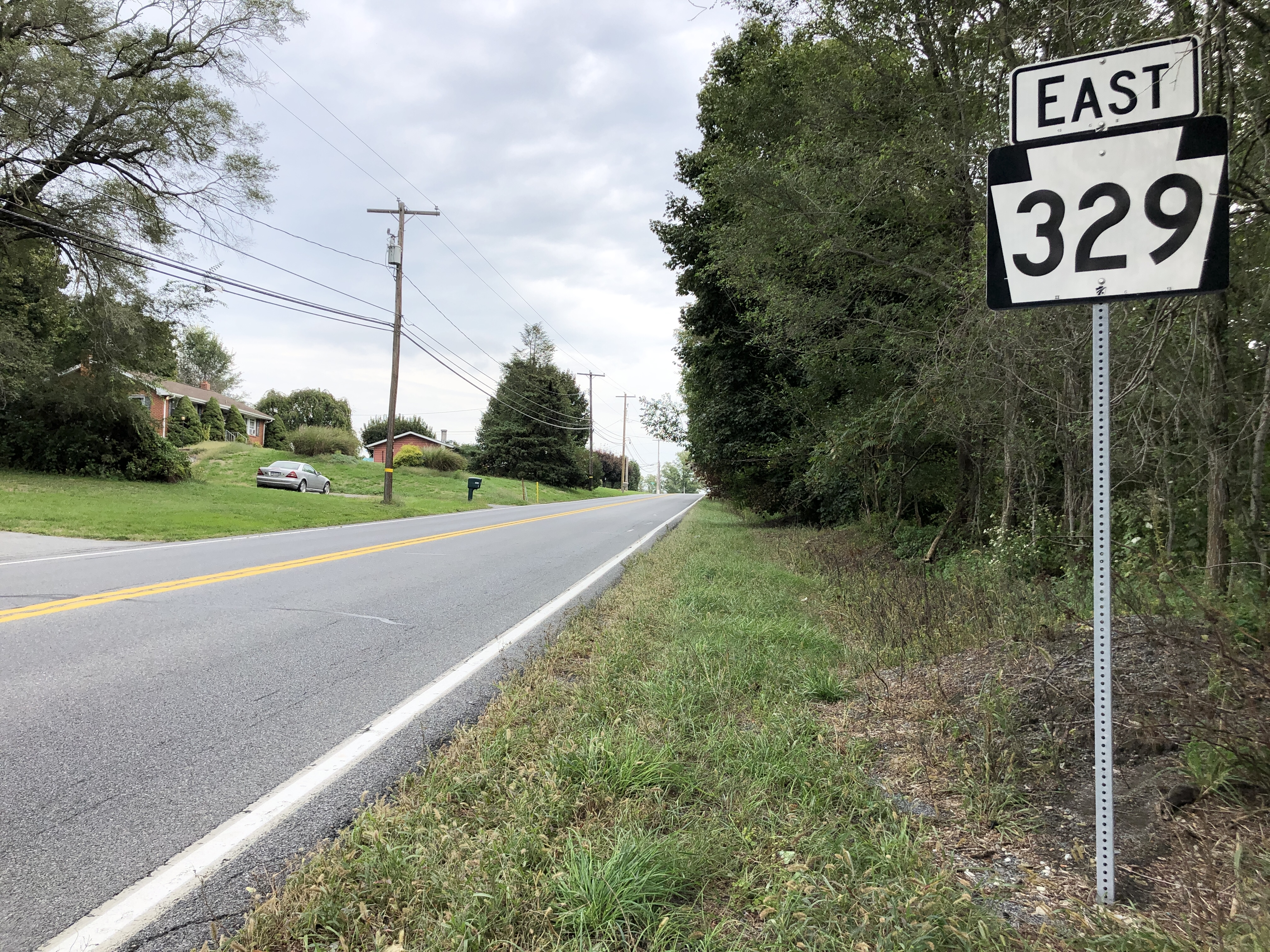
PA 329 eastbound in North Whitehall Township

PA 329 begins at an intersection with PA 873 in Neffs in North Whitehall Township, Lehigh County, which is in the Lehigh Valley. From this intersection, the route heads southeast on two-lane undivided Bellview Road past housing developments, soon passing under Interstate 476 (Pennsylvania Turnpike Northeast Extension) and crossing Coplay Creek.

After this, the road curves east into agricultural areas with a few homes, with PA 329 making a turn southeast onto Old Post Road. The route makes a curve to the east again as it continues through more farmland with scattered residential subdivisions, passing through Balliettsville. Upon entering Whitehall Township, the road becomes Main Street and passes through Egypt and continues past more homes and reaching the PA 145 junction.

From this point, PA 329 continues northeast through residential areas and passes through Cementon.

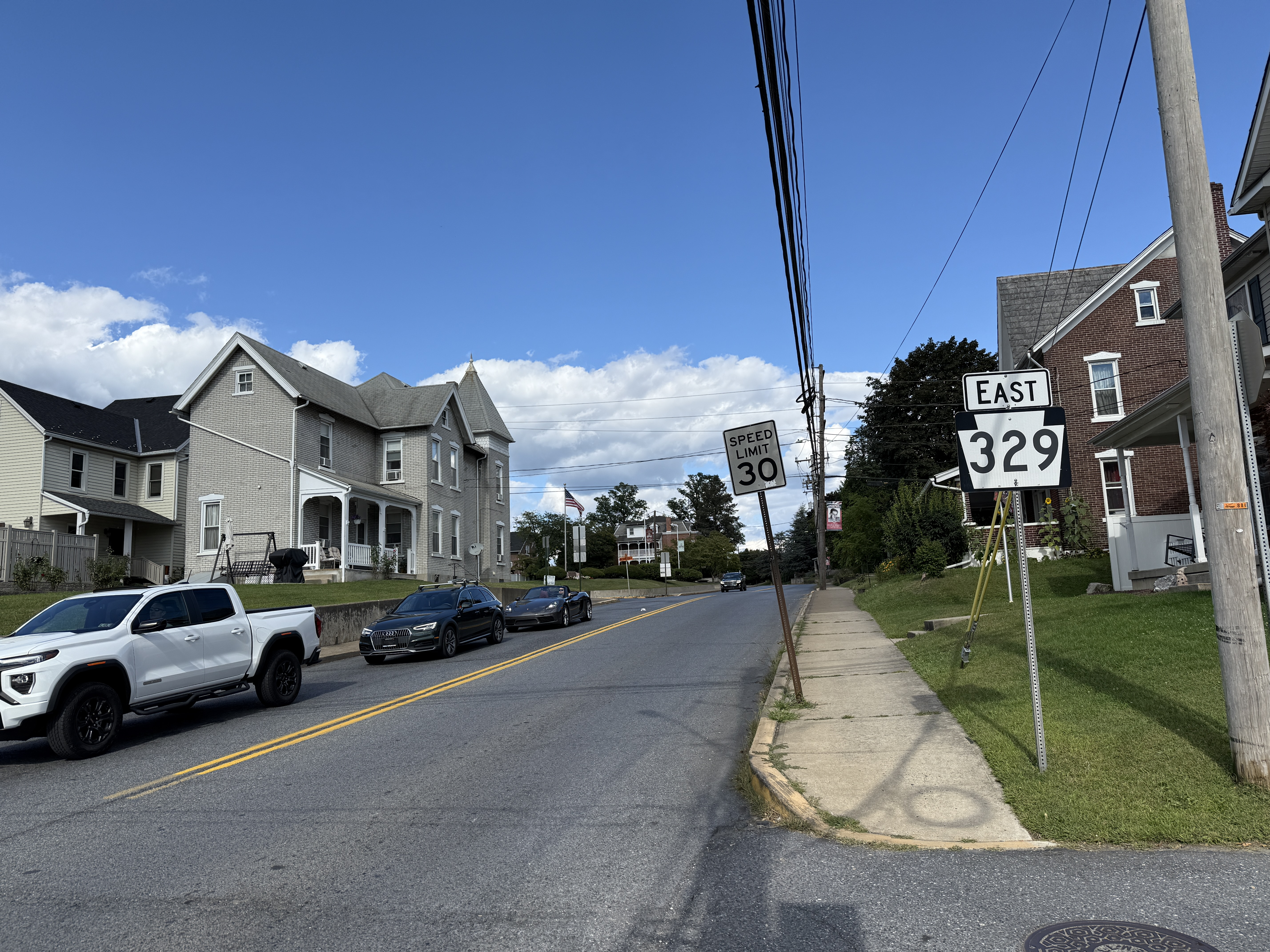
PA 329 eastbound in Northampton

After crossing the Lehigh River and the D&L Trail on the Cementon Bridge, PA 329 enters the borough of Northampton in Northampton County and becomes 21st Street, crossing Norfolk Southern's Lehigh Line at-grade as it heads into commercial areas. After crossing Main Street, the route is lined with homes before it crosses the Hokendauqua Creek into Allen Township and continues east. At this point, the name of the road becomes Nor-Bath Boulevard and it passes between a quarry and a lake to the north and industrial areas to the south before entering farmland. PA 329 briefly passes homes after the Howertown Road junction in Howertown, crossing into East Allen Township at the Seemsville Road intersection and heading across Catasauqua Creek.

The route continues through agricultural areas with some housing before reaching the PA 987 junction in Franks Corner. At this point, PA 987 forms a concurrency with PA 329, with the two routes continuing east through Jacksonville before turning northeast and passing to the east of a quarry, with the Nor-Bath Trail parallel to the east of the road. The road passes near a cement plant before it heads into the borough of Bath. The road then becomes Race Street and passes through woods before heading into residential areas. PA 329 reaches its eastern terminus at the PA 248 intersection, where PA 987 makes a turn east to follow PA 248.

== History ==
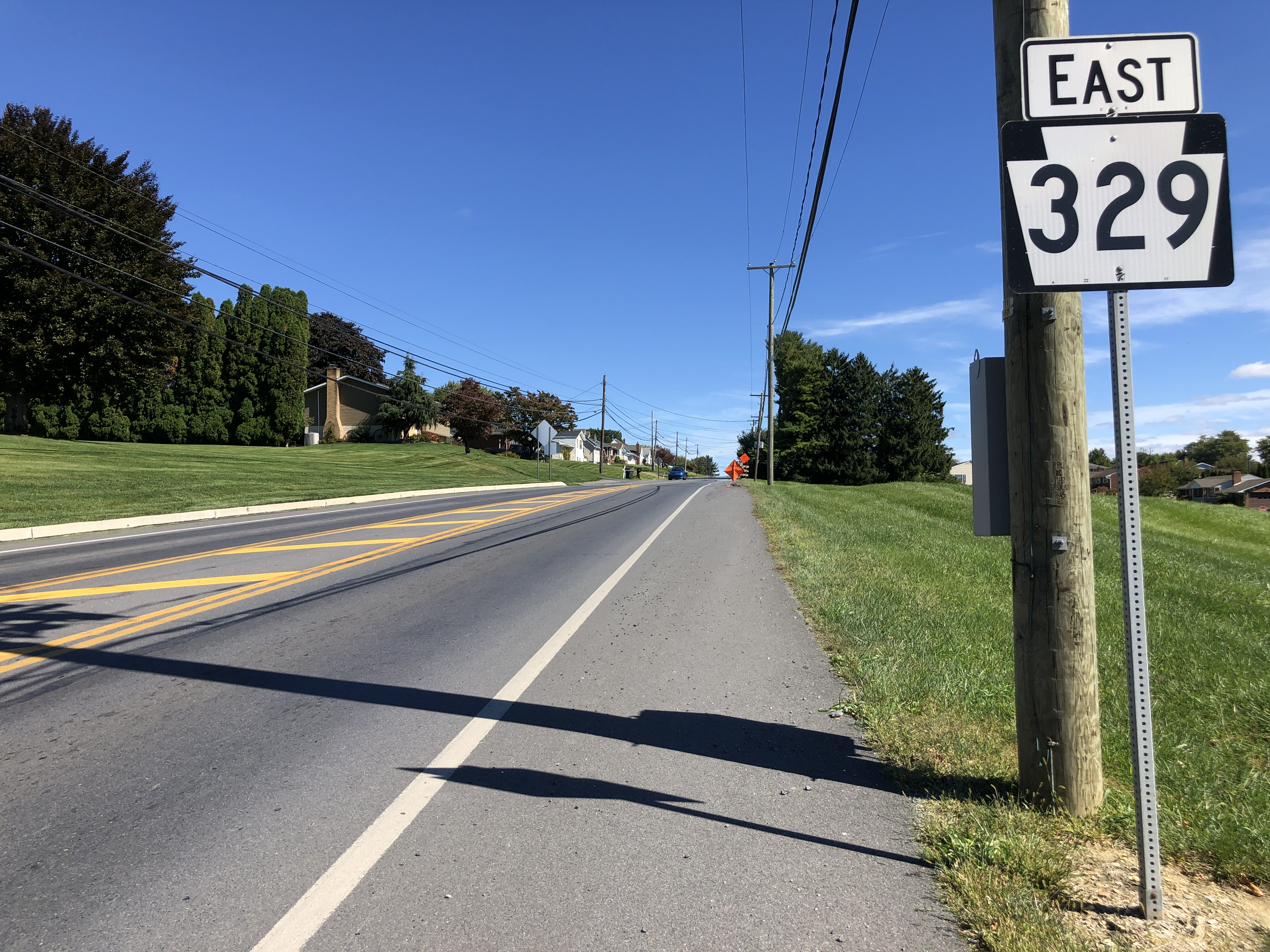
PA 329 eastbound in Allen Township

When Pennsylvania first legislated routes in 1911, what is now PA 329 was legislated as part of Legislative Route 175 from east of Northampton to Bath. By 1926, the roadway between Northampton and Bath was paved. The present route between Cementon and Bath was designated as the eastern part of PA 145 in 1928.

PA 329 was designated in 1928 to run from Egypt south to US 22, US 309, PA 29, and PA 43 at 7th and Hamilton streets in Allentown. The route followed its current alignment east to Cementon, where it headed south on Coplay Road to Coplay and then continued along Mickley Pike through Whitehall Township before entering Allentown on 7th Street.

In the 1930s, PA 329 was realigned to follow Seventh Street Pike (now MacArthur Road) through Whitehall Township. The Seventh Street Pike was built starting in the later part of the 1920s to provide a straight north-south road in Whitehall Township. The road between Allentown and Mickleys church was widened to three lanes in the 1930s. Also, the southern terminus was cut back to US 22, US 309, and PA 29 at Tilghman Street in Allentown in the 1930s, with US 309/PA 29 replacing the route along 7th Street between Tilghman and Hamilton streets. In 1941, PA 329 was realigned to follow its current alignment between US 309 (now PA 873) in Neffs and PA 45 (now PA 248) and PA 987 in Bath, replacing the PA 145 designation between Cementon and Bath.

PA 145 was realigned to follow the former alignment of PA 329 along Seventh Street Pike and 7th Street into Allentown. Another alignment designated PA 329 branched from the route in Balliettsville and headed southeast along Mauch Chunk Road and 18th Street to US 309/PA 29 and US 309 Byp. at the intersection of 19th Street and Main Boulevard on the northern edge of Allentown. By 1950, the branch of PA 329 from Balliettsville to Allentown was decommissioned.

== Major intersections ==
County	Location	mi	km	Destinations	Notes
Lehigh	North Whitehall Township	0.000	0.000	PA 873 – Allentown, Slatington	Western terminus
Lehigh	Whitehall Township	5.072	8.163	PA 145 (MacArthur Road) – Walnutport, Allentown	
Northampton	East Allen Township	10.761	17.318	PA 987 south (Airport Road) – Allentown	West end of PA 987 concurrency
Northampton	Bath	12.881	20.730	PA 248 / PA 987 north (Main Street) to PA 512	Eastern terminus
1.000 mi = 1.609 km; 1.000 km = 0.621 mi: Concurrency terminus

== PA 329 Truck ==
Pennsylvania Route 329 Truck
- Location: Whitehall Township-East Allen Township
- Length: 12.6 mi (20.3 km)

Pennsylvania Route 329 Truck is a truck route of PA 329 around the weight-restricted bridge over the Lehigh River, on which trucks over 11 tons and combination loads over 17 tons are prohibited. The route follows PA 145, US 22, and PA 987. It was signed in 2013.
