= Trout Hall =

Historic house in Pennsylvania, United States

- U.S. National Register of Historic Places
- Pennsylvania state historical marker
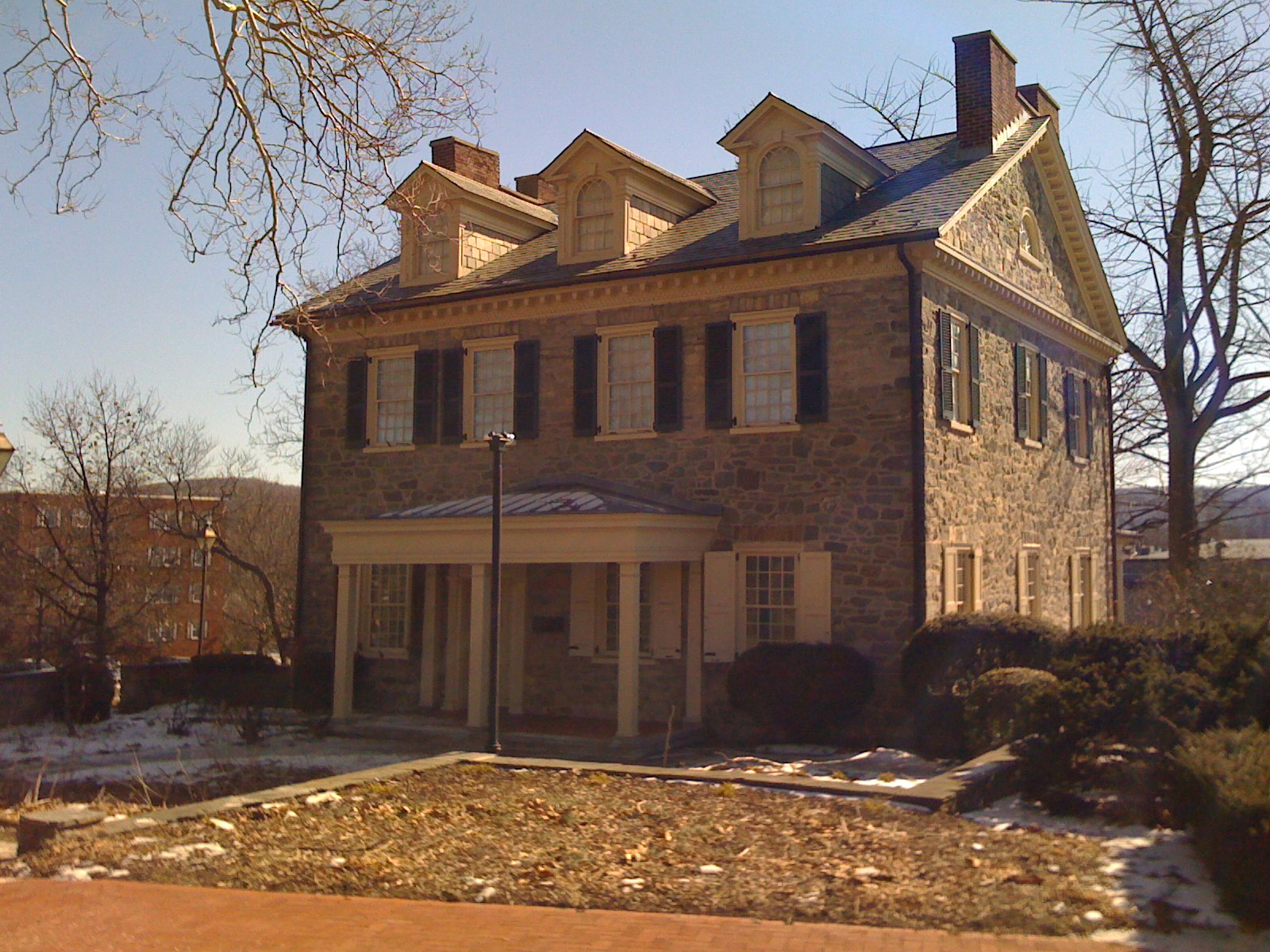
- Trout Hall in Allentown in June 2008

- Location within Pennsylvania Location within the United States
- Location: 414 West Hamilton Street, Allentown, Pennsylvania, U.S.
- Coordinates: 40°36′9″N 75°27′50″W
- Area: 0.8 acres (0.32 ha)
- Built: 1768-1770
- Architectural style: Georgian
- NRHP reference No.: 78002425

Significant dates
- Added to NRHP: November 14, 1978
- Designated PHMC: January 24, 1967

Trout Hall is an historic home located at Allentown in Lehigh County, Pennsylvania. One of the older homes in Allentown (1910 Walnut Street is the oldest), it was built between 1768 and 1770, and is a two-and-one-half-story, built with stone in Georgian architectural style.

Built as a summer home by James Allen, the third son of William Allen, founder of Allentown, it currently houses the library and museum of the Lehigh County Historical Society.

== History ==
=== 18th century ===
In 1735, William Allen (1704-1780), a wealthy shipping merchant, purchased 5,000 acres of land in the eastern region of what was then the colonial-era Province of Pennsylvania.

By 1762, Allen laid out the plans of a 42-block town that he called Northampton Towne. The name however, never took hold, and the settlement was commonly known as Allen's Town, and then was combined into Allenstown, prior to being formally named Allentown.

James Allen (1742-1778), William Allen's third son, followed in his father's footsteps. He graduated from college in 1759 and law school in 1765, and he was admitted to practice law before the Supreme Court. On October 6, 1767, James Allen was elected as common Philadelphia councilman and then the Pennsylvania Assembly by an almost unanimous vote.

Since his busy life allowed little time to manage Allentown himself, he delegated the responsibilities of running it to the people he trusted most. At times, however, he would make the 60 mile journey from Philadelphia to Allentown, which eventually justifed the need for his own house. He built the two-story stone house and called it Trout Hall after the abundance of trout in the various creeks and the Lehigh River that surrounded Allentown.

James Allen died of tuberculosis on September 19, 1778. After he died, his wife remarried and his daughters became frequent residents at Trout Hall.

=== 19th century ===
On May 17, 1789, James Allen's daughters left Allentown, and the home would be unused until the winter of 1825, when James’ eldest daughter, Anne Penn Greanleaf, gave a few blocks of the original property where Trout Hall was situated to her daughter. It was at this time that the name Trout Hall was dropped and the home was renamed The Livingston Mansion.

The Livingstons were merchants, and in 1847, when a business deal went bad, the house and surrounding land was sold to make up for his lost profits. The new owner, Comegys Paul, sold the house a week later and earned a profit for the sale. In 1848, it became the Allentown Seminary. In 1867, it became the original location of Muhlenberg College prior to the college's development of its current campus off Cedar Crest Boulevard.

=== 20th century ===
On January 9, 1904, the Lehigh County Historical Society was founded to find and restore historical landmarks in Lehigh County. Their goal was to preserve the home's past, and they restored the home's east wing, which had not been touched in decades. One year later, in 1905, Muhlenberg College relocated its campus, and the Historical Society renamed the building Trout Hall again.

Used now as a museum, Trout Hall houses Revolutionary-era artifacts for the public to view and showcases the home.s early 18th century architecture.

In 1978, in recognition of its historical notability, Trout Houl was added to the National Register of Historic Places.

== See also ==
- List of historic places in Allentown, Pennsylvania
