= North Whitehall Township, Pennsylvania =

Township in Pennsylvania, US

North Whitehall Township
- Township
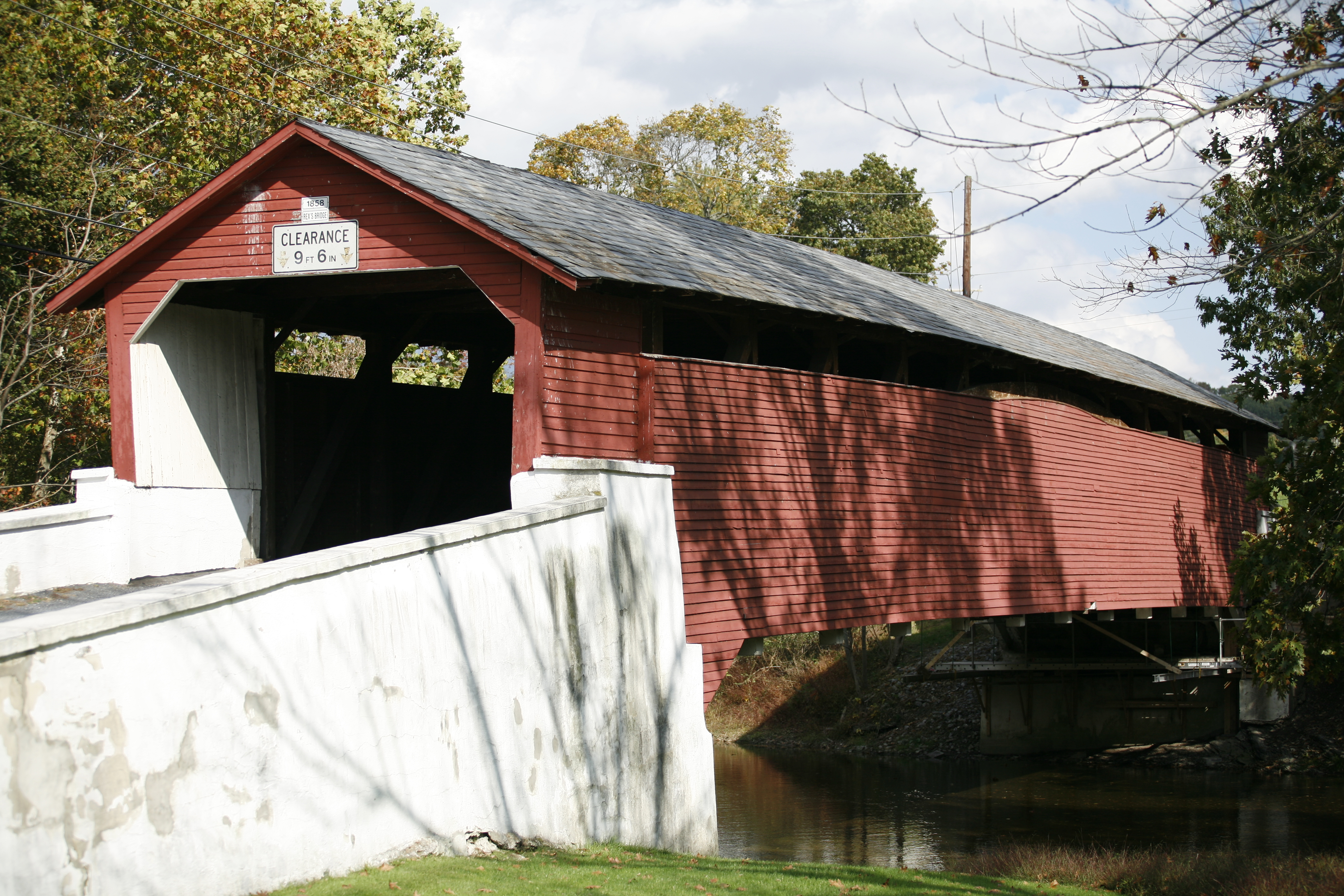
- Rex Covered Bridge in North Whitehall Township in October 2006

- Seal

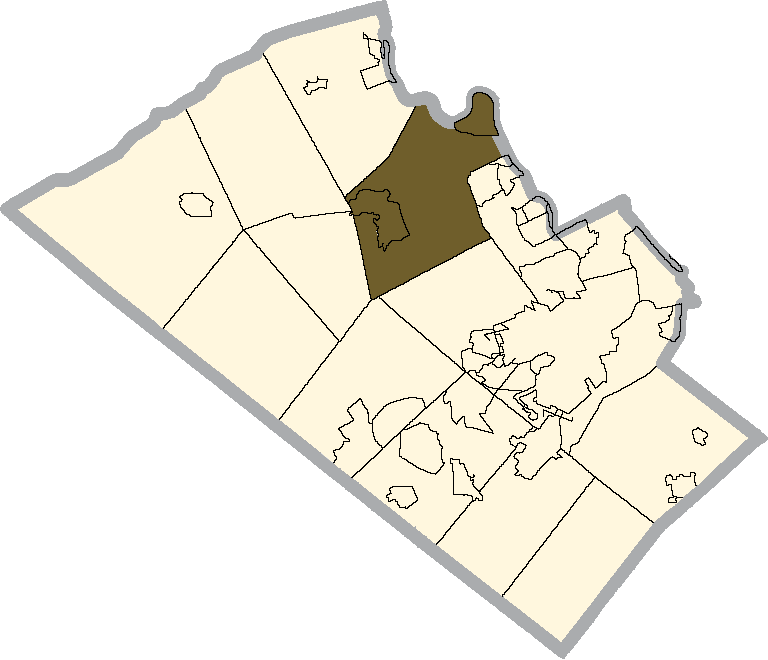
- Location of North Whitehall Township in Lehigh County, Pennsylvania

- Location of North Whitehall Township in Pennsylvania North Whitehall Twp (the United States)
- Coordinates: 40°37′27″N 75°37′25″W
- Country: United States
- State: Pennsylvania
- County: Lehigh

Area
  - Township: 28.55 sq mi (73.95 km^{2})
  - Land: 28.07 sq mi (72.71 km^{2})
  - Water: 0.48 sq mi (1.24 km^{2})
- Elevation: 627 ft (191 m)

Population (2020)
  - Township: 15,655
  - Density: 548/sq mi (211.7/km^{2})
  - Metro: 865,310 (US: 68th)
- Time zone: UTC-5 (EST)
  - Summer (DST): UTC-4 (EDT)
- ZIP Codes: 18037, 18059, 18065, 18069, 18078, 18104
- Area codes: 610 and 484
- FIPS code: 42-077-55576
- Primary airport: Lehigh Valley International Airport
- Major hospital: Lehigh Valley Hospital–Cedar Crest
- School district: Parkland
- Website: www.northwhitehall.org

North Whitehall Township is a township in Lehigh County, Pennsylvania, United States. The population of North Whitehall Township was 15,655 at the 2020 census. It is a suburb of Allentown in the Lehigh Valley, which had a population of 861,899 and was the 68th-most populous metropolitan area in the U.S. as of the 2020 census.

North Whitehall Township is located 9.4 miles (15.1 km) northwest of Allentown, 65.2 miles (104.9 km) northwest of Philadelphia, and 99.2 miles (159.6 km) west of New York City.

== Geography ==
The township is located in northeastern Lehigh County. According to the U.S. Census Bureau, it has a total area of 28.5 square miles (73.9 km^{2}), 28.1 square miles (72.7 km^{2}) of which is land and 0.46 square miles (1.2 km^{2}), or 1.56%, of which is water. It is drained by the Lehigh River, which separates it from Northampton County.

The township has a hot-summer humid continental climate (Dfa) and the hardiness zone is 6b. Average monthly temperatures in Ironton range from 28.4 °F (−2.0 °C) in January to 73.3 °F (22.9 °C) in July.

North Whitehall's villages include Ballietsville, Coffeetown, Ironton, Kernsville, Laurys Station, Mechanicsville (also in South Whitehall Township), Meyersville (also in South Whitehall), Neffs (also in Washington Township), Orefield (also in South Whitehall), Ormrod, Ruchsville, Scheidy, and Schnecksville.

=== Adjacent municipalities ===
- Whitehall Township (east)
- South Whitehall Township (south)
- Upper Macungie Township (tangent to the southwest)
- Lowhill Township (west)
- Heidelberg Township (west)
- Washington Township (northwest)
- Lehigh Township, Northampton County (north)
- Allen Township, Northampton County (northeast)
- Northampton, Northampton County (tangent to the east)

== Demographics ==
Historical population
Census	Pop.	Note	%±
2000	14,731		—
2010	15,703		6.6%
2020	15,655		−0.3%

As of the census of 2010, there were 15,703 people, 5,766 households, and 4,453 families residing in the township. The population density was 543.4 inhabitants per square mile (209.8/km^{2}). There were 6,000 housing units at an average density of 207.6 units per square mile (80.2 units/km^{2}). The racial makeup of the township was 94.71% White, 1.53% African American, 0.12% Native American, 1.34% Asian, 0.01% Pacific Islander, 1.02% from other races, and 1.26% from two or more races. Hispanic or Latino of any race were 3.69% of the population.

There were 5,766 households, out of which 36.39% had children under the age of 18 living with them, 64.46% were married couples living together, 4.06% had a male household with no wife present, 8.71% had a female householder with no husband present, and 22.77% were non-families. 18.21% of all households were made up of individuals, and 7.25% had someone living alone who was 65 years of age or older. The average household size was 2.68 and the average family size was 3.05.

In the township, the population was spread out, with 27.74% under the age of 20, 4.36% from 20 to 24, 20.99% from 25 to 44, 33.87% from 45 to 64, and 13.04% who were 65 years of age or older. The median age was 43.3 years. For every 100 females there were 98.72 males. For every 100 females age 18 and over, there were 94.94 males age 18 and over. As of 2015, the median income for a household in the township was $75,714, and the median income for a family was $89,182. Males had a median income of $56,152 versus $43,855 for females. The per capita income for the township was $35,470. About 4.1% of families and 4.8% of the population were below the poverty line, including 5.0% of those under age 18 and 9.1% of those age 65 or over.

United States presidential election results for North Whitehall Township, Pennsylvania
Year	Republican		Democratic		Third party(ies)	
Year	No.	%	No.	%	No.	%
2024	5,968	59.58%	3,945	39.38%	104	1.04%
2020	5,777	58.57%	3,979	40.34%	108	1.09%
2016	5,158	61.26%	2,969	35.26%	293	3.48%
2012	4,587	60.36%	2,925	38.49%	88	1.16%
2008	4,184	53.63%	3,529	45.23%	89	1.14%
2004	4,364	59.00%	2,989	40.41%	44	0.59%

== Education ==
=== Primary education ===
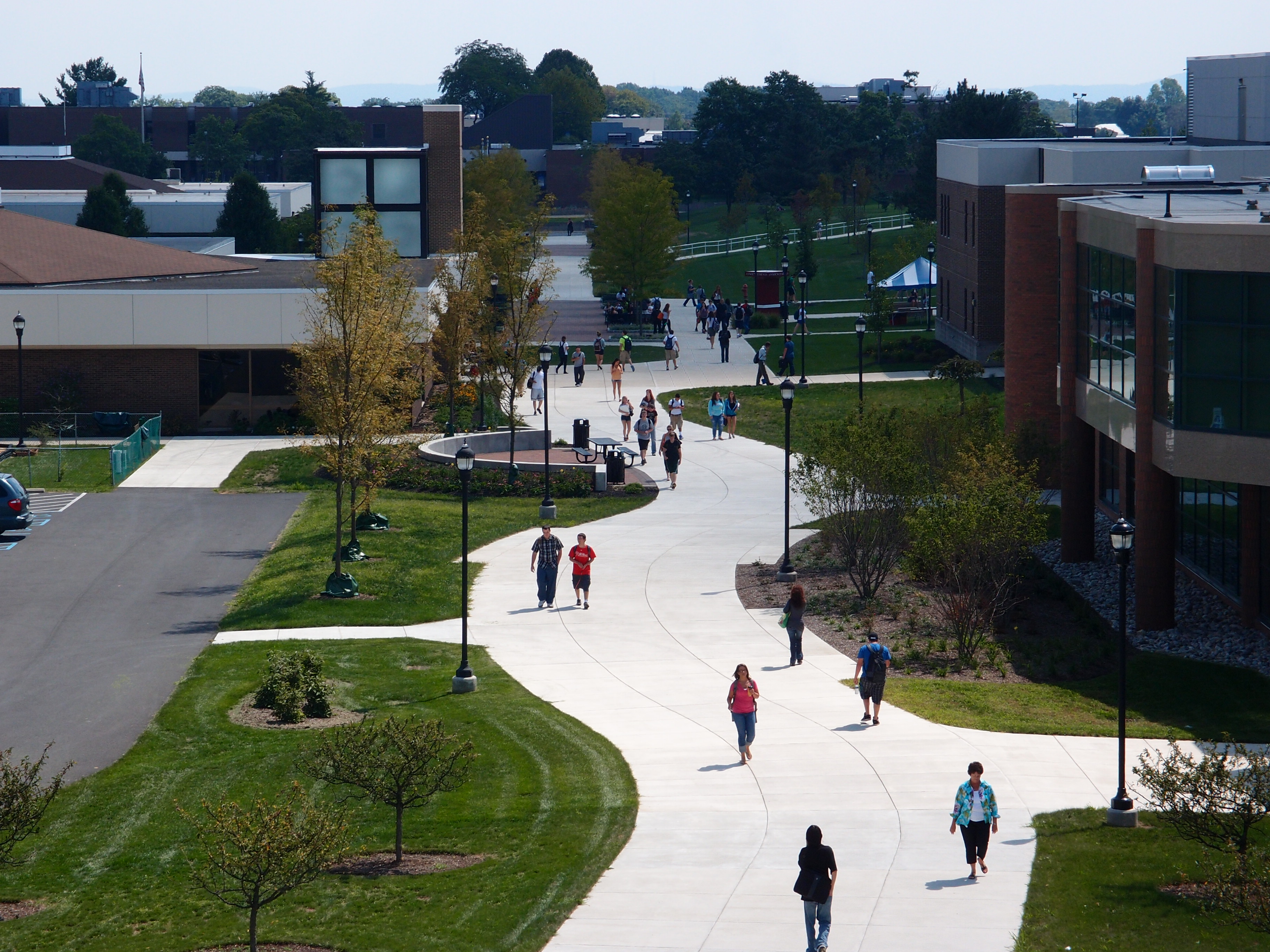
Lehigh Carbon Community College in Schnecksville in North Whitehall Township, in 2014

Along with South Whitehall and Upper Macungie townships, North Whitehall Township is served by the Parkland School District. Ironton, Kernsville, and Schnecksville Elementary Schools are located in North Whitehall Township. Secondary students attend Orefield Middle School in Orefield and Parkland High School in Allentown.

=== Community college ===
North Whitehall Township is also home to Lehigh Carbon Community College in Schnecksville.

== Transportation ==
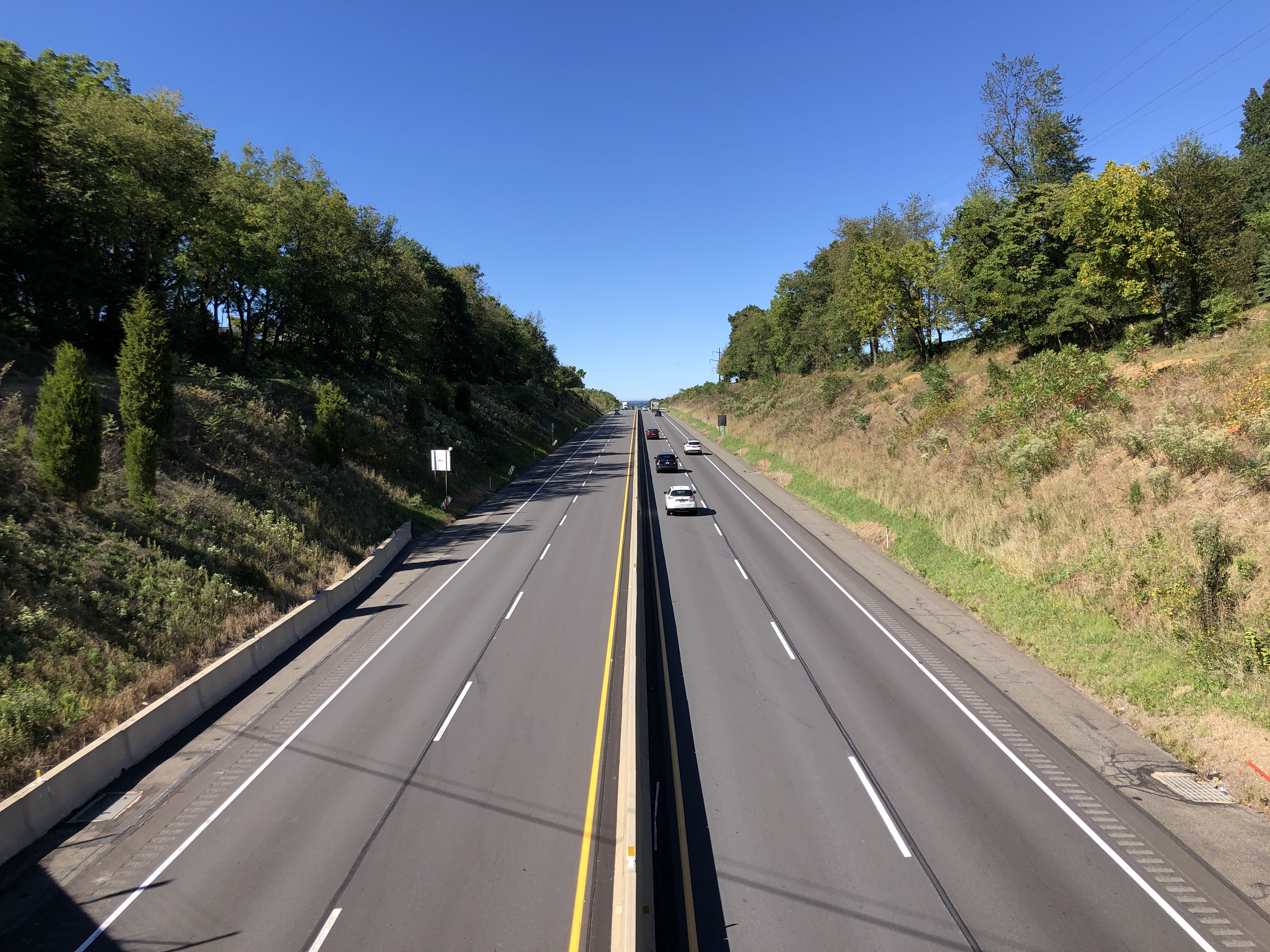
I-476, the Northeast Extension of the Pennsylvania Turnpike North, in North Whitehall Township

As of 2020, there were 159.25 miles (256.29 km) of public roads in North Whitehall Township, of which 4.70 miles (7.56 km) were maintained by the Pennsylvania Turnpike Commission (PTC), 37.84 miles (60.90 km) were maintained by the Pennsylvania Department of Transportation (PennDOT) and 116.71 miles (187.83 km) were maintained by the township.

Interstate 476 follows the Pennsylvania Turnpike's Northeast Extension along a northwest–southeast alignment across southern and western portions of North Whitehall Township, but the closest interchange is in neighboring South Whitehall Township. Numbered highways providing local access include Pennsylvania Route 309, Pennsylvania Route 873, Pennsylvania Route 329, and Pennsylvania Route 145. Another thoroughfare is Mauch Chunk Road, which runs from PA 329 in Ballietsville into Allentown. LANta serves the township with bus route 325 along the Route 309/873 corridor.
