= Neffs, Pennsylvania =

Unincorporated community in Pennsylvania, US

- Unincorporated community
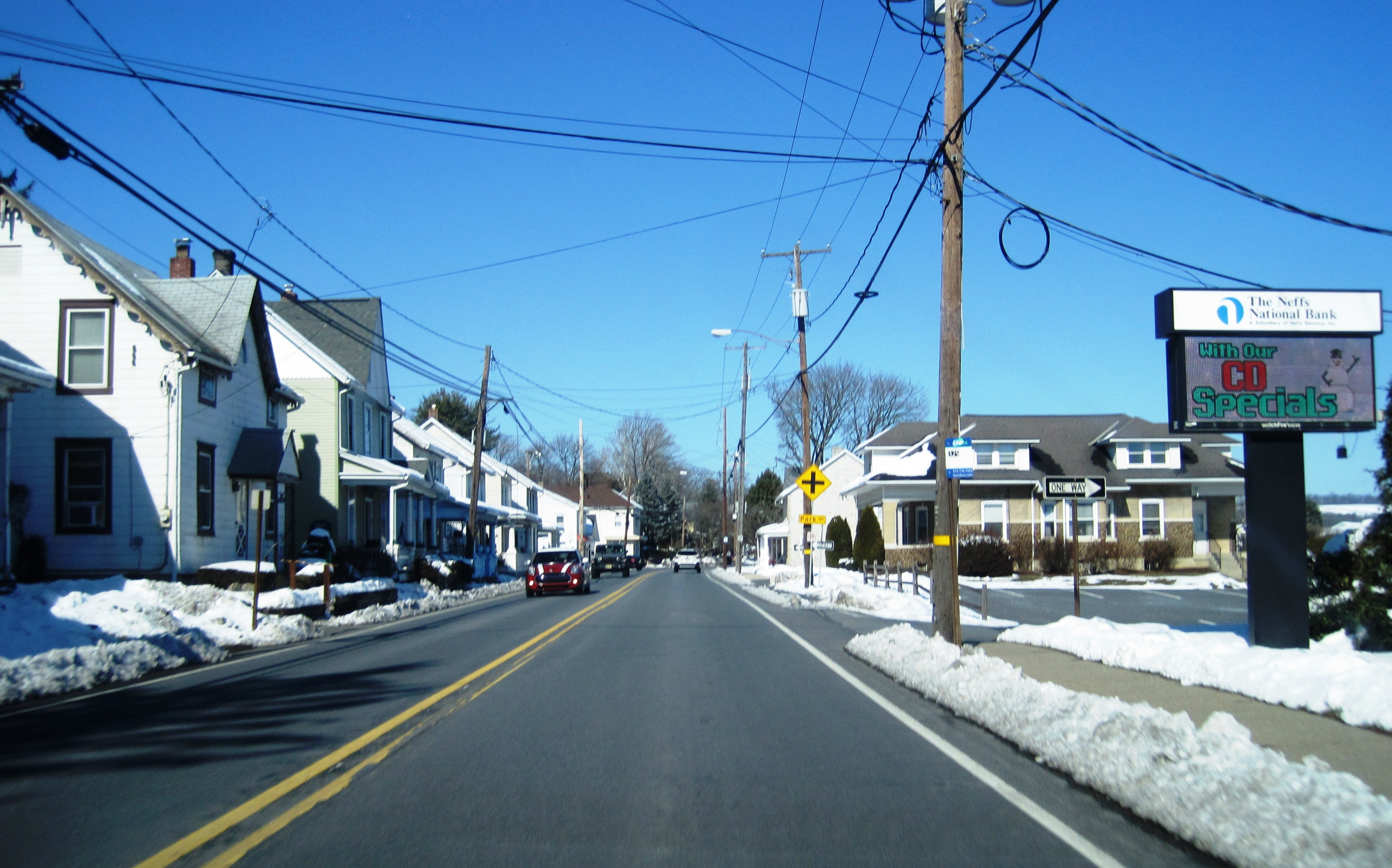
- Northbound PA 873 in Neffs

- Location within Pennsylvania Location within the United States
- Coordinates: 40°41′40″N 75°36′35″W
- Country: United States
- State: Pennsylvania
- County: Lehigh
- Township: North Whitehall and Washington
- Elevation: 689 ft (210 m)

Population
  - Metro: 865,310 (US: 68th)
- Time zone: UTC-5 (Eastern (EST))
  - Summer (DST): UTC-4 (EDT)
- ZIP Code: 18065
- Area codes: 610 and 484
- GNIS feature ID: 1182214

Neffs is a small village that is located mainly in North Whitehall Township and also partially in Washington Township in Lehigh County, Pennsylvania. It is part of the Lehigh Valley, which has a population of 861,899 and is the 68th-most populous metropolitan area in the U.S. as of the 2020 census.

Neffs is located at the junction of Pennsylvania Routes 873 and 329, approximately one mile north of Schnecksville.

== History ==
The town was initially called Unionville after the Union Church that was established there in 1797. The town's first store was built in 1815. The current town name honors Abraham Neff, first postmaster of the Neffs post office. Abraham Neff laid out the village while running a coach business and local hotel. The area then became "Neffsville", a name that was later shortened to "Neffs".

The present day Neffs post office was built in 1967. At that time, the first non-agricultural manufacturing plant was built in Neffs by Ted Ambrosino, who established Ambro Fashions. The town was so concerned about the influx of additional mail and post office activity that it applied for and won a federal grant to build an upgraded modern post office facility.

The ZIP Code for Neffs is 18065, and it is in the 610 area code.
