= Seipsville Hotel =

- U.S. National Register of Historic Places
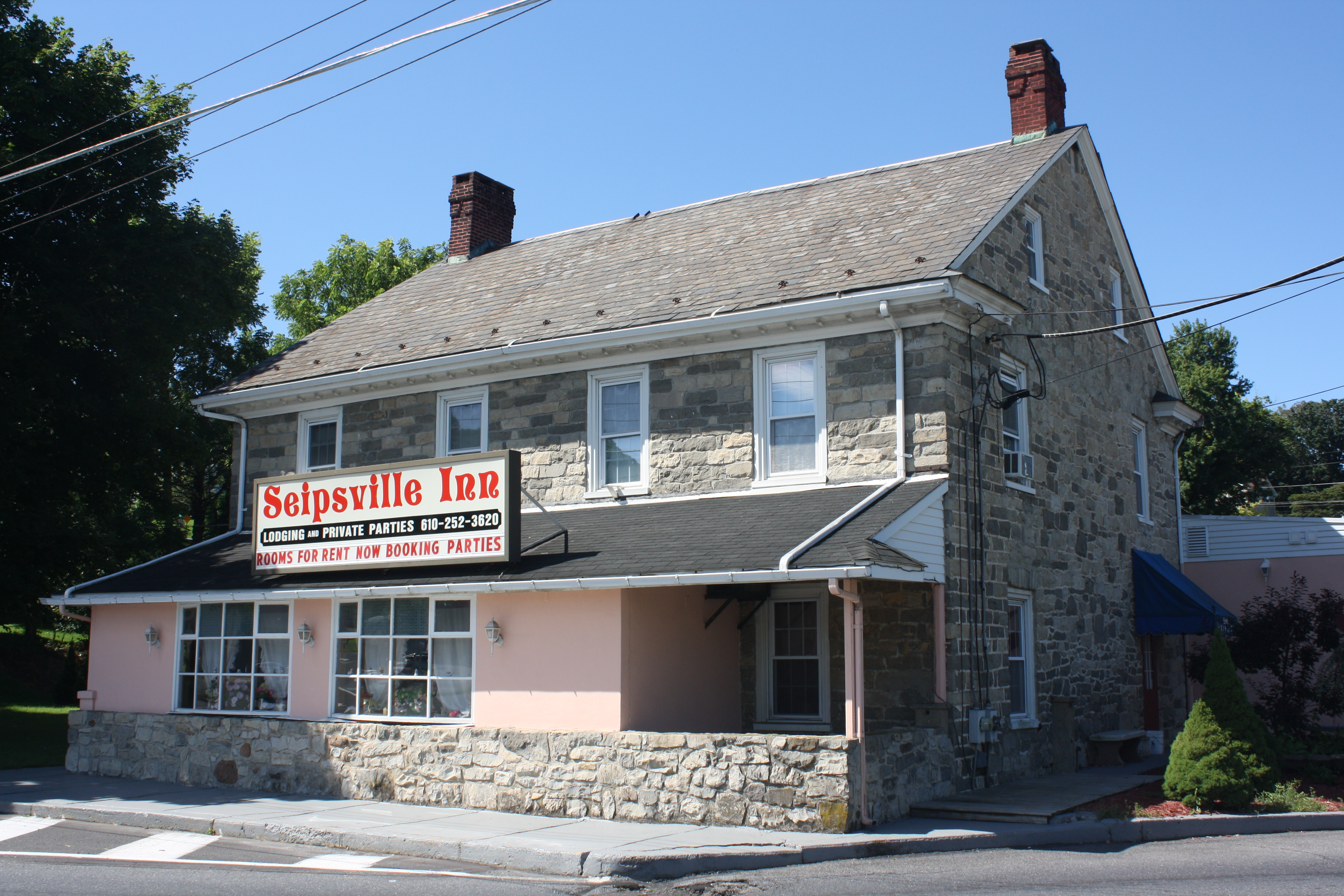
- Seipsville Hotel in Palmer Township, Pennsylvania in August 2013

- Location within Pennsylvania Location within the United States
- Location: 2912 Old Nazareth Rd., Palmer Township, Pennsylvania
- Coordinates: 40°41′37″N 75°15′45″W
- Area: 2 acres (0.81 ha)
- Built: 1760
- NRHP reference No.: 77001178
- Added to NRHP: May 6, 1977

The Seipsville Hotel, also known as Seip's Hotel, Seip's Tavern, and the Seipsville Rib House, is an historic inn and tavern in Palmer Township in Northampton County, Pennsylvania, United States.

It was added to the National Register of Historic Places in 1977.

== History and architectural features ==
Built in 1760, this historic structure is a two-and-one-half-story, four-bay, fieldstone building with a gable roof with two gable end brick chimneys and an adjoining 1 1/2-story spring house. In addition to being an inn and tavern, this building houses a post office, a polling place, and a community meeting center. It is now operated as a bed and breakfast known as the Seipsville Inn.

== Gallery ==
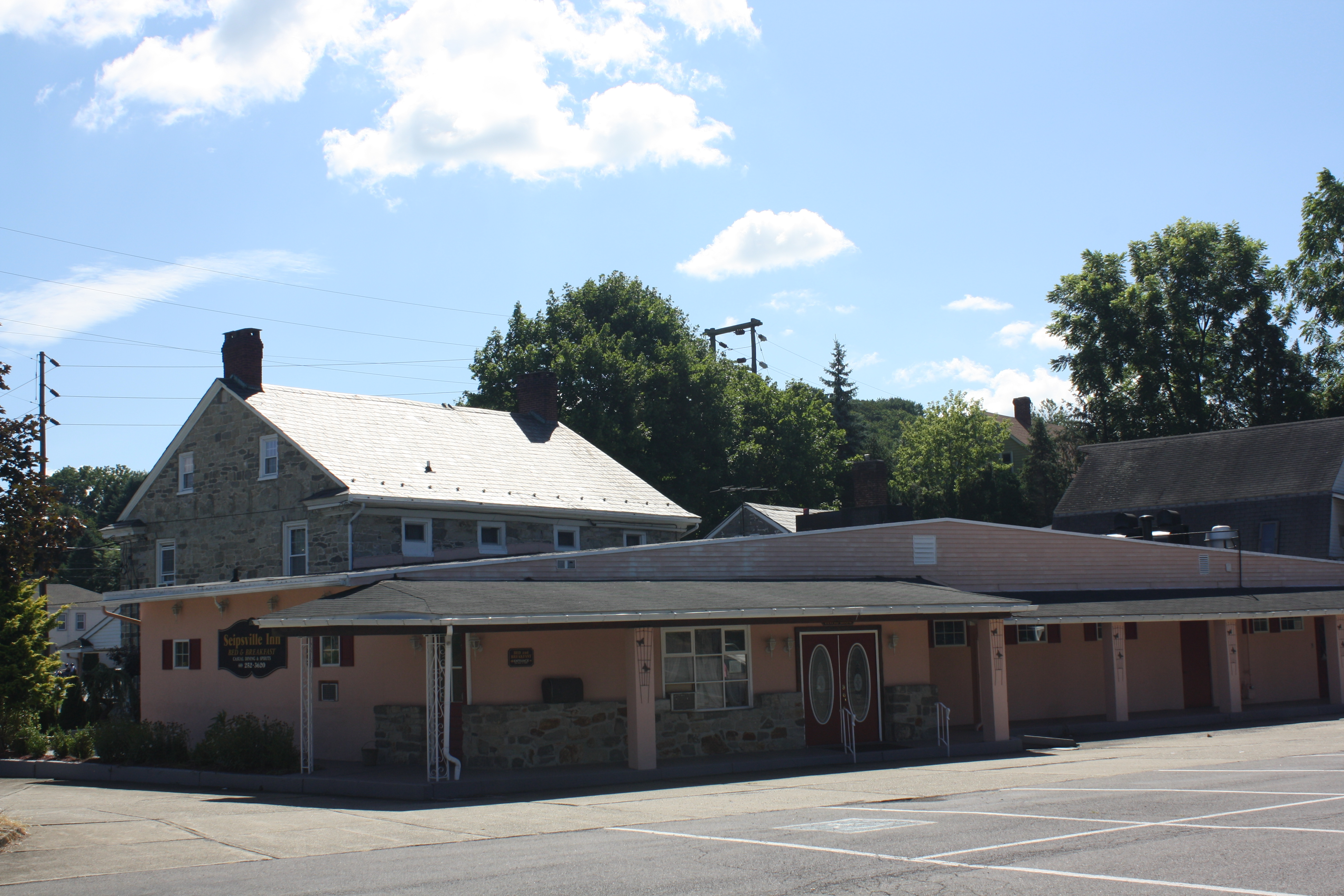

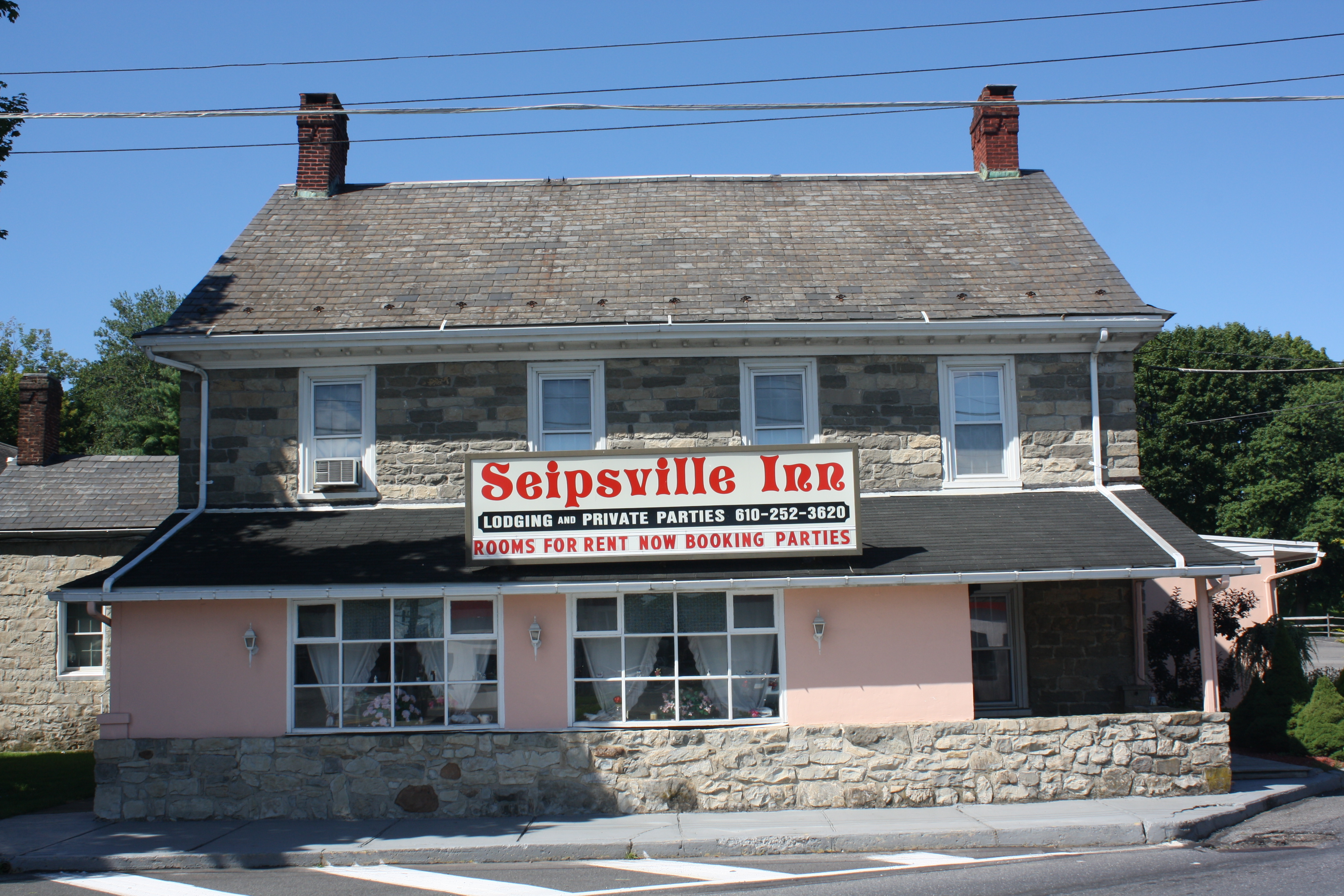

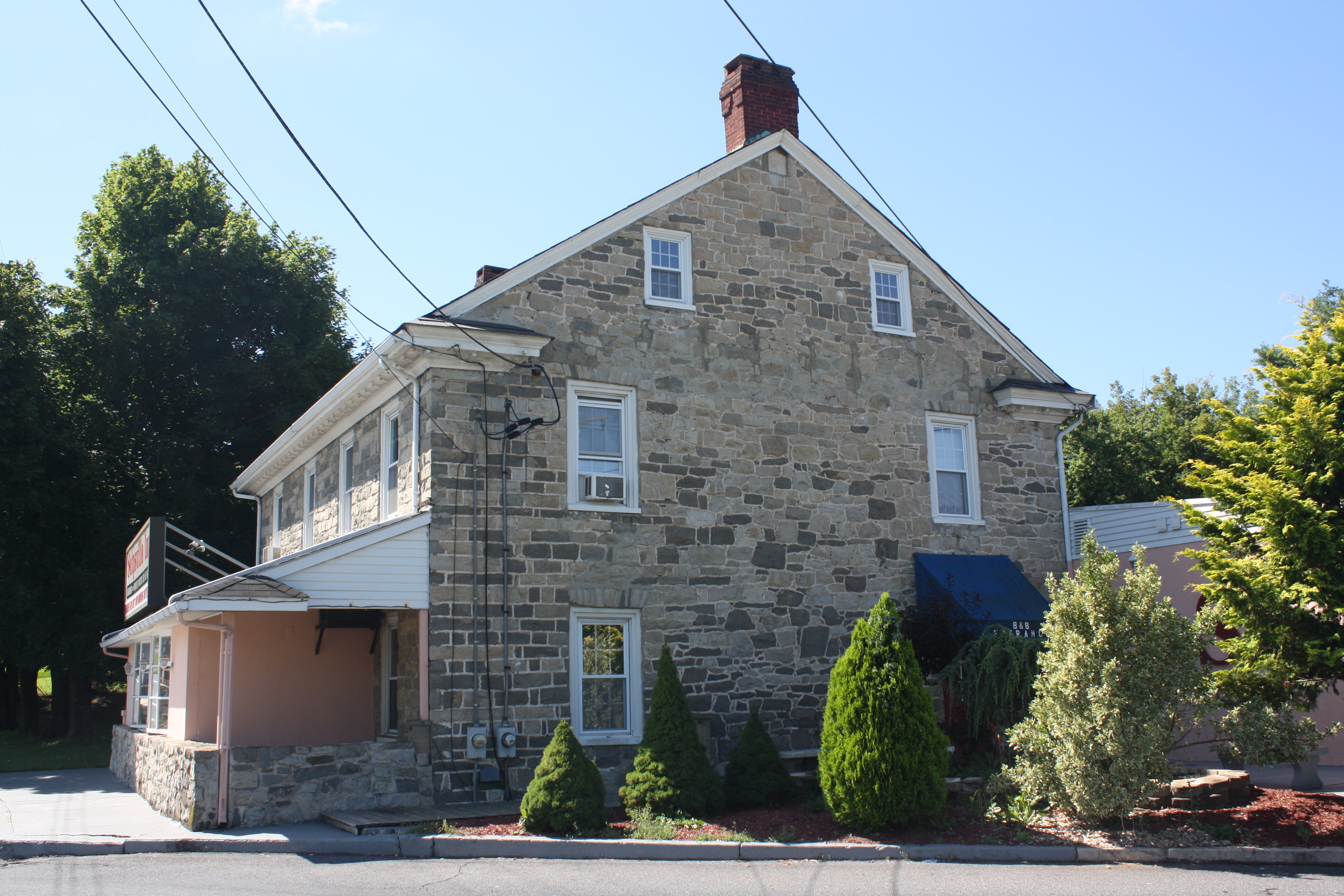

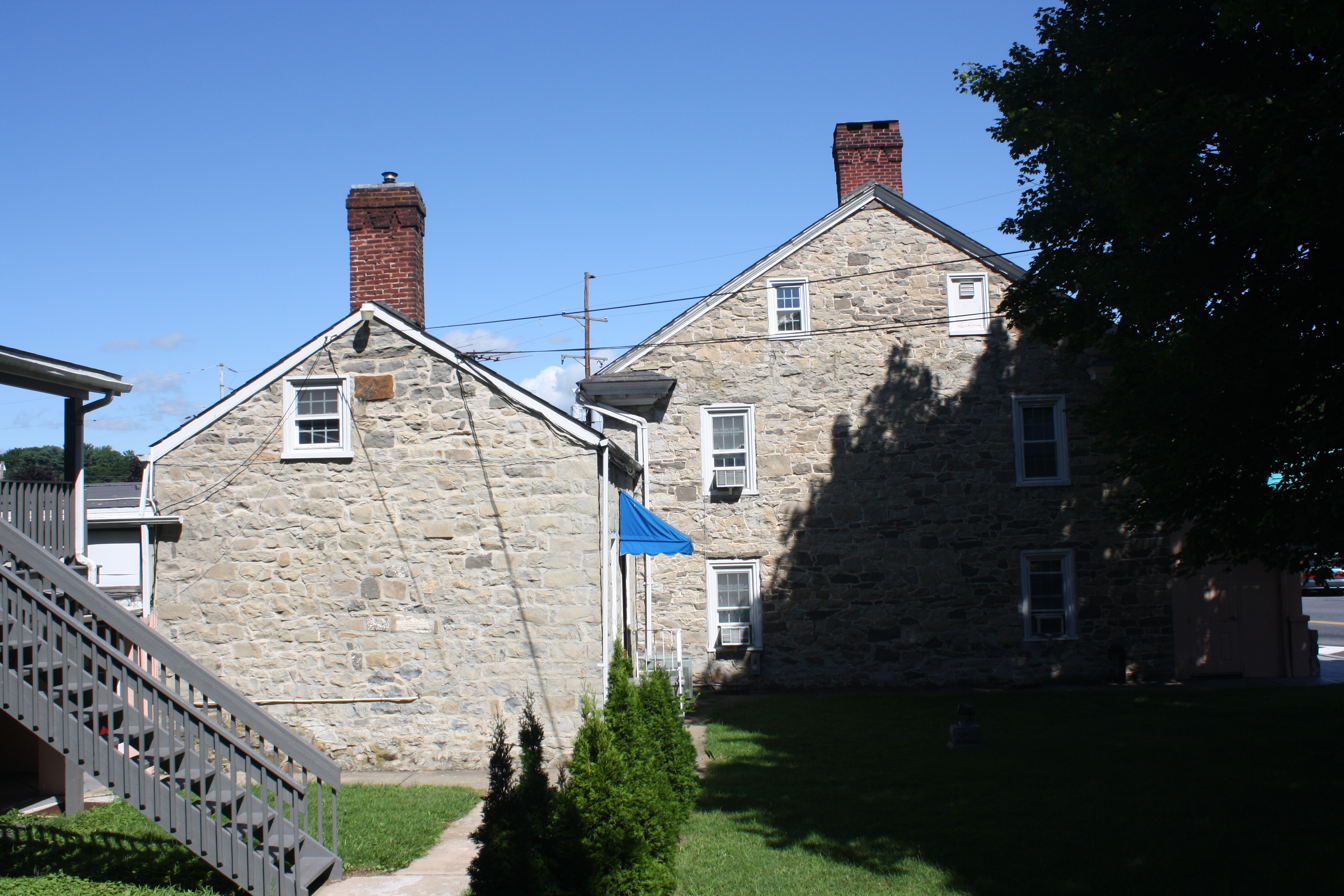
