= Palmer Heights, Pennsylvania =

Unincorporated community in Pennsylvania, US

- Census-designated community
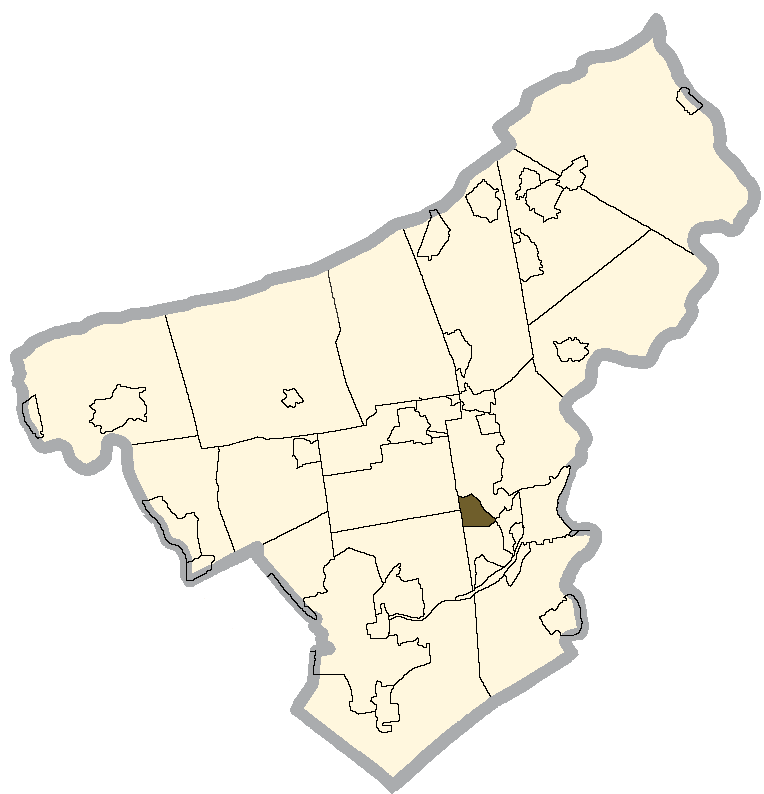
- Location of Palmer Heights in Northampton County, Pennsylvania
- Coordinates: 40°41′30″N 75°15′56″W
- Country: United States
- State: Pennsylvania
- County: Northampton

Area
  - Census-designated community: 1.2 sq mi (3.1 km^{2})
  - Land: 1.2 sq mi (3.1 km^{2})
  - Water: 0.0 sq mi (0 km^{2})
- Elevation: 364 ft (111 m)

Population (2010)
  - Census-designated community: 3,762
  - Density: 3,100/sq mi (1,200/km^{2})
  - Metro: 865,310 (US: 68th)
- Time zone: UTC-5 (EST)
  - Summer (DST): UTC-4 (EDT)
- ZIP Code: 18045
- Area code: 610

Palmer Heights is a census-designated place (CDP) in the Town of Palmer, Pennsylvania. The population of Palmer Heights was 3,762 at the 2010 census. Palmer Heights is part of the Lehigh Valley, which had a population of 861,899 and was the 68th-most populous metropolitan area in the U.S. as of the 2020 census.

== Geography ==
Palmer Heights is located at 40°41′30″N 75°15′56″W (40.691698, -75.265654). According to the U.S. Census Bureau, Palmer Heights has a total area of 1.2 square miles (3.1 km^{2}), all land.

== Demographics ==
=== 2020 census ===
As of the 2020 census, Palmer Heights had a population of 3,734. The median age was 50.2 years. 18.1% of residents were under the age of 18 and 27.8% of residents were 65 years of age or older. For every 100 females there were 93.9 males, and for every 100 females age 18 and over there were 90.6 males age 18 and over.

100.0% of residents lived in urban areas, while 0.0% lived in rural areas.

There were 1,445 households in Palmer Heights, of which 26.1% had children under the age of 18 living in them. Of all households, 58.1% were married-couple households, 12.2% were households with a male householder and no spouse or partner present, and 23.7% were households with a female householder and no spouse or partner present. About 21.6% of all households were made up of individuals and 11.9% had someone living alone who was 65 years of age or older.

There were 1,465 housing units, of which 1.4% were vacant. The homeowner vacancy rate was 0.8% and the rental vacancy rate was 3.1%.

Racial composition as of the 2020 census
Race	Number	Percent
White	3,110	83.3%
Black or African American	180	4.8%
American Indian and Alaska Native	8	0.2%
Asian	40	1.1%
Native Hawaiian and Other Pacific Islander	0	0.0%
Some other race	155	4.2%
Two or more races	241	6.5%
Hispanic or Latino (of any race)	409	11.0%

=== 2000 census ===
As of the 2000 census, there were 3,612 people, 1,405 households, and 1,036 families residing in the CDP. The population density was 3,012.6 inhabitants per square mile (1,163.2/km^{2}). There were 1,428 housing units at an average density of 1,191.0 per square mile (459.8/km^{2}). The racial makeup of the CDP was 95.43% White, 1.66% African American, 0.11% Native American, 1.25% Asian, 0.03% Pacific Islander, 0.91% from other races, and 0.61% from two or more races. Hispanic or Latino of any race were 2.63% of the population.

There were 1,405 households, out of which 25.5% had children under the age of 18 living with them, 65.4% were married couples living together, 5.8% had a female householder with no husband present, and 26.2% were non-families. 22.6% of all households were made up of individuals, and 14.0% had someone living alone who was 65 years of age or older. The average household size was 2.43 and the average family size was 2.86.

In Palmer Heights, the population was spread out, with 17.6% under the age of 18, 5.0% from 18 to 24, 23.7% from 25 to 44, 27.2% from 45 to 64, and 26.5% who were 65 years of age or older. The median age was 47 years. For every 100 females, there were 90.0 males. For every 100 females age 18 and over, there were 85.5 males.

The median income for a household in the CDP was $51,625, and the median income for a family was $61,630. Males had a median income of $40,481 versus $32,429 for females. The per capita income for the CDP was $23,959. About 2.0% of families and 2.6% of the population were below the poverty line, including none of those under age 18 and 7.5% of those age 65 or over.

== Education ==
The community is served by the Easton Area School District. Students in grades nine through 12 attend Easton Area High School in Easton.
