= Old Orchard, Pennsylvania =

Unincorporated community in Pennsylvania, US

- Census-designated place
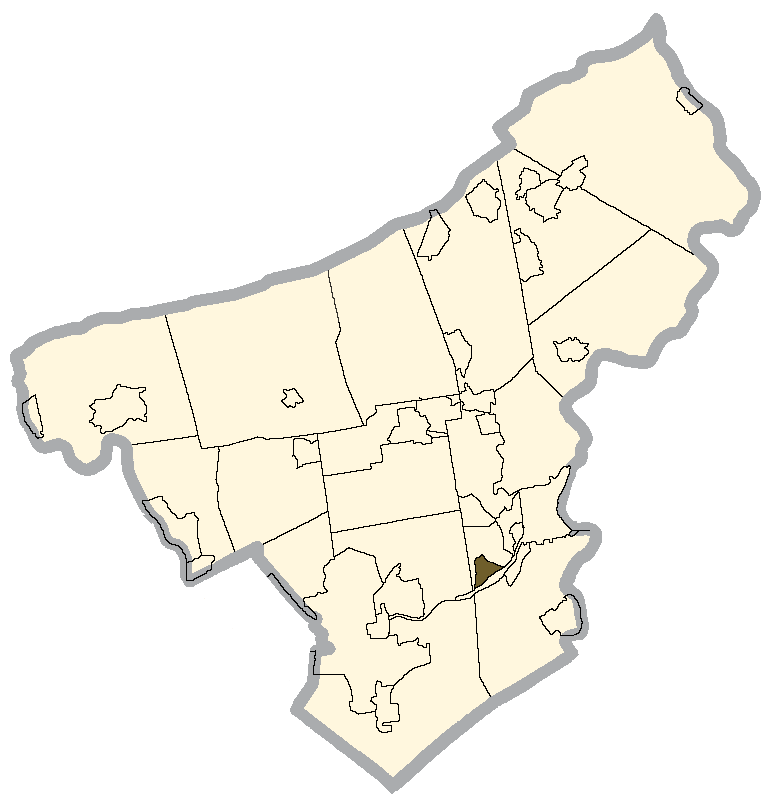
- Location of Old Orchard in Northampton County, Pennsylvania
- Coordinates: 40°39′21″N 75°15′29″W
- Country: United States
- State: Pennsylvania
- County: Northampton

Area
  - Census-designated place: 0.6 sq mi (1.6 km^{2})
  - Land: 0.6 sq mi (1.6 km^{2})
  - Water: 0.0 sq mi (0 km^{2})
- Elevation: 410 ft (120 m)

Population (2010)
  - Census-designated place: 2,434
  - Density: 4,100/sq mi (1,600/km^{2})
  - Metro: 865,310 (US: 68th)
- Time zone: UTC-5 (EST)
  - Summer (DST): UTC-4 (EDT)
- ZIP code: 18045
- Area code: 610

Old Orchard is a census-designated place (CDP) in Palmer Township in Northampton County, Pennsylvania, United States. As of the 2010 census, Old Orchard had a total population of 2,434. Old Orchard is part of the Lehigh Valley, which had a population of 861,899 and was the 68th-most populous metropolitan area in the U.S. as of the 2020 census.

== Geography ==
Old Orchard is located at 40°39′21″N 75°15′29″W (40.392115|-75.152950). According to the U.S. Census Bureau, the CDP has a total area of 0.6 square miles (1.6 km^{2}), all land.

== Demographics ==
As of the 2000 census, there were 2,443 people, 926 households, and 752 families residing in the CDP. The population density was 3,797.6 inhabitants per square mile (1,466.3/km^{2}). There were 940 housing units at an average density of 1,461.2 per square mile (564.2/km^{2}). The racial makeup of the CDP was 96.19% White, 1.15% African American, 0.12% Native American, 1.56% Asian, 0.20% from other races, and 0.78% from two or more races. Hispanic or Latino of any race were 0.74% of the population.

There were 926 households, out of which 29.3% had children under the age of 18 living with them, 74.0% were married couples living together, 5.1% had a female householder with no husband present, and 18.7% were non-families. 15.9% of all households were made up of individuals, and 10.6% had someone living alone who was 65 years of age or older. The average household size was 2.64 and the average family size was 2.96.

In Old Orchard, the population was spread out, with 22.1% under the age of 18, 5.2% from 18 to 24, 21.9% from 25 to 44, 29.4% from 45 to 64, and 21.4% who were 65 years of age or older. The median age was 46 years. For every 100 females, there were 99.1 males. For every 100 females age 18 and over, there were 93.2 males.

The median income for a household in the CDP was $63,958, and the median income for a family was $69,639. Males had a median income of $48,203 versus $38,295 for females. The per capita income for the CDP was $28,851. About 3.2% of families and 3.4% of the population were below the poverty line, including 6.2% of those under age 18 and 2.3% of those age 65 or over.

== Education ==
Old Orchard is served by the Easton Area School District. Students in grades nine through 12 attend Easton Area High School in Easton.
