= Palmer Township, Pennsylvania =

Township in Pennsylvania, US

- Township
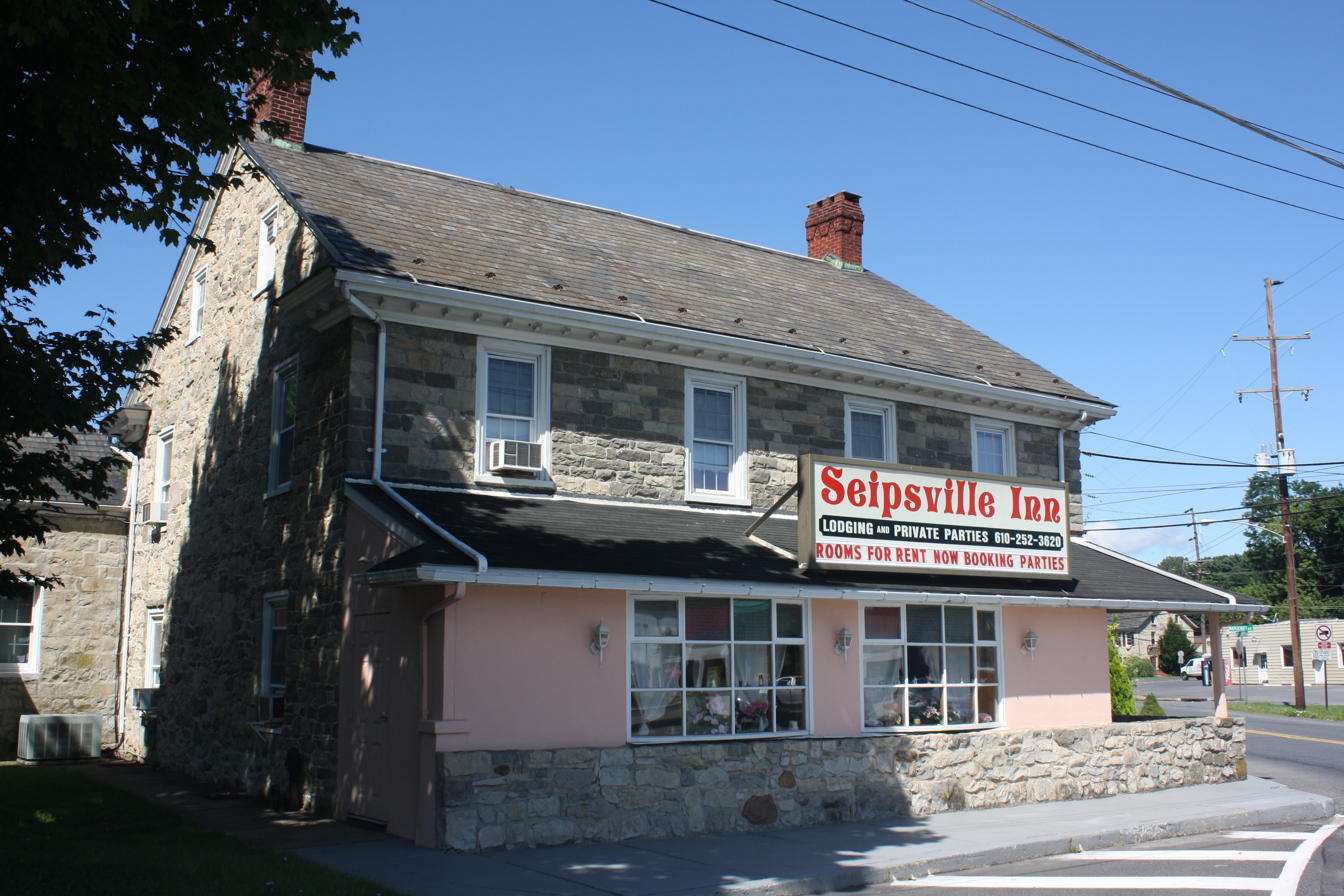
- Seipsville Hotel, built in 1760 in Palmer Township, in August 2013

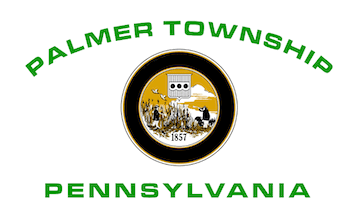
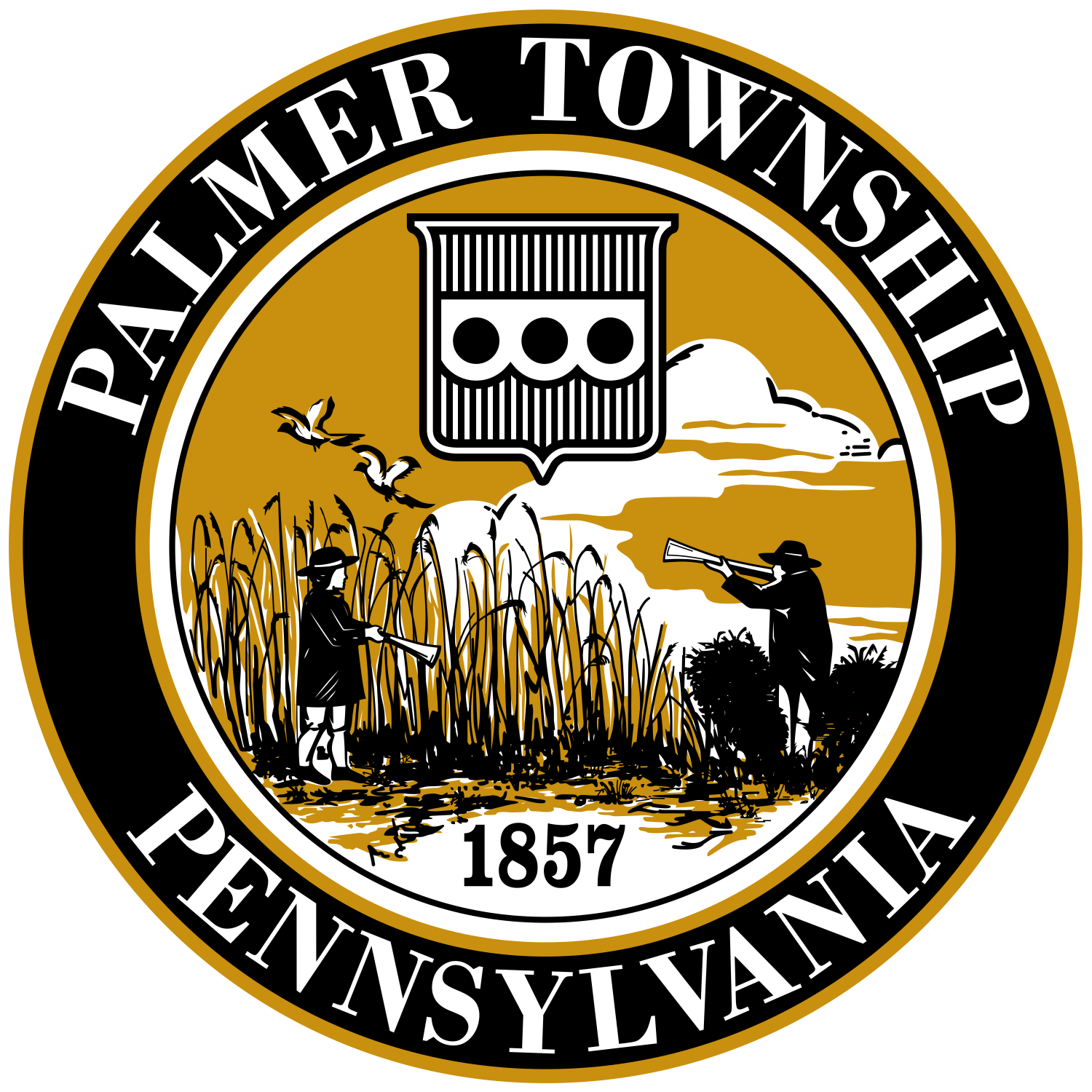
- Flag Seal

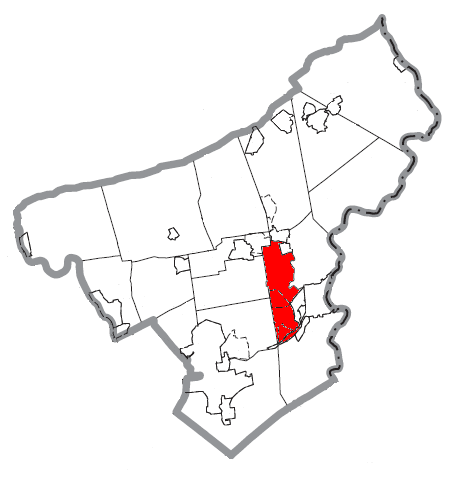
- Location of Palmer Township in Northampton County, Pennsylvania

- Location within Pennsylvania Location within the United States Location within North America
- Coordinates: 40°43′00″N 75°14′58″W
- Country: United States
- State: Pennsylvania
- County: Northampton
- Settled: 1752
- Incorporated: May 5, 1857
- Named after: George Palmer

Government
  - Type: Council-Manager
  - Body: Board of Supervisors
  - Chairman: Michael Brett (D)
  - Township Manager: Robert A. Williams

Area
  - Township: 10.35 sq mi (26.81 km^{2})
  - Land: 10.26 sq mi (26.57 km^{2})
  - Water: 0.093 sq mi (0.24 km^{2})
  - Metro: 453.60 sq mi (1,174.82 km^{2})
- Elevation: 335 ft (102 m)

Population (2020)
  - Township: 22,317
  - Rank: 8th in the Lehigh Valley; 80th in Pennsylvania
  - Density: 2,092.6/sq mi (807.94/km^{2})
  - Metro: 865,310 (US: 68th)
  - Metro density: 1,117.8/sq mi (431.6/km^{2})
- Demonym: Palmerian
- Time zone: UTC-5 (EST)
  - Summer (DST): UTC-4 (EDT)
- ZIP Code: 18045
- Area codes: 610
- FIPS code: 42-095-57672
- Primary airport: Lehigh Valley International Airport
- Major hospital: Lehigh Valley Hospital–Cedar Crest
- School district: Easton Area
- Website: www.palmertwp.com

Palmer Township is a township in Northampton County, Pennsylvania, United States. The population of Palmer Township was 22,317 at the 2020 census. It is the eight-largest municipality in the Lehigh Valley metropolitan area, which had a population of 861,899 and was the 68th-most populous metropolitan area in the U.S. as of the 2020 census.

Settled in 1740, Palmer Township is located along the Lehigh River, a 109-mile-long (175 km) tributary of the Delaware River. It is located 12 miles (19 km) northeast of Allentown, 51 miles (82 km) north of Philadelphia, and 66 miles (106 km) west of New York City.

Palmer Township is a part of the Greater Easton area, which includes the city of Easton, three townships (Forks, Palmer, and Williams), and three boroughs (Glendon, West Easton, and Wilson). The township is home to Easton Area High School, a large public high school.

== History ==
=== 18th century ===
The first known inhabitants of the area now known as Palmer Township were the Lenape Native Americans in the 17th century. German Moravian settlers built on land in the Palmer area in 1740. At the time, the area was part of Bucks County, Pennsylvania, which by the mid-18th century also included land now called Northampton County and Lehigh County.

Northampton County separated from Bucks County on March 11, 1752. In 1754, Forks Township, which then also consisted of what is now Palmer Township, was incorporated in 1754 with a total population of about 50 inhabitants.

On May 5, 1857, Palmer Township was formed out of the land area of Forks Township south and west of the Bushkill Creek; the original population of the township was about 1,300 people. The township was named after George Palmer, the Pennsylvania Surveyor General who surveyed the original township lines. At the time that it was incorporated, the township was about 14 square miles (36 km^{2}) and included what are now known as the boroughs of Tatamy (which became incorporated in 1893), West Easton (incorporated in 1898), Stockertown (incorporated in 1901), and Wilson (incorporated in 1920).

The main activity of Palmer Township during its earliest years was providing access roads from neighboring Easton to surrounding communities, including Bethlehem, Freemansburg, and Nazareth.

=== 19th century ===
During the late 18th and early 19th centuries, the township included many stone houses near water, for purposes of power and water supply, and roads, to allow for trade. Among them were the Seipsville Hotel, which was built by the settler Peter Seip in 1760 at the crossroads of roads leading from Easton, Nazareth, and Hecktown. Seip had purchased land along the west side of Old Nazareth Road; the area later became known as Seipsville in honor of Seip. The Seipsville Hotel was the first public house between Easton and Nazareth, and became a popular stagecoach stop for travelers passing through the Lehigh Valley.

In 1977, the building, now known as the Seipsville Inn, was added to the National Register of Historic Places due to the significance of its architecture and engineering.

=== 20th century ===
The township started to experience major growth after World War I and World War II as part of a general trend of population movement from nearby cities to the suburbs. In the early 1920s, subdivision activity along inter-city trolley lines led to a building spurt in Palmer Township, which doubled the population within 10 years. As a result, the township became seen as a desirable place to live for people who worked in other areas of the Lehigh Valley.

The population grew further in the late 1940s and early 1950s due to the expansion of water lines and the development of low-income housing.

== Geography ==
=== Topography ===
According to the U.S. Census Bureau, the township has a total area of 10.35 square miles (26.8 km^{2}). Of this, 10.26 square miles (26.6 km^{2}) is land and 0.09 square miles (0.2 km^{2}) is water, according to the U.S. Census Bureau. Bodies of water include Lehigh River, Bushkill Creek, and Schoeneck Creek, all of which ultimately drain into the Delaware River

Its villages include Seipsville, Highland Park, Old Orchard, Palmer Heights, Palmer Park, and Prospect Park, also in Bethlehem Township.

=== Neighboring municipalities ===
- Wilson (east)
- Forks Township (east)
- Tatamy (northeast)
- Stockertown (north)
- Lower Nazareth Township (west)
- Bethlehem Township (west)
- Easton (south and tangent to the east)

=== Climate ===
Under the Köppen climate classification, Palmer Township falls within either a hot-summer humid continental climate (Dfa) if the 0 °C (32 °F) isotherm is used or a humid subtropical climate (Cfa) if the −3 °C (27 °F) isotherm is used. Summers are typically warm and muggy, fall and spring are generally mild, and winter is cool to cold. Precipitation is almost uniformly distributed throughout the year.

The average temperature in January is 30.1 °F (−1.1 °C) and the lowest officially-recorded temperature was −15 °F (−26 °C) on January 21, 1994. July averages 75.6 °F (24.2 °C) and the highest temperature on record was 105 °F (41 °C) on July 3, 1966. January temperatures average below freezing, seven months average above 50 °F (10.0 °C), and two months average above 71.6 °F (22.0 °C).

Snowfall is variable with some winters bringing light snow and others bringing multiple and significant snowstorms. Average snowfall is 33.1 inches (84 cm) seasonally with February receiving the highest snowfall at just under 11 inches (280 mm). Rainfall is generally spread throughout the year with eight to 12 days of precipitation per month at an average annual rate of 43.5 inches (110.5 cm). Palmer Township falls under the USDA 6b Plant hardiness zone.

== Government ==
Palmer Township operates a council-manager form of government. Residents elect five township supervisors, a tax collector, and three auditors. The Board of Supervisors collectively manage the township under the direction of an appointed Township Manager. The current supervisors are Chairperson Michael Brett (D), Vice Chairperson Baron Vanderburg (D), Joseph Armato (D), Marcella Cardone (D), and Tung-To Lam (D). The Chairperson and Vice Chairperson are elected every year in January by their fellow Supervisors.

Palmer Township is part of Pennsylvania's 7th congressional district, represented in the U.S. House of Representatives currently by Republican Ryan Mackenzie, who was first elected to the office in 2024.

== Transportation ==
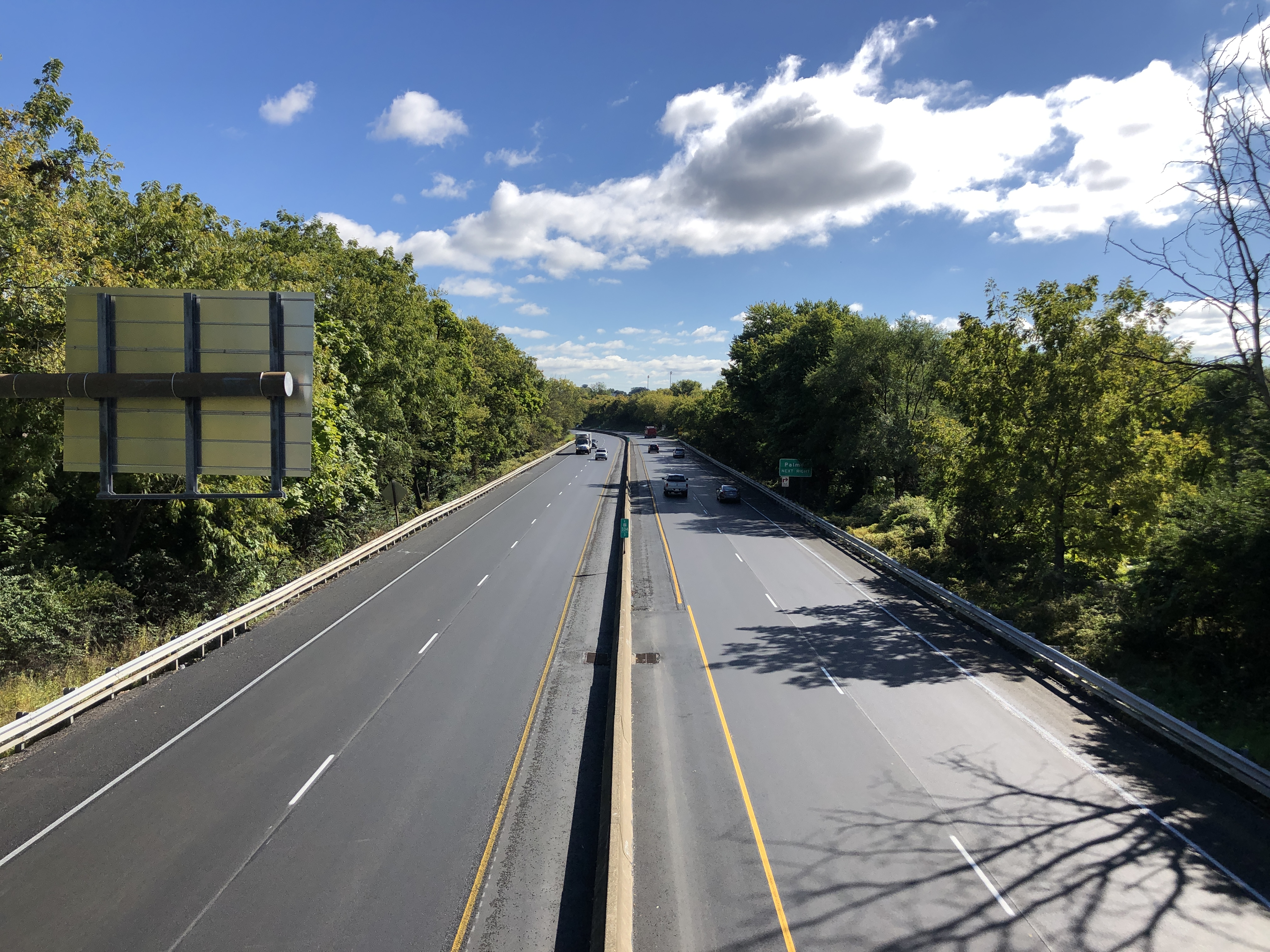
US 22 East in Palmer Township

=== Airports ===
The region's primary commercial airport, Lehigh Valley International Airport, is located in Hanover Township and is operated by Lehigh–Northampton Airport Authority. The airport has direct flights to Atlanta, Charlotte, Chicago–O'Hare, Detroit, Philadelphia, and several cities in Florida. The region is also served by Allentown Queen City Municipal Airport, a two-runway facility located on Lehigh Street in South Allentown used predominantly by private aircraft.

=== Roads ===
As of 2021, there were 113.47 miles (182.61 km) of public roads in Palmer Township, of which 20.17 miles (32.46 km) were maintained by the Pennsylvania Department of Transportation (PennDOT) and 93.09 miles (149.81 km) were maintained by the township.

U.S. Route 22 crosses Palmer Township east-to-west and interchanges in the township just west of Wilson with Pennsylvania Route 248, which connects Easton and Nazareth. North-to-south Pennsylvania Route 33 crosses the northwestern portion of Palmer, with an interchange at Tatamy Road within the township. Other local roads of note include east-to-west Freemansburg Road, William Penn Highway, Park Avenue/Hecktown Road, Northwood Avenue, and Main Street/Nazareth Road, and north-to-south 25th Street, Bushkill Drive, Greenwood Avenue, Tatamy Road, and Van Buren Road.

=== Private and public bus services ===
Public transportation is provided by LANta, a bus system serving Lehigh and Northampton counties, and is served by the 106, 216, 217, and 220 Routes. The Blue Line, LANta's Bus Rapid Transit service, serves Palmer Township at three stops: Stones Crossing, Greenwood, and 25th Street.

The Easton Intermodal Transportation Center in nearby Easton serves as a hub for LANTA buses. NJ Transit provides bus service from Center Square in Easton to Phillipsburg and Pohatcong in New Jersey along the 890 and 891 routes. Greyhound Lines provides intercity bus service to Easton, stopping at the Easton Intermodal Transportation Center. Trans-Bridge Lines provides regular bus service to New York City.

=== Rail ===
The last passenger rail service in the region, which was provided by SEPTA, ceased operating in 1979. In September 2020, Amtrak, as part of its expansion plan, proposed restoring rail service between Allentown and New York City by 2035. This largely single-track Amtrak route has been opposed by Norfolk Southern Railway, which acquired the Lehigh Line as part of its purchase of federally-founded Conrail in 1999.

In November 2008, the Lehigh Valley Economic Development Corporation (LVEDC) and both Lehigh and Northampton counties commissioned a study, exploring restoration of the Black Diamond service, which ran until 1961, which would likely entail extending New Jersey Transit's Raritan Valley Line to nearby Easton.

== Demographics ==
Historical population
Census	Pop.	Note	%±
1920	1,465		—
1930	2,355		60.8%
1940	2,567		9.0%
1950	4,086		59.2%
1960	8,823		115.9%
1970	12,684		43.8%
1980	13,926		9.8%
1990	14,965		7.5%
2000	16,809		12.3%
2010	20,691		23.1%
2020	22,317		7.9%
2016 (est.)	21,469		3.8%
U.S. Decennial Census

As of the 2020 census, there were 22,317 people, 8,854 households, and 9,087 housing units. The population density was 2,176.1 inhabitants per square mile (840.2/km^{2}). The racial makeup of the township was 76.2 White alone, 3.9% African American, 0.06% Native American, 5.9% Asian, 0.02% Pacific Islander, 5.3% from other races, and 8.7% from two or more races. Hispanic or Latino of any race were 15% of the population.

There were 8,854 households, out of which 29.2% had children under the age of 18 living with them, 60.3% were married couples living together, 21.2% had a female householder with no husband present, and 6.8% were non-families. 23.2% of all households were made up of individuals, and 38.1% had someone living alone who was 65 years of age or older. The average household size was 2.49.

In the township, the population was spread out, with 18.6% under the age of 18, 58.8% from 18 to 64, and 22.6% who were 65 years of age or older. The median age was 46.7 years. For every 100 females there were 93.4 males. For every 100 females age 18 and over, there were 88.1 males. The per capita income in the township was $54,543, and the median household income for a family was $109,682. Males had a median income of $44,014 versus $30,675 for females. The per capita income for the township was $25,722. About 2.6% of families and 3.7% of the population were below the poverty line, including 3.4% of those under age 18 and 6.3% of those age 65 or over.

== Economy ==
A lack of water during the early days of Palmer Township limited the amount of farming that could be done, and industry was limited mainly to the Bushkill Creek waterways, where some form of power was available. Residents had to get water from hand dug wells because it was too difficult to find a source of water close to the surface of the ground. Other industries began to arise in the late 19th and early 20th centuries, including some iron ore excavation in the Fairview Knolls area and the cement industry near the Tatamy area; also at this time, the Taylor Wharton and Treadwell Engineering were established in Palmer Township to manufacture equipment mainly for railroad use. Most famously, Binney and Smith, the predecessor of Crayola, founded their famous crayons in their Palmer Township factory along the Bushkill Creek.

Farming techniques gradually advanced in the area until by the late 1960s; almost 50 percent of the township was then farmland. The township saw new businesses in the mid 1960s, including ITT Inc. in 1964 and Acopian Corp., in 1965.

=== Media ===
The Greater Easton area's daily newspaper is The Express-Times. The Morning Call, based in Allentown, also is read in the area. Palmer Township is part of the Philadelphia media market but also receives numerous radio and television channels from New York City and the smaller Scranton-Wilkes-Barre media market to the northwest.

Two television stations are based in the Greater Easton area: PBS affiliate WLVT Channel 39 in Bethlehem and independent station WFMZ Channel 69 in Allentown.

Five radio stations are based in the Greater Easton area: WEEX, a sports radio station broadcasting at 1230 AM, WODE-FM "The Hawk", a classic rock station broadcasting at 99.9 FM, WCTO "Cat Country 96", a country music station broadcasting on 96.1 FM, WJRH, a Lafayette College college radio station broadcasting at 104.9 FM, and WEST "Loud Radio", a rhythmic contemporary radio station broadcasting at 99.5 FM. WDIY-FM, a National Public Radio affiliate located in Bethlehem, maintains a translator in Easton and broadcasts at 93.9 FM.

== Education ==
The Easton Area School District serves public school students from Palmer Township along with those from Easton, Forks Township, Martins Creek to the north.

The school district has seven elementary schools: Cheston, Forks, March, Palmer, Paxinosa, Shawnee, and Tracy for grades K-5, Easton Area Middle School Campus in Forks Township for grades 6–8, and Easton Area High School in Easton for grades 9–12. Total student enrollment in the school district is approximately 8,289 students in all grades as of 2020–21.

Easton Area High School is known for its long-standing athletic rivalry with Phillipsburg High School in neighboring Phillipsburg, New Jersey. The two teams play an annual football game on Thanksgiving Day that is considered one of the largest and longest-standing rivalries in American high school football. In 2006, the rivalry marked its 100th anniversary. The game, which was broadcast on ESPN, was won by Easton. In 2009, Easton was the location of the Gatorade REPLAY Game in which the 1993 teams from the Easton vs. Phillipsburg game met again following their 7–7 tie in 1993. The REPLAY Game was won by Phillipsburg, 27–12.

Easton Area High School competes in the Eastern Pennsylvania Conference, which includes the 12 largest high schools in the Lehigh Valley and Poconos and is one of the nation's most elite high school athletic conferences. Easton holds the third-most conference championships in all sports, behind only Parkland High School and Emmaus High School. Easton is also home to Notre Dame High School, a Catholic school.

== Infrastructure ==
When Palmer's major roadway system first started to develop in the 18th century, dictated largely by the trails leading from Easton to outlying communities. William Penn Highway, the first road built in Palmer in around 1755, led from Easton to Bethlehem. Freemansburg Avenue leads from Easton to Freemansburg; Old Nazareth Road leads from Easton to Nazareth; Tatamy Road leads from Easton to Tatamy; and Hecktown Road and the Newburg Pike leads from Seipsville to Hecktown and Newburg. Greenwood Avenue, which runs between Freemansburg Avenue and William Penn Highway, was opened in the 1960s. At the time, township supervisor H. Robert Daws said, "The opening of this north-south artery in the center of the township benefits not only the township, but the whole area."

== Notable people ==
- Larry Holmes, also known as the "Easton Assassin," former boxing's heavyweight champion of the world
- Mulgrew Miller, former jazz musician
