= Chickentown, Pennsylvania =

Unincorporated community in Pennsylvania, US

- Unincorporated community
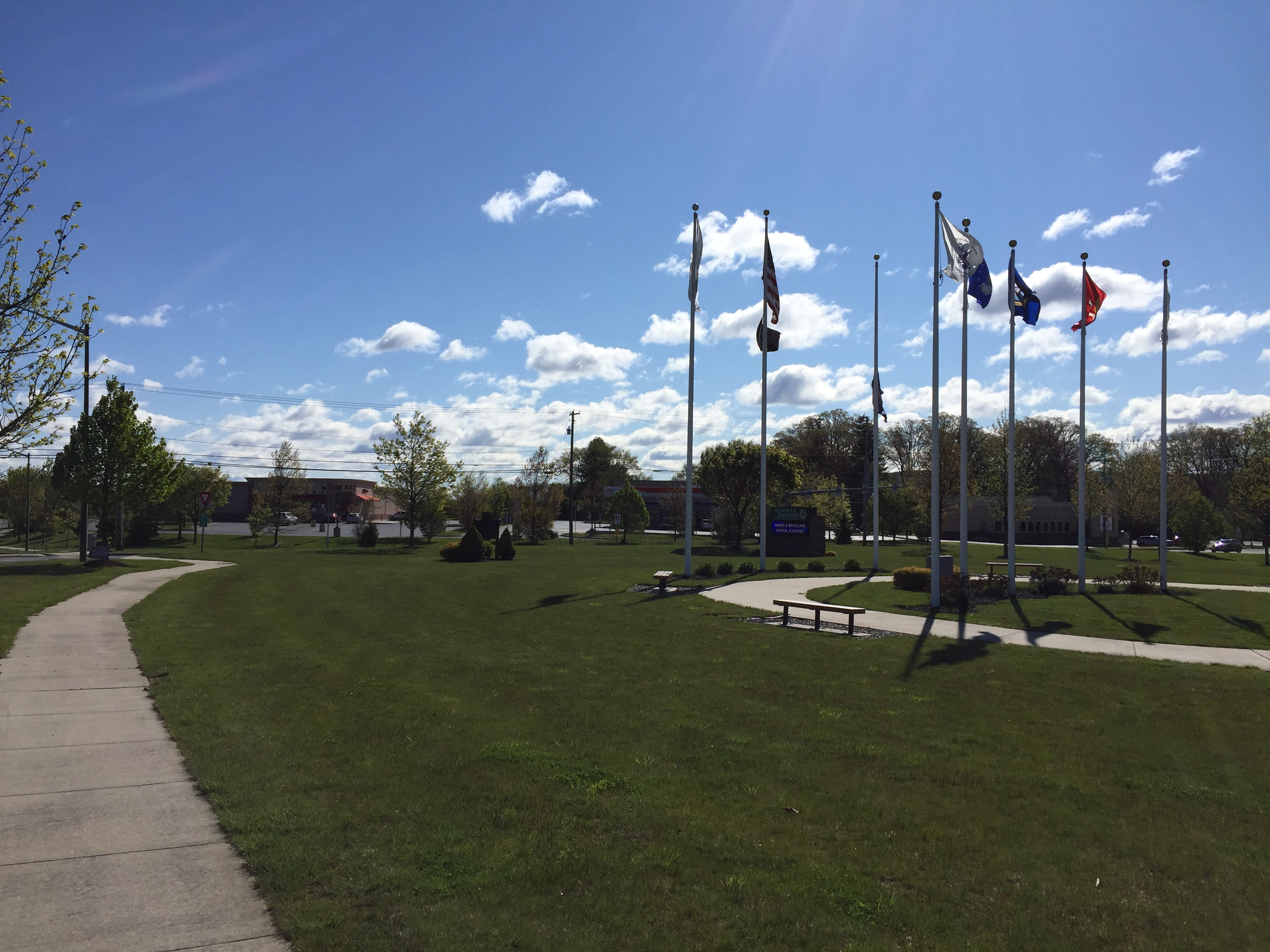
- The junction of Hanoverville Road and Pennsylvania Route 512 in Chickentown

- Location within Pennsylvania
- Coordinates: 40°40′52″N 75°23′20″W
- Country: United States
- State: Pennsylvania
- County: Northampton
- Township: Hanover
- Elevation: 390 ft (120 m)

Population
  - Metro: 865,310 (US: 68th)
- Time zone: UTC-5 (Eastern (EST))
  - Summer (DST): UTC-4 (EDT)
- Area codes: 610 and 484
- GNIS feature ID: 1210868

Chickentown is an unincorporated community in Northampton County, Pennsylvania. Chickentown is located at the junction of Hanoverville Road and Pennsylvania Route 512. It is part of the Lehigh Valley metropolitan area.

== History ==
The name Chickentown originated from the several poultry farms previously located in the area, especially those on nearby Jacksonville Road, which was previously called Chickentown Road because of the large number of farms located on it. However, this name fell into obscurity sometime before the turn of the 21st century as the area became more residential.
