= Northampton County, Pennsylvania =

County in Pennsylvania, United States

- County
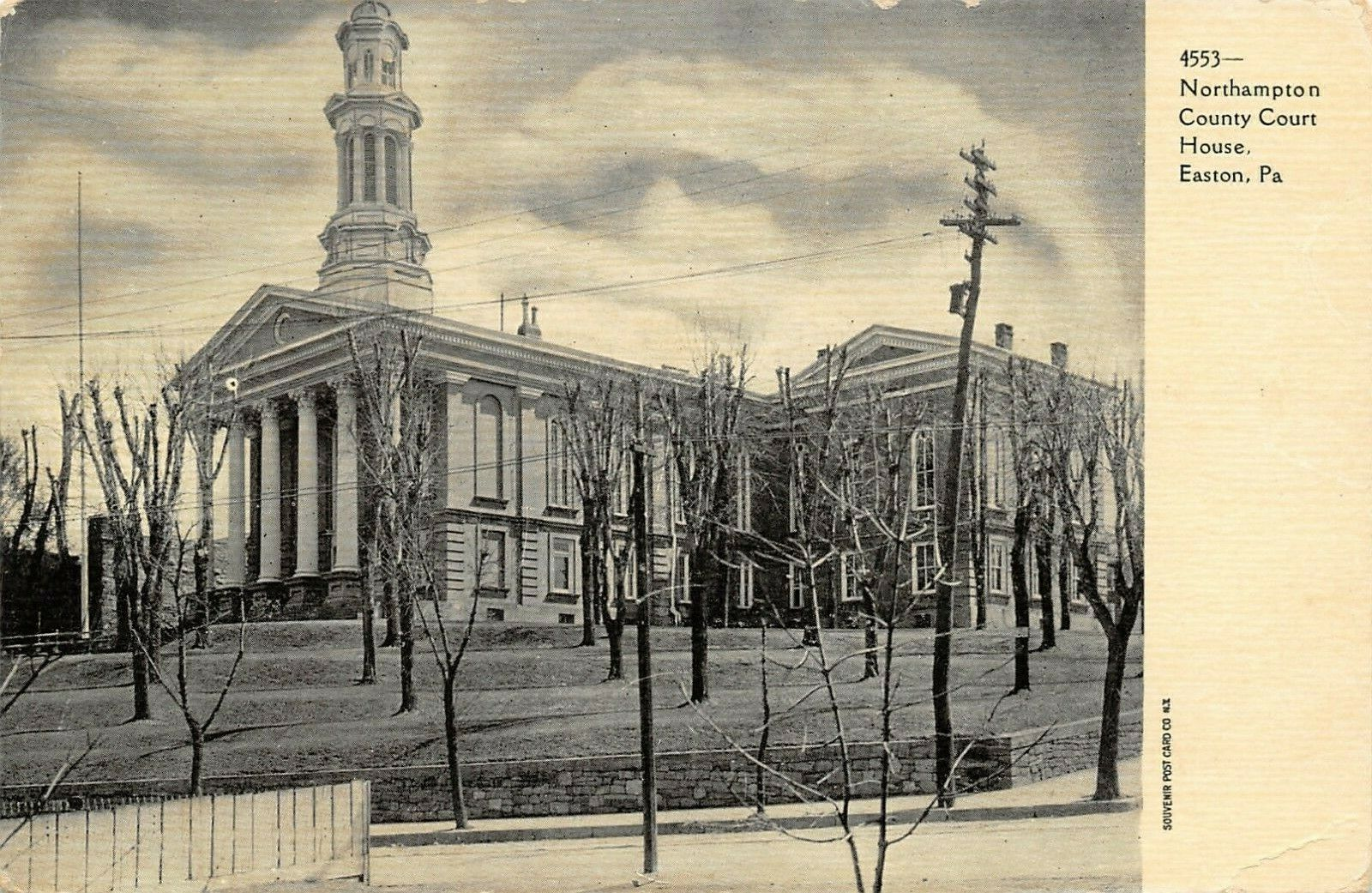
- A 1905 illustration of Northampton County Courthouse in Easton

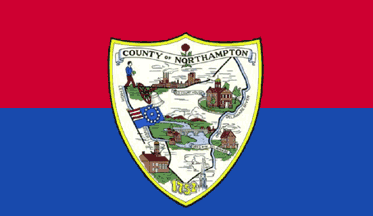
- Flag Seal

- Location within the U.S. state of Pennsylvania
- Coordinates: 40°45′N 75°19′W
- Country: United States
- State: Pennsylvania
- Founded: March 11, 1752
- Named for: Northamptonshire, England
- Seat: Easton
- Largest city: Bethlehem

Area
  - Total: 377 sq mi (980 km^{2})
  - Land: 370 sq mi (960 km^{2})
  - Water: 7.7 sq mi (20 km^{2}) 2.0%

Population (2020)
  - Total: 312,951
  - Estimate (2025): 324,411 ▲
  - Density: 830/sq mi (320/km^{2})
- Time zone: UTC−5 (Eastern)
  - Summer (DST): UTC−4 (EDT)
- Congressional district: 7th
- Website: www.northamptoncounty.org

Northampton County is a county in the Commonwealth of Pennsylvania, United States. As of the 2020 census, the population was 312,951. Its county seat is Easton. The county was formed in 1752 from parts of Bucks County. Its namesake was the county of Northamptonshire in England, and the county seat of Easton was named for Easton Neston, a country house in Northamptonshire.

Northampton County and Lehigh County to its west combine to form the eastern Pennsylvania region known as the Lehigh Valley; Lehigh County, with a population of 374,557 as of the 2020 U.S. census, is the more highly populated of the two counties. Both counties are part of the Philadelphia media market, the fifth-largest in the nation.

Northampton County has historically been a national leader in heavy manufacturing, especially of cement, steel, and other industrial products. Atlas Portland Cement Company, the world's largest cement manufacturer from 1895 until 1982, was based in Northampton in the county. Bethlehem Steel, the world's second-largest manufacturer of steel for most of the 20th century, was based in Bethlehem, the county's most populous city, prior to its dissolution in 2003.

Northampton County borders Carbon County and the Poconos to its north, Lehigh County to its west, Bucks County to its south, and the Delaware River and New Jersey to its east. The Lehigh River, a 109-mile-long (175 km) tributary of the Delaware River, flows through the county.

== Geography ==
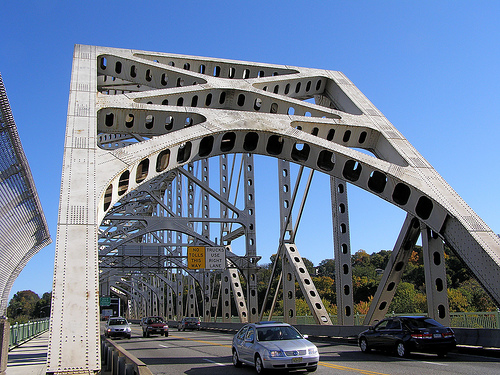
The Easton–Phillipsburg Toll Bridge, which connects Easton in Northampton County with Phillipsburg in northwestern New Jersey in the Lehigh Valley, in October 2009

According to the U.S. Census Bureau, the county has a total area of 377 square miles (980 km^{2}), of which 370 square miles (960 km^{2}) is land and 7.7 square miles (20 km^{2}) (2.0%) is water. The climate is humid continental (mostly Dfa with a little Dfb in higher northern areas) and the hardiness zone is 7a except in the northern tier where it is 6b. Average monthly temperatures in downtown Bethlehem average from 29.1 °F in January to 74.1 °F in July, while in Wind Gap, they average from 27.0 °F in January to 71.7 °F in July. Both the Lehigh and Delaware rivers flow through the county. Kittatinny Ridge is to its north. South Mountain is to its south. Paxinosa Mountains are to its east.

=== Adjacent counties ===
- Monroe County (north)
- Warren County, New Jersey (east)
- Bucks County (south)
- Lehigh County (west)
- Carbon County (northwest)

=== National protected areas ===
- Delaware Water Gap National Recreation Area (part)
- Middle Delaware National Scenic River (part)

== Demographics ==
Historical population
| Census | Pop. | Note | %± |
|---|---|---|---|
| 1790 | 24,220 | | — |
| 1800 | 30,062 | | 24.1% |
| 1810 | 38,145 | | 26.9% |
| 1820 | 31,765 | | −16.7% |
| 1830 | 39,482 | | 24.3% |
| 1840 | 40,996 | | 3.8% |
| 1850 | 40,235 | | −1.9% |
| 1860 | 47,904 | | 19.1% |
| 1870 | 61,432 | | 28.2% |
| 1880 | 70,312 | | 14.5% |
| 1890 | 84,220 | | 19.8% |
| 1900 | 99,687 | | 18.4% |
| 1910 | 127,667 | | 28.1% |
| 1920 | 153,506 | | 20.2% |
| 1930 | 169,304 | | 10.3% |
| 1940 | 168,959 | | −0.2% |
| 1950 | 185,243 | | 9.6% |
| 1960 | 201,412 | | 8.7% |
| 1970 | 214,368 | | 6.4% |
| 1980 | 225,418 | | 5.2% |
| 1990 | 247,105 | | 9.6% |
| 2000 | 267,066 | | 8.1% |
| 2010 | 297,735 | | 11.5% |
| 2020 | 312,951 | | 5.1% |
| 2025 (est.) | 324,411 | ▲ | 3.7% |
U.S. Decennial Census; 1790-1960 1900-1990; 1990-2000 2010-2019

=== Racial and ethnic composition ===
Northampton County, Pennsylvania – Racial and ethnic composition Note: the US Census treats Hispanic/Latino as an ethnic category. This table excludes Latinos from the racial categories and assigns them to a separate category. Hispanics/Latinos may be of any race.
| Race / Ethnicity (NH = Non-Hispanic) | Pop 1980 | Pop 1990 | Pop 2000 | Pop 2010 | Pop 2020 | % 1980 | % 1990 | % 2000 | % 2010 | % 2020 |
|---|---|---|---|---|---|---|---|---|---|---|
| White alone (NH) | 212,821 | 227,521 | 235,666 | 241,163 | 228,373 | 94.41% | 92.07% | 88.24% | 81.00% | 72.97% |
| Black or African American alone (NH) | 3,875 | 4,968 | 6,886 | 13,207 | 17,429 | 1.72% | 2.01% | 2.58% | 4.44% | 5.57% |
| Native American or Alaska Native alone (NH) | 112 | 187 | 293 | 329 | 251 | 0.05% | 0.08% | 0.11% | 0.11% | 0.08% |
| Asian alone (NH) | 1,171 | 2,638 | 3,610 | 7,131 | 9,892 | 0.52% | 1.07% | 1.35% | 2.40% | 3.16% |
| Native Hawaiian or Pacific Islander alone (NH) | x | x | 50 | 74 | 75 | x | x | 0.02% | 0.02% | 0.02% |
| Other race alone (NH) | 380 | 200 | 277 | 422 | 1,647 | 0.17% | 0.08% | 0.10% | 0.14% | 0.53% |
| Mixed race or Multiracial (NH) | x | x | 2,416 | 4,230 | 10,687 | x | x | 0.90% | 1.42% | 3.41% |
| Hispanic or Latino (any race) | 7,059 | 11,591 | 17,868 | 31,179 | 44,597 | 3.13% | 4.69% | 6.69% | 10.47% | 14.25% |
| Total | 225,418 | 247,105 | 267,066 | 297,735 | 312,951 | 100.00% | 100.00% | 100.00% | 100.00% | 100.00% |

=== 2020 census ===
As of the 2020 census, the county had a population of 312,951, reflecting growth of 5.1% over 2010. The median age was 42.6 years, 19.6% of residents were under the age of 18, and 19.9% were 65 years of age or older; for every 100 females there were 95.6 males, and for every 100 females age 18 and over there were 93.3 males age 18 and over.

The racial makeup of the county was 76.2% White, 6.2% Black or African American, 0.3% American Indian and Alaska Native, 3.2% Asian, <0.1% Native Hawaiian and Pacific Islander, 5.9% from some other race, and 8.2% from two or more races; Hispanic or Latino residents of any race comprised 14.3% of the population.

83.1% of residents lived in urban areas, while 16.9% lived in rural areas.

There were 121,015 households in the county, of which 27.9% had children under the age of 18 living in them. Of all households, 49.8% were married-couple households, 17.0% were households with a male householder and no spouse or partner present, and 25.7% were households with a female householder and no spouse or partner present. About 26.3% of all households were made up of individuals and 12.3% had someone living alone who was 65 years of age or older.

There were 127,584 housing units, of which 5.1% were vacant. Among occupied housing units, 70.4% were owner-occupied and 29.6% were renter-occupied. The homeowner vacancy rate was 1.0% and the rental vacancy rate was 5.3%.

=== 2010 census ===
As of the 2010 census, the county was 81.0% White Non-Hispanic, 5.0% Black or African American, 0.2% Native American or Alaskan Native, 2.4% Asian, 0.0% Native Hawaiian, 2.2% were two or more races, and 3.8% were some other race. 10.5% of the population were of Hispanic or Latino ancestry.

== Economy ==
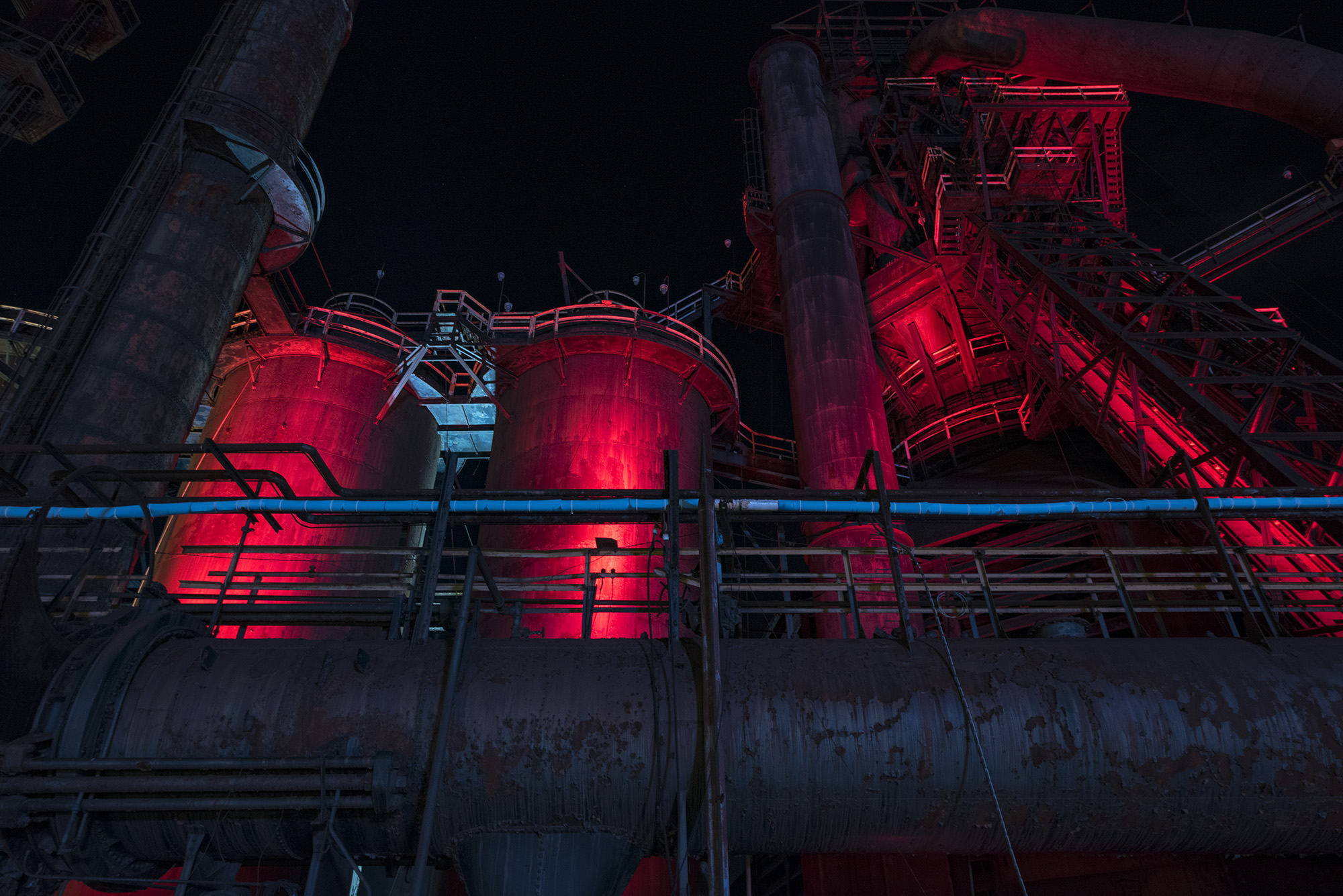
The still preserved but now dormant steel stacks of Bethlehem Steel at the company's manufacturing headquarters in Bethlehem. In 2007, much of the former headquarters was acquired by Sands Bethworks, a casino later sold and renamed Wind Creek Bethlehem.

Northampton County is part of the larger Lehigh Valley metropolitan region, which was historically a global leader in heavy manufacturing. As of 2023, the Lehigh Valley's gross domestic product (GDP) was $55.7 billion, led by its manufacturing sector, which comprised $9 billion, or 16 percent.

The county served as the global headquarters of Bethlehem Steel, founded in 1857 and based in Bethlehem, which was the nation's second-largest steel manufacturer after U.S. Steel for most of the 20th century. In 1982, Bethlehem Steel reported an unexpected loss of US$1.5 billion, and responded by promptly shutting down much of its operations. In 2001, the company declared bankruptcy, and it was dissolved in 2003. The plight of Bethlehem Steel is often cited as a prominent example of the impact of deindustrialization associated with the Rust Belt regions of the U.S. during the late 20th century.

The county is also home to the global headquarters of C. F. Martin & Company, based in Nazareth, which manufacturers Martin Guitars, used by Johnny Cash, Elvis Presley, Bob Dylan, Hank Williams, Neil Young, John Lennon, Willie Nelson, Kurt Cobain, Eric Clapton, John Mayer, and other prominent guitarists.

== Government ==
Northampton is one of the seven counties in Pennsylvania which has adopted a home rule charter. Voters elect a county executive, a nine-person county council, a county controller, and a county district attorney. The executive, controller, district attorney, and five of the nine council members are elected at large by all voters in the county. The other four members of the county council are elected from single-member districts, which they represent. This weighted structure of county government favors the majority of voters. The county's row officers are nominated by the county executive and approved by county council.

== Politics ==
United States presidential election results for Northampton County, Pennsylvania
| Year | Republican | | Democratic | | Third party(ies) | |
| Year | No. | % | No. | % | No. | % |
|---|---|---|---|---|---|---|
| 1880 | 5,961 | 37.90% | 9,653 | 61.37% | 114 | 0.72% |
| 1884 | 6,327 | 39.44% | 9,491 | 59.16% | 224 | 1.40% |
| 1888 | 6,785 | 39.67% | 10,027 | 58.63% | 291 | 1.70% |
| 1892 | 6,892 | 39.21% | 10,320 | 58.71% | 367 | 2.09% |
| 1896 | 9,762 | 47.59% | 10,032 | 48.91% | 717 | 3.50% |
| 1900 | 9,849 | 45.14% | 11,412 | 52.31% | 556 | 2.55% |
| 1904 | 11,039 | 51.21% | 9,914 | 45.99% | 604 | 2.80% |
| 1908 | 10,857 | 46.91% | 11,365 | 49.10% | 923 | 3.99% |
| 1912 | 3,893 | 17.91% | 10,325 | 47.50% | 7,518 | 34.59% |
| 1916 | 9,610 | 44.37% | 11,000 | 50.78% | 1,050 | 4.85% |
| 1920 | 14,227 | 58.78% | 9,086 | 37.54% | 891 | 3.68% |
| 1924 | 20,459 | 58.42% | 11,459 | 32.72% | 3,104 | 8.86% |
| 1928 | 37,403 | 71.14% | 14,768 | 28.09% | 404 | 0.77% |
| 1932 | 20,779 | 45.04% | 24,009 | 52.04% | 1,345 | 2.92% |
| 1936 | 22,827 | 37.34% | 36,871 | 60.31% | 1,438 | 2.35% |
| 1940 | 25,385 | 43.06% | 33,304 | 56.49% | 269 | 0.46% |
| 1944 | 26,643 | 44.76% | 32,584 | 54.75% | 292 | 0.49% |
| 1948 | 27,030 | 43.95% | 33,209 | 53.99% | 1,265 | 2.06% |
| 1952 | 39,131 | 50.99% | 36,993 | 48.21% | 614 | 0.80% |
| 1956 | 43,375 | 55.83% | 33,749 | 43.44% | 573 | 0.74% |
| 1960 | 40,683 | 49.43% | 41,552 | 50.48% | 71 | 0.09% |
| 1964 | 21,048 | 26.15% | 58,818 | 73.08% | 619 | 0.77% |
| 1968 | 32,033 | 41.00% | 42,554 | 54.47% | 3,543 | 4.53% |
| 1972 | 41,822 | 56.30% | 32,335 | 43.53% | 124 | 0.17% |
| 1976 | 32,926 | 42.78% | 42,514 | 55.24% | 1,521 | 1.98% |
| 1980 | 35,787 | 47.07% | 31,920 | 41.98% | 8,330 | 10.96% |
| 1984 | 44,648 | 53.49% | 37,979 | 45.50% | 840 | 1.01% |
| 1988 | 42,748 | 51.52% | 39,264 | 47.32% | 966 | 1.16% |
| 1992 | 34,429 | 35.30% | 42,203 | 43.27% | 20,893 | 21.42% |
| 1996 | 35,726 | 39.26% | 43,959 | 48.31% | 11,317 | 12.44% |
| 2000 | 47,396 | 45.27% | 53,097 | 50.72% | 4,197 | 4.01% |
| 2004 | 62,102 | 48.96% | 63,446 | 50.02% | 1,301 | 1.03% |
| 2008 | 58,551 | 43.07% | 75,255 | 55.35% | 2,148 | 1.58% |
| 2012 | 61,446 | 46.89% | 67,606 | 51.59% | 1,992 | 1.52% |
| 2016 | 71,736 | 49.62% | 66,272 | 45.84% | 6,558 | 4.54% |
| 2020 | 83,854 | 48.92% | 85,087 | 49.64% | 2,458 | 1.43% |
| 2024 | 89,817 | 50.26% | 86,655 | 48.49% | 2,223 | 1.24% |

United States Senate election results for Northampton County, Pennsylvania1
| Year | Republican | | Democratic | | Third party(ies) | |
| Year | No. | % | No. | % | No. | % |
|---|---|---|---|---|---|---|
| 1994 | 32,590 | 49.40% | 30,713 | 46.56% | 2,664 | 4.04% |
| 2000 | 53,853 | 54.57% | 42,965 | 43.54% | 1,868 | 1.89% |
| 2006 | 34,644 | 41.71% | 48,419 | 58.29% | 0 | 0.00% |
| 2012 | 56,268 | 44.55% | 68,203 | 54.00% | 1,821 | 1.44% |
| 2018 | 50,385 | 43.35% | 62,275 | 53.58% | 3,566 | 3.07% |
| 2024 | 85,787 | 49.13% | 84,762 | 48.54% | 4,066 | 2.33% |

United States Senate election results for Northampton County, Pennsylvania3
| Year | Republican | | Democratic | | Third party(ies) | |
| Year | No. | % | No. | % | No. | % |
|---|---|---|---|---|---|---|
| 1992 | 41,455 | 44.45% | 48,641 | 52.16% | 3,162 | 3.39% |
| 1998 | 39,679 | 62.12% | 21,808 | 34.14% | 2,388 | 3.74% |
| 2004 | 64,379 | 53.83% | 50,551 | 42.27% | 4,663 | 3.90% |
| 2010 | 44,209 | 52.30% | 40,321 | 47.70% | 0 | 0.00% |
| 2016 | 72,172 | 51.59% | 64,151 | 45.86% | 3,566 | 2.55% |
| 2022 | 59,860 | 46.05% | 66,565 | 51.21% | 3,562 | 2.74% |

Pennsylvania Gubernatorial election results for Northampton County
| Year | Republican | | Democratic | | Third party(ies) | |
| Year | No. | % | No. | % | No. | % |
|---|---|---|---|---|---|---|
| 1970 | 19,017 | 31.89% | 39,390 | 66.04% | 1,235 | 2.07% |
| 1974 | 21,690 | 39.38% | 32,622 | 59.22% | 772 | 1.40% |
| 1978 | 31,024 | 54.73% | 24,909 | 43.95% | 749 | 1.32% |
| 1982 | 31,252 | 51.25% | 29,038 | 47.62% | 685 | 1.12% |
| 1986 | 27,723 | 47.94% | 29,482 | 50.98% | 628 | 1.09% |
| 1990 | 18,253 | 31.96% | 38,862 | 68.04% | 0 | 0.00% |
| 1994 | 33,704 | 50.47% | 26,641 | 39.90% | 6,432 | 9.63% |
| 1998 | 42,352 | 64.15% | 20,461 | 30.99% | 3,204 | 4.85% |
| 2002 | 28,228 | 38.82% | 42,554 | 58.52% | 1,934 | 2.66% |
| 2006 | 30,081 | 36.20% | 53,007 | 63.80% | 0 | 0.00% |
| 2010 | 45,986 | 54.19% | 38,871 | 45.81% | 0 | 0.00% |
| 2014 | 33,354 | 45.01% | 40,753 | 54.99% | 0 | 0.00% |
| 2018 | 47,527 | 41.28% | 65,749 | 57.11% | 1,846 | 1.60% |
| 2022 | 54,928 | 42.28% | 72,269 | 55.63% | 2,704 | 2.08% |

As of January 8, 2024, there were 219,719 registered voters in Northampton County

- Democratic: 95,780 (43.59%)
- Republican: 80,828 (36.79%)
- No affiliation: 32,480 (14.78%)
- Other parties: 10,631 (4.84%)

Northampton County is considered one of Pennsylvania's "swing counties," with statewide winners carrying it in most cases. As of 2024, the last presidential election where Northampton County did not back the statewide winner was in 1948.

In the 2024 U.S. Senate election in Pennsylvania, Republican Dave McCormick won the election and Northampton County, while losing Erie County, Pennsylvania. The county also closely mirrored the 2024 U.S. presidential election in Pennsylvania, which was won by Republican Donald Trump (50.2% to 48.5%), compared to Trump winning Northampton County 50.4% to 48.62%.

=== Voting machine problems ===
==== 2019 election ====
In November 2019, municipal elections were in Pennsylvania in November 2019, and the county's result tabulations were plagued with problems caused by newly purchased voting machines, known as ExpressVoteXL, which were manufactured and sold to the county by Election Systems & Software (ES&S), an Omaha, Nebraska-based company, as representing a luxury one-stop voting system.

According to The New York Times and other media, a few minutes after polls closed in the county in 2019, panic began to spread through the county's election offices as it became evident that vote totals in one judge's race showed one candidate, Abe Kassis, a Democrat, had received just 164 votes out of 55,000 ballots across more than the 100 precincts in the county; Some precinct machines reported zero votes for him.

The ES&S voting system, which is used in other Pennsylvania jurisdictions, features a touch screen with a paper ballot backup. County officials ultimately calculated results by counting paper ballots, which showed Kassis actually won the election by 1,054 votes, according to unofficial results that were announced on November 6. The election results were later certified following a canvass and audit, and no challenges to the results were filed.

==== 2023 election ====
On November 7, 2023, ExpressVoteXL machines again malfunctioned in calculating votes for Superior Court of Pennsylvania judges with the machines switching "yes" and "no" votes on the summary display of votes on whether the judges should be retained. The county's director of administration, Charles Dertinger, attributed the problem to the summary display and not the actual ballots.

=== County executives ===
Northampton County executives
| Name | Party | Term start | Term end |
|---|---|---|---|
| Glenn F. Reibman | Democratic | 1998 | 2006 |
| John Stoffa | Democratic | 2006 | 2014 |
| John Brown | Republican | 2014 | 2018 |
| Lamont McClure | Democratic | 2018 | 2026 |
| Tara Zrinski | Democratic | 2026 | incumbent |

=== State representatives ===
- Milou Mackenzie, Republican, 131st district
- Steve Samuelson, Democrat, 135th district
- Robert L. Freeman, Democrat, 136th district
- Joe Emrick, Republican, 137th district
- Ann Flood, Republican, 138th district
- Zach Mako, Republican, 183rd district

=== State senators ===
- Nick Miller, Democrat, 14th district
- Lisa Boscola, Democrat, 18th district

=== United States House of Representatives ===
- Ryan Mackenzie, Republican, 7th district

=== United States Senate ===
- Dave McCormick, Republican
- John Fetterman, Democrat

== Education ==
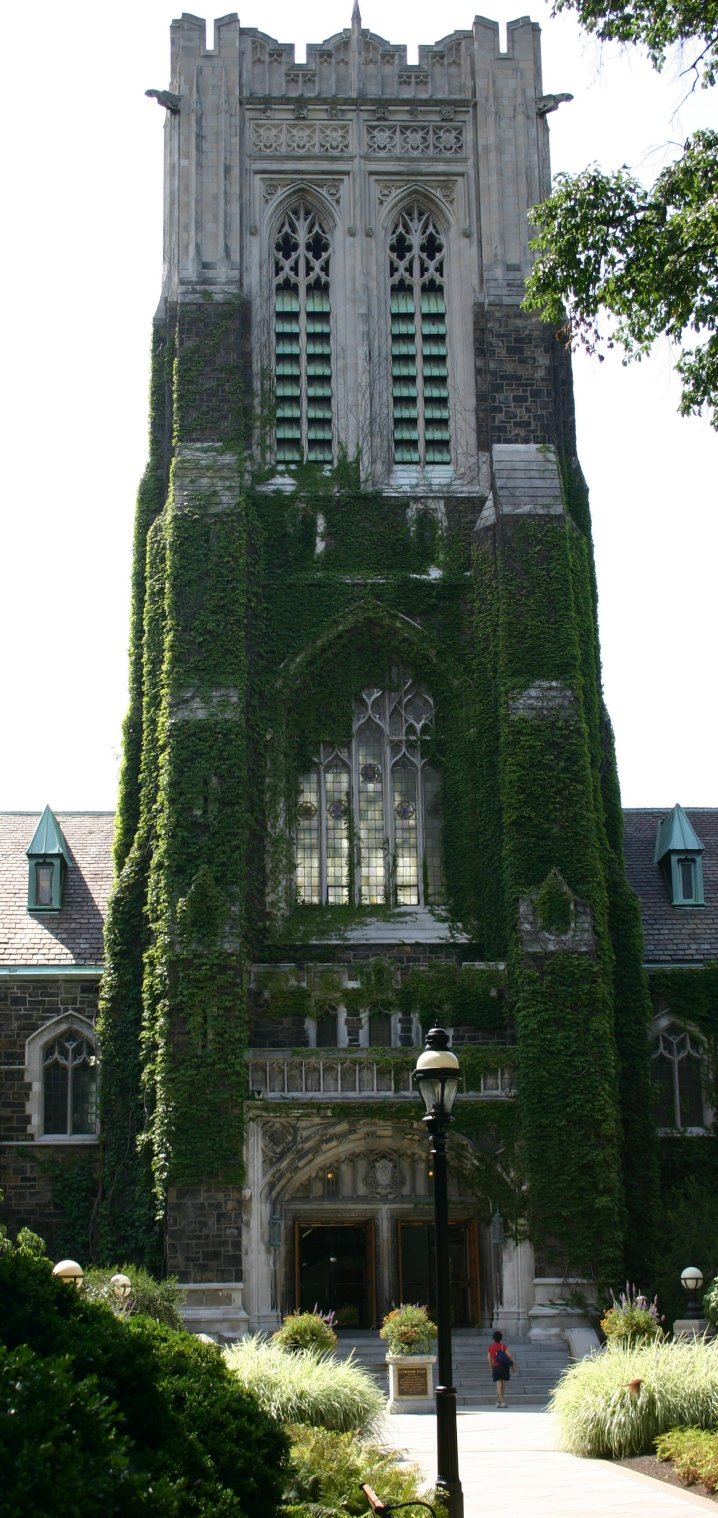
The Alumni Memorial Building at Lehigh University in Bethlehem in August 2005

=== Colleges and universities ===
- Lafayette College, Easton
- Lehigh University, Bethlehem
- Moravian University, Bethlehem
- Northampton County Area Community College, Bethlehem Township
- Respect Graduate School, Bethlehem

=== Public school districts ===
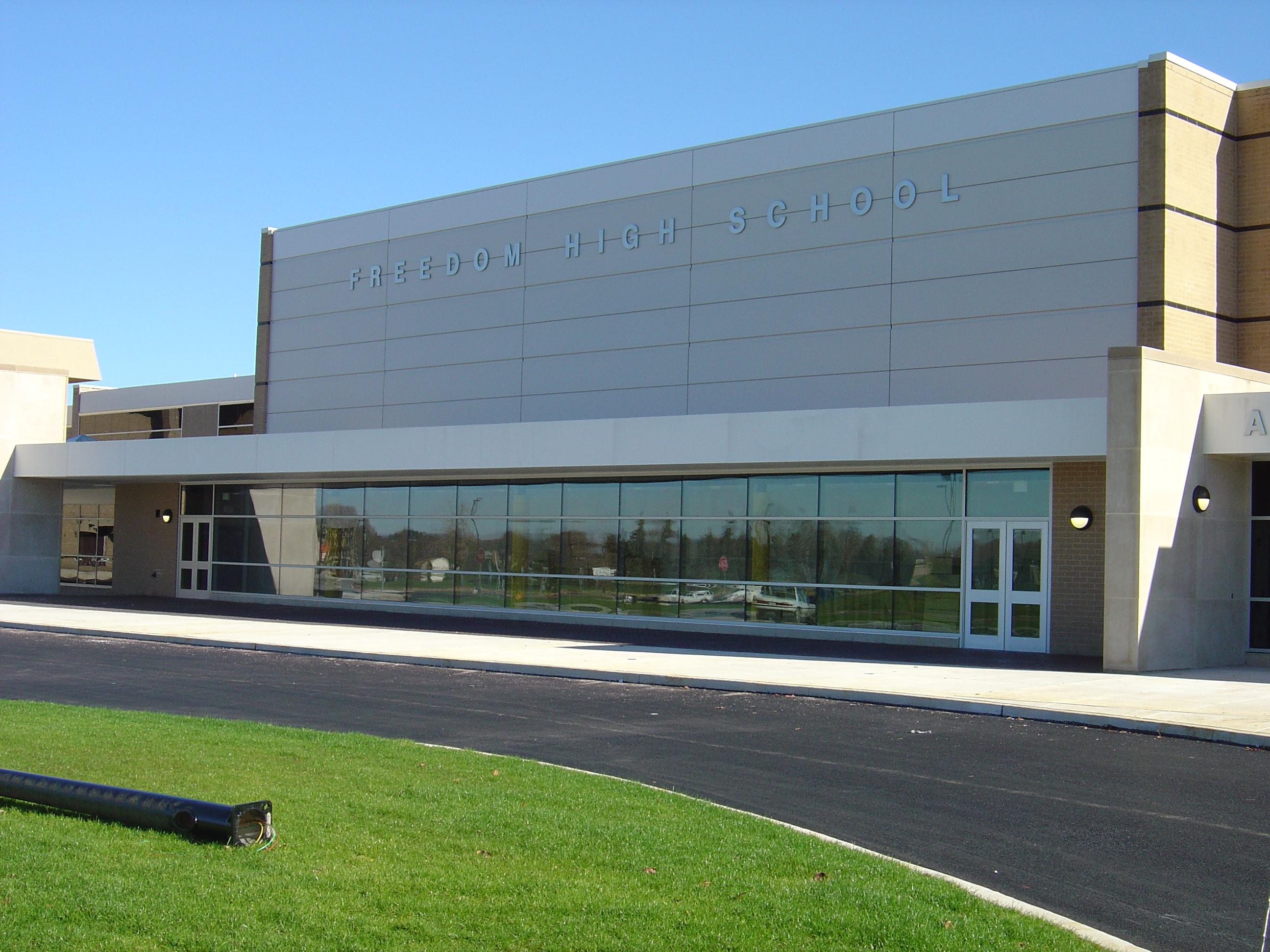
Freedom High School, one of two large public high schools in the Bethlehem Area School District, in November 2008

School districts include:

- Bangor Area School District
  - Bangor Area High School, Bangor
- Bethlehem Area School District
  - Freedom High School, Bethlehem Township
  - Liberty High School, Bethlehem
- Catasauqua Area School District
  - Catasauqua High School, Northampton
- Easton Area School District
  - Easton Area High School, Easton
- Nazareth Area School District
  - Nazareth Area High School, Nazareth
- Northampton Area School District
  - Northampton Area High School, Northampton
- Northern Lehigh School District
- Pen Argyl Area School District
  - Pen Argyl Area High School, Pen Argyl
- Saucon Valley School District
  - Saucon Valley High School, Hellertown
- Wilson Area School District
  - Wilson Area High School, Easton

=== Public charter schools ===
- Lehigh Valley Charter High School for the Arts, Bethlehem

=== Private high schools ===
- Bethlehem Catholic High School, Bethlehem
- Moravian Academy, Bethlehem
- Notre Dame High School, Easton

== Transportation ==
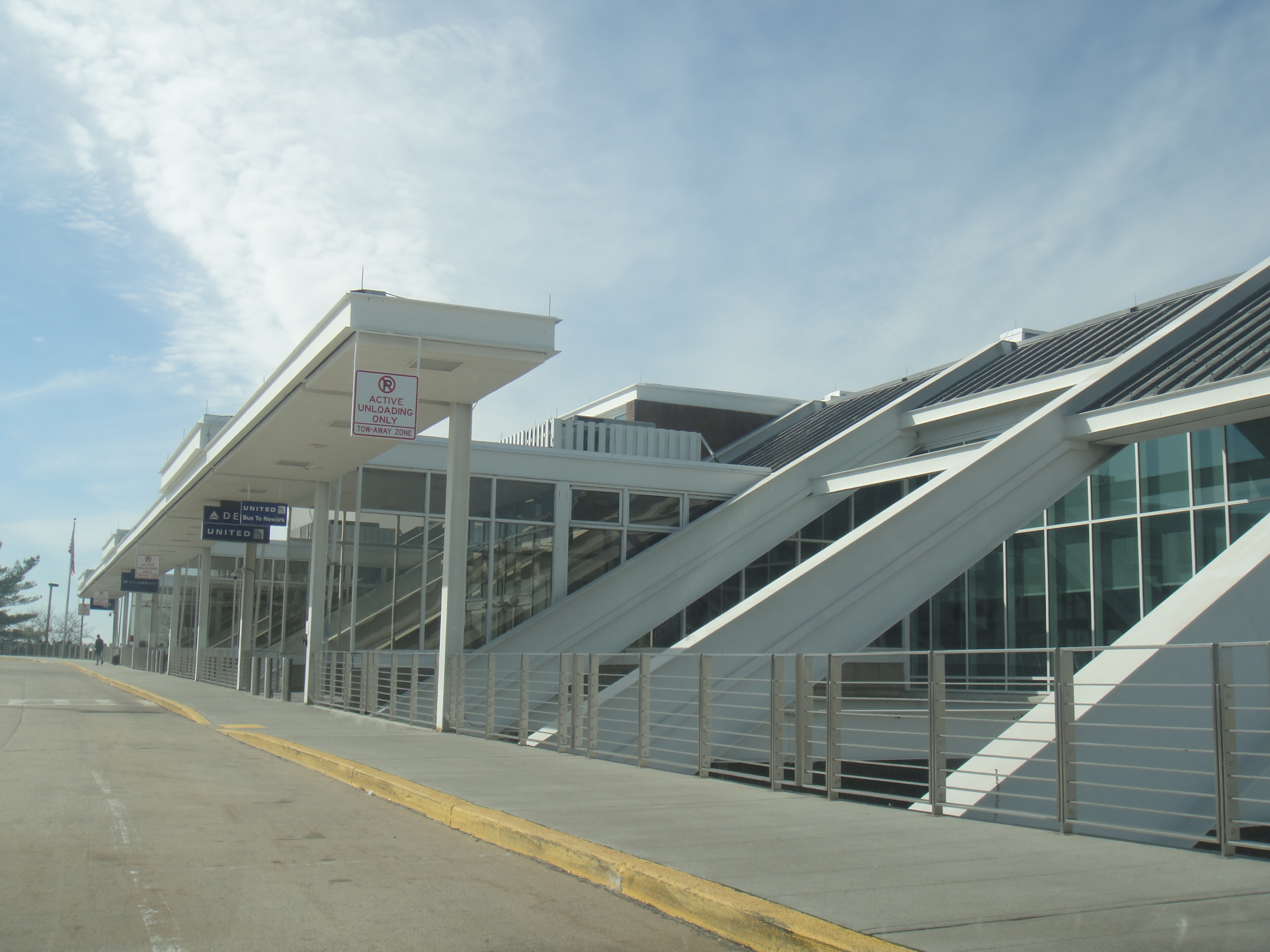
Lehigh Valley International Airport, the fourth-busiest passenger airport in Pennsylvania, located in Hanover Township

=== Air transportation ===
Air transport to and from Northampton County is available through Lehigh Valley International Airport (IATA: ABE, ICAO: KABE) in Hanover Township, which is located approximately 4 miles (6.4 km) northwest of Bethlehem and 11 miles (18 km) west-southwest of Easton.

=== Bus transportation ===
Public bus service in Northampton County is available through LANta. A shuttle bus service called the Bethlehem Loop provides public transportation services in Bethlehem. NJ Transit provides service from Easton's Centre Square to the Phillipsburg area.

=== Major highways ===
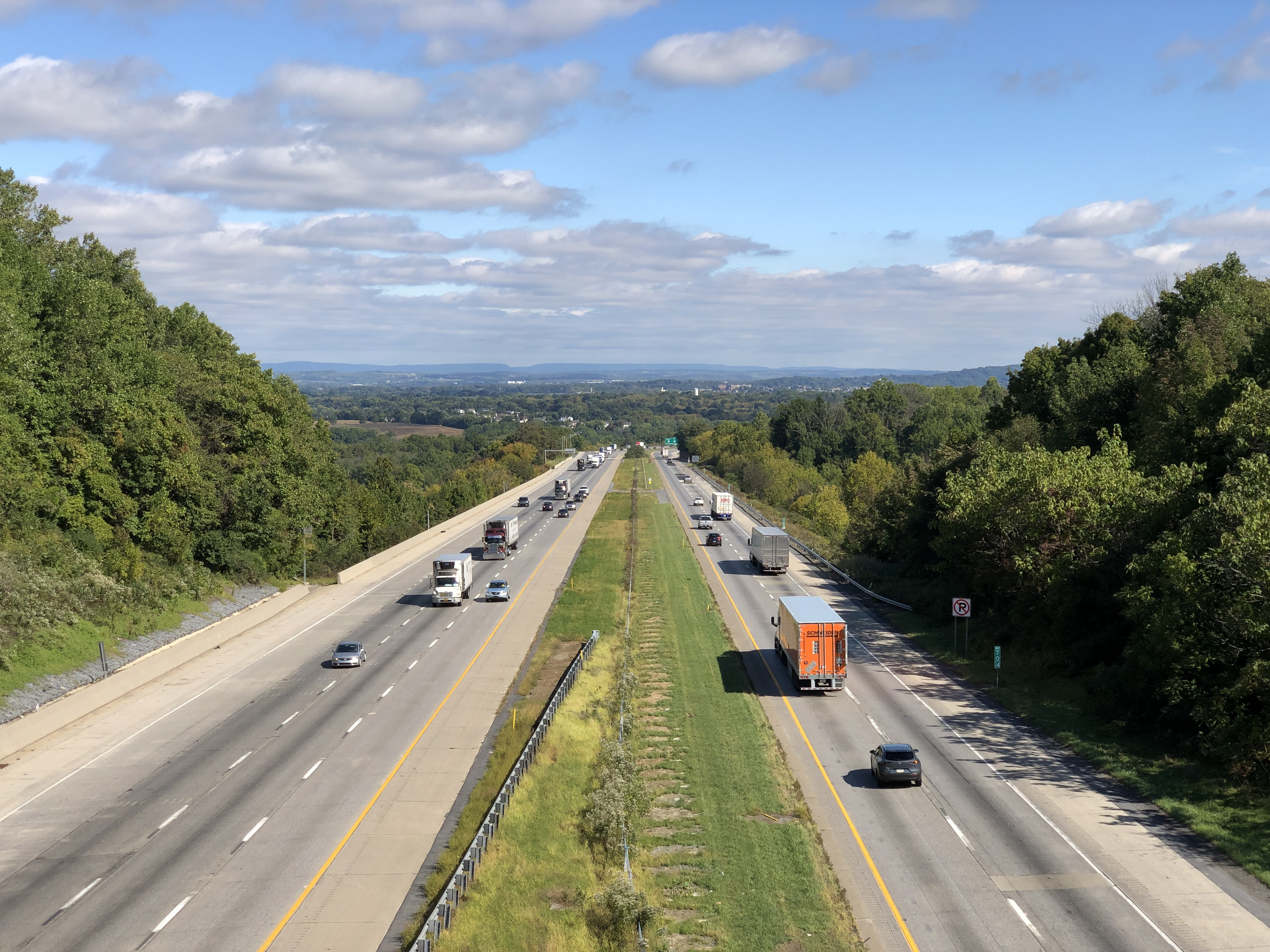
I-78 eastbound in Northampton County

- I-78
- US 22
- PA 33
- PA 145
- PA 191
- PA 248
- PA 329
- PA 378
- PA 412
- PA 512
- PA 611
- PA 946
- PA 987

== Telecommunications ==
Northampton County was once served only by the 215 area code from 1947 (when the North American Numbering Plan of the Bell System went into effect) until 1994. With the county's growing population, however, Northampton County was afforded area code 610 in 1994. Today, Northampton County is covered by 610 except for the Portland exchange which uses 570. An overlay area code, 484, was added to the 610 service area in 1999. A plan to introduce area code 835 as an additional overlay was rescinded in 2001.

== Recreation ==
There are two Pennsylvania state parks in Northampton County:

- Delaware Canal State Park follows the course of the old Delaware Canal along the Delaware River from Easton in Northampton County to Bristol in Bucks County.
- Jacobsburg Environmental Education Center

== Communities ==
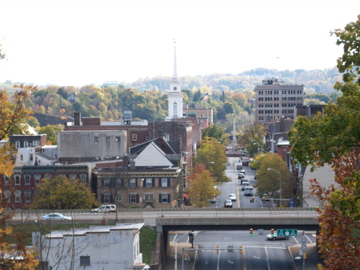
Easton, the county seat of Northampton County, in May 2009

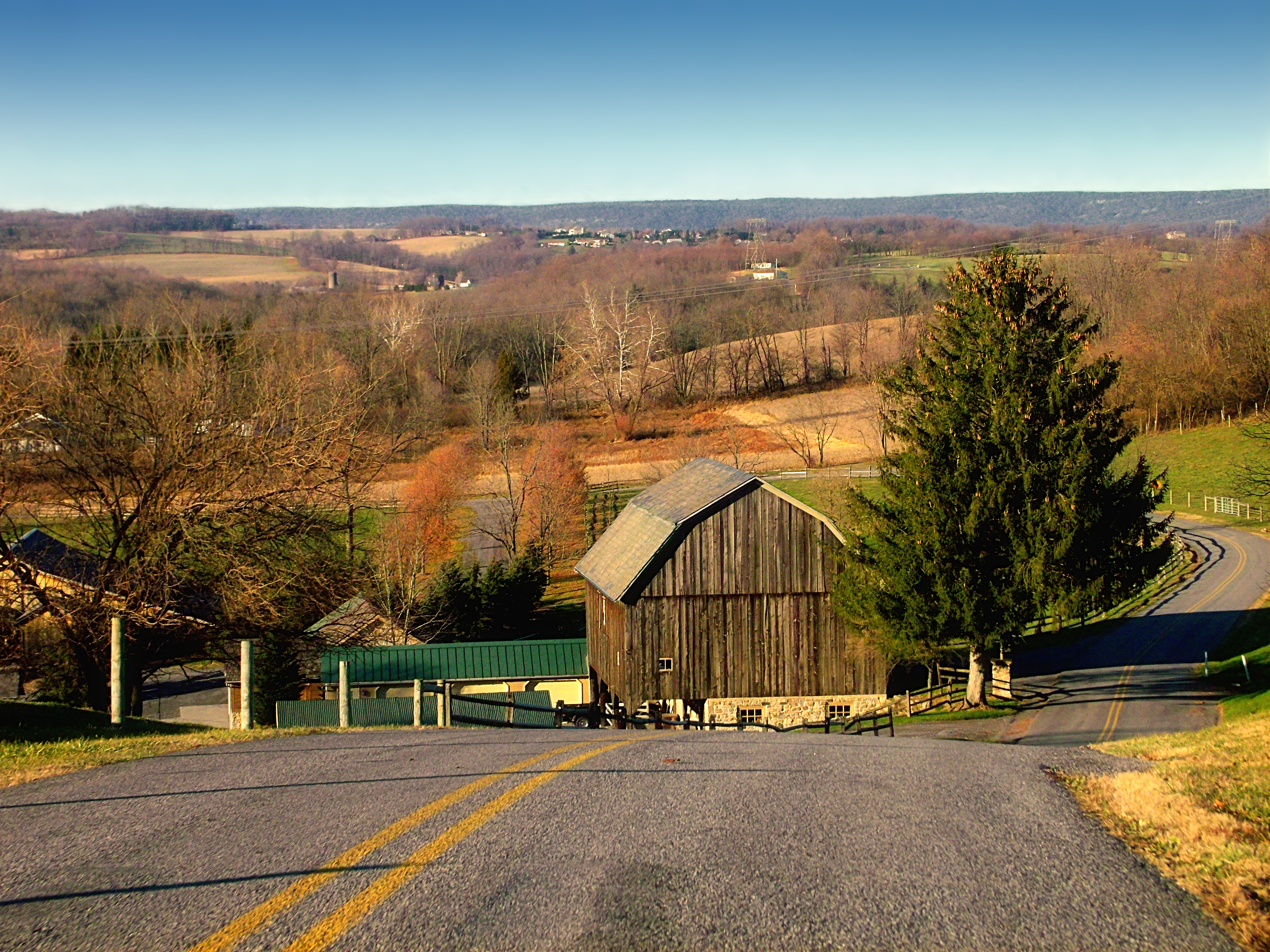
Allen Township, in November 2011

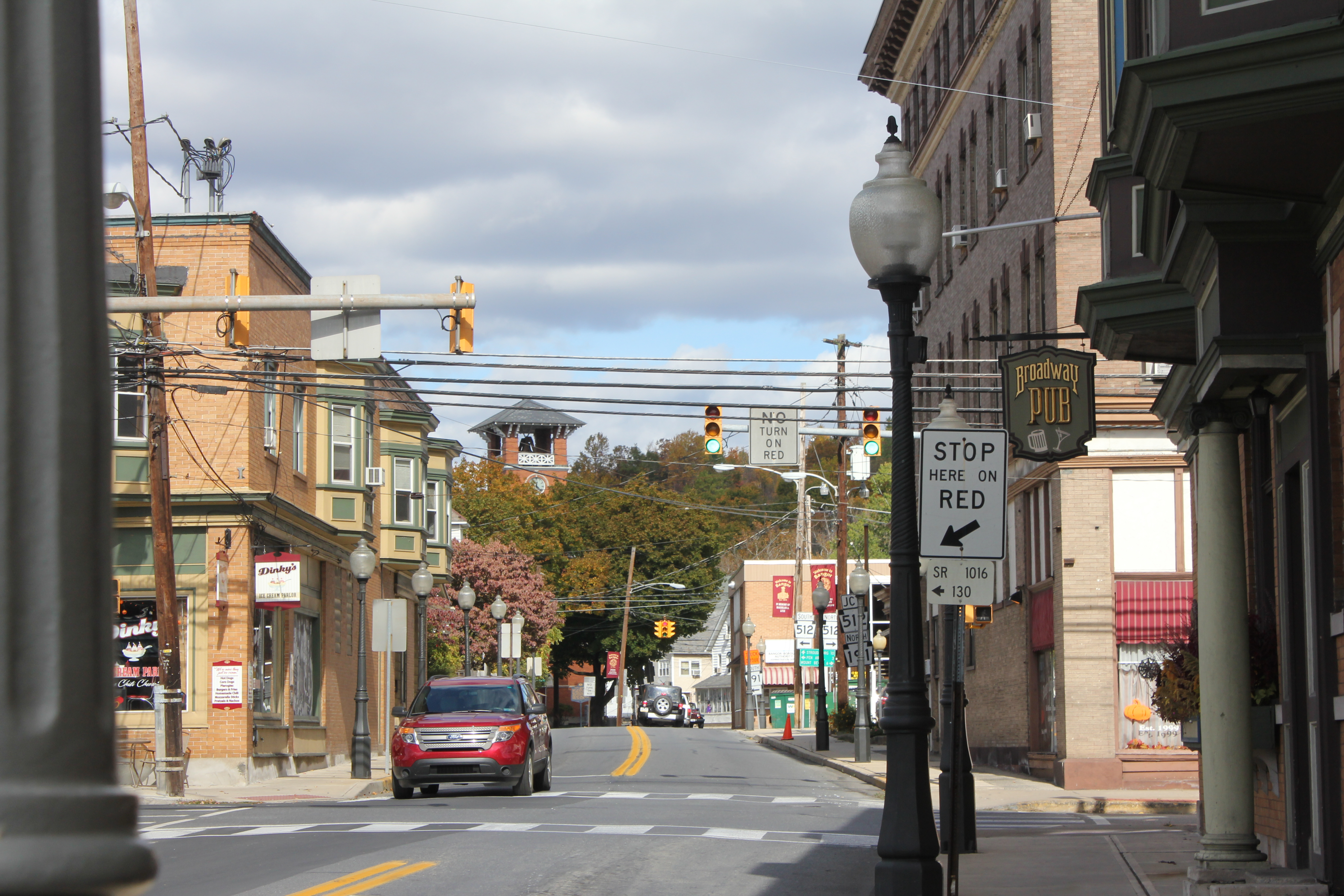
Bangor, in October 2015

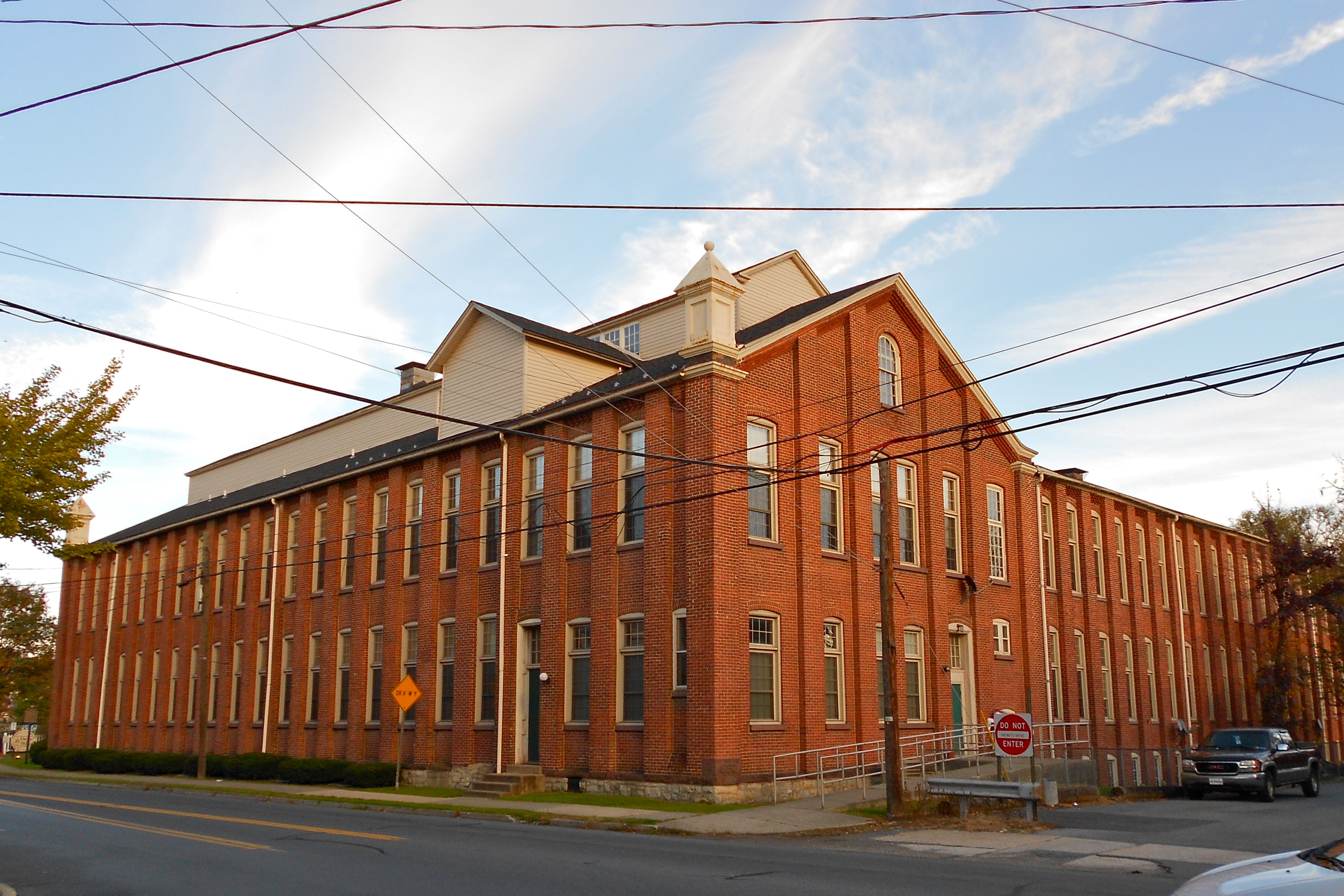
Dery Silk Mill in Catasauqua, in October 2012

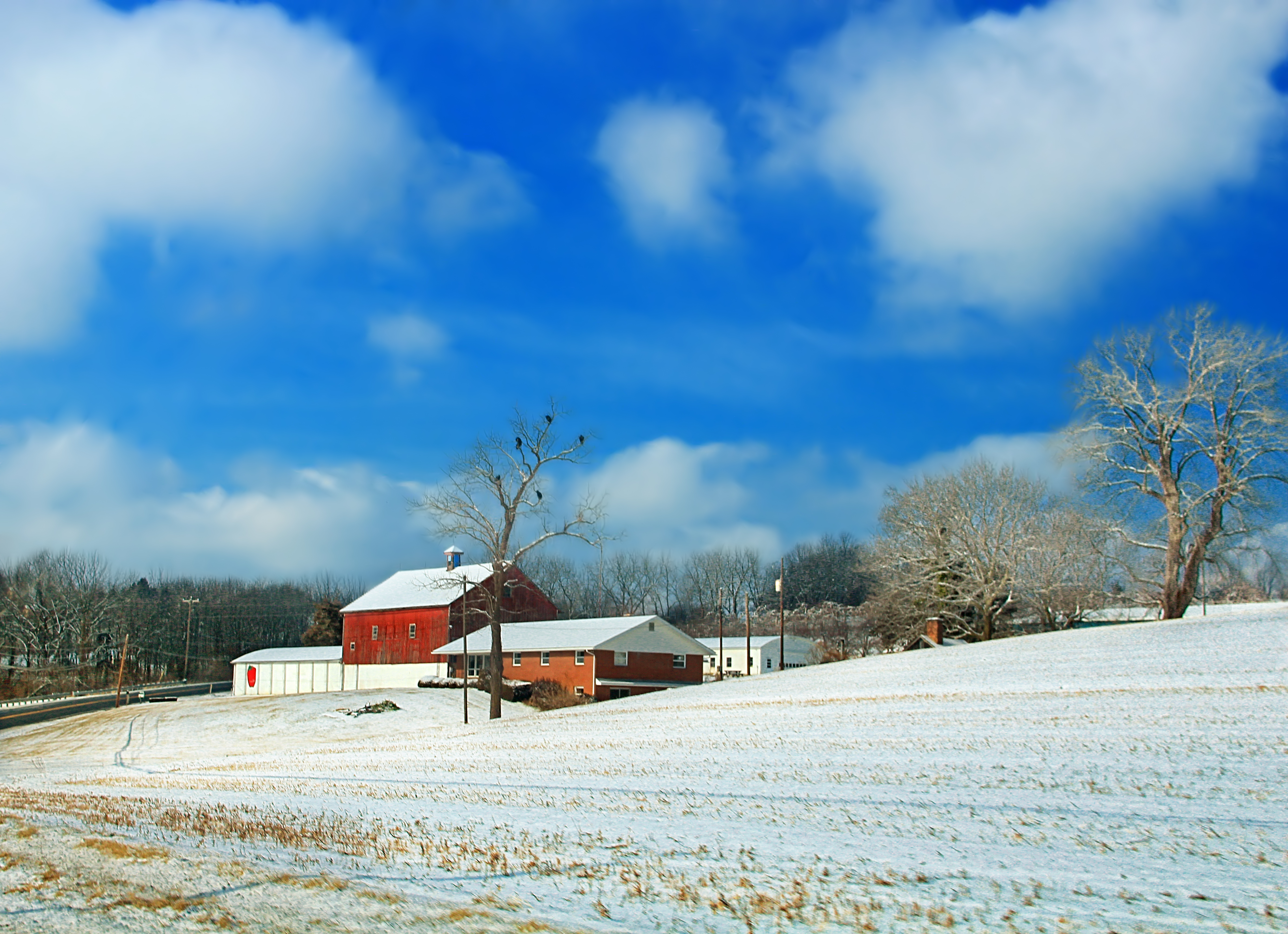
East Allen Township, in February 2013

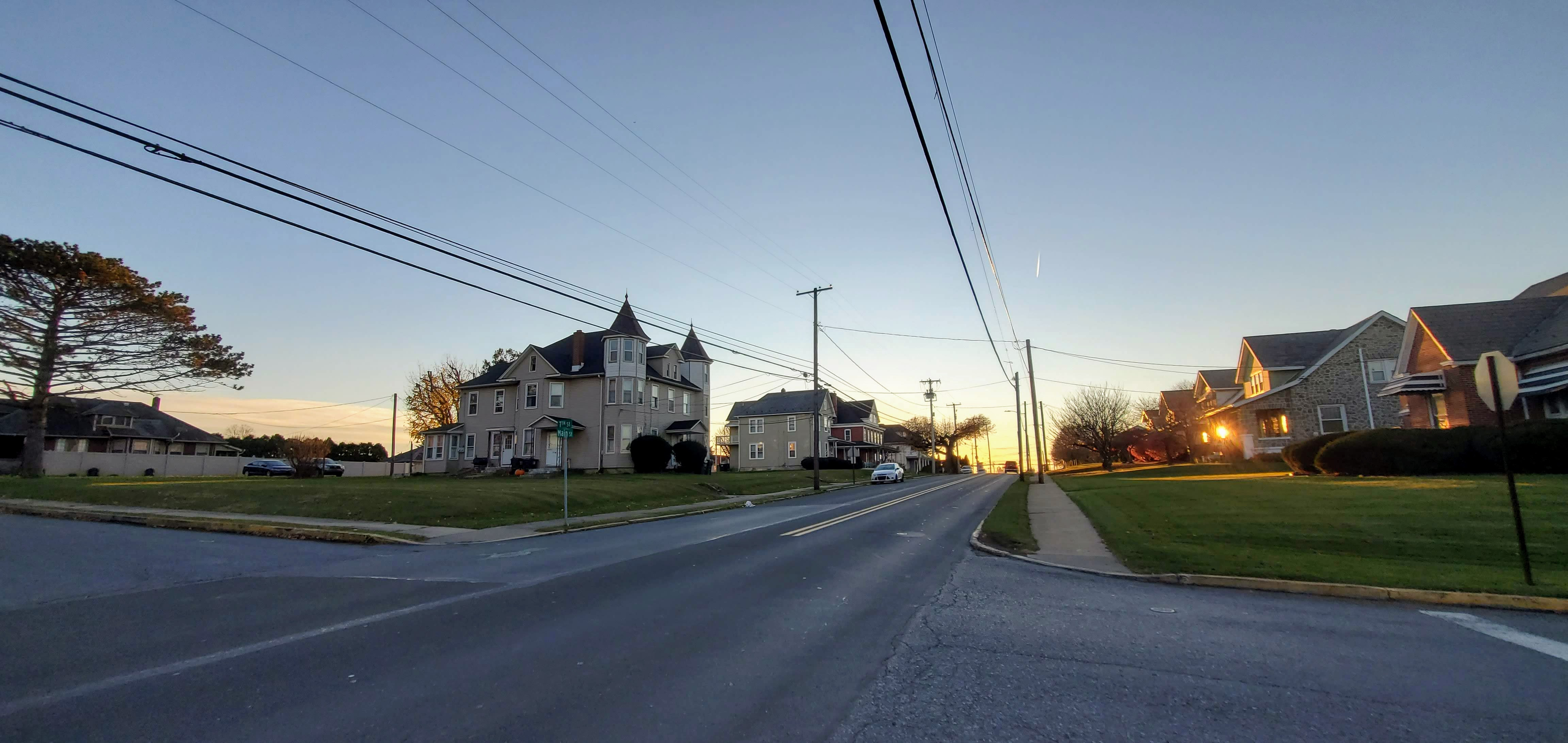
Tatamy at sundown, in November 2021

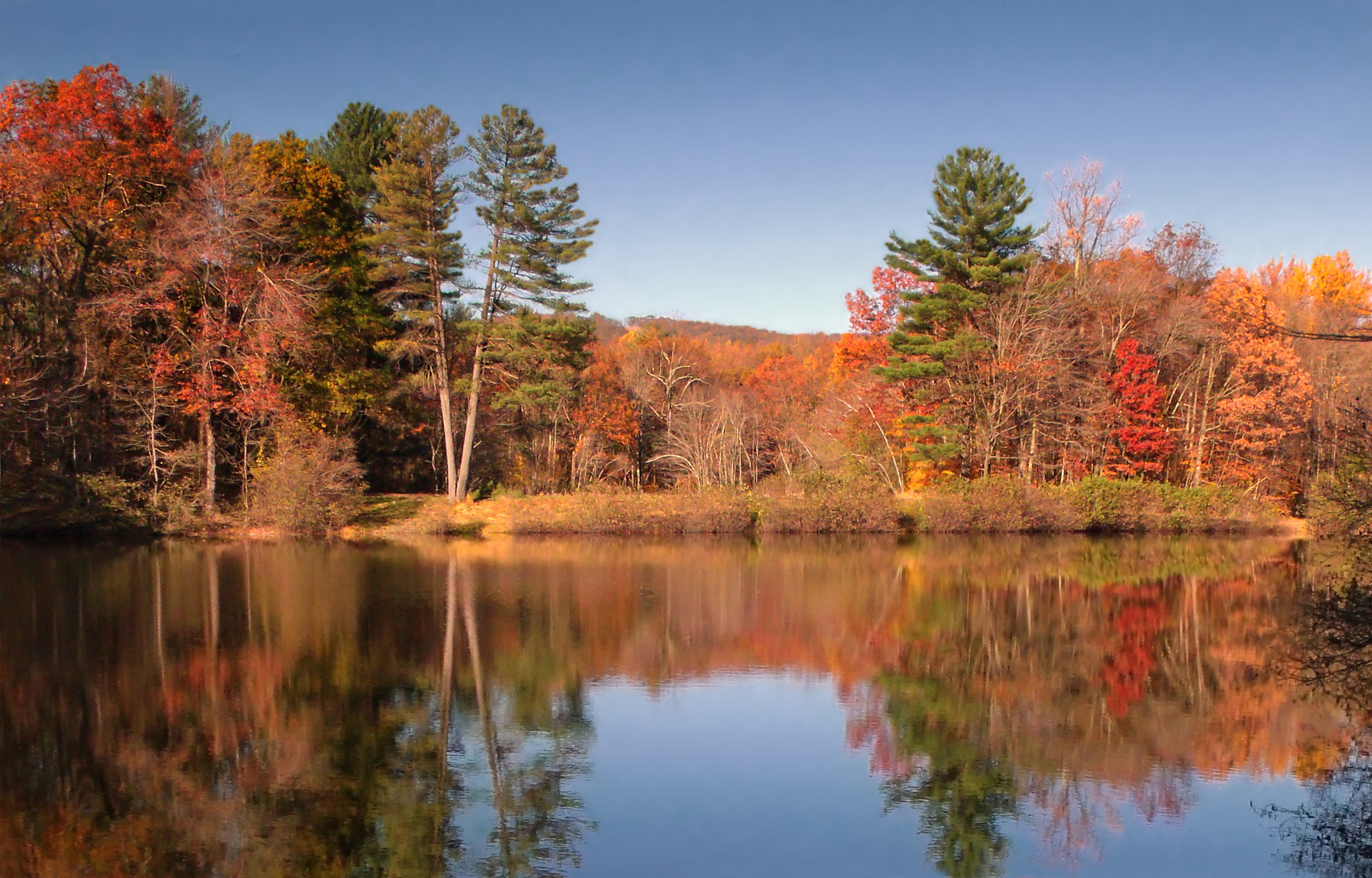
Lake Poco Dam in Upper Mount Bethel Township, in November 2011

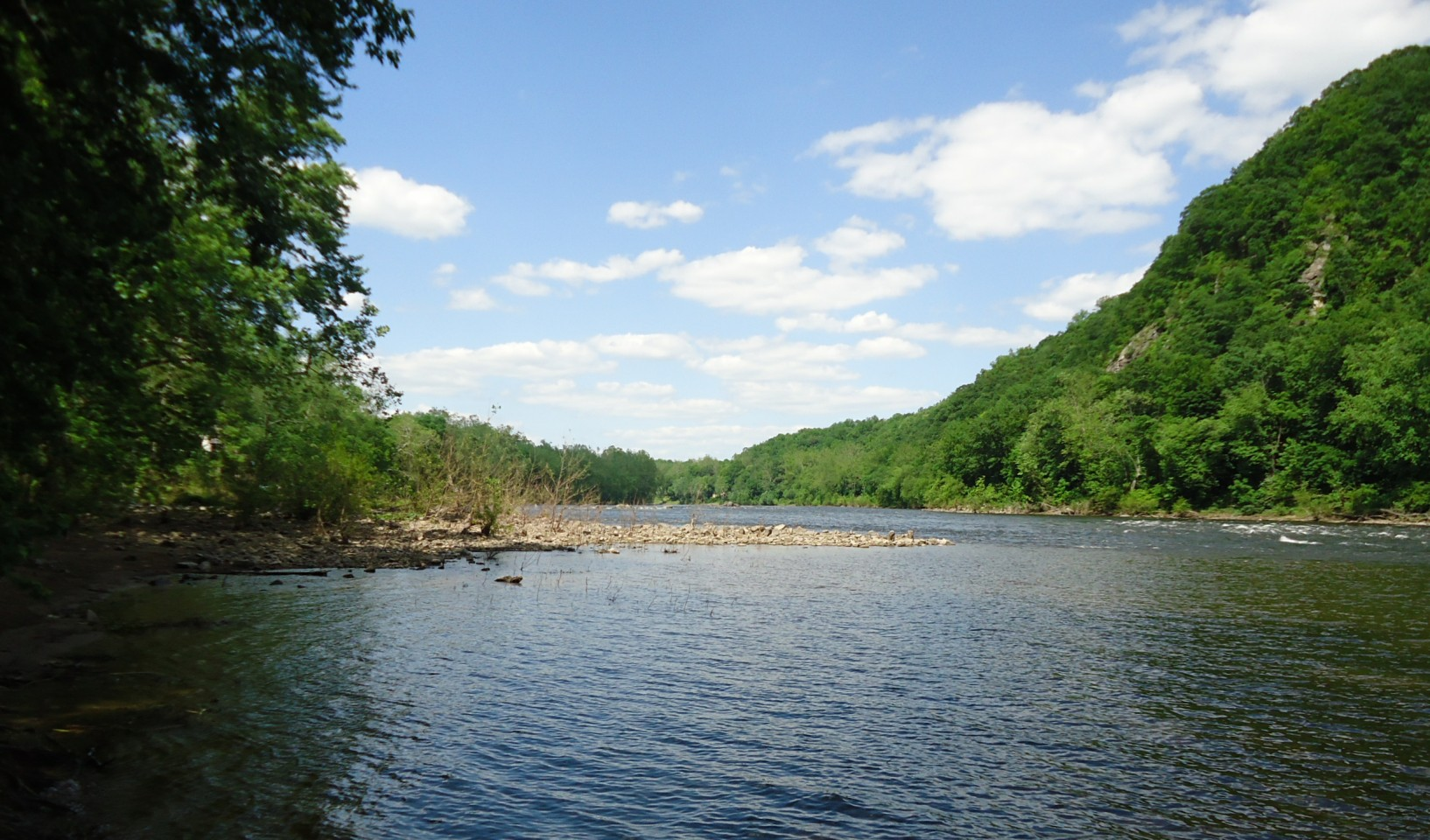
The Delaware River running through Forks Township, in May 2012

The following cities, boroughs, and townships are located in Northampton County:

=== Cities ===
- Bethlehem (partly in Lehigh County)
- Easton (county seat)

=== Boroughs ===
- Bangor
- Bath
- Chapman
- East Bangor
- Freemansburg
- Glendon
- Hellertown
- Nazareth
- North Catasauqua
- Northampton
- Pen Argyl
- Portland
- Roseto
- Stockertown
- Tatamy
- Walnutport
- West Easton
- Wilson
- Wind Gap

=== Townships ===
- Allen
- Bethlehem
- Bushkill
- East Allen
- Forks
- Hanover
- Lehigh
- Lower Mount Bethel
- Lower Nazareth
- Lower Saucon
- Moore
- Palmer
- Plainfield
- Upper Mount Bethel
- Upper Nazareth
- Washington
- Williams

=== Census-designated places ===
Census-designated places are unincorporated communities designated by the U.S. Census Bureau for the purposes of compiling demographic data. They are not actual jurisdictions under Pennsylvania law.

- Ackermanville
- Belfast
- Cherryville
- Chestnut Hill
- Eastlawn Gardens
- Martins Creek
- Middletown
- Morgan Hill
- Old Orchard
- Palmer Heights
- Raubsville

=== Other unincorporated places ===
- Beersville
- Berlinsville
- Butztown
- Chickentown
- Christian Springs
- Colesville
- Danielsville
- Emanuelsville
- Flicksville
- Franks Corner
- Hanoverville
- Hollo
- Katellen
- Klecknersville
- Moorestown
- Mount Bethel
- Newburg
- Schoenersville
- Seidersville
- Slateford
- Treichlers
- Wassergass
- Zucksville

=== Population ranking ===
The population ranking of the following table is based on the 2010 census of Northampton County.

† county seat

| Rank | City/borough/township/etc. | Municipal type | Population (2010 Census) |
|---|---|---|---|
| 1 | Bethlehem (partially in Lehigh County) | City | 74,982 |
| 2 | † Easton | City | 26,800 |
| 3 | Bethlehem Township | Township | 23,730 |
| 4 | Palmer Township | Township | 20,691 |
| 5 | Forks Township | Township | 14,721 |
| 6 | Hanover Township | Township | 10,866 |
| 7 | Lower Saucon Township | Township | 10,772 |
| 8 | Lehigh Township | Township | 10,527 |
| 9 | Northampton | Borough | 9,926 |
| 10 | Moore Township | Township | 9,198 |
| 11 | Bushkill Township | Township | 8,178 |
| 12 | Wilson | Borough | 7,896 |
| 13 | Middletown | CDP | 7,441 |
| 14 | Upper Mount Bethel Township | Township | 6,706 |
| 15 | Upper Nazareth Township | Township | 6,231 |
| 16 | Plainfield Township | Township | 6,138 |
| 17 | Hellertown | Borough | 5,898 |
| 18 | Williams Township | Township | 5,884 |
| 19 | Nazareth | Borough | 5,746 |
| 20 | Lower Nazareth Township | Township | 5,674 |
| 21 | Bangor | Borough | 5,273 |
| 22 | Washington Township | Township | 5,122 |
| 23 | East Allen Township | Township | 4,930 |
| 24 | Allen Township | Township | 4,269 |
| 25 | Palmer Heights | CDP | 3,762 |
| 26 | Pen Argyl | Borough | 3,595 |
| 27 | Eastlawn Gardens | CDP | 3,307 |
| 28 | Lower Mount Bethel Township | Township | 3,101 |
| 29 | North Catasauqua | Borough | 2,849 |
| 30 | Wind Gap | Borough | 2,720 |
| 31 | Bath | Borough | 2,693 |
| 32 | Freemansburg | Borough | 2,636 |
| 33 | Old Orchard | CDP | 2,434 |
| 34 | Walnutport | Borough | 2,070 |
| 35 | Cherryville | CDP | 1,580 |
| 36 | Roseto | Borough | 1,567 |
| 37 | Belfast | CDP | 1,257 |
| 38 | West Easton | Borough | 1,257 |
| 39 | Tatamy | Borough | 1,203 |
| 40 | East Bangor | Borough | 1,172 |
| 41 | Raubsville | CDP | 1,088 |
| 42 | Stockertown | Borough | 927 |
| 43 | Martins Creek | CDP | 631 |
| 44 | Ackermanville | CDP | 610 |
| 45 | Portland | Borough | 519 |
| 46 | Glendon | Borough | 440 |
| 47 | Chapman | Borough | 199 |
