= Easton Area School District =

School district in Pennsylvania

Address
- 1801 Bushkill Drive Easton, Pennsylvania, U.S.
- Coordinates: 40.7027°N 75.2415°W

District information
- Type: Public
- Grades: K through 12
- Schools: Nine, including Easton Area High School
- Budget: $214.1 million (2025-2026)
- NCES District ID: 4208850

Students and staff
- Students: 7,978 (2024-25)
- Faculty: 582.0 (on an FTE basis)
- Student–teacher ratio: 13.71
- Athletic conference: Eastern Pennsylvania Conference
- District mascot: Rover
- Colors: Red and white

Other information
- Website: www.eastonsd.org

Easton Area School District is an urban, suburban, and rural public school district located in Northampton County in the Lehigh Valley region of eastern Pennsylvania. It serves the city of Easton and Forks, Palmer, and portions of Lower Mount Bethel townships.

Students in grades nine through 12 attend Easton Area High School in Easton. Students in grades six through eight attend Easton Area Middle School, and the district has seven elementary schools, Ada B. Cheston, F.A. March, Tracy, Forks, Palmer, Paxinosa, and Shawnee, for kindergarten through fifth grades. As of the 2024–25 school year, the school district had a total enrollment of 7,978 students between all nine of its schools, according to National Center for Education Statistics data.

Easton Area School District encompasses approximately 28 square miles. In 2009, the per capita income was $20,875, while the median family income was $53,545. According to 2005 local census data, it served a resident population of 63,195.

== History ==
The district previously covered Riegelsville, in Bucks County. In 2006, a campaign to move Riegelsville from the Easton Area School District to the Palisades School District began.

In 2011, Ronald J. Tomalis, the Secretary of Education of Pennsylvania, ruled in favor of the Riegelsville Tax and Education Coalition by stating that the group's request is related to education quality. The previous secretary had ruled against the group. Clyde Waite, a judge in Bucks County approved the plan in 2012. Riegelsville was to be an independent school district for a period between it being part of two different school districts. The Pennsylvania Department of Education approved the moving of districts in July 2012. The change was to be effective in 2013. Around 60 students were to be moved to the Palisades district. To cover the student transfer, the Palisades district gave $1,400,000 to the Easton Area school district.

== Schools ==
- Easton Area High School
- Easton Area Middle School
- Ada B. Cheston Elementary School
- F.A. March Elementary School
- Forks Elementary School
- Palmer Elementary School
- Paxinosa Elementary School
- Shawnee Elementary School
- Tracy Elementary School

Grade Configuration within the EASD:

- K–5 (Elementary School)
- 6–8 (Middle School)
- 9–12 (High School)
