= List of Art Deco architecture in Pennsylvania =

This is a list of buildings that are examples of the Art Deco architectural style in Pennsylvania, United States.

== Erie ==
- Boston Store, Erie, 1929
- Erie Armory, Erie, 1929
- Erie Federal Courthouse, Erie, 1937
- Renaissance Centre, Erie, 1925
- Union Station, Erie, 1927
- United States Post Office, Erie, 1945
- Warner Theatre, Erie, 1931

== Philadelphia ==
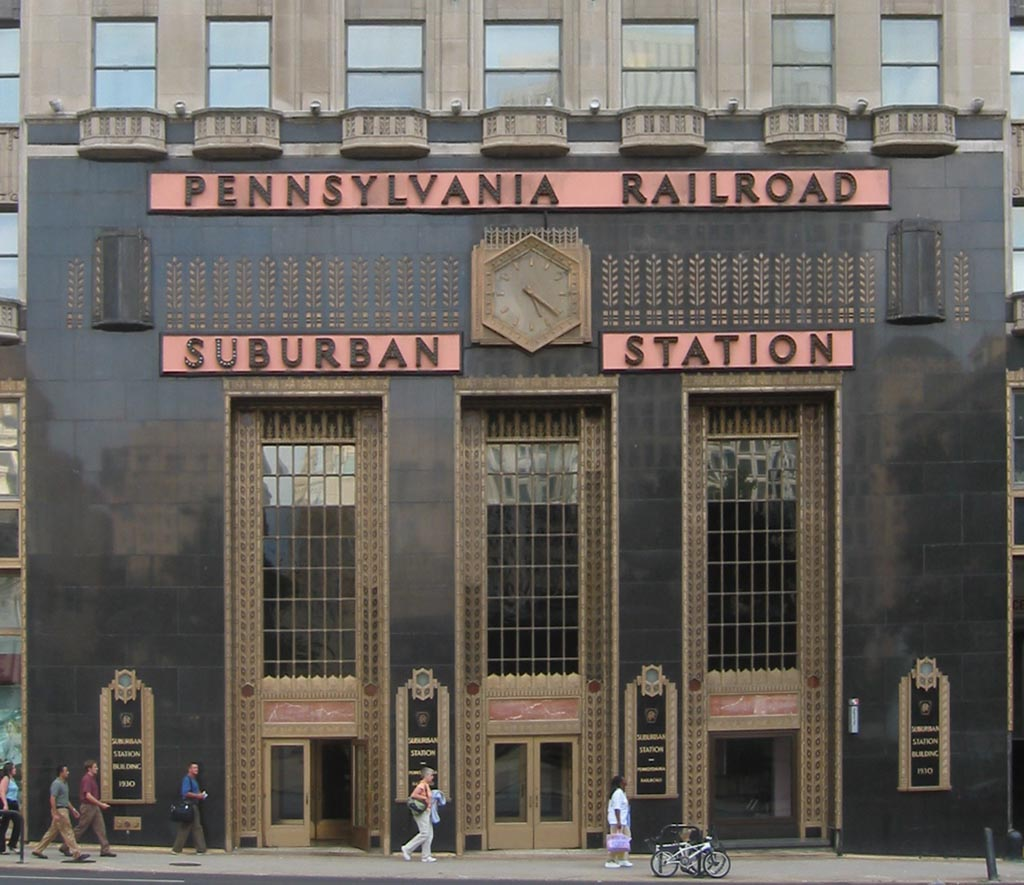
Suburban Station at Penn Center in Philadelphia

- 30th Street Station, Philadelphia, 1934
- 1616 Walnut Street Building, Philadelphia, 1929
- 1822 Spring Garden, Philadelphia, 1930s or 1940s
- Academy at Palumbo, Queen Village, Philadelphia, 1930
- Academy for the Middle Years Northwest Middle School, Philadelphia, 1896 and 1929
- Beneficial Savings Bank, Philadelphia, 1946
- Bodine High School for International Affairs, Northern Liberties, Philadelphia, 1924
- Boyd Theatre, Philadelphia, 1928
- Central High School, Logan, Philadelphia, 1937
- Clara Barton School, Feltonville, Philadelphia, 1925
- Crown Can Company Building, Juniata, Philadelphia
- Delaplaine McDaniel School, Point Breeze, Philadelphia, 1935–1937
- Drake Hotel, Philadelphia, 1928
- Edward W. Bok Technical High School, Philadelphia, 1938
- Edwin Forrest School, Mayfair, Philadelphia, 1929
- Edwin M. Stanton School, Southwest Center City, Philadelphia, 1926
- Ethan Allen School, Mayfair, Philadelphia, 1930
- Francis Hopkinson School, Juniata, Philadelphia, 1927
- G.W. Childs Elementary School, Point Breeze, Philadelphia, 1908 and 1927
- Gen. John F. Reynolds School, Philadelphia, 1926
- George Meade School, North Central, Philadelphia, 1936
- George W. Nebinger Elementary School, Bella Vista, Philadelphia, 1925
- Hajoca Corporation Headquarters and Showroom, University City, Philadelphia, 1921 and 1930
- James J. Sullivan School, Frankford, Philadelphia, 1930
- Jim's Steaks, Philadelphia
- John Bartram High School, Southwest Philadelphia, Philadelphia, 1939
- Joseph H. Brown Elementary School, Holmesburg, Philadelphia, 1937
- Joseph W. Catharine School, Mount Moriah, Philadelphia, 1938
- Lewis Tower, Center City, Philadelphia, 1929
- Lydia Darrah School, Francisville, Philadelphia, 1927
- Market Street National Bank (now Marriott Residence Inn), Philadelphia, 1929
- Mary Channing Wister School, Poplar, Philadelphia, 1926
- Murrell Dobbins Career and Technical Education High School, North Philadelphia, Philadelphia, 1937
- National Bank of North Philadelphia, Nicetown–Tioga, Philadelphia, 1928
- Naval Hospital Philadelphia, Philadelphia, 1935
- Nix Federal Building, Philadelphia, 1941
- One South Broad, Center City, Philadelphia, 1932
- Our Lady of Loreto Church, Philadelphia, 1938
- Paul Lawrence Dunbar School, Templetown, Philadelphia, 1932
- Pennsylvania Railroad Freight Building, University City, Philadelphia, 1929
- Penypack Theatre, Holmesburg, Philadelphia, 1929
- Philadelphia Museum of Art Perelman Building Philadelphia, 1926
- Philadelphia Quartermaster Depot, Philadelphia, 1799 and 1926
- Philadelphia School of Occupational Therapy, Philadelphia, 1929
- Robert Fulton School, Morton, Philadelphia, 1937
- Roberts Vaux Junior High School, North Central, Philadelphia, 1938
- Sedgwick Theater, Mount Airy, Philadelphia, 1928
- Special Troops Armory, Ogontz, Philadelphia, 1938
- Spring Garden School, Poplar, Philadelphia, 1931
- Suburban Station, Penn Station, Philadelphia, 1934
- Sun Oil Building, Center City, Philadelphia, 1928
- Terminal Commerce Building, Callowhill, Philadelphia, 1931
- Thomas K. Finletter School, Olney, Philadelphia, 1930
- Tindley Temple United Methodist Church, Southwest Center City, Philadelphia, 1923
- United States Court House and Post Office, Philadelphia, 1930s
- United States Custom House, Philadelphia, 1934
- United States Post Office–Main Branch, Philadelphia, 1931–1935
- Uptown Theater, Philadelphia, 1927
- Vare-Washington School, Dickinson Narrows, Philadelphia, 1937
- WCAU TV Building, 1622 Chestnut Street, Philadelphia, 1928
- William M. Meredith School, Queens Village, Philadelphia, 1931
- YMCA Philadelphia, Philadelphia, 1926

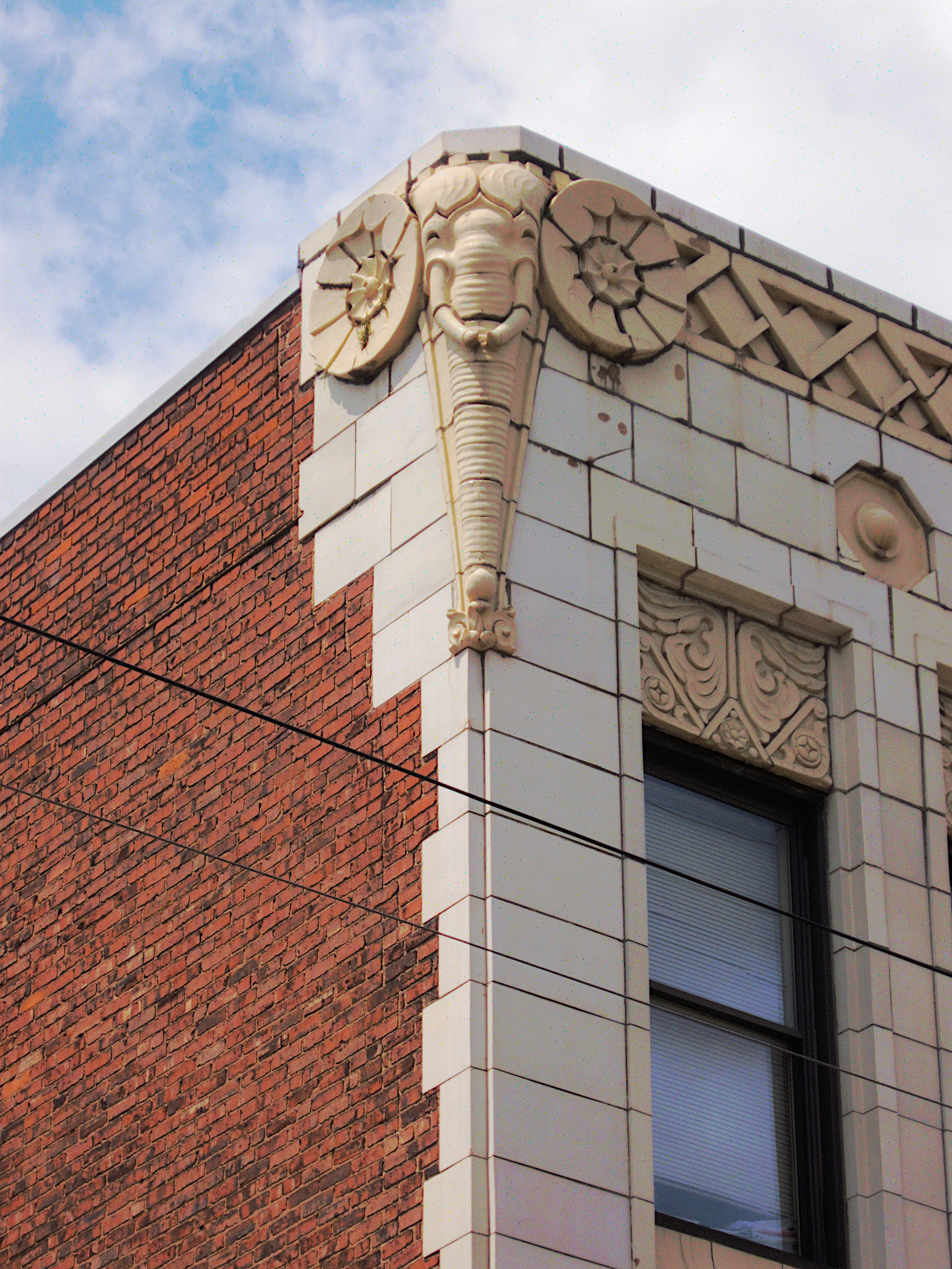
Brighton Theater in Pittsburgh

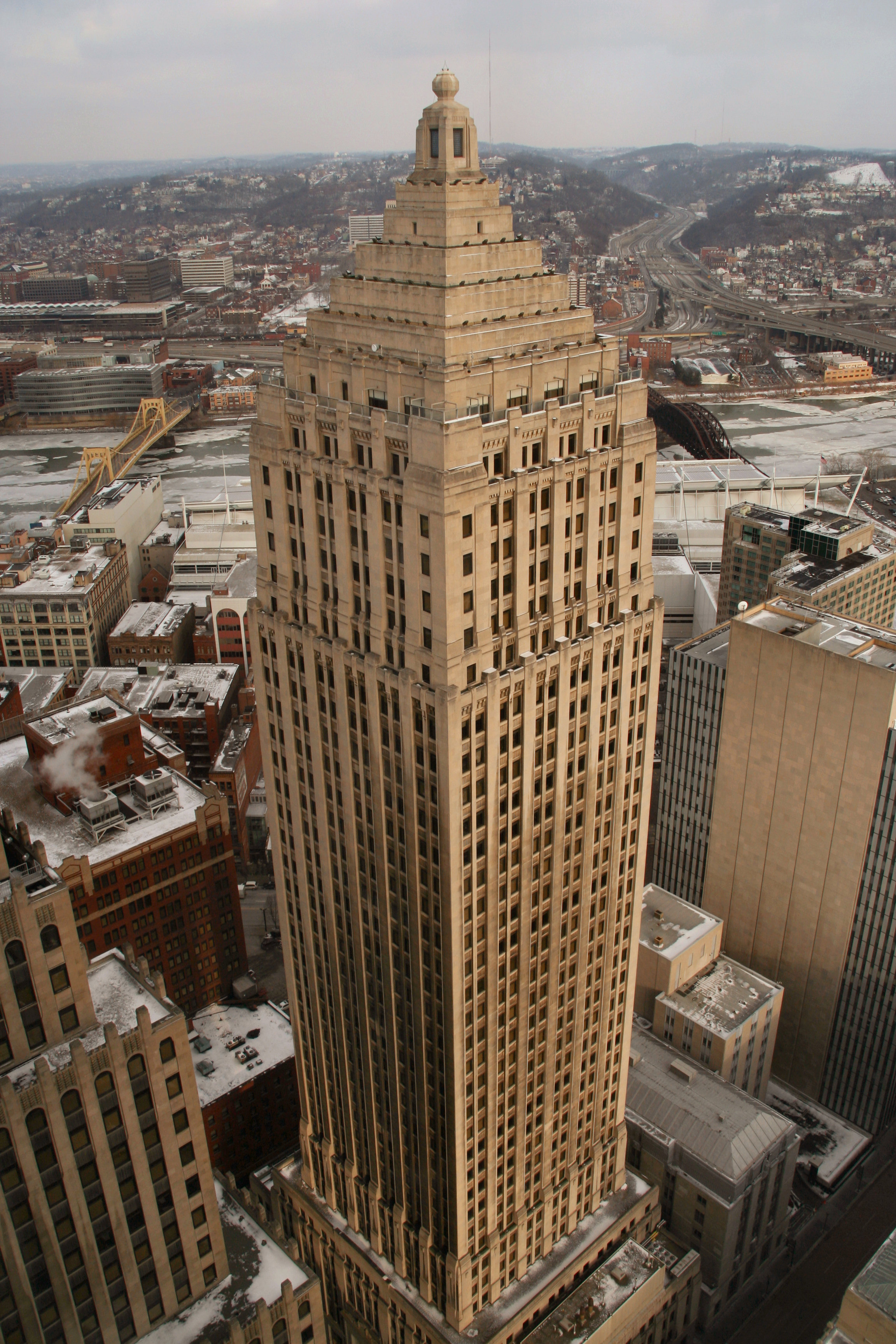
Gulf Tower in Pittsburgh

== Pittsburgh ==
- Bell Telephone Building, Downtown Pittsburgh, Pittsburgh, 1923
- Brighton Theater (now NALC Branch), Pittsburgh, 1928
- Cathedral of Learning, Pittsburgh, 1937
- Conroy Education Center, Pittsburgh, 1895
- EQT Plaza, Downtown Pittsburgh, Pittsburgh, 1984
- Fulton Elementary School, Highland Park, Pittsburgh, 1894 and 1929
- Grant Building, Downtown Pittsburgh, Pittsburgh, 1929
- Gulf Tower, Downtown Pittsburgh, Pittsburgh, 1932
- Highland Towers Apartments, Shadyside, Pittsburgh, 1913
- Knoxville Junior High School, Knoxville, Pittsburgh, 1927
- Koppers Building, Pittsburgh, 1929
- Larimer School, Larimer, Pittsburgh, 1896 and 1931
- Lemington Elementary School, Pittsburgh, 1937
- Letsche Elementary School, Pittsburgh, 1905
- Lincoln Elementary School, Larimer, Pittsburgh, 1931
- Madison Elementary School, Upper Hill, Pittsburgh, 1902 and 1929
- Medical Arts Building, University of Pittsburgh Medical Center, Pittsburgh, 1931
- Mifflin Elementary School, Pittsburgh, 1932
- New Granada Theater, Hill District, Pittsburgh, 1928
- Oliver High School, Pittsburgh, 1925
- Omni William Penn Hotel, Downtown Pittsburgh, Pittsburgh, 1916 and 1929
- Prospect Junior High and Elementary School, Mount Washington, Pittsburgh, 1931
- Salk Hall, University of Pittsburgh, Pittsburgh, 1941
- Schiller Elementary School, East Allegheny, Pittsburgh, 1939
- Thaddeus Stevens Elementary School, Elliott, Pittsburgh, 1939
- Washington Education Center, Pittsburgh, 1936
- Western Psychiatric Institute and Clinic, Pittsburgh, 1938–1940
- Whitehill-Gleason Motors, East Liberty, Pittsburgh, 1920

== Reading ==
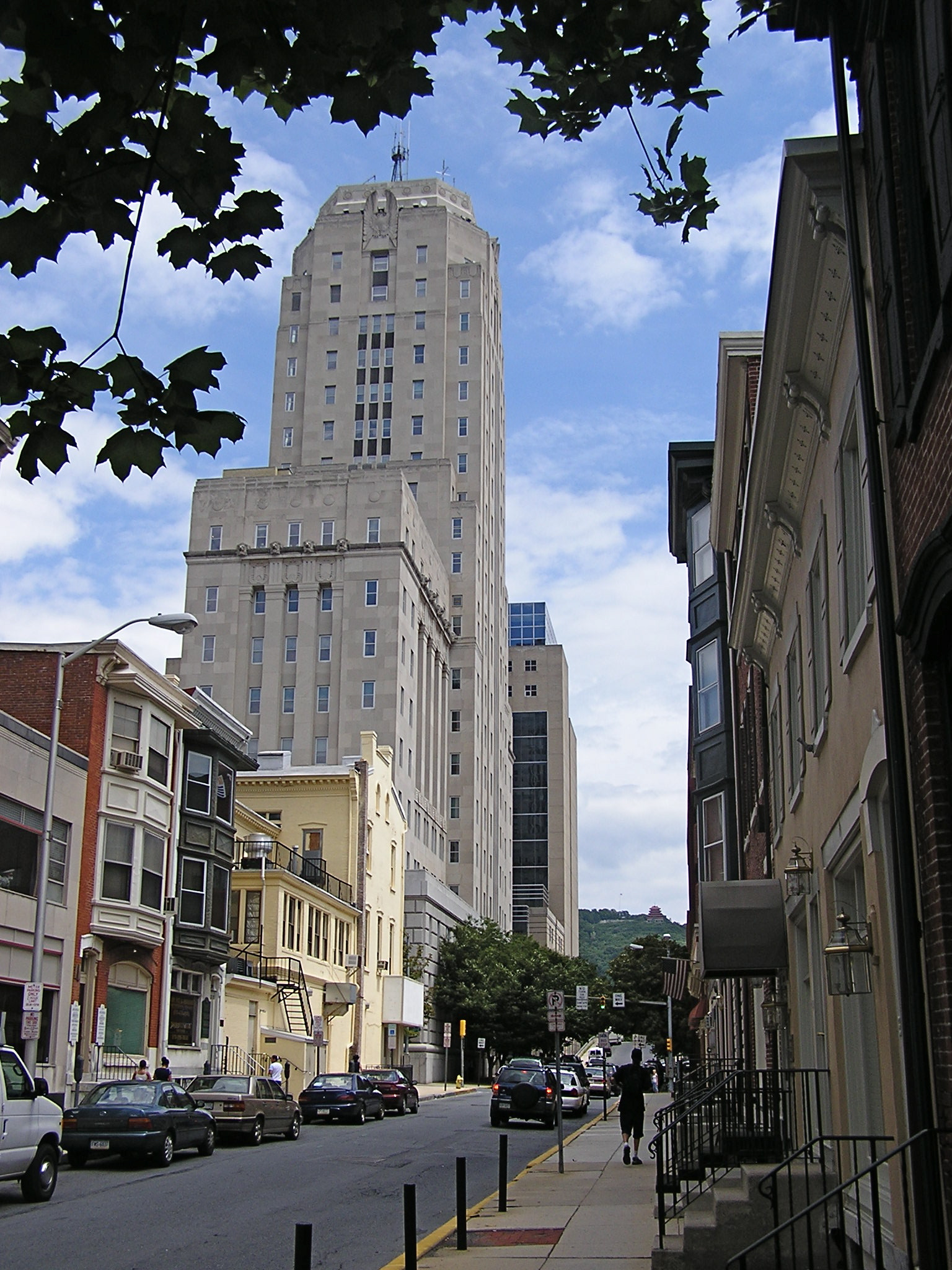
Berks County Courthouse in Reading

- Astor Theater, Reading, 1928
- Berks County Courthouse, Reading, 1932
- Hotel Abraham Lincoln, Reading, 1930

== York ==
- Mt. Rose School, York
- Valencia Ballroom, York, 1930s
- York Hospital, York
- York Telephone and Telegraph Building, York

== Other cities ==
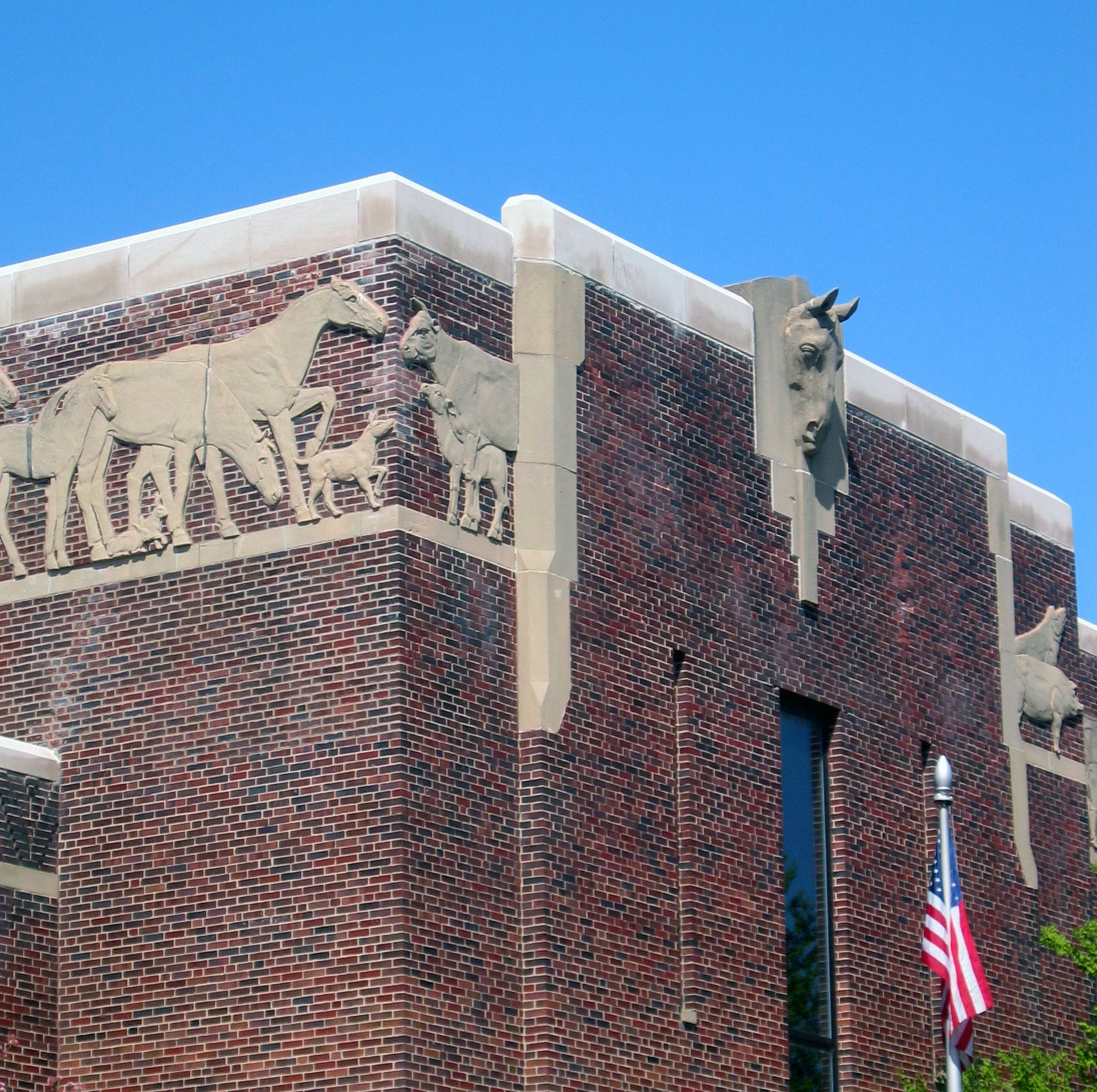
Pennsylvania Farm Show Complex & Expo Center in Harrisburg

- 1419 Darby Road, Havertown, 1945
- Allegheny County Airport, West Mifflin, 1931
- Allen Theatre, Annville
- Altoona Armory, Logan Township, 1938
- Alvina Krause Theatre (former Columbia Theatre), Bloomsburg, 1940
- Anthony Wayne Theatre, Wayne, 1928
- Arcadia Theatre, Wellsboro, 1921
- Berwick Theatre, Berwick, 1926
- Bethlehem Armory, Bethlehem, 1930
- Bradfords Main Street Movie House, Bradford, 1935
- Butler Armory, Butler, 1922, 1930
- Campus Theatre, Lewisburg Historic District, Lewisburg, 1941
- Carlisle Theatre, Carlisle, 1939
- Civic Theatre of Allentown, Allentown, 1928
- Clearfield Armory, Lawrence Township, 1938
- Coraopolis Armory, Coraopolis, 1938
- County Cinema, Doylestown Historic District, Doylestown, 1938
- Dime Savings and Trust Company, Allentown, 1925
- Easton National Bank, Easton Historic District, Eaton Township, 1929
- F M. Kirby Center, Wilkes-Barre, 1938
- Farmers National Bank, Bloomsburg, 1941
- First National Bank of Leechburg, Leechburg, late 1920s
- Gettysburg Armory, Gettysburg, 1938
- Hamburg Armory, Hamburg, 1939
- Hiway Theatre, Jenkintown, 1925
- Huntingdon Armory, Huntingdon, 1930 and 1937
- Jacob Mayer Building, Easton Historic District, Easton, 1930s
- John Henry Neff Elementary School, Lancaster, 1930s
- J.P. McCaskey High School, Lancaster, 1938
- Kane Armory, Kane, 1922
- Latrobe Armory, Latrobe, 1928
- Leader Building, Jacobus
- Lewisburg Armory, East Buffalo Township, 1938
- Ligonier Armory, Ligonier, 1938
- Montgomery Ward Building, Lewiston, 1929
- Moose Lodge, Williamsport, 1940
- Mount St. Peter Church, New Kensington, 1942
- The Movies (former Sauconia Theatre), Hellertown, 1940 and 1968
- N. N. Moss Building, Greenville, 1920
- New Castle Armory, Shenango Township, 1938
- Paxton Municipal Building, Harrisburg, 1930s
- Pennsylvania Farm Show Complex & Expo Center, Harrisburg, 1931
- Roxy Theatre (former Dreamland Theatre), Lock Haven, 1924 and 1931
- Royer Pharmacy, Ephrata, 1938
- Scottdale Armory, Scottdale, 1929
- Strawbridge & Clothier, Jenkinton, 1931 and 1954
- Union National Bank of Mahanoy City, Mahanoy City, 1922
- Warner Theater, West Chester, 1930
- Waynesboro Armory, Waynesboro, 1938
- Wellsboro Armory, Wellsboro, 1932
- William J. Nealon Federal Building and United States Courthouse, Scranton, 1931
- Williamsport Armory, Williamsport, 1927

== See also ==
- List of Art Deco architecture
- List of Art Deco architecture in the United States
