= Easton Historic District (Easton, Pennsylvania) =

Historic district in Pennsylvania, United States

- U.S. National Register of Historic Places
- U.S. Historic district
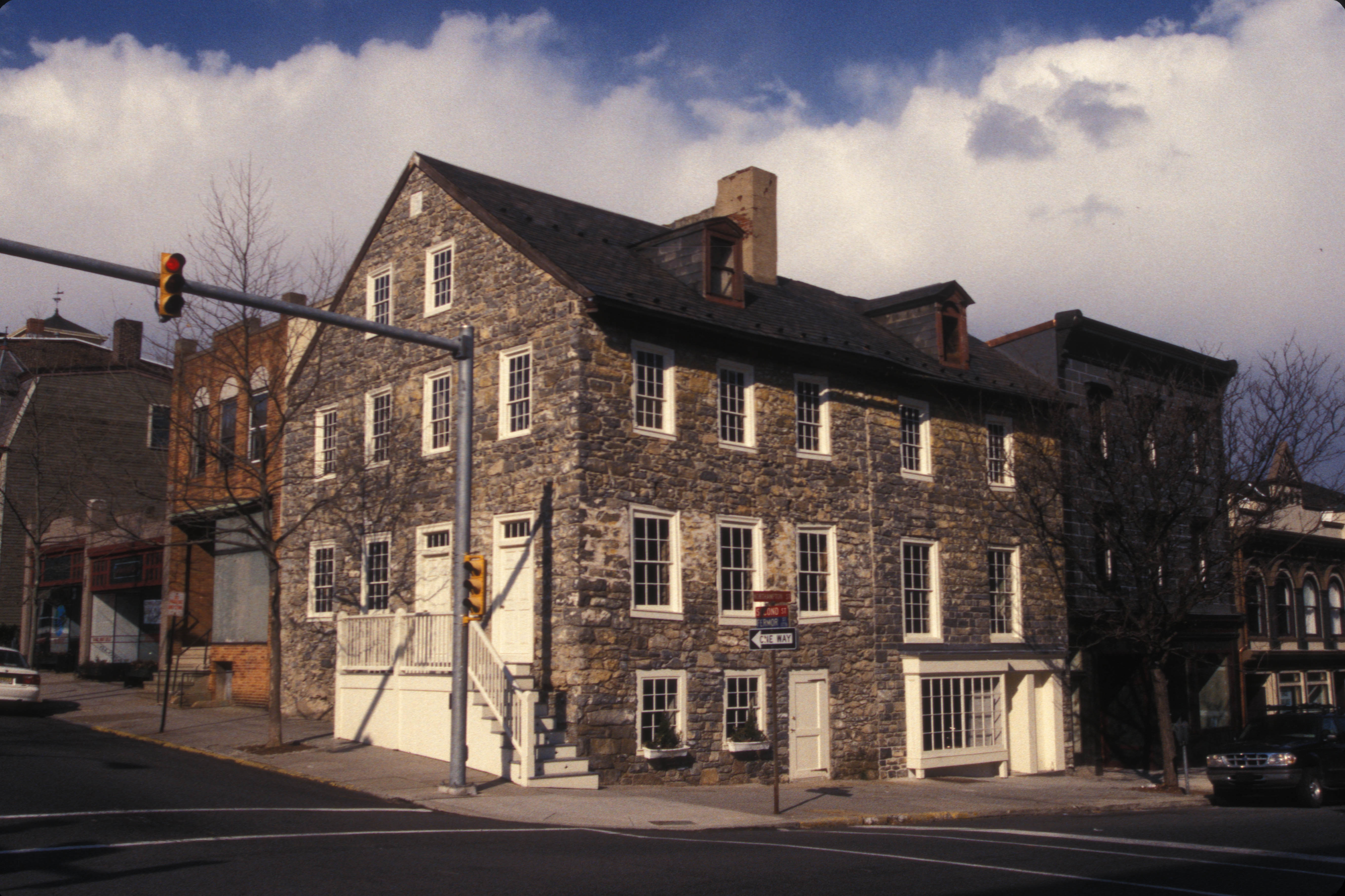

- Location within Pennsylvania Location within the United States
- Location: Roughly bounded by Riverside and Bushkill Drs., Ferry and 7th Sts., Easton, Pennsylvania
- Coordinates: 40°41′27″N 75°12′43″W
- Area: 107 acres (43 ha)
- Built: 1752
- Architect: Multiple
- Architectural style: Mixed (more Than 2 Styles From Different Periods), Late Victorian
- NRHP reference No.: 83002264
- Added to NRHP: May 6, 1983

Easton Historic District is a national historic district located in Easton in Northampton County, Pennsylvania. The district includes 405 contributing buildings in the central business district and surrounding residential areas of Easton.

Easton Historic District's buildings were primarily built between 1830 and 1910. The oldest dates back to 1752. Notable buildings include the First Reformed Church (United Church of Christ), Colonel Robert Hooper House, former Ormsby's Restaurant, First Public Library, St. John's Lutheran Church, Wolf School, Kares Building, Jacob Riegel House, Benjamin Reigel House, Detwiler House, Northampton National Bank Building, Alpha Building, Jacob Mayer Building, and Bell Telephone Building. Located in the district and separately listed are the Easton House, Parsons-Taylor House, Jacob Nicholas House, Judge Crater's Family Mansion, Jacob Mixsell House, Herman Simon House, and the State Theatre.

The district was added to the National Register of Historic Places in 1983.
