= Hermann Simon =

Hermann Simon may refer to:

- Hermann Simon (business manager) (born 1947), German author and businessperson
- Hermann Simon (historian) (born 1949), German historian
- Hermann Simon (wrestler) (1906–1987), German Greco-Roman wrestler
- Hermann Theodor Simon (1870–1918), German physicist

== See also ==
- Herman Simon House, a historic home in Easton, Pennsylvania, U.S.
