= J. Ross Baughman =

American photojournalist

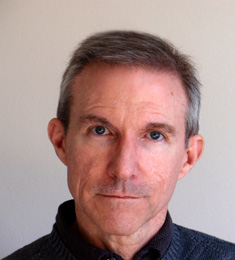
- Baughman in 2011
- Born: Dearborn, Michigan, US
- Occupations: Photojournalist; writer; educator
- Spouse(s): Jonalyn Sue Schuon, (1987-1995; divorced)
- Children: Henry Marshall Baughman

John Ross Baughman, known as J. Ross Baughman, is an American photojournalist who won a Pulitzer Prize for his portfolio showing the brutal treatment of prisoners by Rhodesian Security Forces personnel in the fall of 1977.

== Early life and photographic career ==
Baughman was born in Dearborn, Michigan, to Charles T. Baughman, an executive for the Ford Motor Company and Patricia Baughman. He attended Marion L. Steele High School in Amherst, Ohio, where he worked on the school newspaper staff and was the salutatorian of his graduating class in 1971.

After graduating from Kent State University in 1975, where in his junior year he became editor of the school yearbook, The Chestnut Burr, Baughman started work as a photojournalist for The Lorain Journal of Lorain, Ohio, about 30 miles west of Cleveland (now The Morning Journal). In 1976, while at The Journal, he infiltrated a branch of the American Nazi Party in Cleveland called the United White People's Party, and spent seven months recording both its activities and those of an affiliated group in Chicago called the National Socialist Party of America, headed by Frank Collin.

The resulting investigative series "Nazis in America" was initiated June 4, 1977, with a front page story on the murder of Chicago-area businessman Sydney Cohen by Raymond Lee Schultz, who had ties to the American Nazi Party in the 1960s and then became affiliated with the National States' Rights Party. The story also contained details about possible other murders and bombings being planned by Nazi groups. A series of five more front-page stories ran from June 12 to 16, 1977.

The Journal was invited by Richard T. Baker, professor at Columbia University and secretary to the Pulitzer Prizes advisory board, to submit the series for the 1978 Pulitzer Prizes. The series won a first place award for investigative reporting in the Ohio division of the Associated Press Managing Editors competition.

Upon leaving The Journal in 1977, Baughman moved to London and accepted a contract with the Associated Press (AP). From there he was sent to Salisbury, Rhodesia to cover the Rhodesian Bush War. While in Rhodesia, he obtained permission to accompany the Grey's Scouts, a Rhodesian Security Forces mounted infantry unit established in 1975 to combat nationalist guerrilla forces. During the two weeks he spent with the Scouts he captured photographs of troops brutalizing their prisoners. Much of his film was confiscated by Rhodesian government officials but he successfully hid several rolls and smuggled them out of the country. Three of the photographs were submitted by AP for the Pulitzer Prize for Feature Photography, which Baughman won—at age 23, the youngest professional to win a journalism Pulitzer.

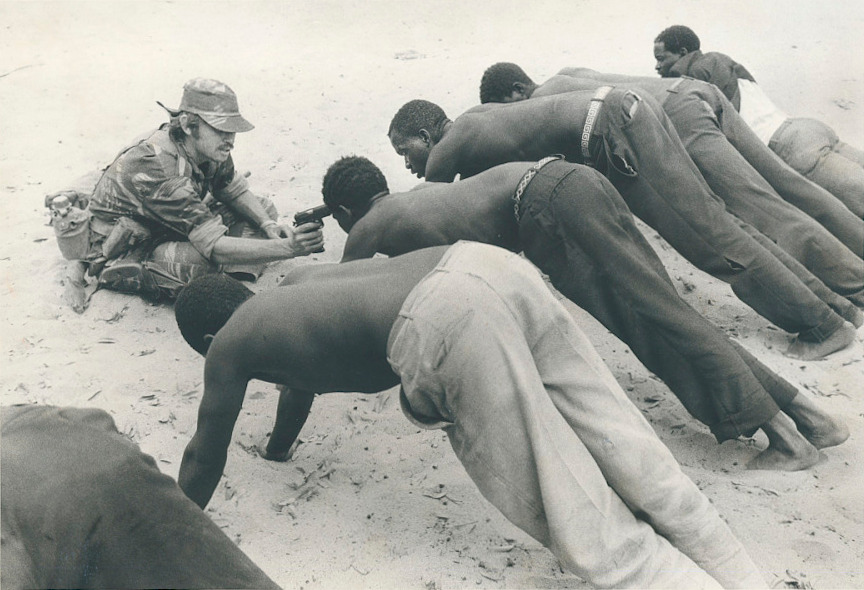
One of J. Ross Baughman's Pulitzer Prize winning photos.

== Rhodesian photo debate ==
The release of the photographs on December 2, 1977 created a furore among both Rhodesian government officials and Baughman's fellow journalists, with the government claiming inaccuracies in the written report that accompanied the photos and journalists questioning both the means by which the photos were acquired and their authenticity.

In order to accompany the Scouts, Baughman had to prove he could ride a horse and was required to carry a weapon and wear an Army uniform, thus making himself indistinguishable from the troops. In addition, he presented himself as sympathetic to the aims of the Rhodesian government and military. While the AP stood behind the authenticity of the photographs, and Rhodesian government officials never questioned them, AP General Manager Keith Fuller expressed doubts about Baughman's methods of acquiring them. Enough speculation was raised that the photographs were withdrawn from consideration for the Robert Capa Gold Medal Award of the Overseas Press Club after the Club's Annual Awards Committee meeting in February 1978. When the same photos won the Pulitzer only weeks later several members of the Overseas Press Club jury apologized for their decision, stating that lack of information about the circumstances under which the photos were taken led them to their conclusion.

In September 2010 Baughman donated his Pulitzer Prize certificate, one of the cameras he used in Rhodesia and a number of prints made from the film he shot there to the Smithsonian Institution National Museum of American History, along with other photos and artifacts collected from his career.

== Career after the Pulitzer ==
While the debate over the Rhodesian photographs took place in the United States, Baughman continued to work for AP overseas, where he was subsequently sent to the Cairo, Egypt bureau and spent two days in March 1978 photographing a raid on Israeli forces in southern Lebanon conducted by the Democratic Front for the Liberation of Palestine, a Marxist guerilla group.

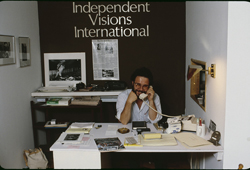
Visions photo agency front lobby.

Baughman worked for AP until the end of May 1978. In June he and two partners, Mark Greenberg and Stephen Schneider, founded the Visions photo agency as part of Independent Visions International in New York City.

Visions specialized in investigative photo features which were mainly published by premier news magazines. While working for Visions, Baughman completed a number of assignments for Newsweek, Life magazine, and other major magazines. He remained with the agency as a senior partner until 1996.

=== Injury in El Salvador ===
On March 3, 1982, while Baughman and photojournalist James Nachtwey were on assignment in El Salvador covering the Salvadoran Civil War for Newsweek, he tripped a land mine while trying locate guerrilla forces. The accident resulted in severe injuries to Baughman's left leg and minor injuries to Nachtwey. Baughman would later call for changes in the way journalists were assigned to cover such wars, after the death of another photojournalist, John Hoagland. He suggested that editors assign journalists to cover only one side of the conflict at a time, thus eliminating the risks of traveling between enemy lines.

=== Leaving the press pool in Grenada ===
On October 28, 1983, while on assignment for Newsweek during the invasion of Grenada, Baughman left the press pool that had been formed by the U.S. Government as a means of protesting the tight restrictions that had been placed on journalists covering the invasion. He called leaving the pool a "matter of civil disobedience" and spent three days on the island. On October 29, a spokesman for the Joint Information Bureau announced that Newsweek would no longer be included in the press pool. Editor Maynard Parker, while stating that he felt the press restrictions were "totally outrageous and unnecessary", also said that Newsweek would curtail further dealings with Baughman on the assignment. Nevertheless Baughman's photo of a visit to the island by Chairman of the Joint Chiefs of Staff John William Vessey Jr. did appear in Newsweek.

=== Work for Life magazine ===
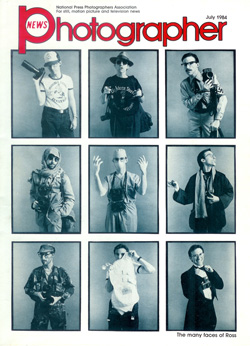
J. Ross Baughman shows the clothing he wore while working on a variety of investigative reports.

From 1980 to 1996 while with Visions, Baughman was assigned a number of investigative photo essay projects for Life magazine, including the following:

- "No Haven for the Last of Cuba's Outcasts" (November 1980, with reporter Steve Robinson), which examined the issues surrounding the Marielito boat refugees from Cuba being detained at Fort Chaffee, Arkansas.
- "Saturday Night in El Barrio" (May 1982, with reporter David Friend), which focused on the lives of members of the 18th Street Gang in Los Angeles.
- "The Double Closet" (May 1983, with writer Anne Fadiman), about two gay fathers raising their four children in a combined household.
- "A Haven for AIDS Outcasts" (January 1984, self-reported with later writing by Dianna Waggoner), covering the first hospice for terminally ill AIDS patients in San Francisco.
- "Hunting Parole Violators" (July 1984 with reporter Ed Barnes), following undercover detectives in New York City hunt for parole violators in an environment made more dangerous by the 'three strikes' laws.
- "Disarmers of Terror: The World's Busiest Bomb Squad" (December 1984 with reporter David Friend), describing the work of Israel Defense Forces in Jerusalem in disabling terrorist bombs.

=== The Washington Times ===
In 1999, Baughman accepted the position of photo editor at The Washington Times, being promoted to deputy director of photography in June 2000, director of photography in March 2003 and finally senior editor, overseeing television, radio and new media development.

Baughman also contributed regularly to the print and online editions as a columnist and literary critic, before leaving in December 2009. During this time, The Washington Times photography staff was a finalist for the Breaking News Photography Pulitzer in 2003 for its coverage of the Washington, D.C. Beltway sniper story and Mary F. Calvert was a Feature Photography finalist in 2007 for her depiction of sub-Saharan African women afflicted with fistula after childbirth.

== Journalistic ethics work ==
Baughman has lectured extensively on the subject of journalistic ethics and methods, including programs at the Smithsonian Institution, the International Center of Photography, and the Rhode Island School of Design, along with other major American universities such as Columbia University, Dartmouth College, and Rutgers University.

In lectures and interviews, he has expressed the belief that it is a journalist's duty to record events with as little disruption or interference in those events as possible, even in circumstances where there is danger to the subject. In 2003 while at The Washington Times, he assisted in revising the National Press Photographers Association Code of Ethics, which was officially adopted by the NPPA Board in July 2004.

== Teaching ==
Baughman was on the faculty of the photo department at the New School for Social Research and Parson's School of Design in New York City from 1979 to 1997. He was an adjunct professor for the University of Missouri Graduate Program in Journalism in New York City from 1984 to 1986, and also taught at New York University from 1980 to 1982. In addition he was a co-founder and program director for the Focus Photography Symposiums in New York City from 1981 to 1988.

== Gallery ==
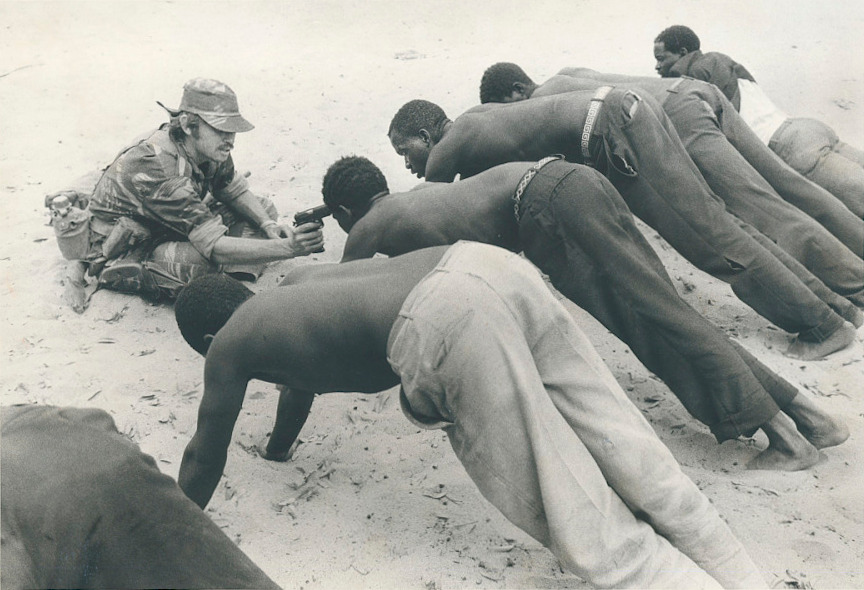
A Rhodesian soldier questioning villagers near the border of Botswana in the fall of 1977. Taken for Associated Press. First of three photos that were awarded a 1978 Pulitzer Prize.

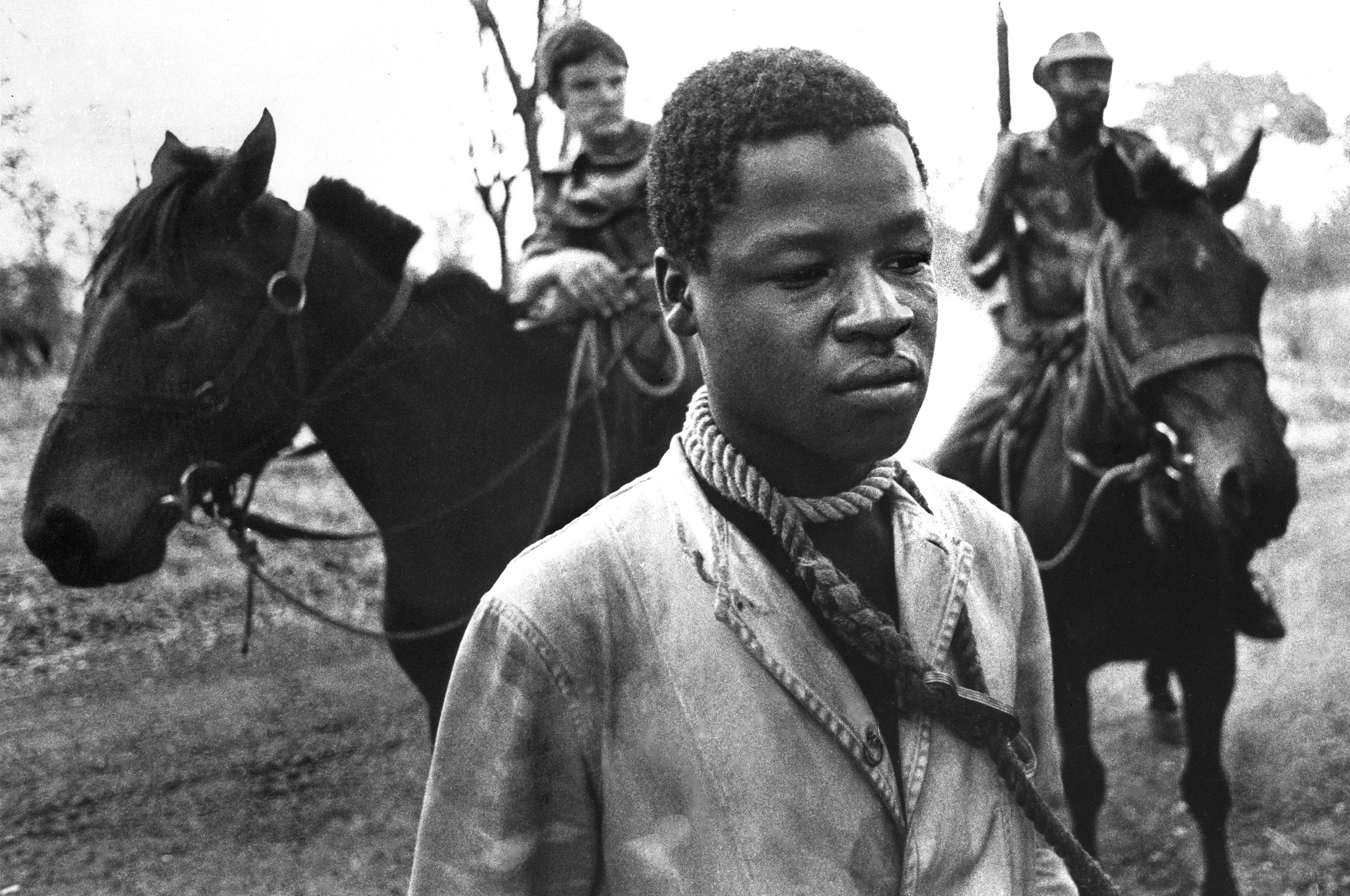
A prisoner taken by Rhodesian Security Forces in the fall of 1977 stands with a rope around his neck. Taken for Associated Press. Second of three photos that were awarded a 1978 Pulitzer Prize.

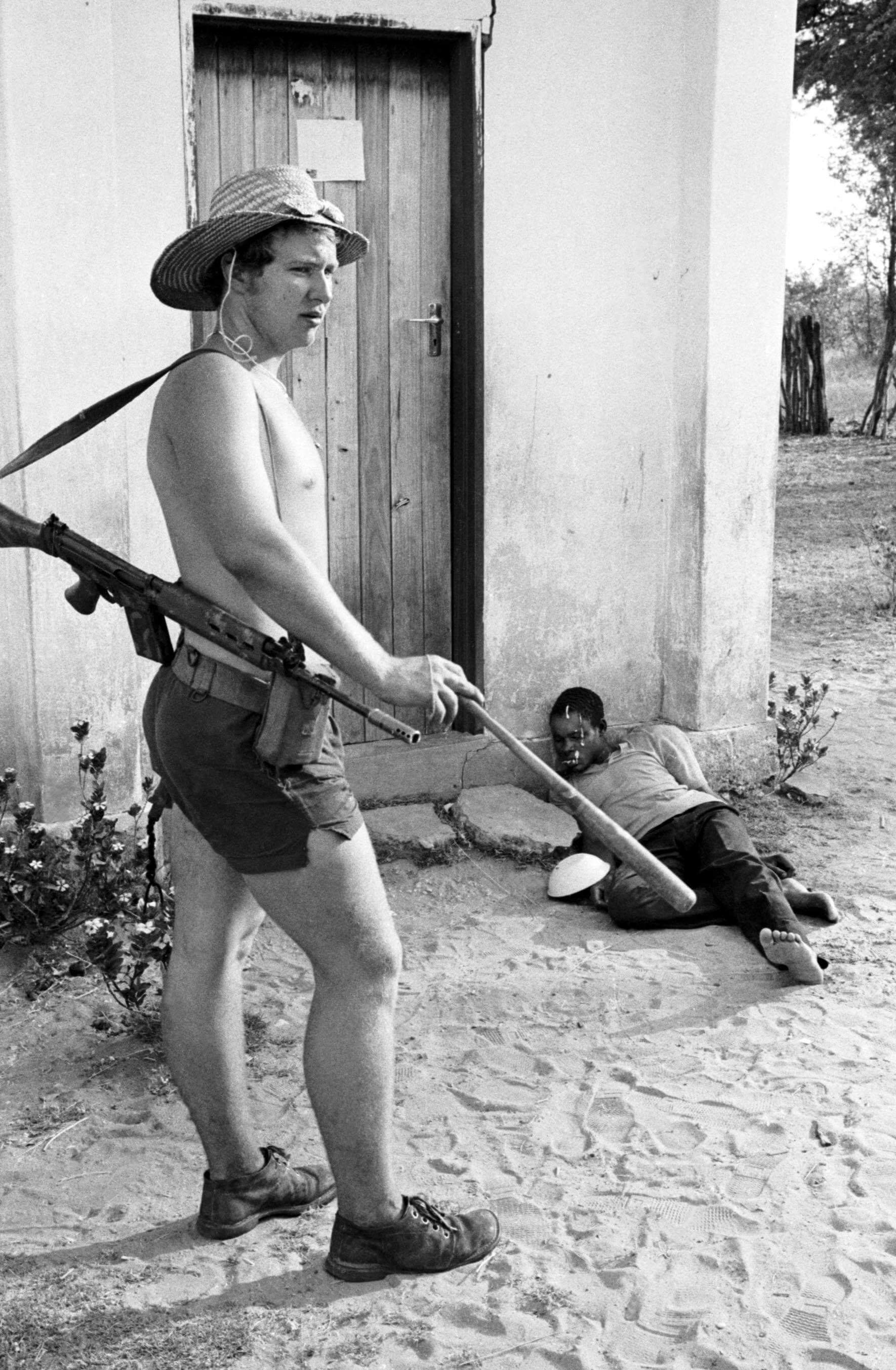
A Rhodesian Security Forces soldier swings a bat in front of a beaten prisoner in the fall of 1977. Taken for Associated Press. Third of three photos that were awarded a 1978 Pulitzer Prize.

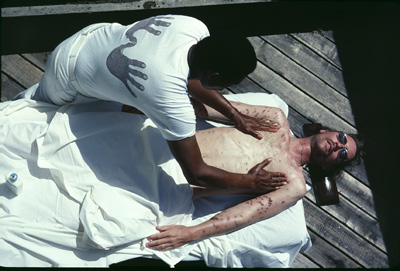
A terminally ill AIDS patient in San Francisco gets a therapeutic massage meant to prolong the use of his rapidly deteriorating muscles.

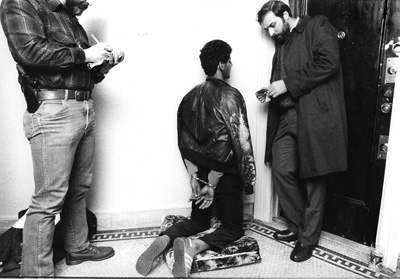
Police detectives read the Miranda rights to a fugitive felon, a suspect who risks life imprisonment after New York State passed a Three Strikes law.

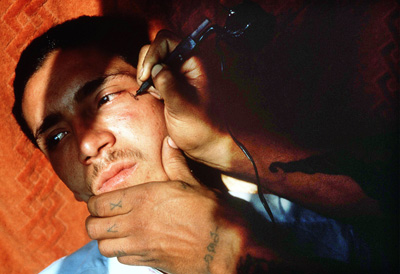
Freshly tattooed teardrops signify his stints in prison for a young member of the 18th Street Gang in Los Angeles.

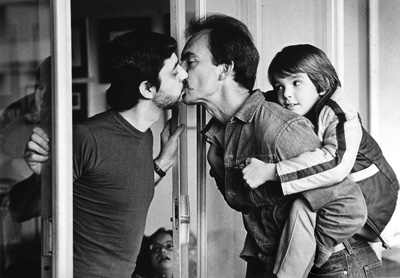
Gay dads balance their political activism with the needs of their children.

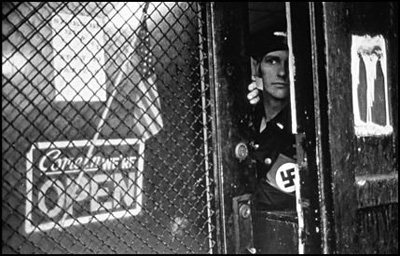
The lieutenant in charge of security checks suspicious car license plates outside a Nazi bookshop in Cleveland, Ohio.

== Other interests ==
From 1989 to 2005, Baughman wrote five non-fiction history books on topics ranging from folk art to the Protestant Reformation and the American colonial era. Until April 2009, he also served as curator of colonial history collections at the Bachmann Publick House, a museum in Easton, Pennsylvania. This same collection of family artifacts is now exhibited at the Woodstock Museum of Shenandoah County, Virginia. In addition, he was one of the earliest proponents and administrators of Y-chromosome genetic testing for genealogical purposes.

== Books by J. Ross Baughman ==
- Graven Images: a Thematic Portfolio, 1976. A series of individual images depicting themes of childhood, courtship, marriage, old age and death. ASIN B0006CVB2S.
- Forbidden Images: a Secret Portfolio, 1977. A series of photo essays depicting people on the fringes of society (Ku Klux Klan members, transvestites, carnival sideshow workers, the institutionalized mentally ill). ASIN B0006CP7FA .
- Some Ancestors of the Baughman Family in America: tracing back twelve generations from Switzerland through Virginia, & c. growing along with the nation, across its heartland, 1989. Genealogical history of the Baughman family. ISBN 978-0917968174.
- Harvest Time: being several essays on the history of the Swiss, German & Dutch folk in early America named Baughman, Layman, Moyer, Huff, and others across New York, Pennsylvania, Virginia, Tennessee, Missouri, Arkansas, and four centuries, 1994. Family history focused on colonial American history in New York, Pennsylvania and Virginia. ISBN 978-0917968181.
- Apart from the World: an account of the origins and destinies of various Swiss Mennonites who fled from their homelands in remote parts of Cantons Zurich, Aargau and Bern, 1997. Centers on histories of medieval Europe, the Protestant Reformation and its impact on the New World. ISBN 0917968190.
- A Lake Beneath the Crescent Moon: some of the history, legends & folkart from around Zurich, ranging from prehistoric times through the 18th century: along with the families thereabout named Bachman, Hiestand, Ringger & Strickler, 2000. Centers on mythology and folk art. ISBN 0917968212.
- The Chain Rejoined: or the bonds of science and mystery amongst family, including many attempts to recover ties across the Atlantic Ocean to ancestors and cousins of Baughmans and Bachmans, 2005. Focuses on cycles of justice and injustice among the races throughout European and American history. ISBN 978-0917968228.
- Angle: Fighting Censorship, Death Threats, Ethical Traps and a Land Mine, While Winning a Pulitzer Along the Way, 2014. Memoir. ISBN 978-0615840758.
