= Easton Historic District =

Easton Historic District may refer to:

- Easton Historic District (Easton, Maryland), listed on the NRHP in Maryland
- North Easton Historic District, Easton, Massachusetts, listed on the NRHP in Massachusetts
- Easton Historic District (Easton, Pennsylvania), listed on the NRHP in Pennsylvania
