= Bethlehem Armory =

- U.S. National Register of Historic Places
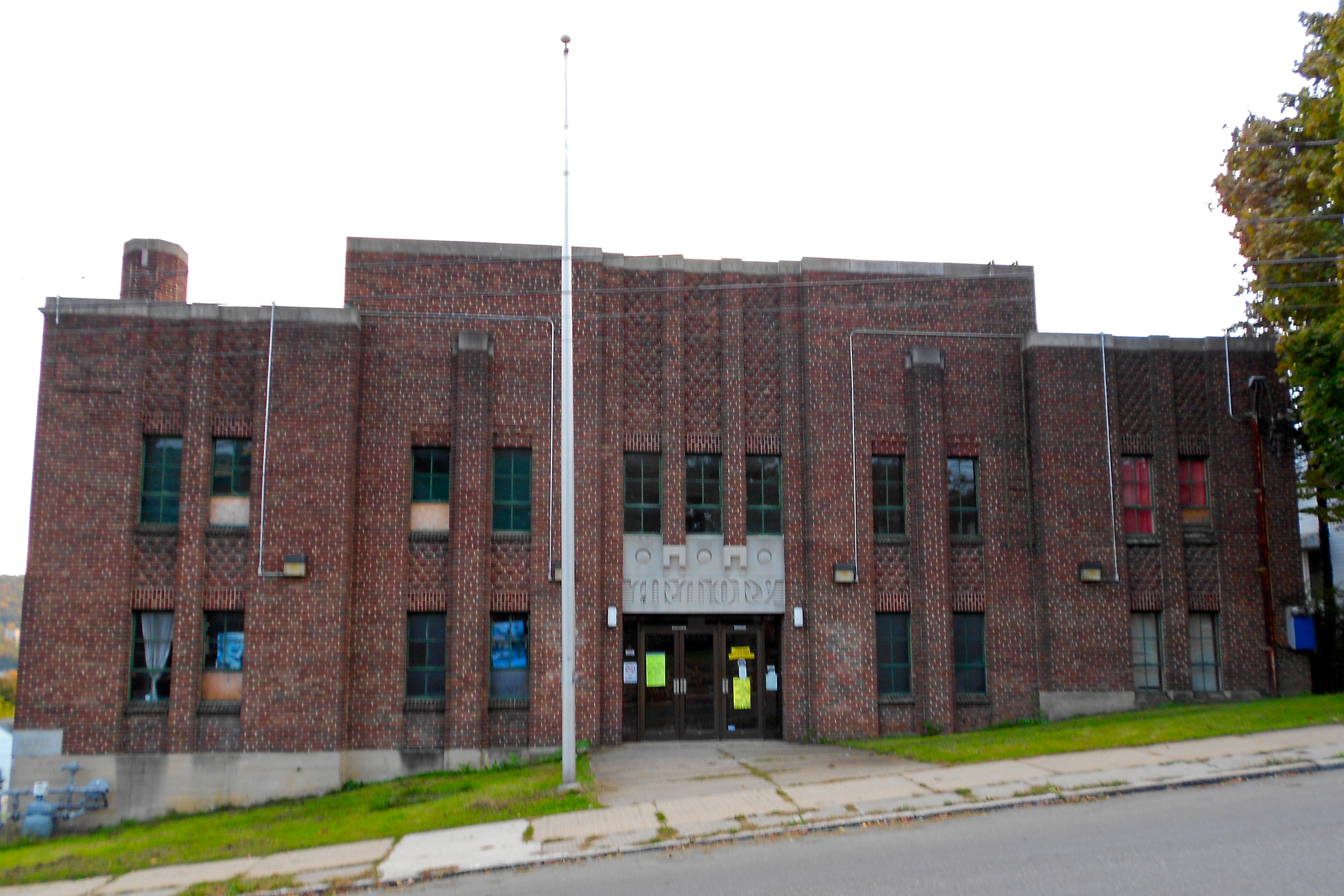
- Bethlehem Armory, October 2012

- Location within Pennsylvania Location within the United States
- Location: 301 Prospect St., Bethlehem, Pennsylvania, U.S.
- Coordinates: 40°37′9″N 75°23′16″W
- Area: 1.7 acres (0.69 ha)
- Built: 1930
- Architect: Lovelace & Spillman; Yundt, George E.
- Architectural style: Art Deco
- MPS: Pennsylvania National Guard Armories MPS
- NRHP reference No.: 91001693
- Added to NRHP: November 14, 1991

Bethlehem Armory also known as Floyd Simons Armory, is a historic National Guard armory located in Bethlehem in Lehigh County, Pennsylvania. It was built in 1930, and is an "I"-plan brick building in three sections. It consists of a two-story administration building, drill hall, and kitchen / locker room executed in the Art Deco style. It measures 82 by 102 feet (25 by 31 m), and has a hipped roof. Additions were built in 1938 and 1968.

It was added to the National Register of Historic Places in 1991.

== Gallery ==
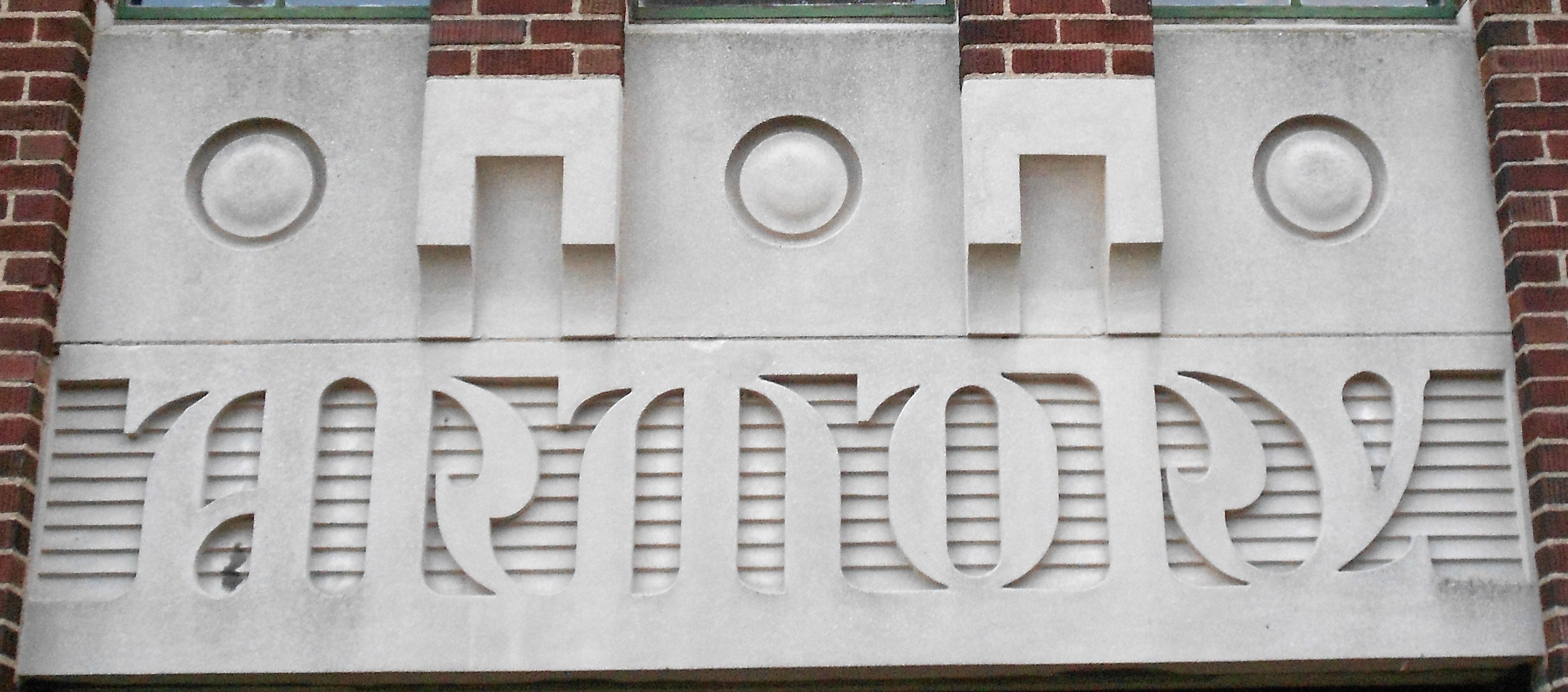
Bethlehem Armory entrance, October 2012

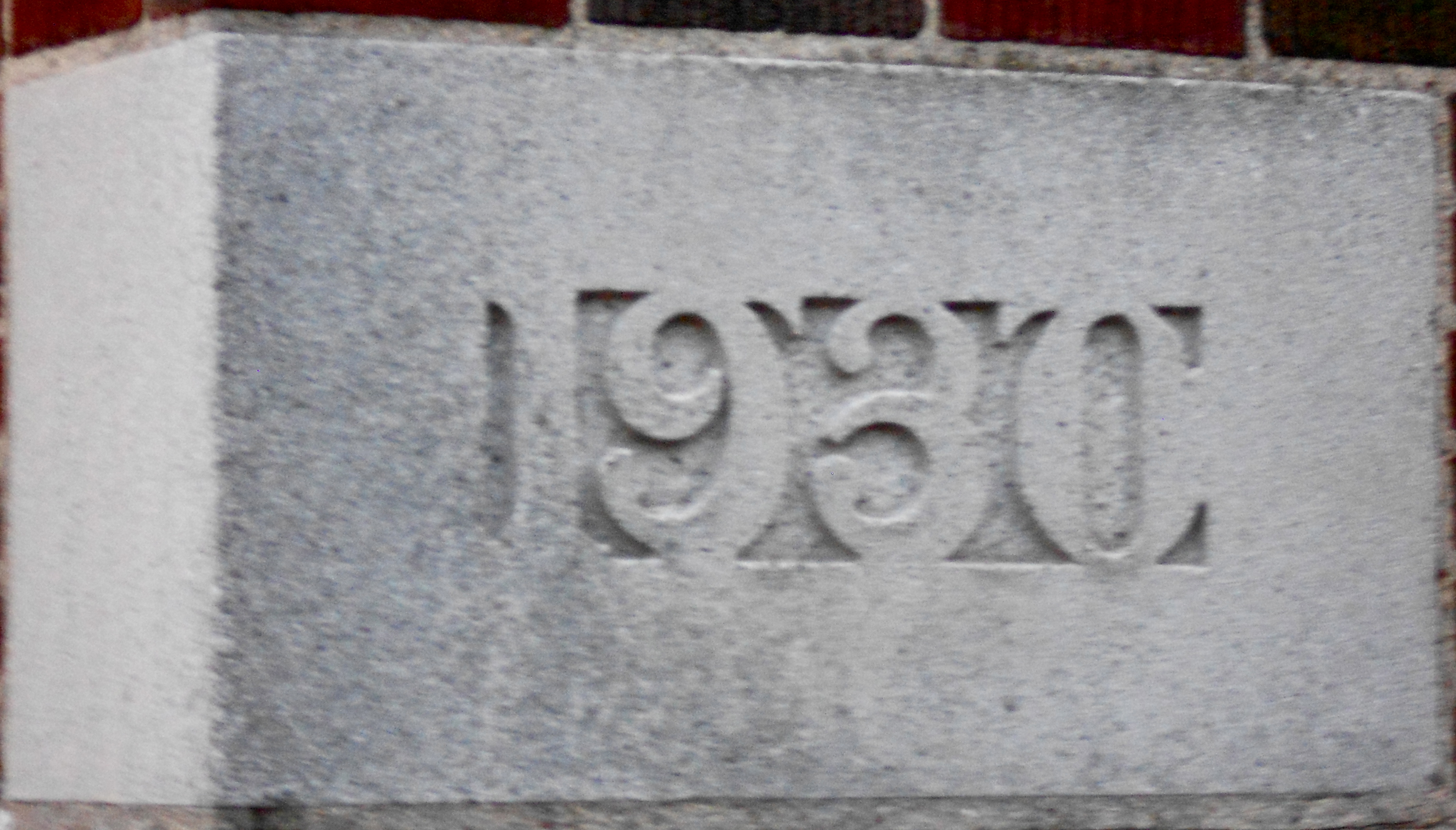
1930 cornerstone
