= Pennsylvania Railroad Freight Building =

- U.S. National Register of Historic Places
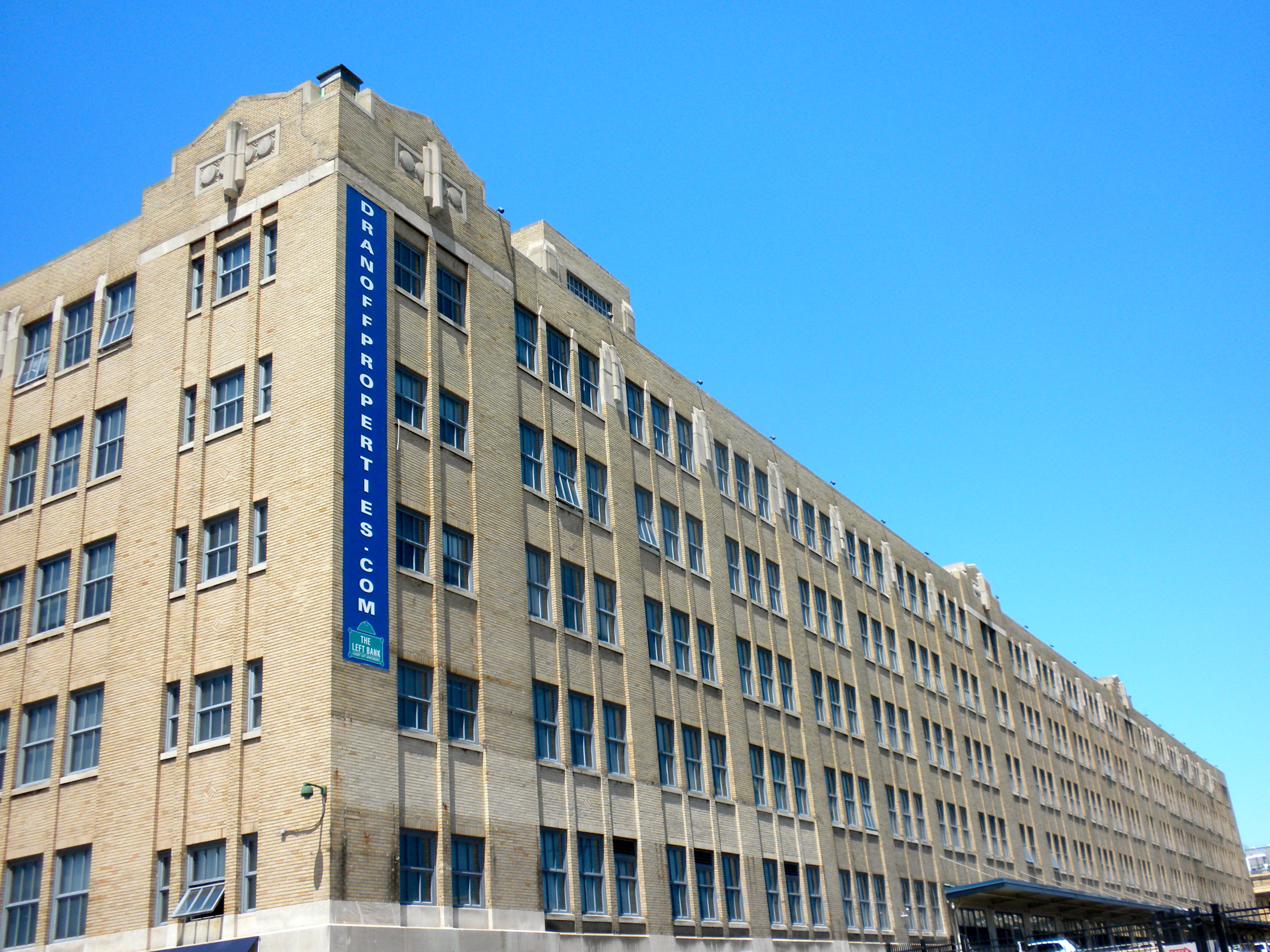
- Pennsylvania Railroad Freight Building, May 2010

- Location within Philadelphia Location within Pennsylvania Location within the United States
- Location: 3118-3198 Chestnut Street; Philadelphia, Pennsylvania
- Coordinates: 39°57′13″N 75°11′14″W
- Area: 2 acres (0.81 ha)
- Built: 1929
- Architect: United Engineers & Constructors
- Architectural style: Art Deco
- NRHP reference No.: 99001291
- Added to NRHP: October 28, 1999

The Pennsylvania Railroad Freight Building is an historic freight station, warehouse and showroom building in the University City neighborhood of Philadelphia, Pennsylvania, United States.

It was added to the National Register of Historic Places in 1999.

== History and architectural features ==
Built by the Pennsylvania Railroad in 1929, this historic structure is a six-story, flat-roofed building that was designed in the Art Deco style. Each floor contains approximately 88,000 square feet. The first floor is clad in limestone and the upper stories are of buff-colored brick.

From 1956 to 1993, this building was the GE Re-entry Systems facility, where "thousands of engineers and technicians who solved the problem of vehicles successfully reentering the Earth's atmosphere" for NASA. Among the achievements of the men and women working at the facility was "the recovery of the first man-made object from orbit," a unique milestone for humanity.

Generations of University of Pennsylvania and Drexel University students who worked there know it as "The GE Building." It was added to the National Register of Historic Places in 1999.

For this work, The American Institute of Aeronautics and Astronautics (AIAA) designated it as an Historic Aerospace Site in 2007.

The building has been converted to residential use and is now known as the Left Bank.

== Gallery ==
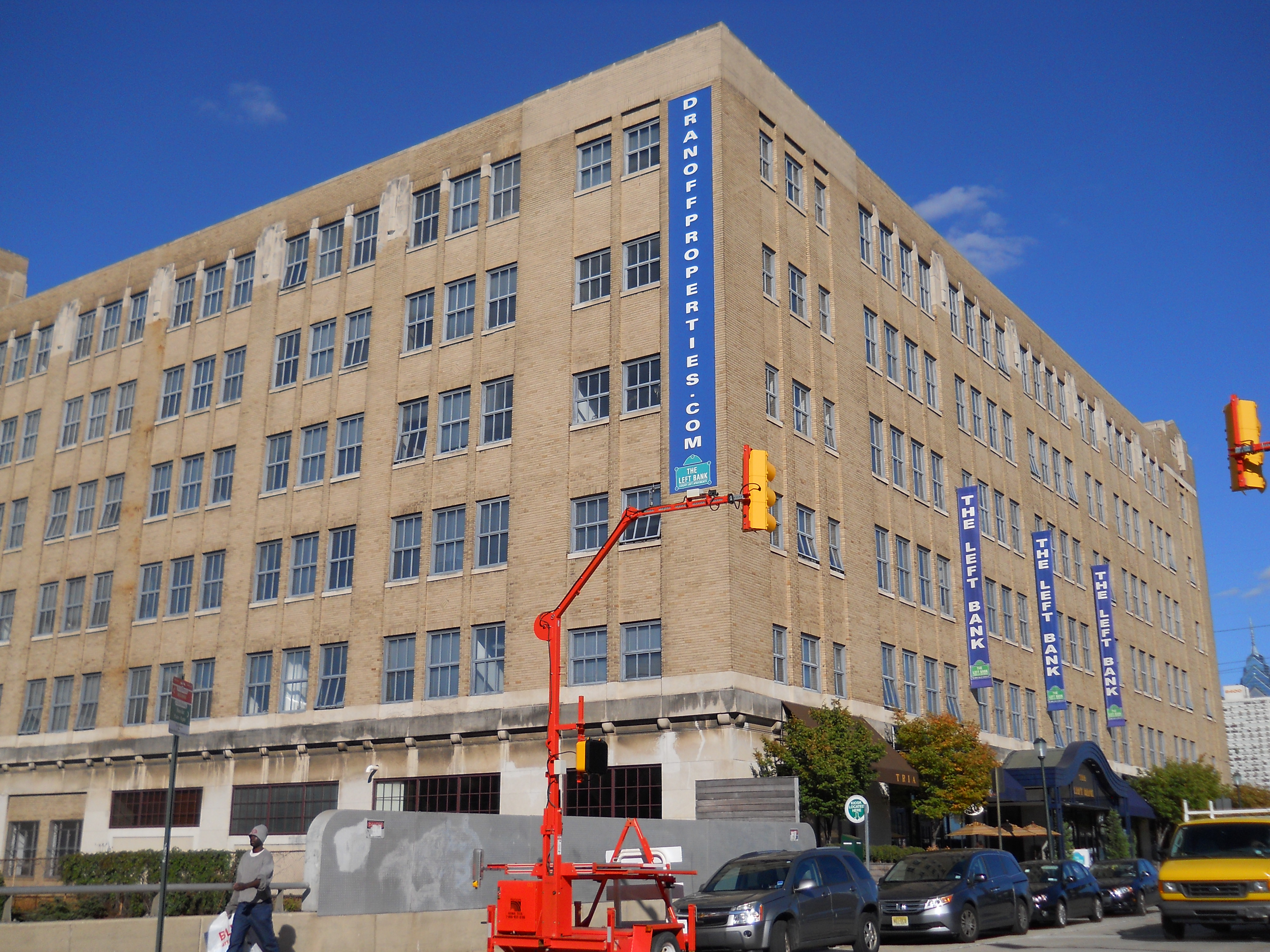
SW corner

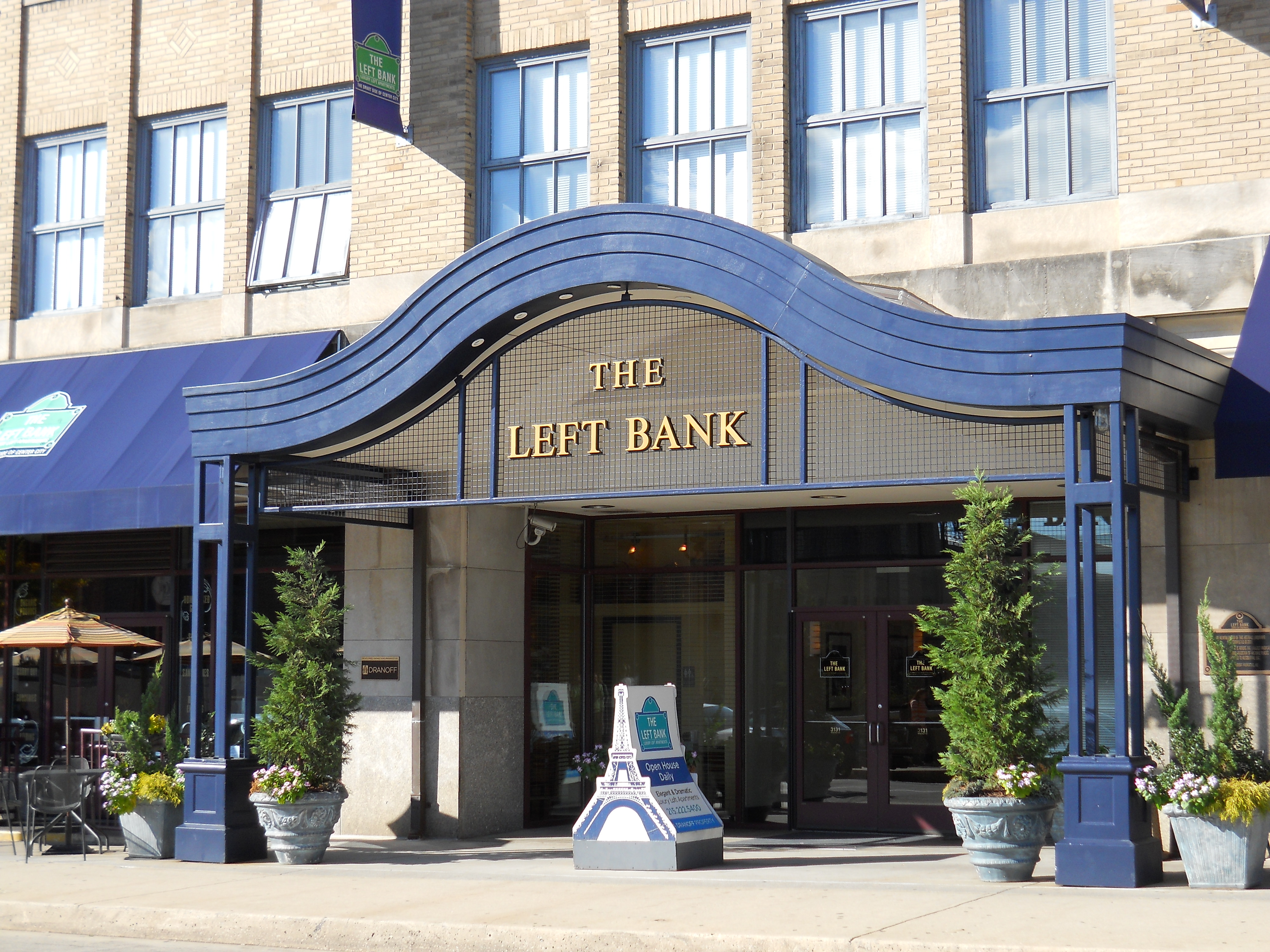
Walnut Street Entrance

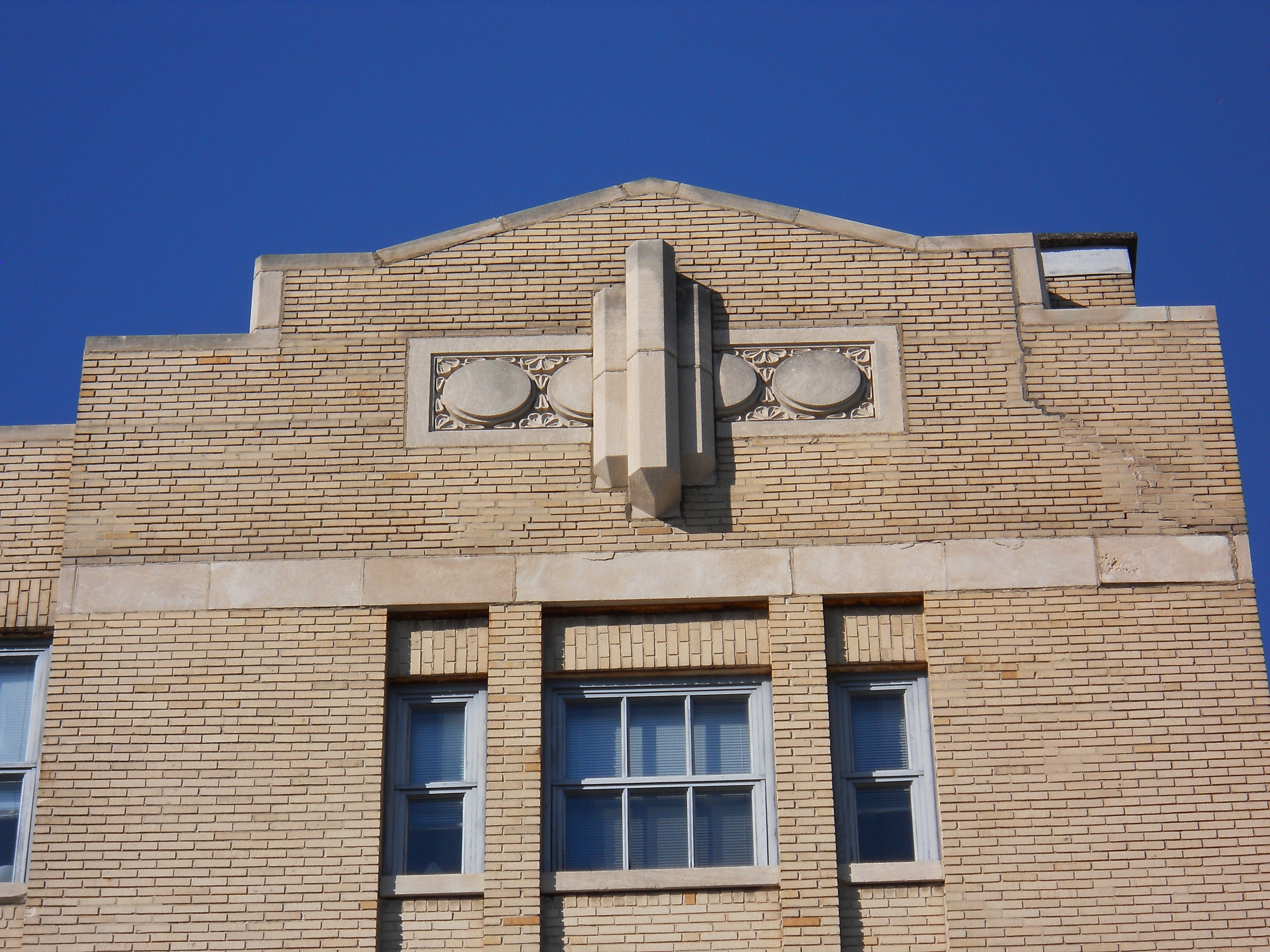
Art Deco detail
