= Hajoca Corporation Headquarters and Showroom =

Historic place in Massachusetts, United States

- U.S. National Register of Historic Places
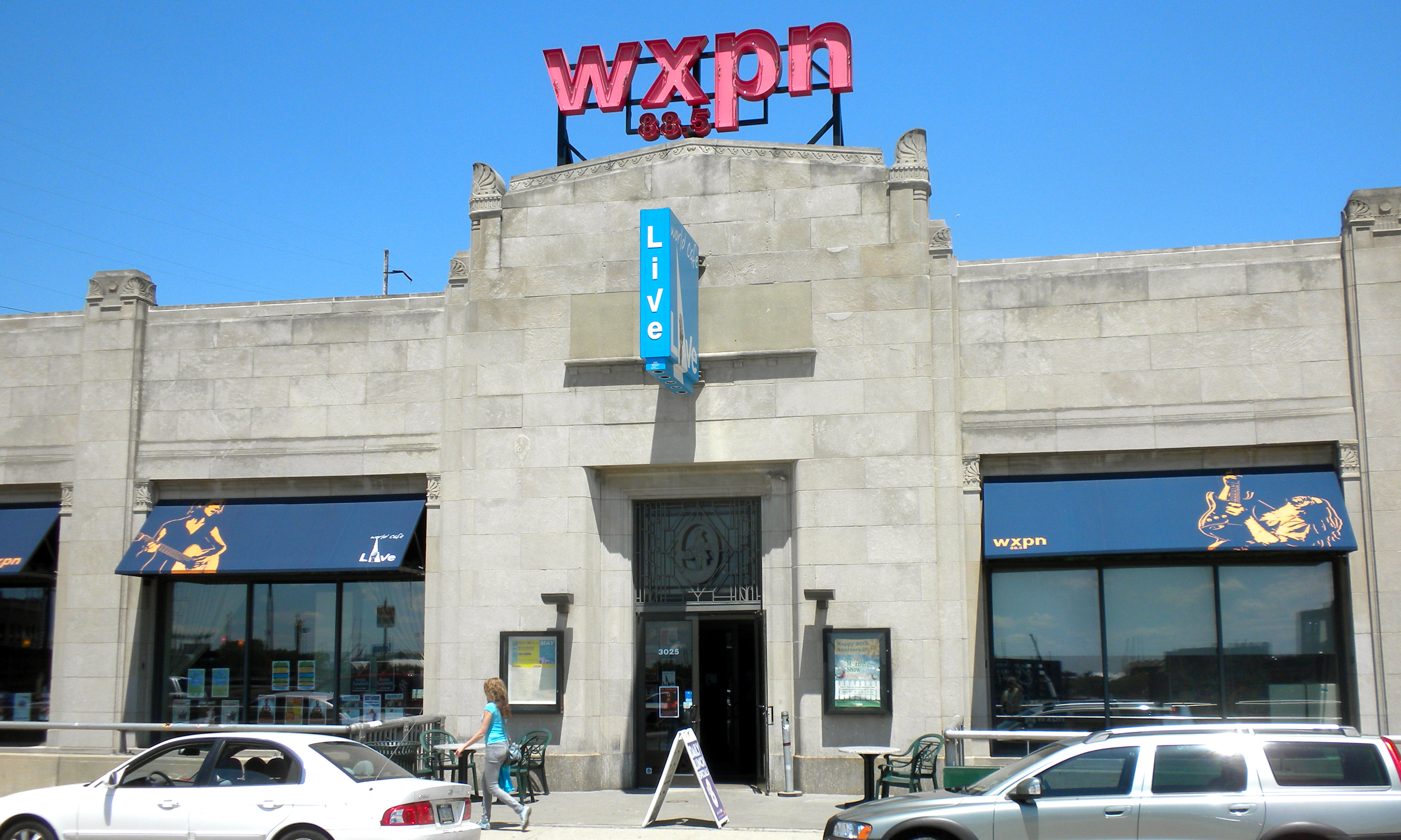
- Hajoca Corporation Headquarters and Showroom, May 2010

- Location within Philadelphia Location within Pennsylvania Location within the United States
- Location: 3025 Walnut St., Philadelphia, Pennsylvania
- Coordinates: 39°57′9″N 75°11′8″W
- Area: less than one acre
- Built: 1921, 1930
- Architect: Wunder, Clarence E.
- Architectural style: Art Deco
- NRHP reference No.: 03000079
- Added to NRHP: February 27, 2003

The Hajoca Corporation Headquarters and Showroom is an historic commercial building which is located in the University City neighborhood of Philadelphia, Pennsylvania.

It was added to the National Register of Historic Places in 2003.

== History and architectural features ==
The original section of this historic structure was built in 1921, and was then expanded in 1930. It is a two-story, flat-roofed building, which was designed in the Art Deco style. It is clad in limestone and features decorative brickwork. The building houses WXPN radio and the World Cafe Live, a live music venue dedicated to showcasing live music.

== Gallery ==
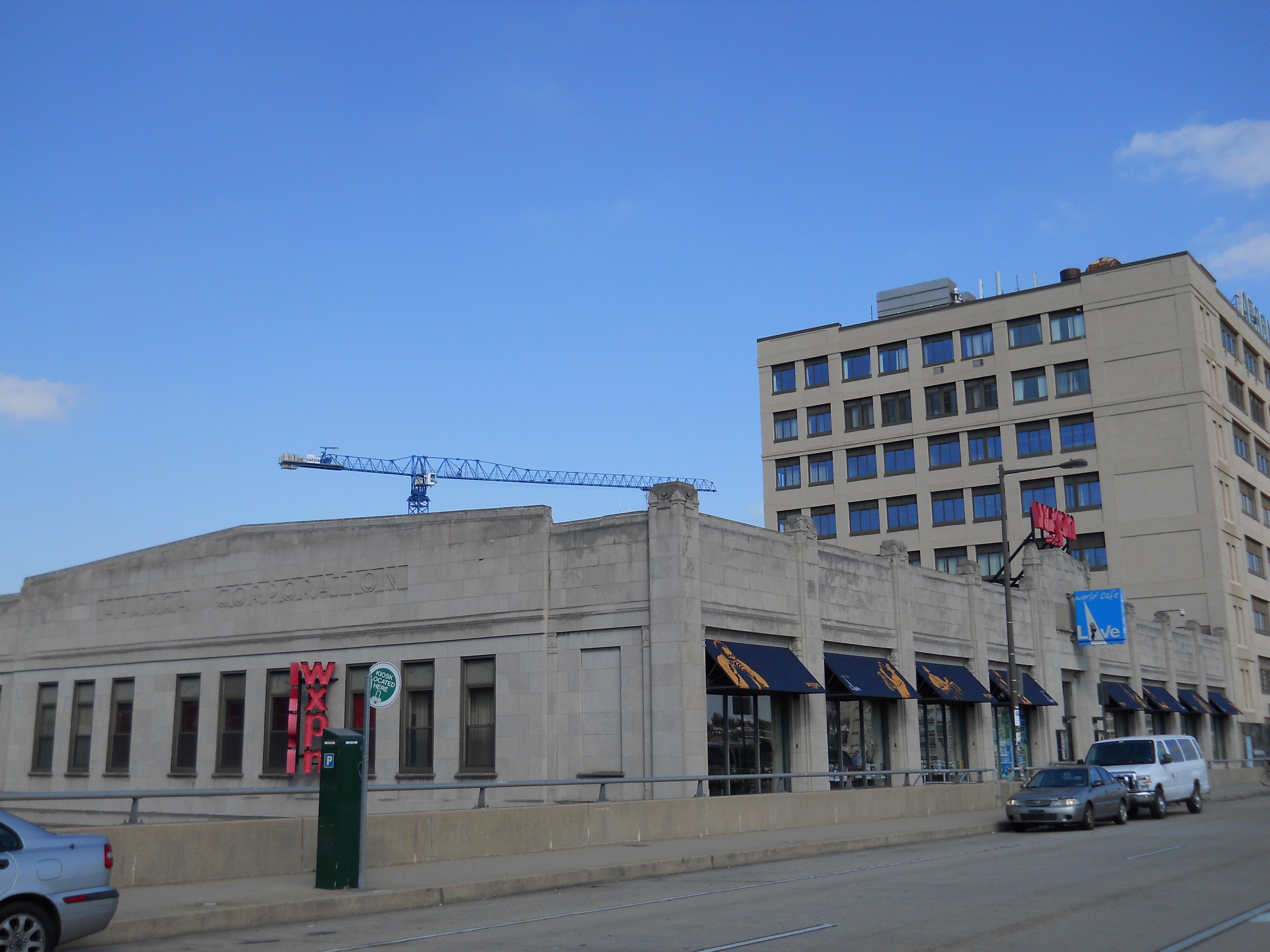
View from Walnut St.

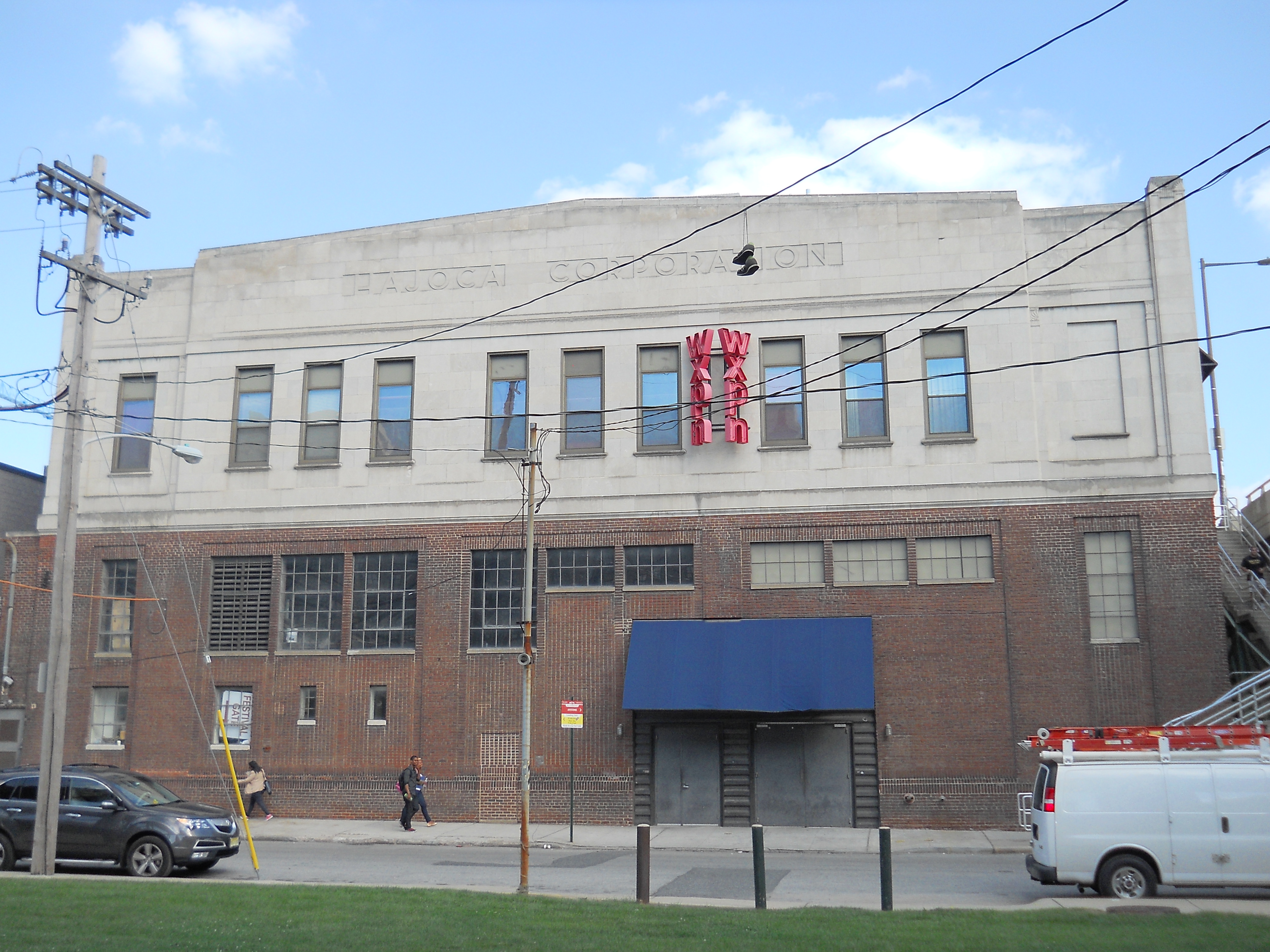
West side, 31st St. Red brick section (1921) and ArtDeco limestone first floor (1930).

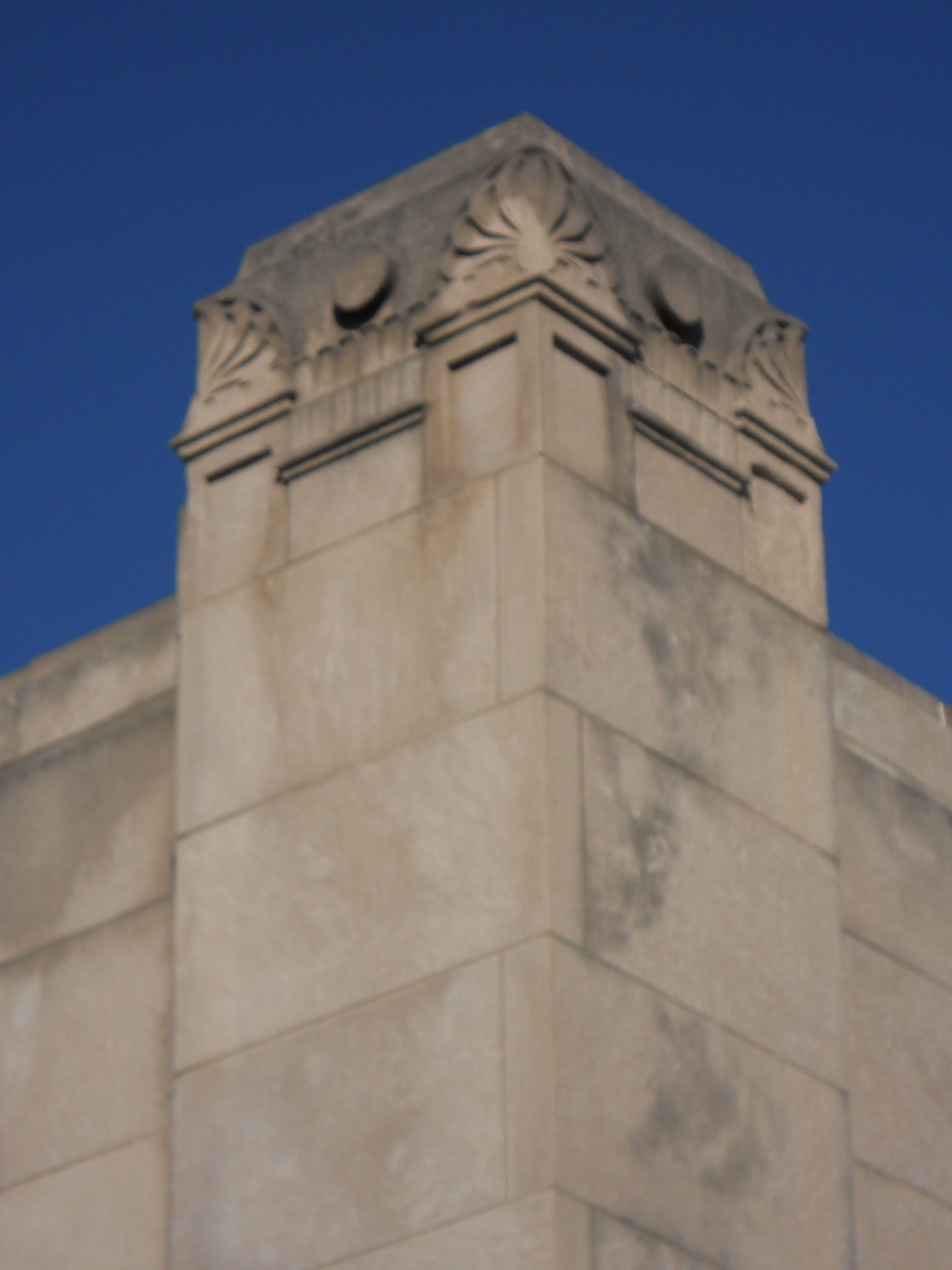
ArtDeco roof corner.

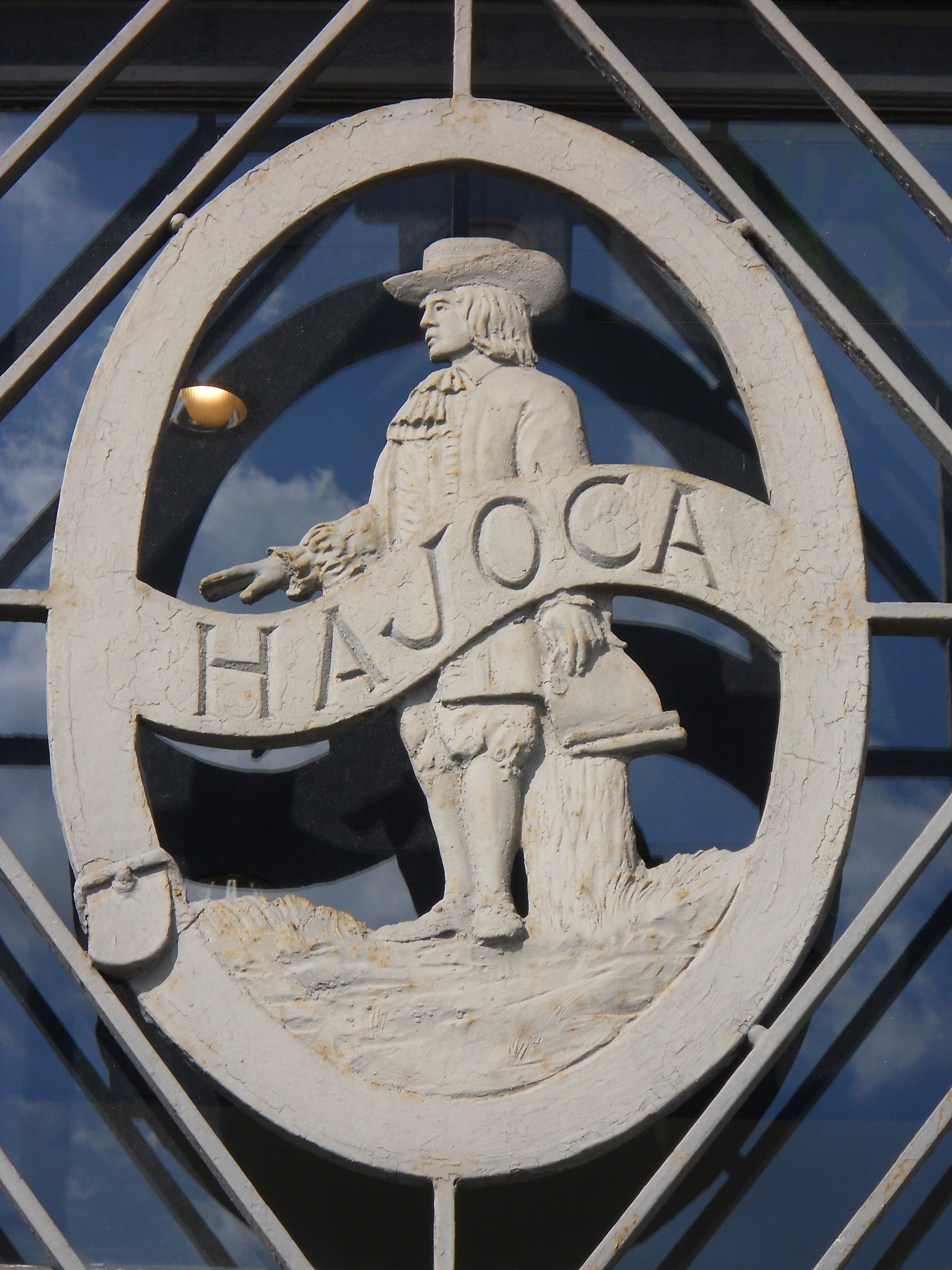
Hajoca Corp. logo over the main entrance.
