= Jacob Nicholas House =

Historic house in Pennsylvania, United States

- U.S. National Register of Historic Places
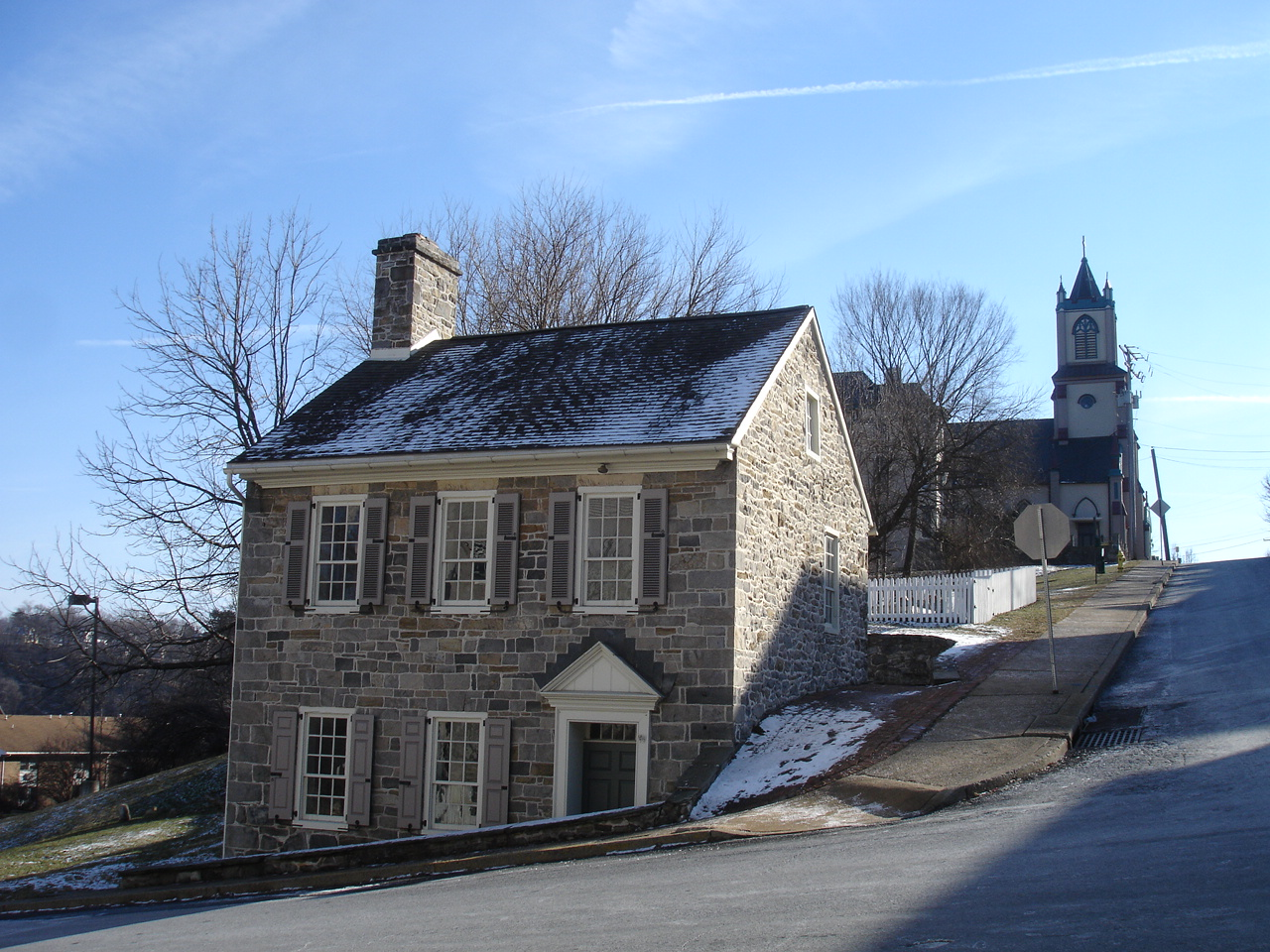
- The Jacob Nicholas House in January, 2013

- Location within Pennsylvania Location within the United States
- Location: 458 Ferry St., Easton, Pennsylvania
- Coordinates: 40°41′22″N 75°12′47″W
- Area: 0.1 acres (0.040 ha)
- Built: c. 1750
- Architectural style: Bank House
- NRHP reference No.: 76001658
- Added to NRHP: November 21, 1976

Jacob Nicholas House, also known as the Little Stone House Museum, is a historic home located at Easton, Northampton County, Pennsylvania. It was built about 1750, and is a 2 1/2-story, three bay stone building. It has a rear frame clapboard addition built about 1840. It is built into an incline.

It was added to the National Register of Historic Places in 1976.
