= Morton, Philadelphia =

Morton
- Neighborhood of Philadelphia
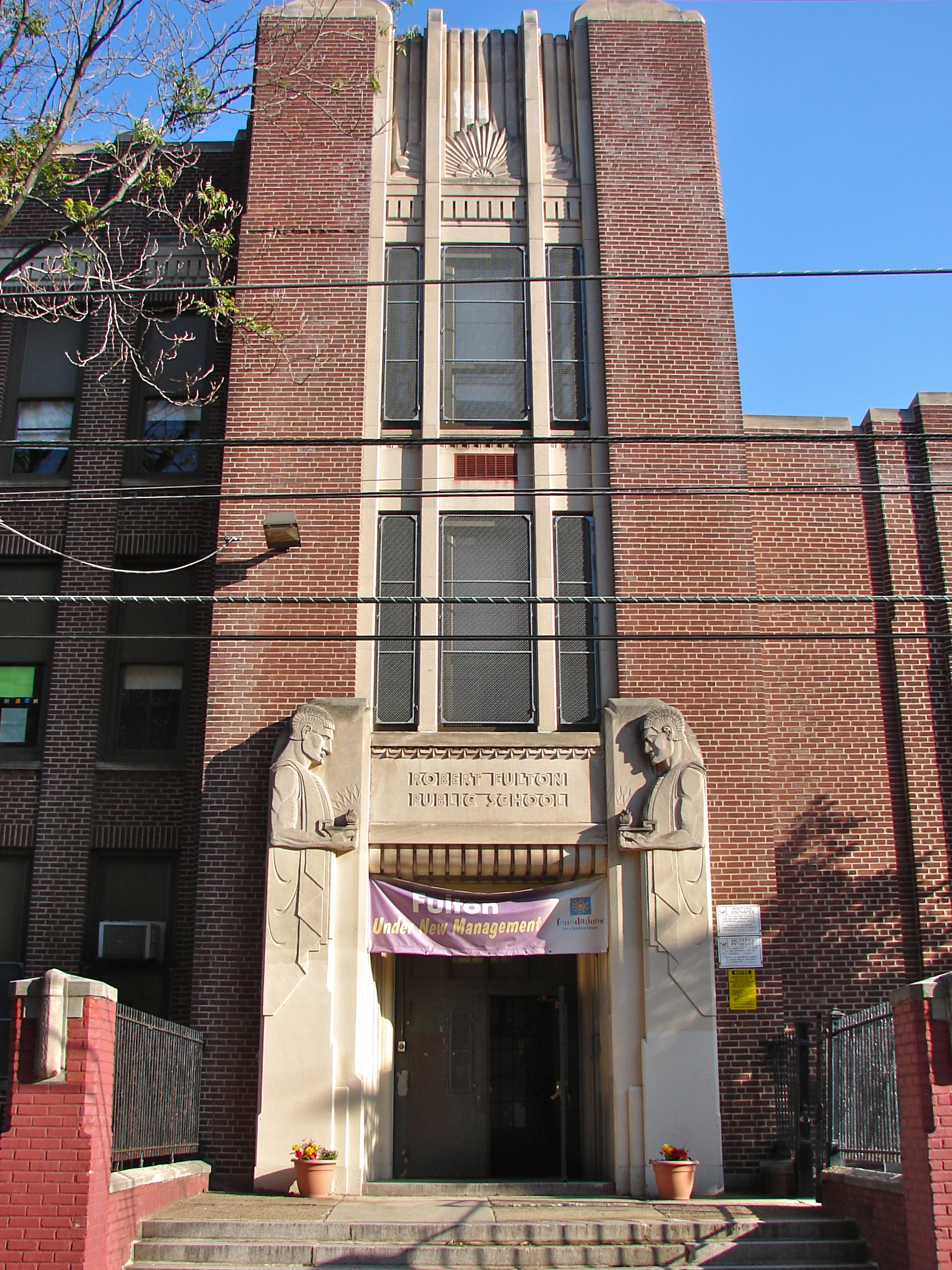
- The Robert Fulton School in Morton, October 2010

- Location within Philadelphia
- Country: United States
- State: Pennsylvania
- County: Philadelphia
- City: Philadelphia
- Area codes: 215, 267 and 445

Morton is a neighborhood in Northwest Philadelphia, Pennsylvania, United States. It is located south of West Oak Lane, east of Mount Airy, and west of North Broad Street.

The Robert Fulton School, Mennonite Meetinghouse, and Theodore Roosevelt Junior High School are listed on the National Register of Historic Places.
