= Erie Armory =

- U.S. National Register of Historic Places
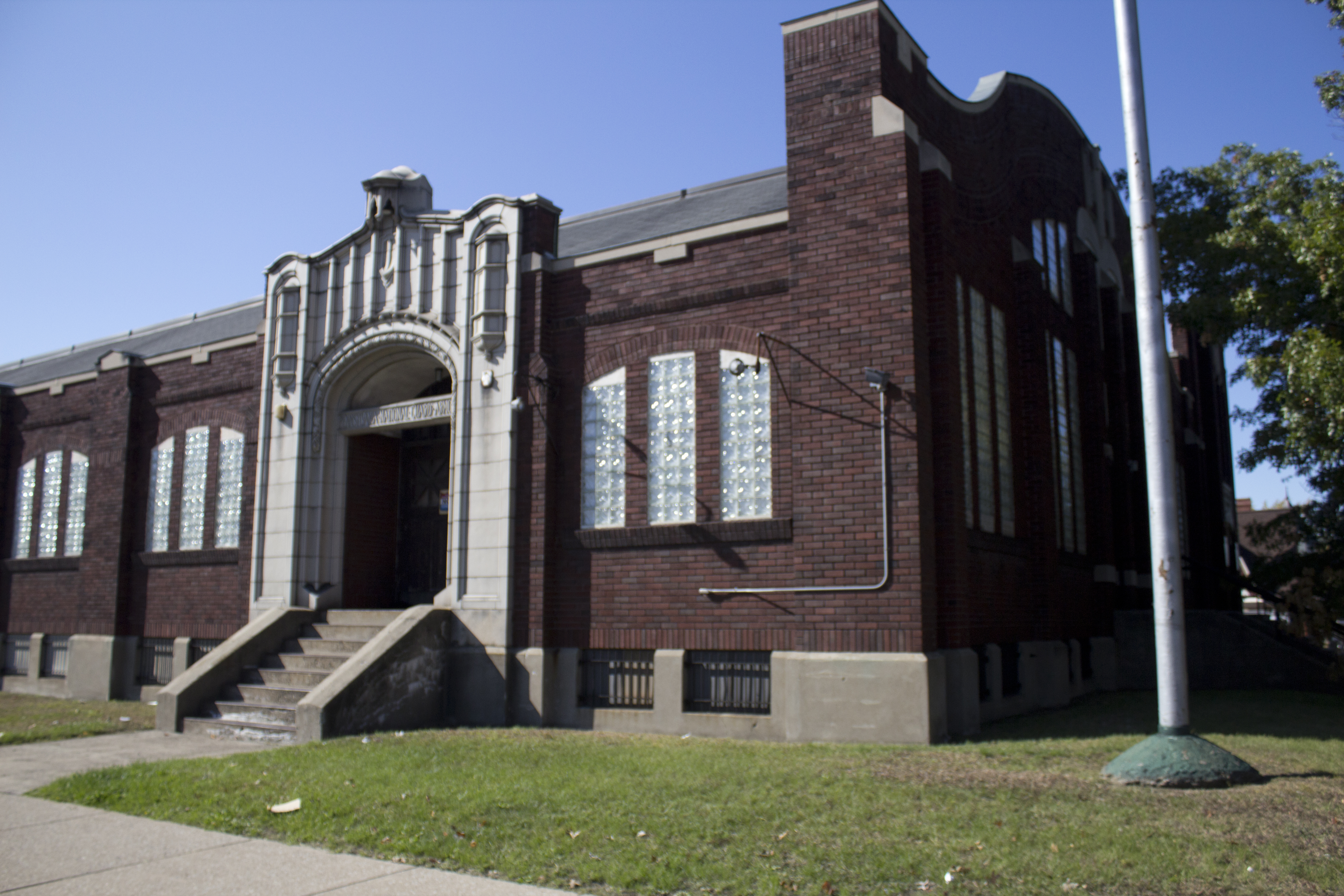
- Erie Armory, September 2012

- Location within Pennsylvania Location within the United States
- Location: 6th and Parade Sts., Erie, Pennsylvania
- Coordinates: 42°7′57″N 80°4′40″W
- Area: 2 acres (0.81 ha)
- Built: 1920, 1929
- Architect: Kuntz, Joseph F.
- Architectural style: Colonial Revival, Art Deco
- MPS: Pennsylvania National Guard Armories MPS
- NRHP reference No.: 89002073
- Added to NRHP: December 22, 1989

Erie Armory is a historic National Guard armory located at Erie, Erie County, Pennsylvania. The original section was built in 1920, and the size doubled with an expansion in 1929. The rectangular building consists of an administration building with attached drill hall in the Colonial Revival style. The building is constructed of brick and features a crenelated parapet. The administration building has a flat roof and drill hall a gable roof. It was designed by noted armory architect Joseph F. Kuntz.

It was added to the National Register of Historic Places in 1989.
