= Altoona Armory =

- U.S. National Register of Historic Places
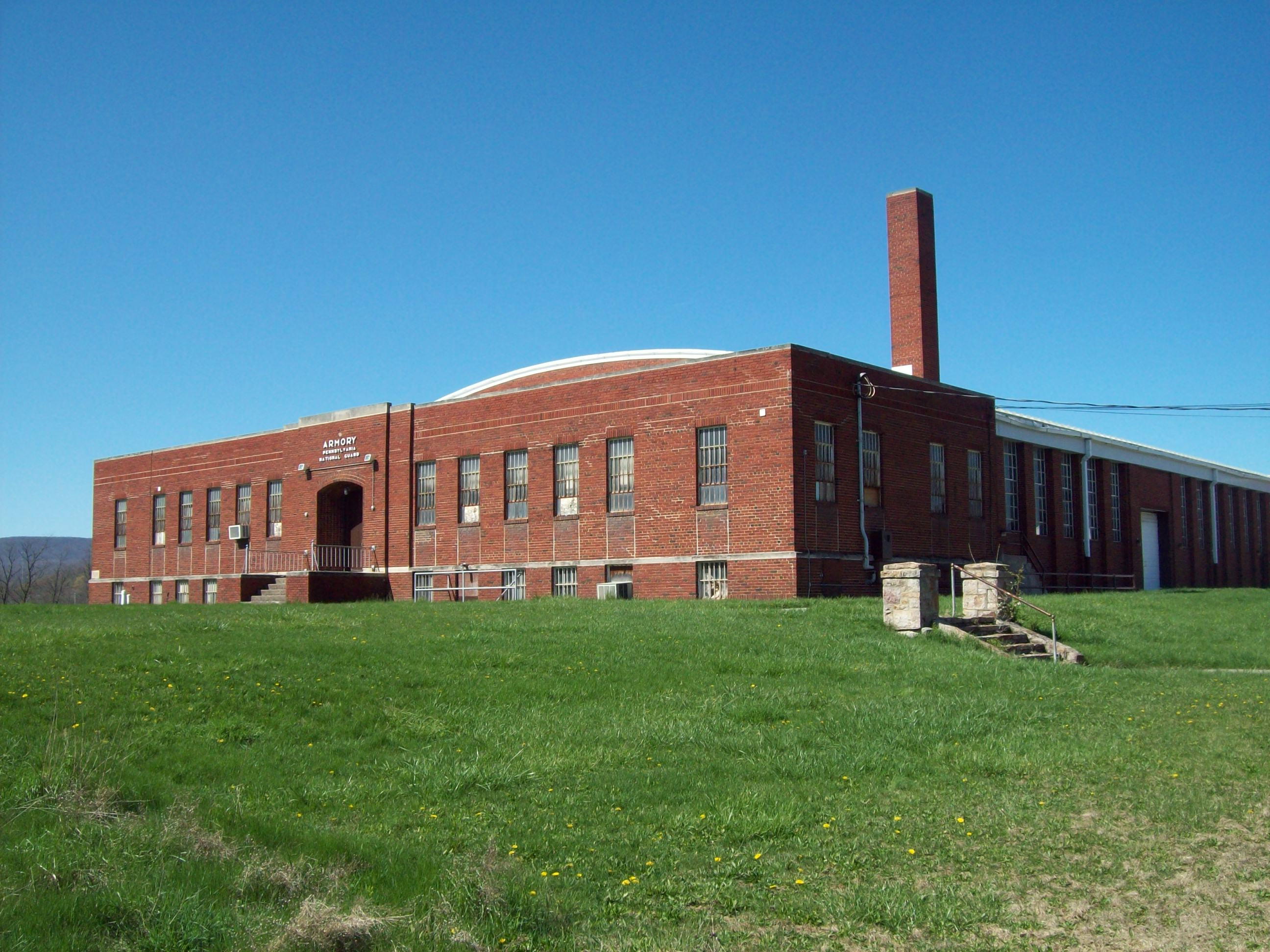
- Altoona Armory, April 2012

- Location within Pennsylvania Location within the United States
- Location: 327 Frankstown Road, Logan Township, Pennsylvania
- Coordinates: 40°28′53″N 78°23′50″W
- Area: 10 acres (4.0 ha)
- Built: 1938
- Architect: Hersh, Frank Austin
- Architectural style: Moderne
- MPS: Pennsylvania National Guard Armories MPS
- NRHP reference No.: 91000507
- Added to NRHP: May 9, 1991

Altoona Armory was a historic National Guard armory located at Logan Township, Blair County, Pennsylvania. The main armory building was built in 1938, and was an "I"-plan building in the Moderne style. The front section housed administrative functions and the rear was the former two-story stable area for the cavalry unit. Between these sections was the riding hall, which had a round arched roof. It was one of nine armories built in Pennsylvania between 1912 and 1938.

It was added to the National Register of Historic Places in 1991. It has since been demolished.
