= Jacob Mixsell House =

Historic house in Pennsylvania, United States

- U.S. National Register of Historic Places
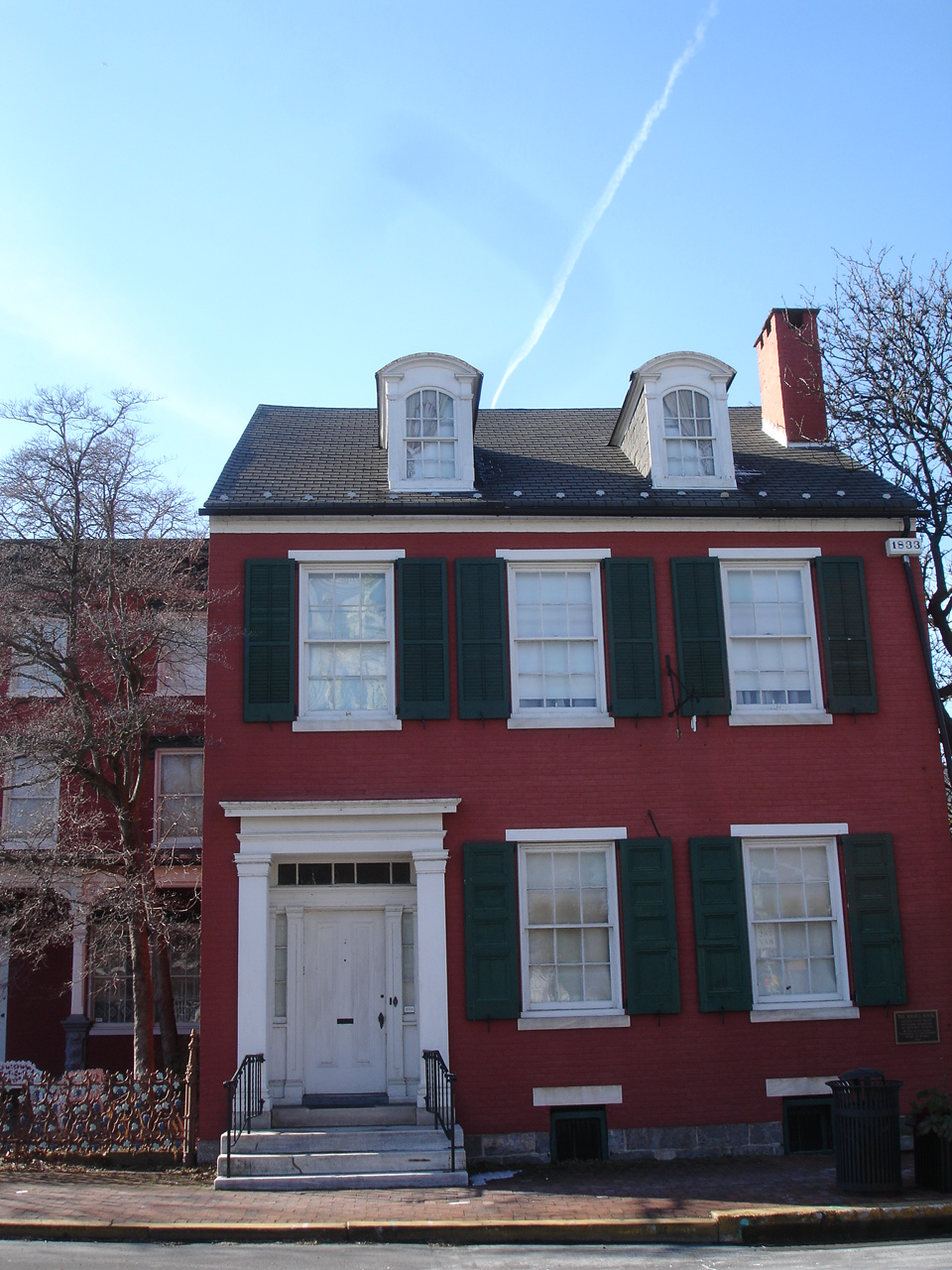
- The Jacob Mixsell House in January, 2013

- Location within Pennsylvania Location within the United States
- Location: 101 S. 4th St., Easton, Pennsylvania
- Coordinates: 40°40′50″N 75°12′37″W
- Area: 0.1 acres (0.040 ha)
- Built: 1833
- Built by: Jacob Mixsell
- Architectural style: Late Federal
- NRHP reference No.: 80003584
- Added to NRHP: February 14, 1980

The Jacob Mixsell House, also known as the Northampton County Historical and Genealogical Society, is an historic home that is located in Easton, Northampton County, Pennsylvania, United States.

It was added to the National Register of Historic Places in 1980.

== History and architectural features ==
Built in 1833, this historic structure is a 2 1/2-story brick building that was designed in the Late Federal style. A rear addition was built about 1850. The interior features five fireplaces with marble mantles believed to be from King of Prussia, Pennsylvania, United States. It has housed the Northampton County Historical and Genealogical Society since 1927.
