= Waynesboro Armory =

- U.S. National Register of Historic Places
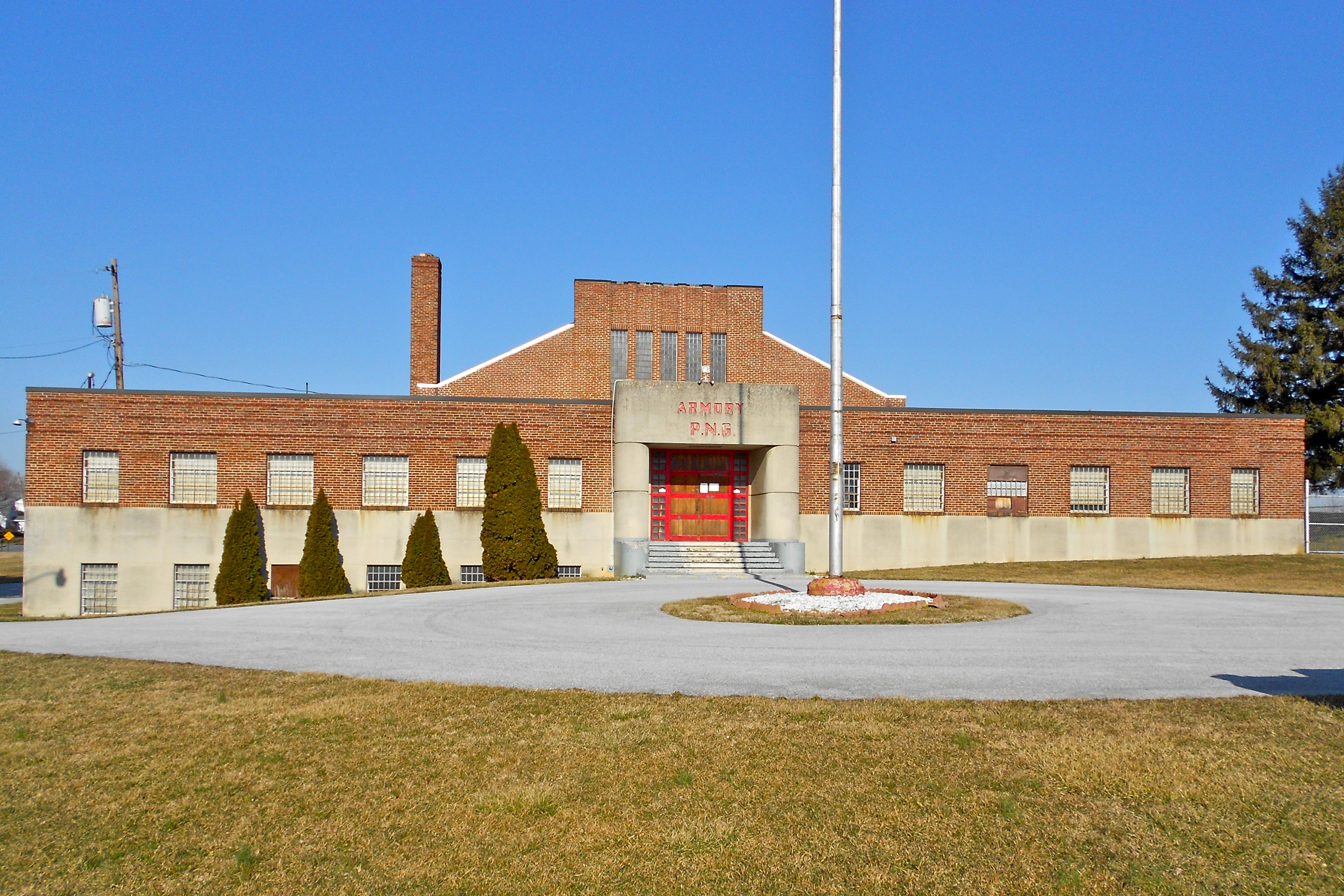
- Waynesboro Armory, February 2012

- Location within Pennsylvania Location within the United States
- Location: 410 N. Grant St. Waynesboro, Pennsylvania
- Coordinates: 39°45′56″N 77°34′45″W
- Area: 12 acres (4.9 ha)
- Built: 1938
- Architect: Silverman & Levy
- Architectural style: Moderne
- MPS: Pennsylvania National Guard Armories MPS
- NRHP reference No.: 89002080
- Added to NRHP: December 22, 1989

Waynesboro Armory is a historic National Guard armory located at Waynesboro, Franklin County, Pennsylvania. It was built in 1938, and is a one-story, "I"-plan brick building in the Moderne style. It consists of three sections: administration building, drill hall, and stable. Its construction was funded in part by the Public Works Administration.

It was added to the National Register of Historic Places in 1989.
