= Robert Fulton School =

- U.S. National Register of Historic Places
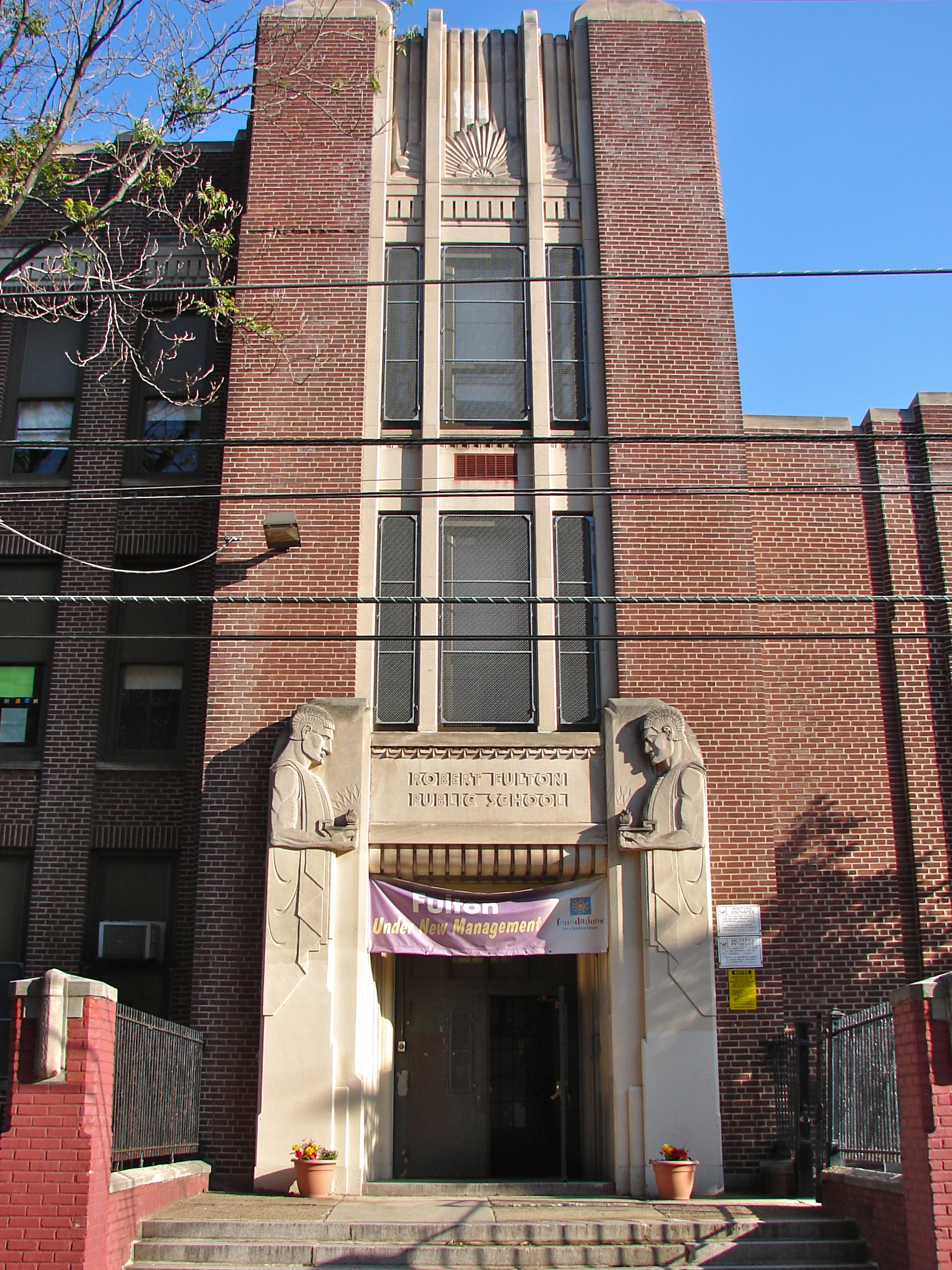
- Robert Fulton School, October 2010

- Location within Philadelphia Location within Pennsylvania Location within the United States
- Location: 60–68 E. Haines St., Philadelphia, Pennsylvania
- Coordinates: 40.0396°N 75.1753°W
- Area: 1 acre (0.40 ha)
- Built: 1935–1937
- Architect: Irwin T. Catharine
- Architectural style: Moderne
- MPS: Philadelphia Public Schools TR
- NRHP reference No.: 86003284
- Added to NRHP: December 4, 1986

Robert Fulton School is a historic school building located in the Morton neighborhood of Philadelphia, Pennsylvania.

The building was added to the National Register of Historic Places in 1986.

== History and architectural features ==
Designed by Irwin T. Catharine, this historic structure was built between 1935 and 1937. It is a three-story, brick and limestone building that was created in the Moderne style. It features ribbon bands of windows, large brick piers, a main entrance tower, and historical figures holding lamps of enlightenment and knowledge. It was named for inventor Robert Fulton.

The building was added to the National Register of Historic Places in 1986. The school was closed in 2013.
