= Herman Simon House =

Historic house in Pennsylvania, United States

- U.S. National Register of Historic Places
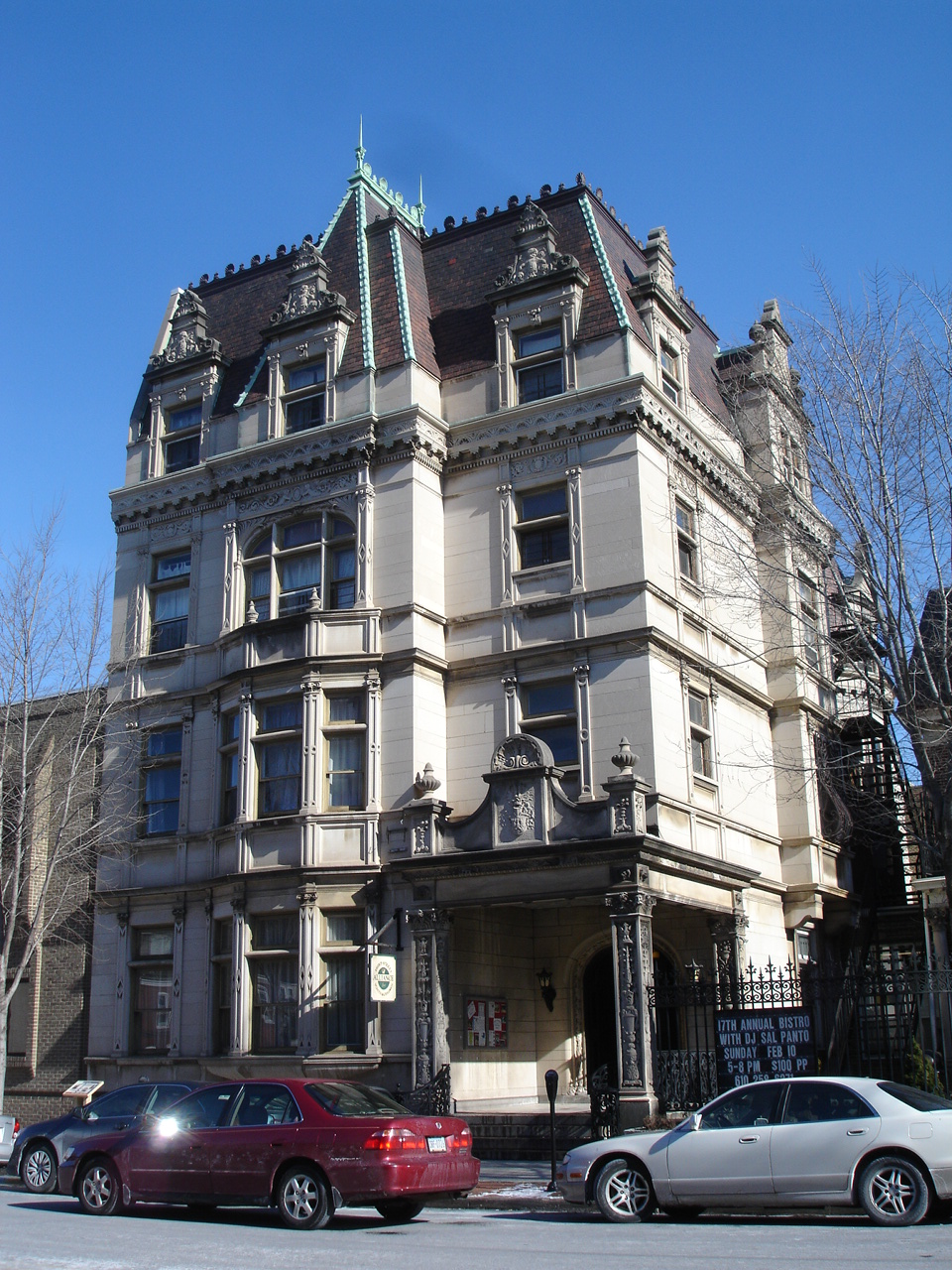
- The Herman Simon House in January, 2013.

- Location within Pennsylvania Location within the United States
- Location: 41 N. 3rd St., Easton, Pennsylvania
- Coordinates: 40°41′33″N 75°12′32″W
- Area: 0.5 acres (0.20 ha)
- Built: 1902
- Architect: William Morris Michler
- Architectural style: Renasissance, French Chateau
- NRHP reference No.: 80003586
- Added to NRHP: June 27, 1980

The Herman Simon House is a historic home located in Easton, Northampton County, Pennsylvania. It was built in 1902 for Herman Simon, an immigrant from Germany who became a wealthy silk manufacturer.

It was added to the National Register of Historic Places in 1980.

== History ==
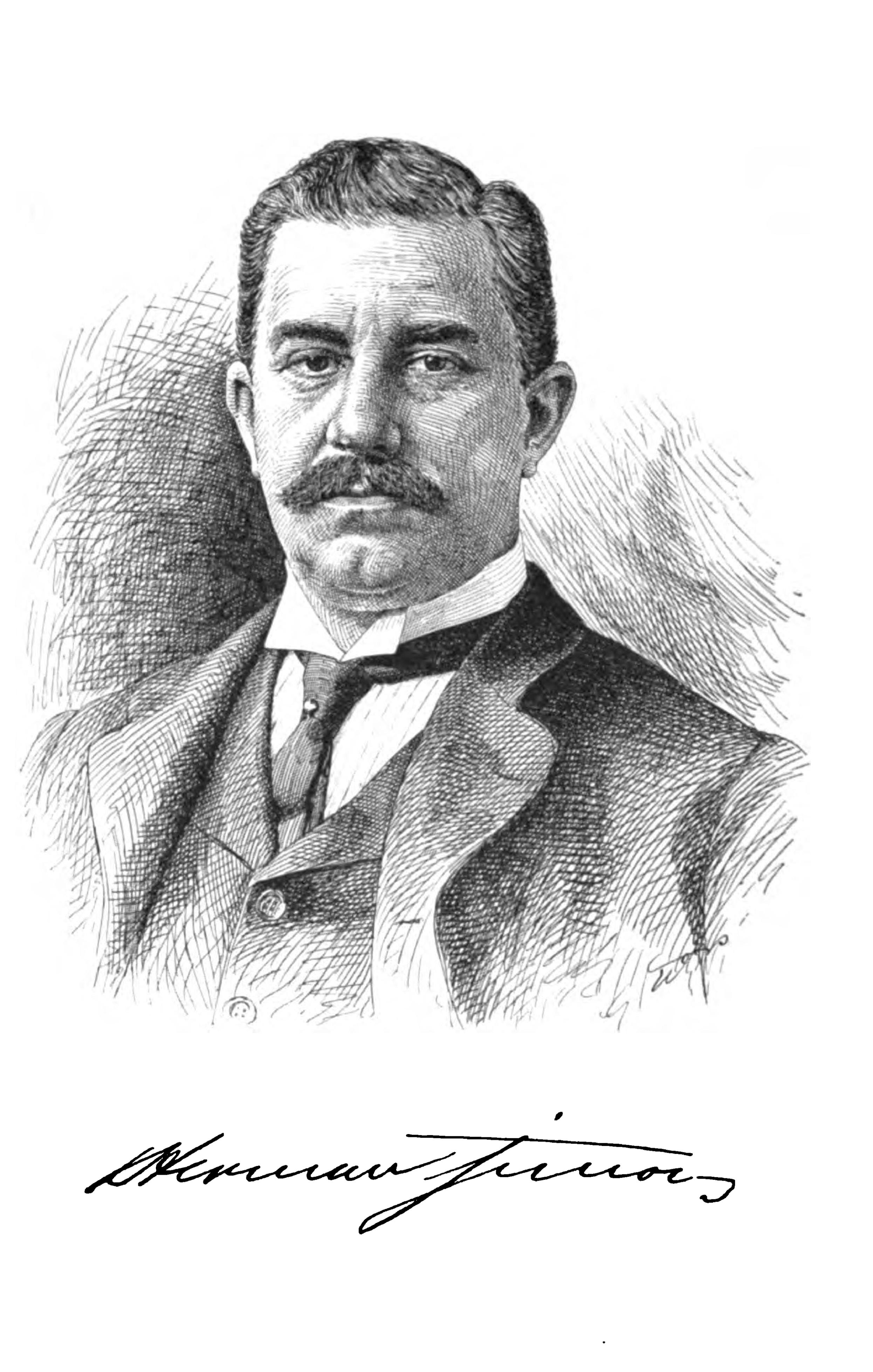
Herman Simon

Built in 1902 for the wealthy silk manufacturer, Herman Simon, an immigrant from Germany, the Herman Simon House is an Indiana limestone dwelling on a granite base in the French Chateau style. The rectangular building measures 24 feet wide and 120 feet deep, and features a four-story, semi-circular bay tower and a projecting porch. It was added to the National Register of Historic Places in 1980.

The home's owner, Herman Simon, died in 1913.

Beginning in 1930, the building became the home of the Easton YWCA.

In the 1980s, the Easton YWCA separated from the national organization and transitioned into the Third Street Alliance for Women and Children. That organization is still using the building as of the end of 2024.
