= Easton House =

- U.S. National Register of Historic Places
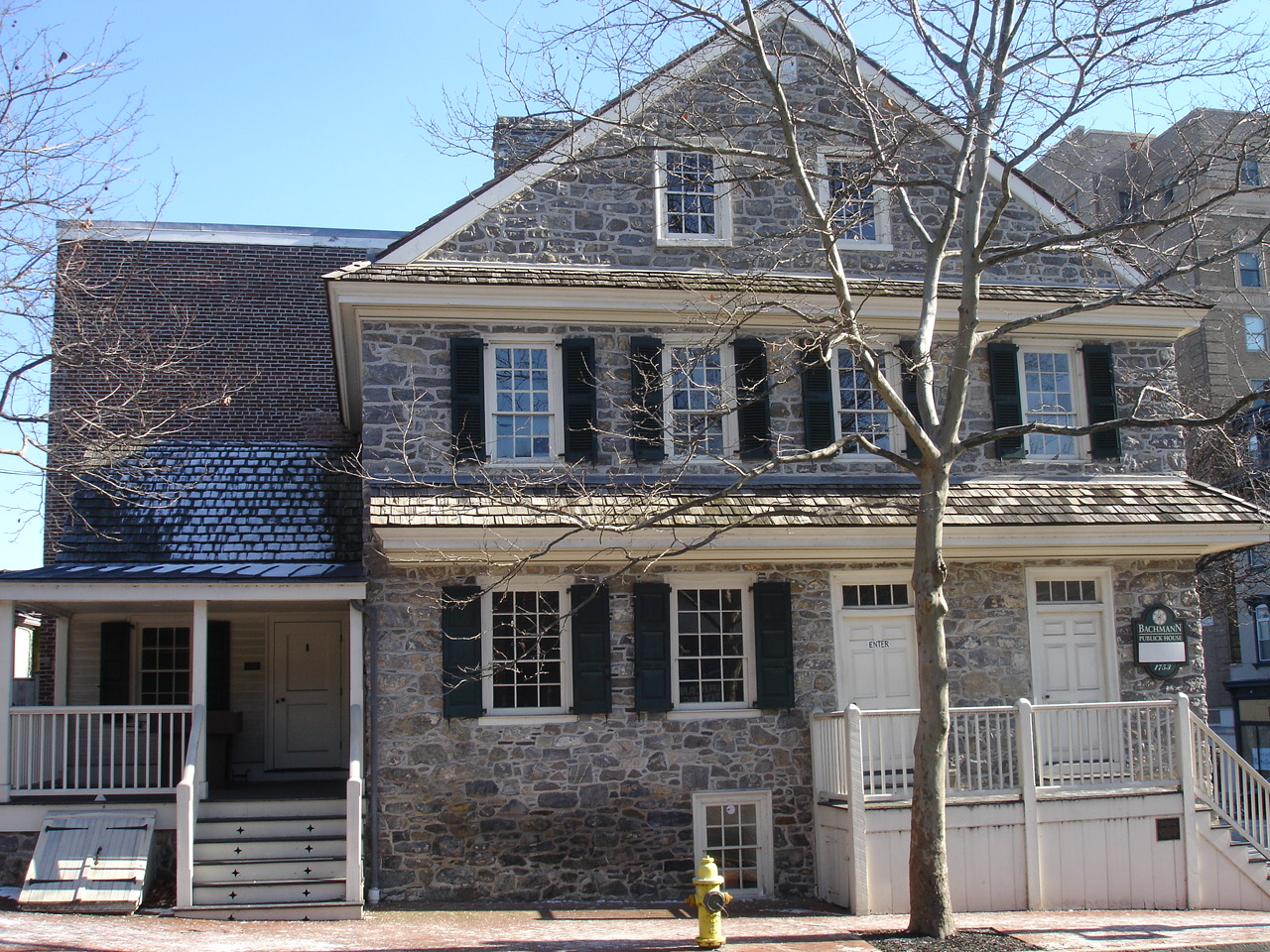
- The Easton House in January, 2013

- Location within Pennsylvania Location within the United States
- Location: 167–169 Northampton St., Easton, Pennsylvania
- Coordinates: 40°41′29″N 75°12′29″W
- Area: 0.1 acres (0.040 ha)
- Built: 1754, 1765, 1828
- Architect: William Parsons
- Architectural style: Delaware Valley Georgian
- NRHP reference No.: 80003583
- Added to NRHP: December 3, 1980

Easton House, also known as the Bachmann Publick House and George Taylor's Easton Property, is a historic inn and tavern located at Easton in Northampton County, Pennsylvania. It was built in 1753, and is a 2 3/4 story rubble limestone building, with squared corners, in the Georgian style.

Easton House was expanded by George Taylor (c. 1716–1781) in 1765, who used it as a residence and tavern. A red clay brick addition was built in 1828. The building was the site of a number of important judicial proceedings when it housed the Magistrates Court in the early 19th century.

It was added to the National Register of Historic Places in 1980.It is currently maintained by the Northampton County Historical & Genealogical Society (NCHGS), with its headquarters in the Sigal Museum.
