= Moravian University =

Private college in Bethlehem, Pennsylvania, US

Coordinates: 40°37.81′N 75°22.90′W

- Former name: List: Men's college: Nazareth Hall (1759-1929); Moravian College and Theological Seminary (1807–1954); Women's college: Bethlehem Female Seminary (Founded 1742); Moravian Female Seminary (1863–1913); Moravian Seminary and College for Women (1913–1954); Merged college: Moravian College (1954–2021)
- Motto: Via Lucis
- Motto in English: The Way of Light
- Type: Private university
- Established: 1742; 284 years ago (Girls' School); 1807; 219 years ago (College); 1863; 163 years ago
- Religious affiliation: Moravian Church
- Academic affiliations: LVAIC
- Endowment: $177 million (2024)
- President: Bryon Grigsby
- Administrative staff: 297
- Undergraduates: 2,075
- Postgraduates: 302
- Location: Bethlehem, Pennsylvania, U.S.
- Campus: 100 acres (40 ha); Suburban and Urban
- Colors: Blue and Grey
- Nickname: Greyhounds
- Website: moravian.edu

UNESCO World Heritage Site
- Criteria: iii, iv
- Reference: 1468
- Inscription: 2015 (39th Session)
- Extensions: 2024

Moravian University is a private university in Bethlehem, Pennsylvania, United States. The institution traces its history to girls' and boys' schools opened in 1742 by Moravians, descendants of followers of the Bohemian Reformation under John Amos Comenius.

The Bethlehem Female Seminary was founded in 1742 as a girls' school, and renamed as the Moravian Seminary and College for Women in 1913. Moravian boys' schools were founded in 1742 and 1743 and merged in 1759 to form Nazareth Hall in Nazareth, Pennsylvania. The boys' school established a Moravian College and Theological Seminary in 1807, which moved to Bethlehem in 1858. The two colleges were accredited to award undergraduate degrees in 1863 and combined in 1954 to form Moravian College. In 2021, the college was elevated to a university. Based on the foundation of the girls' school in 1742, before the university was accredited, or granted any sort of degree, and was instead more akin to a primary school, the university claims to be the sixth-oldest college in the United States.

Moravian Church Settlements — Bethlehem was inscribed as a UNESCO World Heritage Site in July 2024. This designation includes two Moravian University buildings: the Second Single Brethren's House and the Widows' House, both situated on the campus' south side along Church Street. The Second Single Brethren's House now serves as a hub for musical education and celebration while the Widow's House provides residential facilities for the school's faculty and staff.

== History ==
Moravian University claims to be the sixth-oldest college in the United States and the first to educate women in the original 13 colonies. Despite only becoming an accredited collegiate institution in 1913, the university traces its roots to the Bethlehem Female Seminary, an academy more akin to a modern high school, which was founded in 1742, as the second boarding school for young women in the U.S. behind just the Ursuline Academy in New Orleans. The seminary was created by Benigna, Countess von Zinzendorf, the daughter of Count Nikolaus Ludwig Zinzendorf, who was the benefactor of the fledgling Moravian communities in Nazareth and Bethlehem, Pennsylvania. The "Moravian Female Seminary" was incorporated by the Pennsylvania State Legislature in 1863 and became the women's college, the "Moravian Seminary and College for Women" in 1913.

The university also traces its roots to the founding of two boys' schools, established in 1742 and 1743, which merged to become Nazareth Hall in 1759. Located in the town of Nazareth, Nazareth Hall became, in part, "Moravian College and Theological Seminary" in 1807. It was later incorporated by the Pennsylvania State Legislature in 1863 as a baccalaureate-granting institution, albeit with the same name. Beginning in 1858 and continuing to 1892, the seminary and college relocated from Nazareth to a former boys' school on Church Street in Bethlehem, located on the present site of the Bethlehem City Hall.

The men's Moravian College and Theological Seminary then settled in the north end of the city (the present-day North Campus) as a result of a donation from the Bethlehem Congregation of the Moravian Church in 1888. The first buildings constructed at North Campus, Comenius Hall and Zinzendorf Hall, were completed in 1892 and joined the property's original brick farmhouse to form the new campus. The farmhouse was later named Hamilton Hall, which still stands today.

In 1954, the two schools combined to form the single, coeducational, modern institution of "Moravian College". The merger of the two institutions combined the North Campus (the location of the men's college from 1892 to 1954) and the South Campus (the location of the women's college) into a single collegiate campus. The distance between the North and South campuses is about 0.8 miles (1.3 km) of Main Street, called the "Moravian Mile". First-year students traditionally walk the Moravian Mile as part of their orientation activities.

In 2021, Moravian College received approval from the Pennsylvania Department of Education to become a university. The change to "Moravian University" became official on July 1, 2021.

== Academics ==
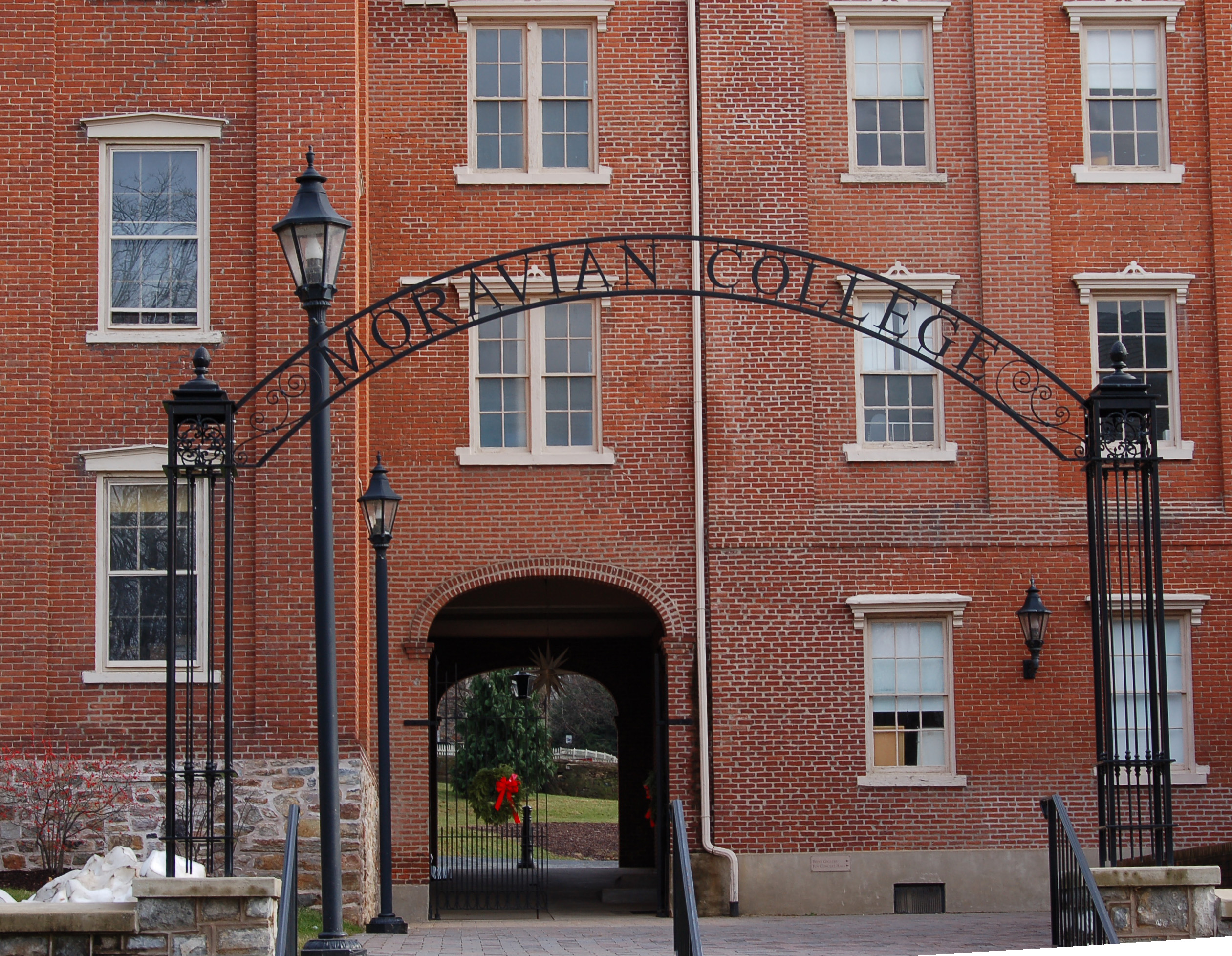
Gate of the South Campus from Main Street

Moravian University enrolls about 1,700 full-time undergraduate students and more than 500 graduate students. The seminary enrolls over 100 part-time students in its graduate divinity programs. During most semesters, at least 14 denominations are represented in the seminary student body. Faith communities most often represented among the seminary's students include: Moravian, Lutheran, UCC, Episcopal, United Methodist, Presbyterian, Baptist, Roman Catholic, Quaker, Mennonite, Unitarian Universalist, African Methodist Episcopal, Assembly of God, Brethren, Reformed, and nondenominational. The university's varied and highly regarded music programs grow from the Moravian Church's musical traditions.

Moravian University's student news site is The Comenian, which is published online throughout the school year.

Every year, the student body elects representatives to the United Student Government. USG has a legislature, composed of 16 senators from the undergraduate body, an executive, including an elected president and vice president, appointed cabinet and staff, and a judiciary, composed of appointed justices. USG was officially recognized in 1968. Additionally, two students are elected members of Moravian University's board of trustees; both are full, voting members and serve two-year terms.

Moravian University awards these undergraduate and graduate degrees: Bachelor of Music, Bachelor of Arts, Bachelor of Fine Arts, Bachelor of Science in nursing, Bachelor of Science, Master of Arts, Master of Business Administration, Master of Data Analytics, Master of Education, Master of Fine Arts, Master of Health Administration, Master of Human Resource Management, Doctor of Physical Therapy, and Doctor of Athletic Training. The seminary grants Master of Divinity, Master of Arts in Chaplaincy, and Master of Arts in Theological Studies degrees. The university also has evening undergraduate programs for adults seeking continuing undergraduate education and graduate degrees. The seminary has accreditation from the Association of Theological Schools in the United States and Canada.

Because Bethlehem, Pennsylvania, and Tondabayashi, Japan, have been sister cities for over half a century, Moravian University and Osaka Ohtani University (大阪大谷大学) also established a partnership. Each spring, several Japanese students come to Moravian for two weeks to take a class about the American education system. These students are hosted by Moravian students and enjoy trips to New York City and Philadelphia. During May and June 2010, the first two Moravian students studied at Osaka Ohtani University. Additionally, the university is a member of the Lehigh Valley Association of Independent Colleges & Universities with Muhlenberg College, Lafayette College, Lehigh University, Cedar Crest College, and DeSales University; students from each institution can take classes in each other member institution and can take courses in programs offered at other institutions not offered at Moravian.

The university's Student Opportunities for Academic Research (SOAR) program provides stipends, travel allowances, and expenses for students engaged in research or creative activities through close interaction with a faculty mentor. The program helps Moravian students gain a better understanding of scholarship in their discipline, and fosters scholar–colleague relationships. SOAR stipends can be as high as $3,000 for summer work.

Established in 1960, the university's honors program provides qualified seniors the opportunity to pursue a yearlong intensive study of a subject of special interest.

== Campus ==
The university's programs are offered at four locations: Main Street Campus (North Campus), the Priscilla Payne Hurd Campus (South Campus), the Steel Field Complex, and the Sports Medicine and Rehabilitation Center.

=== Priscilla Payne Hurd Campus ===
Art and music programs are offered in Bethlehem's historic district on the college's Priscilla Payne Hurd Campus. Many of the buildings on that campus were built during the colonial period, including the Brethren's House, built in 1748, which served as a hospital during the Revolutionary War, and currently houses the Music Department. Also located on Priscilla Payne Campus are the President's House, Main Hall (1854), the Widow's House, Clewell Hall, West Hall, South Hall, the 1867 Chapel, Clewell Dining Hall, and the Central Moravian Church. A number of the buildings are connected. The facilities have been renovated to include Payne Gallery (renovated from the original women's gymnasium in 1903), the college's two-level art gallery that offers several shows each year, and Foy Concert Hall. Also located on the Priscilla Payne Hurd Campus are Peter Hall, a medium-sized recital hall, Hearst Hall, a small recital hall, and individual student rehearsal rooms and art studios. The university presents the nationally renowned Christmas Vespers services in the Central Moravian Church, located on the corner of Main and Church streets across from Brethren's House. Many of the buildings on the Priscilla Payne Hurd Campus are located in a National Register of Historic Places District and Church Street has been referred to as one of the most historic streets in America.

In the 2009–2010 school year, Moravian University added a new living complex on the Priscilla Payne Hurd Campus called the HILL. Each floor has suites, where four to 16 people can live. The complex has classrooms, a cafe, a fitness room, a mail room, and common rooms. The HILL is air conditioned and fully handicap accessible. The suites contain a living room, full kitchen, private bathroom, and additional hallway sinks. A shuttle service is provided for easy transportation between the North and South campuses.

=== Main Street Campus ===
Initially given in 1888 and settled in 1892, the North Campus is also known as the Main Street campus, as it is physically larger and is the site of the majority of the university's buildings, academic departments, administration, and student residences. The main building of the Main Street Campus is Comenius Hall, which was built in 1892 and is named for John Amos Comenius, the last bishop of Unity of the Brethren, known as the "father of modern education" for his revolutionary educational principles. Comenius wrote in 1632, "not the children of the rich or of the powerful only, but of all alike, boys and girls, both noble and ignoble, rich and poor, in all cities and towns, villages and hamlets, should be sent to school". The Moravians had considered schools secondary in importance only to churches. A statue of Comenius, which was a gift to the college from Charles University of Prague and the Moravian Church of Czechoslovakia, stands in front of Comenius Hall. The Main Street Campus is also the location of Reeves Library, Priscilla Payne Hurd Academic Complex, Colonial Hall, the Bahnson Center, the Moravian Archives, Zinzendorf Hall, Borhek Chapel, Prosser Auditorium (capacity 300, inside the Haupert Union Building), Monocacy Hall, Collier Hall of Science, the Sally Miksiewiecz Center for Health Sciences, Hamilton Hall, Memorial Hall, Benigna Hall, Johnston Hall (capacity 1,600 for athletics, 3,000 for events), the Timothy M. Breidegam Athletic and Recreation Center, the Collier Hall of Science, the Haupert Union Building, the Arena Theatre, and most of the university's student housing, including dorms, townhouses, and apartments.

In 2016, John Makuvek Field was installed and opened behind the Haupert Union Building. John Makuvek Field is a synthetic-turf field that is home to the Greyhounds' field hockey, men's and women's lacrosse, and men's and women's soccer teams. The field is named for John Makuvek, who retired in 1996 after four years as athletics director, and in 2010 after 43 years as head golf coach. The field is located at the center of campus, with views from the residential halls, Reeves Library, and the portico of the Haupert Union Building (HUB), which has been razed and will re-open in August 2025 as a $42 million state-of-the-art student center with student mental and physical wellness central to the building design.

In 2017, the Sally Breidegam Miksiewicz Center for Health Sciences was opened at 1107 Main Street. The 55,000-square-foot facility hosts classes for both undergraduate and graduate programs, including nursing, informatics, and the health sciences and features the region's only virtual cadaver lab. The building is named in honor of former Moravian College trustee Sally Breidegam Miksiewicz.

Also located on the Main Street Campus is the Betty Prince field hockey field.

=== Steel Field Complex ===
Most of the university's athletic fields are located at this complex, including the football stadium with a grandstand capacity of 2,400 and Sportexe turf field, eight-lane Mondo Super X Performance synthetic track, the softball field, the Gillespie baseball field, the Hoffman tennis courts, the football practice fields, and a fieldhouse.

Steel Field and its brick grandstand were originally built by Bethlehem Steel to host the Bethlehem Steel Football Club, 1913 to 1930. In 1925, Lehigh University purchased Steel Field from Bethlehem Steel. The Bethlehem Steel Soccer Club continued to use the field until its demise. In 1962, Lehigh sold the facility to Moravian University.

== Athletics ==
Moravian's athletics teams are nicknamed the Greyhounds. The university is a member of the NCAA and competes in Division III sports. Moravian University is a founding member of the Landmark Conference; members include Elizabethtown College, Susquehanna University, Catholic University, Drew University, Goucher College, Juniata College, and the University of Scranton.

Men's sports include football, lacrosse, soccer, basketball, baseball, track and field, cross country, tennis, golf, and swimming. Women's sports include softball, basketball, soccer, field hockey, track and field, volleyball, tennis, lacrosse, golf, cross country, and swimming.

== A UNESCO World Heritage Site ==
On July 26, 2024, Moravian Church Settlements—Bethlehem became the 26th UNESCO World Heritage site in the United States. Along with Gracehill, Northern Ireland, and Herrnhut, Germany, Bethlehem joins Christiansfeld, Denmark as a single World Heritage site that represents the outstanding universal value of these historic settlements and the worldwide influence of the Moravian Church.

Bethlehem's historic sites include the Colonial Industrial Quarter, Central Moravian Church's places of worship, the city of Bethlehem, and Moravian University.

The Second Single Brethren's House, built in 1748 at the end of West Church Street on the axis of Main Street, is the most impressive example of 18th-century Moravian Church Civic Baroque in the US (today it is part of Moravian University).

The district also includes two buildings — the Waterworks pump house and the Gemeinhaus (community hall) — both previously recognized as historic landmarks on their own.

== Notable people ==
=== Alumni ===
- J. Neil Alexander, Bishop of the Episcopal Diocese of Atlanta
- John Andretti, former NASCAR, IndyCar, and NHRA professional race car driver
- William F. Badè, former president of the Sierra Club, 1918–22
- James Montgomery Beck, class of 1880 and trustee; Solicitor General of the United States (1921–1925), member of United States House of Representatives (1927–1934), and constitutional law scholar
- John B. Callahan, mayor of Bethlehem, Pennsylvania, 2004–14
- Rev. Edmund Alexander de Schweinitz, class of 1834, Bishop of the Moravian Church; author and founder of The Moravian, the weekly journal of the Moravian Church
- Robert L. Freeman, member of the Pennsylvania House of Representatives from the 136th district
- John Gorka, contemporary folk musician
- Louis Greenwald, New Jersey State Assemblyman
- William Jacob Holland, zoologist and paleontologist; University of Pittsburgh chancellor, 1891–1901; former director of the Carnegie Museums of Pittsburgh
- George Hrab, class of 1993, musician and podcaster
- Andrew A. Humphreys, class of 1822, brigadier general in the U.S. Army; Union general in the Civil War; division commander, Army of the Potomac; chief engineer of the U.S. Army; one of the principal incorporators of the National Academy of Sciences; author of scientific and historical works
- William D. Hutchinson, justice, Pennsylvania Supreme Court, 1982–87; judge, United States Court of Appeals for the Third Circuit, 1987–95
- Janine Jagger, Class of 1972, professor of medicine, MacArthur Fellow
- Herman S. Hoffman, Moravian Church minister and Reformed Episcopalian bishop
- Florence Foster Jenkins, class of 1881, American socialite and amateur operatic soprano
- Bobby Levine, American jazz saxophonist
- John Baillie McIntosh, class of 1837, major general in the U.S. Army; Union officer in the Civil War; commander in the Battle of Gettysburg; superintendent of Indian affairs for California, 1869–70
- Paul Marcincin, former two time mayor of Bethlehem, Pennsylvania from 1978 to 1988 and from 1997 to 1998; creator of Musikfest
- Sandra Novack, author
- J. William Reynolds incumbent Mayor of Bethlehem, Pennsylvania
- Richard Shindell, contemporary folk musician
- Denny Somach, businessman, author, and Grammy Award-winning radio producer
- Herbert Spaugh, U.S. bishop of the Moravian Church
- Patience Stapleton, class of 1877, Moravian Seminary; American novelist and journalist
- Edward Thebaud, class of 1816, New York industrialist and merchant; principal, Bouchard & Thebaud, 1820–26; principal, Edward Thebaud & Son, 1850–1858
- Joseph Thoder, physician, Professor of Orthopaedics and Sports Medicine at Temple University School of Medicine
- Mildred Ladner Thompson, former reporter for The Wall Street Journal and Tulsa World
- David Zinczenko, editor and publisher

=== Trustees ===
- Curtis H. Barnette, former trustee, chairman, and CEO of Bethlehem Steel
- J. William Reynolds
