= Tamar Bair =

Tamar Bair (21 April 1912 – 13 October 1998), a native of Tamaqua, Pennsylvania, was a nursing instructor and nurse in Bethlehem, Pennsylvania. An amateur historian and photographer, she documented significant events in the transformation of Bethlehem in the middle of the 20th century using Kodachrome transparencies and other photographic media. Her maternal grandfather, Robert Moyer, owned the Nile Theater (60 West Broad Street, Bethlehem) and the Globe Theater (405 Wyandotte Street at Broadway in Bethlehem's South Side). Bair enjoyed unprecedented access to the Nile Theater during its years of operation.

In 2018, Bethlehem authors Mark C. Iampietro and John Marquette published "Tamar Bair's Bethlehem: The Colonial Industrial Quarter", based on a selection from the transparency collection with current recreations of the original photos. Narrative chapters cover the economic and social revival of Bethlehem's Colonial Industrial Quarter. Bair's interest in photography, and how to begin photo analysis of readers' own photos. Scott Paul Gordon, Andrew W. Mellon Chair in the Department of English at Lehigh University, contributed the introduction.

== Professional career ==
Bair was a nursing instructor at St. Luke's Hospital Nursing School (now St. Luke's University Health Network) in Fountain Hill, Pennsylvania and a school nurse at Moravian Academy in Bethlehem.

== Cultural and social association participation ==
Bair's obituary listed memberships in Order of the Eastern Star (Calypso Chapter 163), the Bethlehem Women's Club, Antique Study Group of Bethlehem, Burnside Plantation (now a part of Historic Bethlehem Partnership. She was a member of College Hill Moravian Church in Bethlehem.

== Photographic subjects ==
As a resident of central Bethlehem, Bair regularly walked through her city's compact, historic downtown area. According to a relative, she never left her home without her camera and two spare rolls of film. While her full body of work has not yet been reviewed, cataloged, or studied, four batches of slides totaling 113 images were released to a local librarian in February 2015. The slides were digitized by a local vendor in February 2015. Cataloging began using the Dublin Core digital object standard soon after. The batches covered the period from 1966 to 1980 (CK). Many were released to Facebook's ""You know you're from Bethlehem..." group for crowdsourced cataloging and review during March and April 2015.

- Nile Theater, 60 East Broad Street at Guetter Street (exterior, interior, tile work, residential apartment) (47 transparencies)
- January 1971 flood in Bethlehem's colonial industrial district (16 transparencies)
- Bethlehem construction scenes (old and new New Street Bridge [now Philip J. Fahy Memorial Bridge, First Valley Bank tower at Broad and Guetter with excavation) (8 transparencies)
- Bethlehem colonial historical area and right-of-way of Pennsylvania Route 378 Spur Route (42 transparencies)
