= Historic Moravian Bethlehem District =

Historic district in Pennsylvania, United States

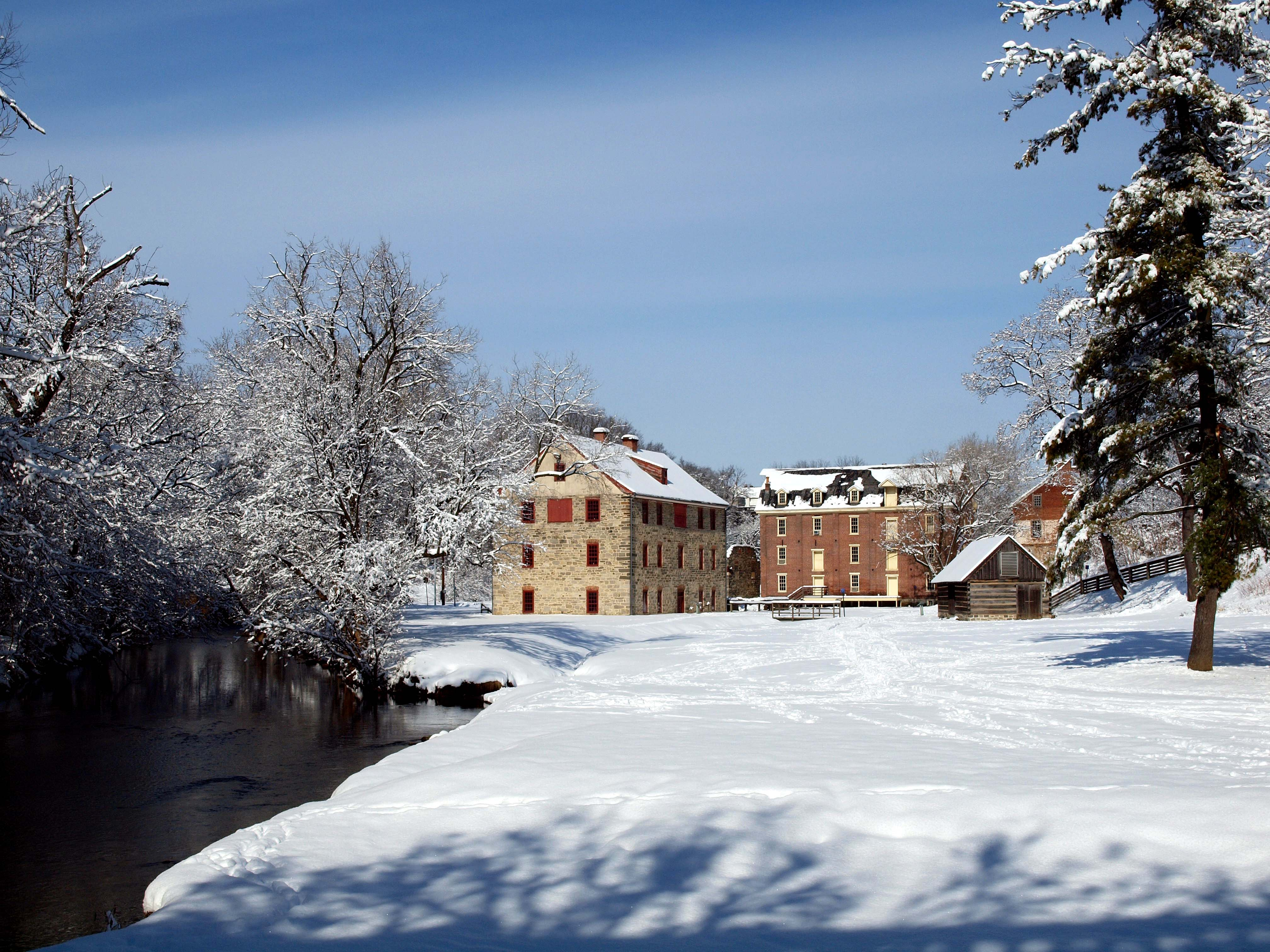
- Colonial Industrial Quarter in winter

- Location within Pennsylvania Location within the United States
- Location: Church, Market and Main Streets, Bethlehem, Pennsylvania, U.S
- Area: 14.7 acres (5.9 ha)

UNESCO World Heritage Site
- Part of: Moravian Church Settlements
- Criteria: Cultural: iii, iv
- Reference: 1468bis-003
- Inscription: 2024 (46th Session)

U.S. National Register of Historic Places
- Official name: Historic Moravian Bethlehem Historic District
- Designated: October 6, 2012
- Reference no.: 12001016

U.S. National Historic Landmark District
- Official name: Historic Moravian Bethlehem Historic District
- Designated: October 6, 2012

The Historic Moravian Bethlehem Historic District encompasses a complex of the oldest surviving buildings in Bethlehem, Pennsylvania. The National Historic Landmark District is a subset of the larger Central Bethlehem Historic District which is specifically focused on the early buildings constructed by the Moravians, who settled the city in the 18th century.

The district was added to the National Register of Historic Places and designated a National Historic Landmark in 2012 for its historical assemblage of communal religious buildings and history.

In 2016, it was named to the U.S. Tentative List for nomination to the UNESCO World Heritage List. During the 46th World Heritage Committee session in 2024, it officially became a World Heritage Site, together with other Moravian church settlements in Denmark, Germany, and the United Kingdom.

== Description and history ==
The Historic Moravian Bethlehem Historic District occupies a discontinuous 14.7-acre (5.9 ha) area of central Bethlehem. Its central core consists of the Moravian Museum of Bethlehem and adjacent properties, located at Main and West Church Streets east of Monocacy Creek, which is a tributary of the Lehigh River in Northampton County.

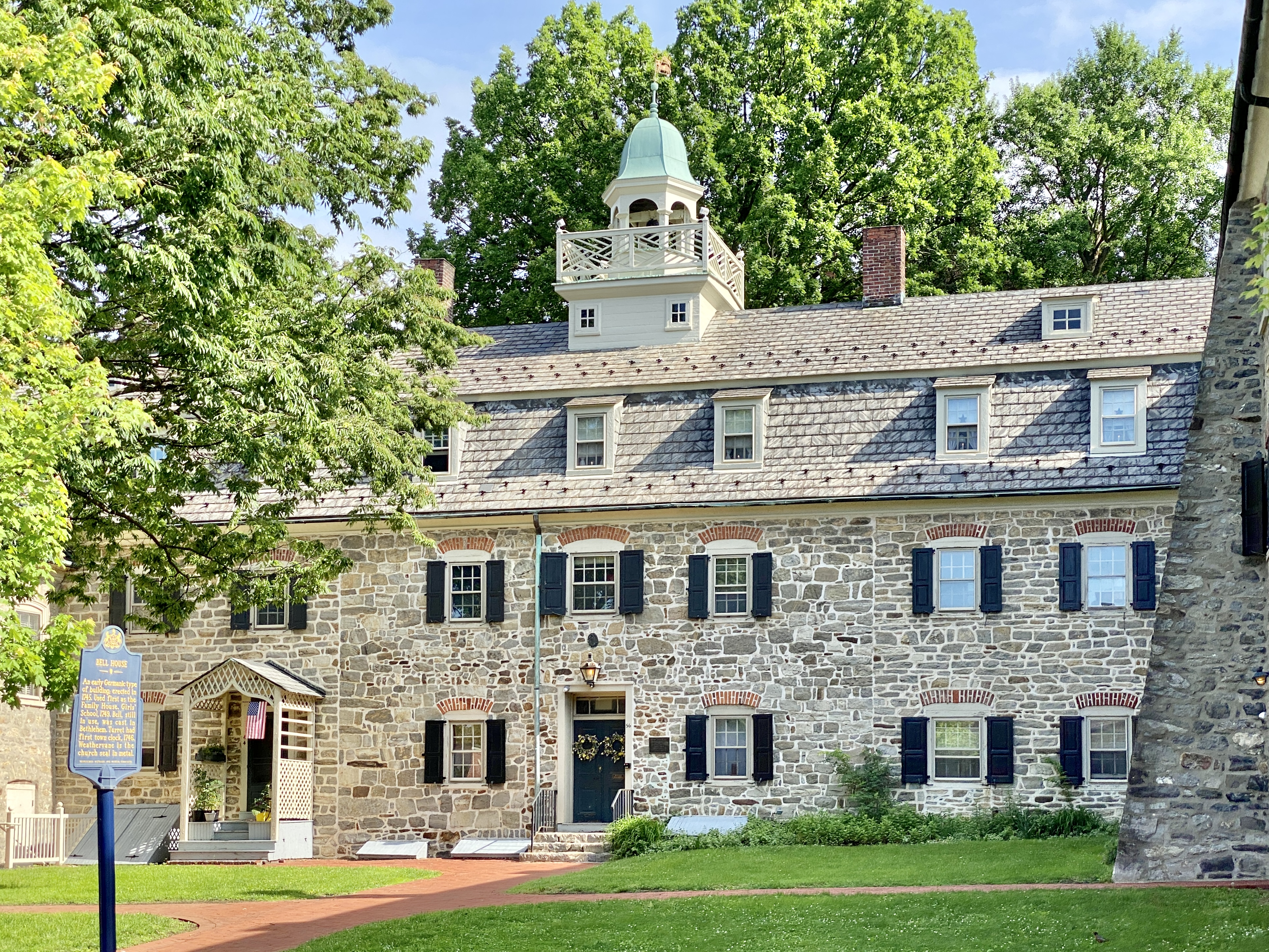
Bell House in May 2022

The museum property includes a connected series of 18th-century stone buildings which includes the 1744-1772 Single Sisters' House and the 1746 Bell House, both of which served as communal living facilities, and the 1751 Old Chapel. Also part of the complex, the Lewis David de Schweinitz Residence is a National Historic Landmark for its association with botanist and mycologist Lewis David de Schweinitz who used to take up residence in the building.

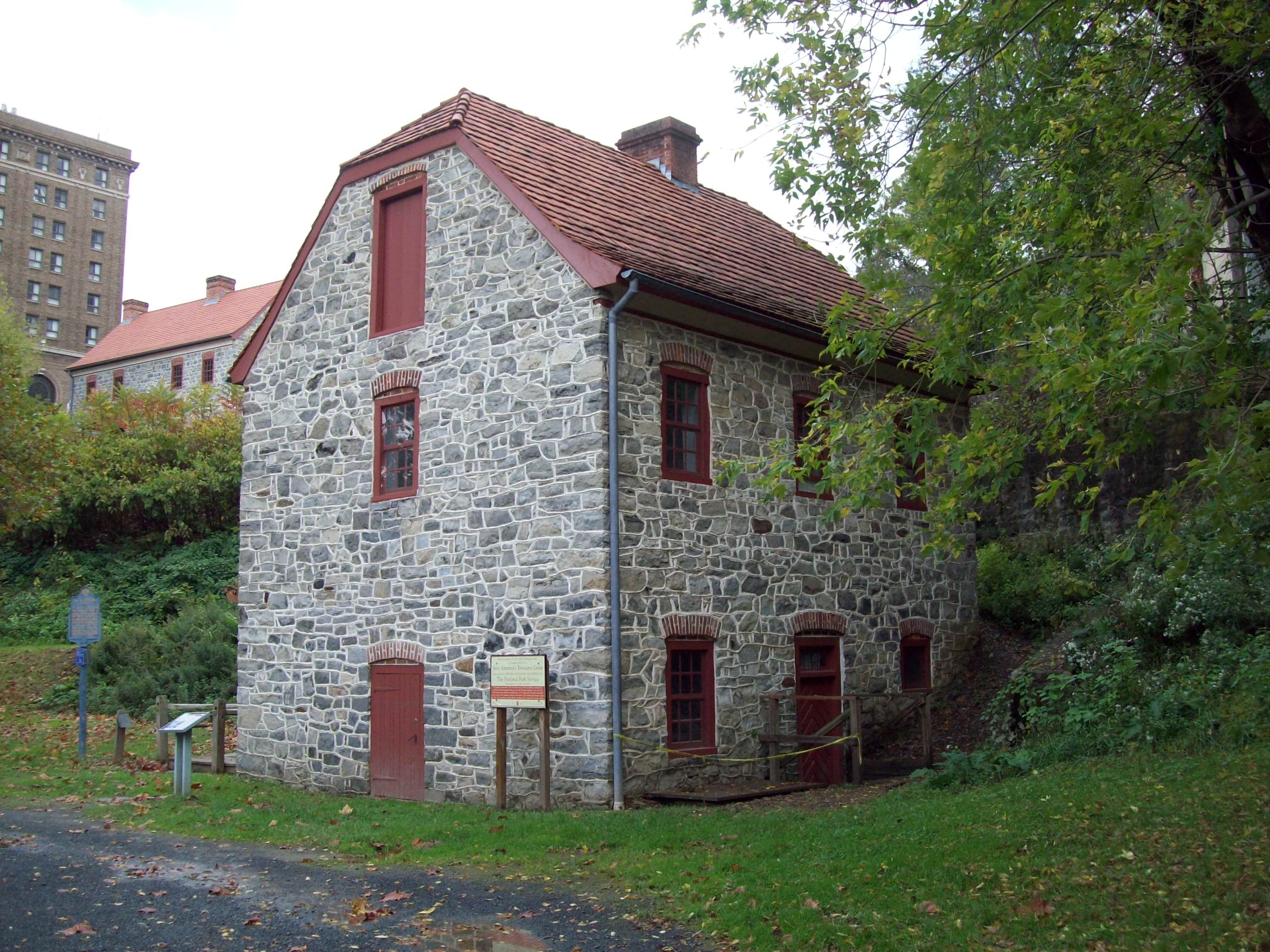
Bethlehem Waterworks in October 2011

The museum also manages properties near the creek, including the industrial 1761 Tannery building, and Bethlehem Waterworks, which is also a National Historic Landmark as the first pump-driven North American municipal water supply. This area, known as the Colonial Industrial Quarter, is also archaeologically significant, as the early Moravians developed it industrially from an early period.

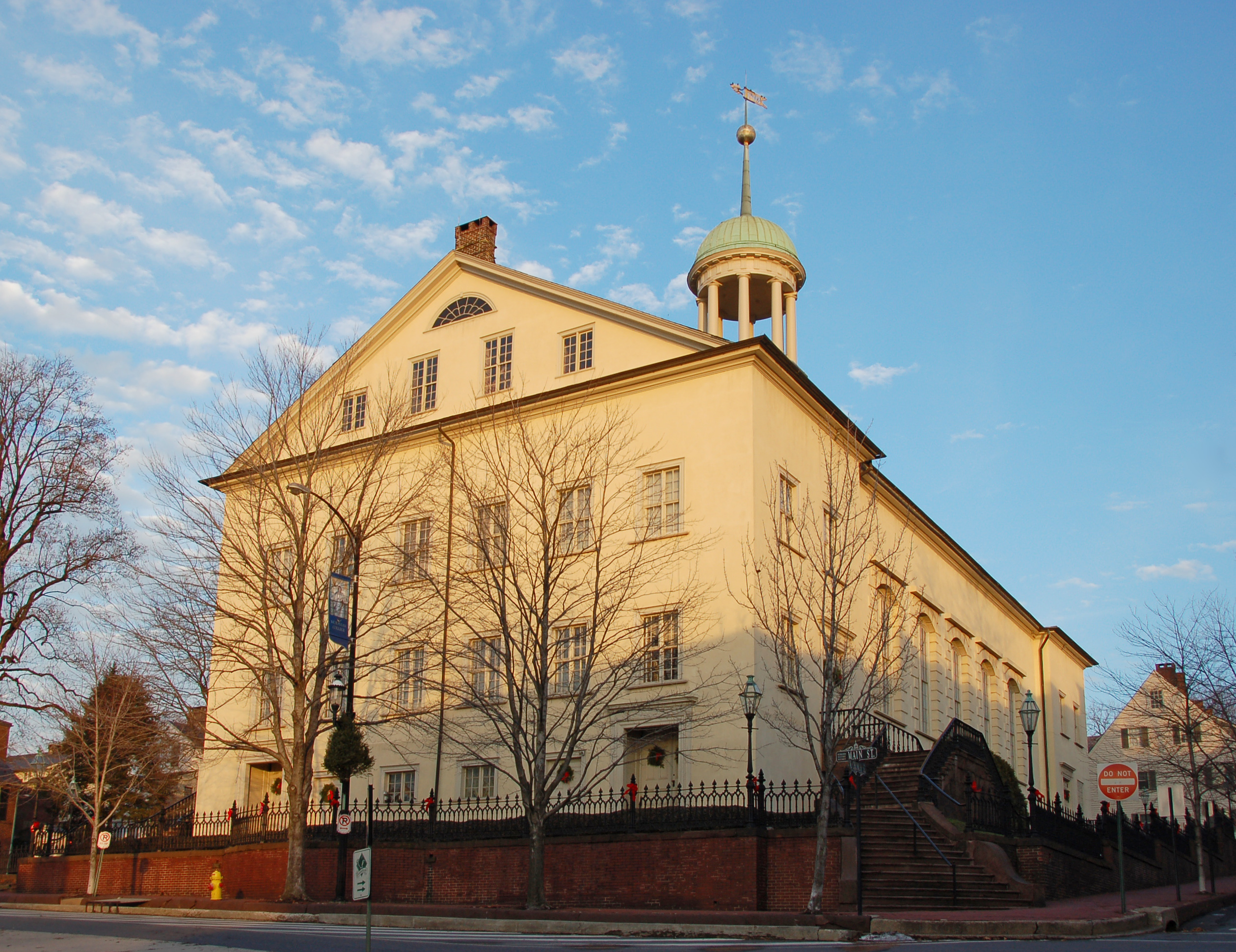
Central Moravian Church in December 2007

Non-museum properties in the district include the 1803-06 Central Moravian Church, God's Acre, a Moravian burial ground, and the 1758-60 Moravian Sun Inn, located further up Main Street. The Sun Inn was created as a place for non-Moravian people to stay when they visited Bethlehem at the time. The Sun Inn was used during the American Revolution. Its guests during the era included George Washington, Martha Washington, Benjamin Franklin, Samuel Adams, John Hancock, John Adams, and other notable Americans of the 18th century.

Bethlehem was settled in 1741, and was the first successful community established by German Moravians in North America. It became a central point for later Moravian settlements across what the present-day eastern United States. Because some of its earliest communal buildings were built in stone, they have survived into the 21st century. These buildings housed the community's single men and women, then segregated by gender, and served as the earliest places of worship in the colonial era.

Bethlehem remained under strong Moravian religious influence until the early 19th century, when the community began to become more secular. One of the living facilities segregated by sex in this area was called the Single Sisters' House and it is a place where single Moravian women would live before they were married. Widowed women lived in the Widows House, located across the street from the Single Sisters House. There were three significant additions to the Sisters House after it was built.

The original version of the Single Sisters' House was built in 1744 and was a two-story stone building that lacked a basement and a kitchens. At the time, a second version of the Sisters' House was constructed, adding a northern wing. The northern wing included a few new changes to building which were a new dormitory a larger dining area and in the later future a chapel.

The next addition that was made was the last addition made to the building. The addition included a building that was raised above the building on a basement and it was the first time that architectural detail was included in a Moravian building. The Single Sisters' House is located on West Church Street near the Bethlehem Public Library. The Single Brethren's House was a building that served the same purpose, except it was a place where single Moravian men would live. The Single Brethren's House is located on Main Street.

== See also ==
- List of World Heritage Sites in the United States
- List of National Historic Landmarks in Pennsylvania
- National Register of Historic Places listings in Northampton County, Pennsylvania
- Central Bethlehem Historic District
