= Bethlehem Waterworks =

- U.S. National Register of Historic Places
- U.S. National Historic Landmark
- U.S. National Historic Landmark District – Contributing property
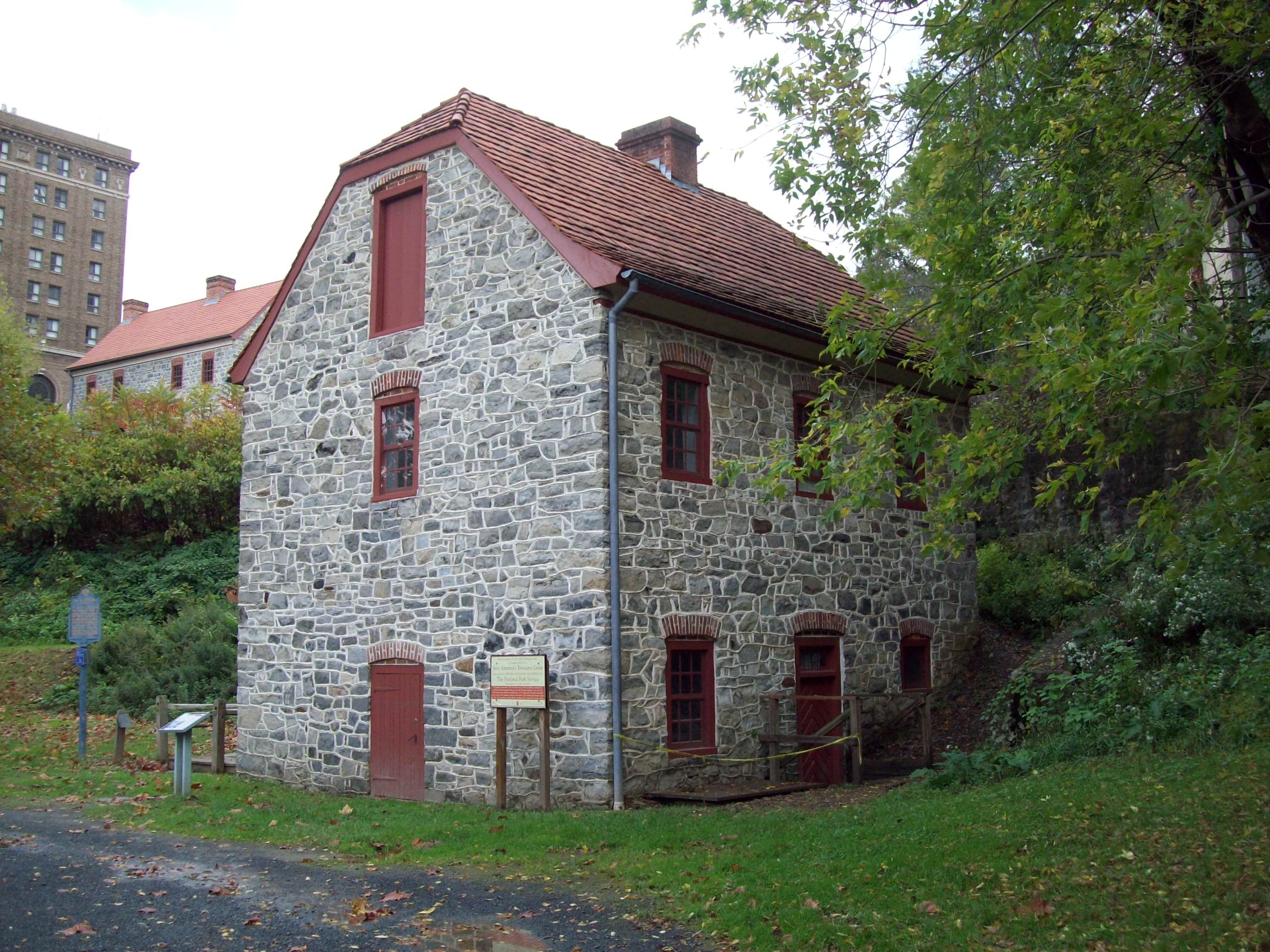
- Bethlehem Waterworks, October 2011

- Location within Pennsylvania Location within the United States
- Location: Bethlehem, Pennsylvania, U.S.
- Coordinates: 40°37′9″N 75°23′0″W
- Area: 6.2 acres (2.5 ha)
- Built: 1753
- Part of: Historic Moravian Bethlehem District (ID12001016)
- NRHP reference No.: 72001142

Significant dates
- Designated NHL: May 29, 1981
- Designated NHLDCP: October 6, 2012

The Bethlehem Waterworks, also known as the Old Waterworks or 1762 Waterworks, is believed to be the oldest pump-powered public water supply in what is now the United States. The pumphouse, which includes original and replica equipment, is located in the Colonial Industrial Quarter of Bethlehem, Pennsylvania, between Monocacy Creek and Main Street. It was declared a National Historic Civil Engineering Landmark in 1971, an American Water Landmark in 1971, and a National Historic Landmark in 1981.

The building is a contributing property to the Historic Moravian Bethlehem District, which was designated as a National Historic Landmark District in 2012 and later named to the U.S. Tentative List in 2016 for nomination to the World Heritage List.

== Description and history ==
The first waterworks in Bethlehem, Pennsylvania was designed and built by millwright Hans Chistoph Christensen from Denmark in 1755 to more efficiently bring water from the spring at the bottom of the hill to the top of the hill where most of the living quarters could be found. This spring provided a flow of 800 gallons per minute, enough to provide water for drinking, cooking, and bathing, as well as water in case of fire.

The first building was a wooden structure designed by Hans and described by Robert Rau as "the machinery was placed in a frame building, 19 by 22, a few yards east of the oil and bark mill, whither the spring water was led by a conduit into a cistern. The pump was made of lignum vitae (a hard and heavy tropical wood), the cylinder being five inches in diameter. The water was forced through wooden pipes up the hill into a wooden reservoir or distributing tank built within the little square, the site now occupied by the Moravian Church. The pipes were bored hemlock logs which had been floated down the Lehigh River from Gnadenhuetten on the Mahoning." Persistent issues with leaking and bursting pipes kept this first structure from being fully completed, despite switching from wood to lead pipes. Growing demand for water and a more efficient system required enlargement of the plant, as well as more powerful machinery. Hans later built the limestone Waterworks in 1762 to meet these needs and received thirty shillings in payment for his work.

The limestone Waterworks building is located in the floodplain of Monocacy Creek in the Colonial Industrial Quarter, an important part of the historic district of Bethlehem. It is a 2 1/2-story building, built out of limestone rubble, that is about 24 feet (7.3 m) square and covered by a red tile roof. It is set over an otherwise open holding pit, which was originally fed by a wood-lined trench from a nearby spring. There are doors on three sides, one of which is at a higher elevation owing to the sloping terrain; it provides access to a storage area on the upper level, while the other two provide access to the mechanisms on the inside. The machinery includes a replica waterwheel, reproduced from the original master craftsman's drawings which were preserved.

In colonial Bethlehem, water power replaced human and horse power. The wheel was originally turned by water supplied from the creek and provided the power needed to move water up to the settlement above. The power generated by one water wheel was the equivalent of 100 men and an undershot waterwheel powered three cast-iron pumps, forcing the water through pipes (originally wooden, later lead) into a collecting tower located nearly 94 feet uphill where Central Moravian Church stands today. From the tower, gravity carried the water into five separate cisterns on the hillside to be used by the various Choir houses. Hans' system was imperfect, with overpressure bursting wooden pipes and other problems.

Conflict later arose when the city's growth continued but the power supplied by Monocacy Creek could not match. Both the Waterworks and the Oil Mill used the same tail race to supply the power for their needs and by the early 1800s the Oil Mill had to halt productivity for two days out of the week so the Waterworks could fill the town's reservoirs. The Waterworks operations were later relocated to the Oil Mill building in 1832 due to an increase on water demands from the town that the 1762 Waterworks could not meet. The Oil Mill operated as the new Waterworks for 81 years, serving the continually growing community well into the early twentieth century. Water quality from the spring soon became a major issue with epidemics of typhoid and dysentery being traced to the water supply and, under order of the Pennsylvania Commissioner of Health, the waterworks operations were shut down permanently in January 1913.

The system is believed to be the first pump-powered water supply to be implemented in what is now the United States. Boston had a municipal water supply as early as 1652, but it was only powered by gravity. This European style of technology for municipal water distribution was not matched in America until the Philadelphia water system was completed in 1801.

Archaeological studies were conducted at the waterworks site in 1964 and 1972. In 1972 the building, the waterwheel, and the pumping mechanism were restored using the original 18th century master craftsmen's drawing in the collection of the Moravian Archives. In 2004 the waterwheel sustained damage from Hurricane Ivan, and through a Save America's Treasures Grant was restored in 2009 using those same drawings. Sections of the original wooden pipes used by the Waterworks are on display at the Moravian Museum of Bethlehem.

The 1762 Waterworks is owned by the city of Bethlehem with a long-term lease to Historic Bethlehem Inc., a member institution of Historic Bethlehem Museums & Sites, a 501(c)3 non-profit organization. The history of the 1762 Waterworks is interpreted today on guided tours. The building is presently closed to the public.

== See also ==
- List of National Historic Landmarks in Pennsylvania
- National Register of Historic Places listings in Northampton County, Pennsylvania
