= Single Sisters' House =

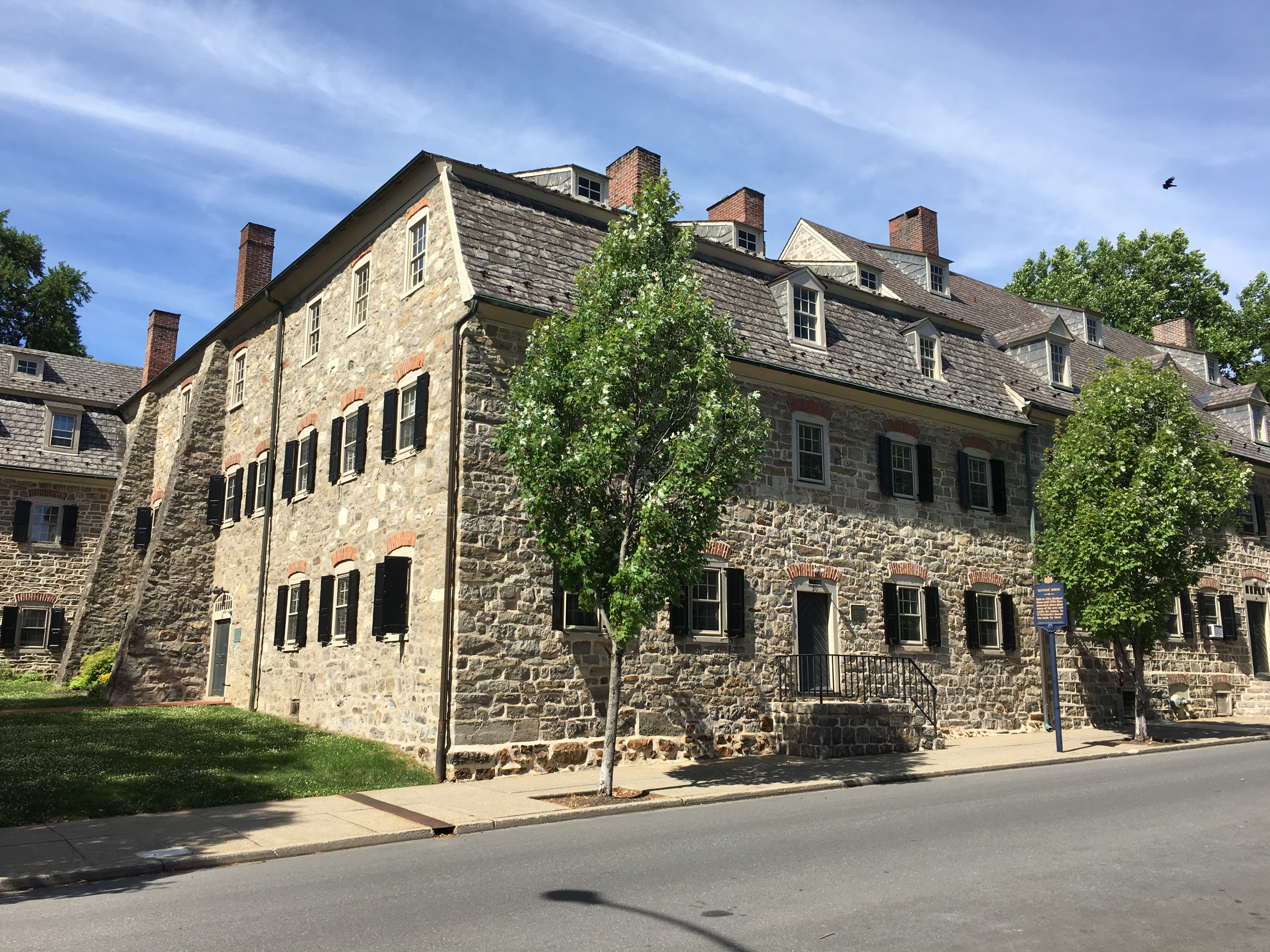
- 1744/1752 Portion of the Single Sisters' House with support buttresses visible in the background

- Location within Pennsylvania Location within the United States
- 40°37′08″N 75°22′50″W
- Location: Bethlehem, Pennsylvania, U.S.

History
- Built: 1748; 278 years ago/ 1752; 274 years ago/ 1772; 254 years ago
- Built for: Moravian Choir House
- Original use: Single Brethrens' House

Site notes
- Current use: Historic Tours, Education, Women's Programming
- Governing body: Local
- Website: HistoricBethlehem.org

The Single Sisters' House is an historic building located in Bethlehem, Pennsylvania constructed by the Moravian settlers as a Choir House for the Single Brethren in 1744, and is part of a larger building complex that also contains the 1741 Gemeinhaus, 1746 Bell House, and 1751 Old Chapel. As the community grew it was re-purposed for the Single Sisters' Choir in 1748. A fine example of Colonial Germanic style architecture, a portion of the house is still used as apartments for single women in Bethlehem, with the other portion used as a museum and programming space.

The Single Sisters' House is part of the Historic Moravian Bethlehem District which was designated as a National Historic Landmark District in 2012 and later named to the U.S. Tentative List in 2016 for nomination to the World Heritage List. It officially became a World Heritage Site as part of the Historic Moravian Bethlehem district, together with other Moravian church settlements in Denmark, Germany, and the United Kingdom.

== Description and history ==
The Single Sisters' House was constructed in 1744 as the first Choir House for the Single Brethren of the Moravian community. It was the first building in Bethlehem built of limestone in the Colonial Germanic style of architecture, featuring red brick arches over the windows and herringbone-patterned doors. What is believed to be the oldest timepiece in Bethlehem can be found on the side of the Single Sisters' House: a vertical sundial dated 1744. The Collegium Musicum, considered to be one of the earliest orchestras in America, was founded here in the same year. John Pyraleus, a Moravian missionary that worked with nearby American Indian tribes, founded what is considered to be the first school to teach American Indian languages in the American Colonies on the second floor of this building during the time it served as the Single Brethren's House.

Fifty men and several young boys lived here. The Choir grew so quickly, a larger house was needed, so plans to build a new Single Brethren's House were made. Anna Nitschmann, the spiritual leader of the Single Sisters' Choir, fought to convince the leaders of the Moravian Church to allow the Single Sisters use of the Single Brethren's House once it was empty, instead of waiting for a place in Nazareth to be built. The new Single Brethren's House, located just west of their first choir house, was finished by early November 1748. After the men and boys moved out, 21 single sisters and 29 young girls moved in on November 15, 1748, making it the new Single Sisters' House. Each floor of this section is approximately 1,200 square feet (110 m^{2}), with the first and second floors used for work space and crafts while the third floor served as a dormitory-style sleeping hall. The building provided the Single Sisters with a chapel and kitchen.

By 1752, the Single Sisters' Choir had grown so large that an addition to the house was required. The 1752 annex to the north contained the dining hall and a second dormitory, and later the chapel, or Saal, was also moved to this area. The new addition was celebrated at noon on May 10, 1752, with an historic shad banquet. "At noon we used our dining room for the first time, a number of church workers having also been invited to attend. An agreeable musical program was presented and some suitable stanzas were sung. All present had a happy time." Concern for the stability of the house's foundations and structure called for extra support of the building and in 1756 two three-story stone buttresses were added. As well, the roof tiles were removed from the building and replaced by shingles.

As the Single Sisters' Choir continued to grow, a second addition to the east was constructed in 1772 that provided a basement kitchen and dining area. In the mid-1800s, the rooms of the Single Sisters' House changed over to apartments to be rented out to unmarried and independent women of the Moravian community. Over time, the building changed and adapted to community needs. On May 16, 1939, a museum was opened within one of the rooms of the Single Sisters' House – the precursor to the current Moravian Museum of Bethlehem. As the museum grew it expanded to two rooms, but ultimately there was not enough space. The museum eventually moved to the Gemeinhaus and the rooms in the Single Sisters' House were returned to residency.

"In the 1960s the basement of the 1772 Eastern Addition served as a fallout shelter where rations were also stored, and, in the 1980s, the dining room in the 1752 wing became an exercise room for the women to do aerobics." In 1958 a small addition located between the eastern and northern extensions of the house was built to provide modern bathrooms.

Women continued to live in the 1744/1752 portion of the Single Sisters' House until 2007. The last remaining tenant lived there continuously since 1949 when she came to Bethlehem with her mother. Afterwards this section of the house became a museum as part of the Moravian Museum of Bethlehem where preservation work began while the 1772 section remained a private residence and closed to the public.

The 1744 section of the Single Sisters' House remains virtually unchanged from its original state. Some of the rooms contain original fireplaces and stoves and the main hall has square brick paver flooring dating from the 1740s-50s. "The building's interior is simple with its whitewashed walls, but remarkably well-preserved. Iron door locks, latches and hinges, original hardware from settlement's 18th century smithy are still in place, as are the original wooden floor planks, herringbone-patterned doors, arched windows and roof dormers." The Saal still contains its original floorboards, turned wooden posts, and double entrance doors with original hardware.

A gallery featuring copies of painted portraits and biographical sketches of the Single Sisters can be found in the 1752 wing. The portraits were painted by Moravian Church artist John Valentine Haidt in the mid-late 1700s. Artifacts of Moravian Missions, in which the women regularly participated, can also be found on display. Visitors will find rocks in one of the windowsills – the Single Sisters were rumored to have piled rocks in their windows as a form of protection from attack during the French and Indian war in the 1750s.

The Single Sisters' House is owned by the Bethlehem Area Moravians with the 1744/1752 section leased to the Moravian Museum of Bethlehem which is part of Historic Bethlehem Museums & Sites, a 501(c)3 non-profit organization.

The Single Sisters' House is part of the Historic Moravian Bethlehem District which was designated as a National Historic Landmark District in 2012 and later named to the U.S. Tentative List in 2016 for nomination to the World Heritage List. It officially became a World Heritage Site as part of the Historic Moravian Bethlehem district, together with other Moravian church settlements in Denmark, Germany, and the United Kingdom.

== The Single Sisters' Choir of Bethlehem ==
The Single Sisters' Choir consisted of girls from age 12 to older women of various European nationalities, as well as African American women and American Indian women. Under the General Economy of colonial Bethlehem, individuals gave their labor to the community in return for food, shelter, medical care, and education. The Single Sisters could be found fulfilling skills and duties such as cooking, sewing, weaving, spinning, gardening, teaching, clothes-making, and care-taking. Within the Single Sisters' Choir women were able to establish themselves as equals to men within the community. They served in many roles such as educators, leaders, ordained ministers, artists, innovators, and farmers that, elsewhere in the colonies and the broader world, were only afforded to men. "In a time when most other women had to rely on men to survive financially, these women supported and mentored each other."

Following the end of the General Economy in Bethlehem in the 1760s, Choir residents were expected to pay for their lodgings. "...each single sister who resided in the Choir House in June 1772 paid the following weekly amounts: for board, three shillings; toward interest on the House, four pence; as share in civic expenses, one penny; for dormitory privilege and house lamps, two pence; for room, three coppers [i.e. farthings]; a sister who only used the dormitory of the house paid six coppers; one who lived away from the House was expected to contribute four coppers a week to the Choir; thus each sister spent thirteen pounds per annum in addition to the cost of her clothing and laundry."

Among notable women living at the Single Sisters' House was Sister Maria Beaumont, considered a renowned pianist in Bethlehem; Sister Anna Rosina Kliest, an avid writer, painting instructor, and notable botanist; and Polly Heckewelder, daughter of Moravian Missionaries from Ohio who organized the Soldier's Relief Society of Central Moravian Church in 1861 and for whom the Moravian "Polly Dolls" are named.

The sense of community and support found within the Single Sisters' Choir was so powerful that it outlasted the end of the General Economy in the 1760s. The Single Sisters Choir was the last Choir to remain in Bethlehem, surviving the Single Brethren's Choir by some 34 years, and dissolved in the mid-1800s.
