= Joseph Thoder =

Joseph John Thoder, Jr. (born January 25, 1956, in Bethlehem, Pennsylvania) is Interim Chair and John W. Lachman Professor of Orthopaedics and Sports Medicine at Temple University School of Medicine.

== Career ==
Graduating from Moravian College in Bethlehem, Pennsylvania with a Bachelor of Science degree in chemistry in 1977, he attended Temple University School of Medicine (Philadelphia) in 1982. Upon completing his internship at Episcopal Hospital, he began his residency in orthopaedic surgery at Temple University Hospital.
