= The Tannery (Bethlehem, Pennsylvania) =

- U.S. National Register of Historic Places
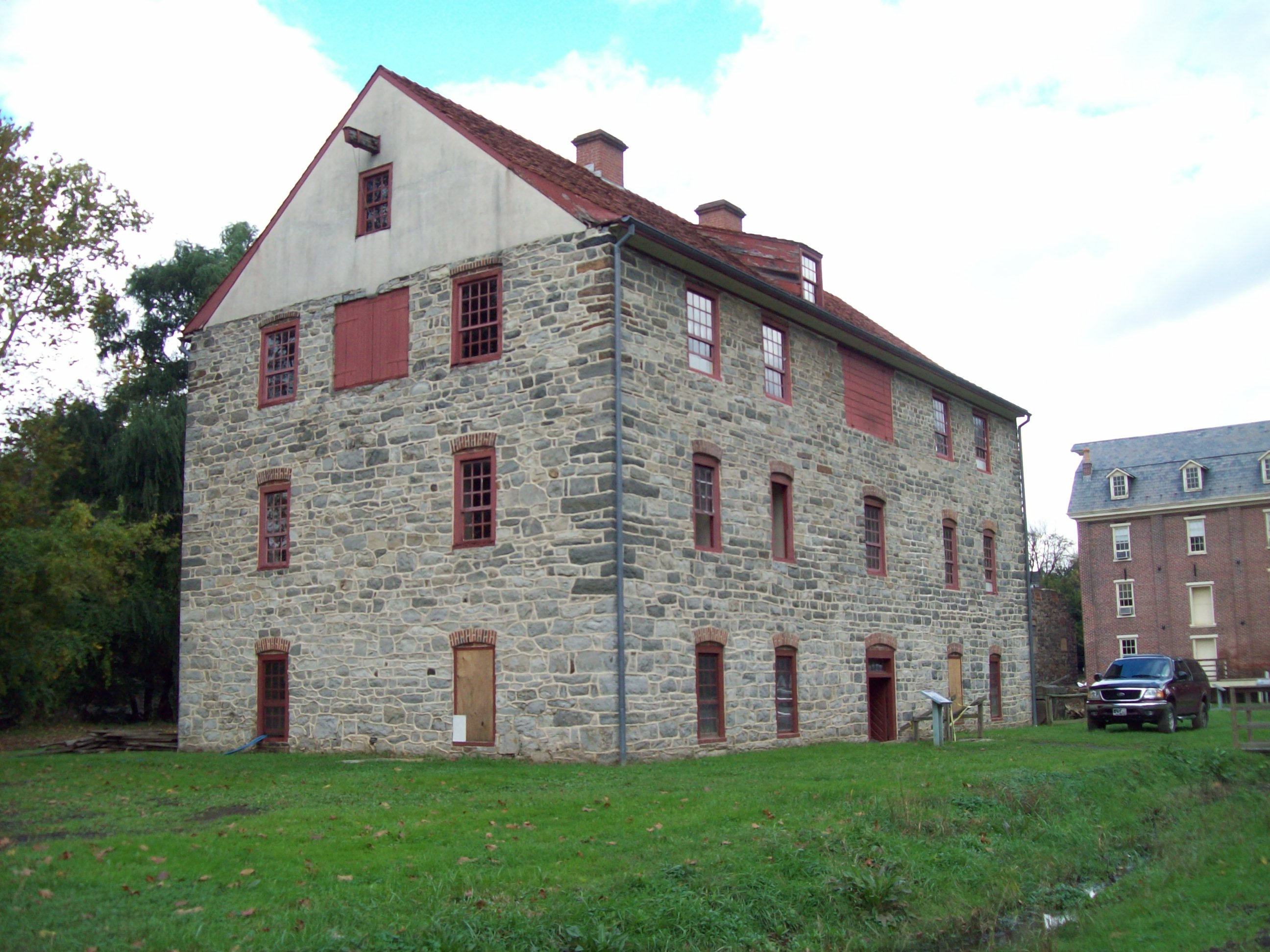
- The Tannery, October 2011

- Location within Pennsylvania Location within the United States
- Location: Within Bethlehem Historic Subdistrict A near Monocacy Creek, Bethlehem, Pennsylvania
- Coordinates: 40°37′11″N 75°23′2″W
- Area: 3 acres (1.2 ha)
- Built: 1761
- NRHP reference No.: 72001143
- Added to NRHP: June 19, 1972

The Tannery is a historic tannery building constructed by the colonial Moravians in Bethlehem, Northampton County, Pennsylvania. It is a limestone building built in 1761, and is part of the Bethlehem Colonial Industrial Quarter.

It was added to the National Register of Historic Places in 1972. The building is part of the Historic Moravian Bethlehem District which was designated as a National Historic Landmark District in 2012 and later nominated to the U.S. Tentative List in 2016 for consideration to become a World Heritage Site.

== Description and history ==
The tannery was originally built as a small log structure in 1743 along the east side of the Grist Mill, which is now Luckenbach Mill. Leather was both an important material and a valuable commodity in early Bethlehemm, making the need for the tannery all the greater and one of the most profitable industries. It supplied the necessary leather for shoemakers, harness makers, and saddlers in Bethlehem, Nazareth, and the surrounding areas.

As the community grew, so did the tanning operation, and a larger, more permanent stone structure was built on the west side of the tail race in 1761. It was constructed as a 35 ft. by 66 ft., five bay, three-story limestone building with a one-story attic, built in the German Colonial style of architecture.

By the 1760s, the colonial Moravians processed 1000-2000 animal hides at the Tannery annually and produced a large variety of leather products such as clothing, shoes, harnesses, and machinery parts. It was one of their most profitable trades. When trade with England ended due to the American Revolution, the need for leather rose significantly. Leather boots, caps, coats, buckets, and saddles were in high demand for the Continental Army. The Tannery increased processed animal hides to an estimated 3000 annually.

The Tannery was operated by the Moravians until 1829 and tanning ceased in 1873 due to the rising price of tanbark. The structure was converted into a multi-family dwelling and was then used for various operations. The building eventually deteriorated to the point of becoming a tenement house surrounded by an automobile junk yard.

“It is interesting to note that, when the Tannery was constructed in 1761, the first floor would have been accessed by walking up steps rather than down as we do today. Archaeological excavations found changes in the creek bank along with soil deposits around the Tannery, indicating heavy fill. These discoveries confirmed that the original level of the land was seven or eight feet lower than it is now, or about four feet lower than the current Tannery doorway opening.”

The Tannery was restored between 1968 and 1971 by John Milner Associates as an historic site interpreting the 18th century tanning operations. After restoration was complete the building was open to the public for tours and educational programming from the late 1970s. Continued restoration from grants received allowed the opening of the vat room in 2001 which had previously not been accessible due to deterioration of the viewing platforms. It closed in 2004 due to damages from hurricane Ivan.

The Tannery is owned by the city of Bethlehem with a long-term lease to Historic Bethlehem Museums & Sites, a 501(c)3 non-profit organization. The building is not presently open to the public.

== The tanning process ==
In the 18th century turning animal hides into tanned leather was a lengthy, seven-step process that could take up to two years or longer. The work required a great deal of strength as the wet hides could weigh several hundred pounds. "In 1790, for example, David Gold gave up his job after several years because of what he described as a 'weakness in his arms'. Most of the tanners in Bethlehem came directly from Germany."

“First the hides had to be washed, cleaned, and trimmed. Next they were soaked in a lime solution for several weeks; this facilitated ‘beaming,’ the subsequent scraping of the hide to remove the hair and any remaining flesh. The hides were then soaked for many weeks in a ‘bating’ solution, a foul-smelling mixture of water, salt, and manure that neutralized any remaining lime and also altered the chemical structure of the skin to make it more flexible. Next came the actual tanning step of immersing the hides in a vat filled with tanbark and its rich ‘liquor’ extra for six to twelve months. Afterwards the leather was beaten or fulled to make it more pliable and then carefully dried. Soft, waterproof leathers with a smooth finish required further treatment by a currier.”

Tanbark was an essential ingredient in the tanning process. Each hide required one to two times its weight in bark for proper tanning, with the tannery consuming 60 to 100 cords (218 to 363 cubic meters) of tanbark annually. Oak and hemlock barks were gathered in the spring and dried, then stored in a shed to protect from the rain until needed. The tanbark was then reduced to a coarse powder at the tanbark mill using a contemporary German practice of bark stamping. This set the Moravians apart as most early American bark mills utilized animal-powered stone rollers to crush the bark.

== Gallery ==
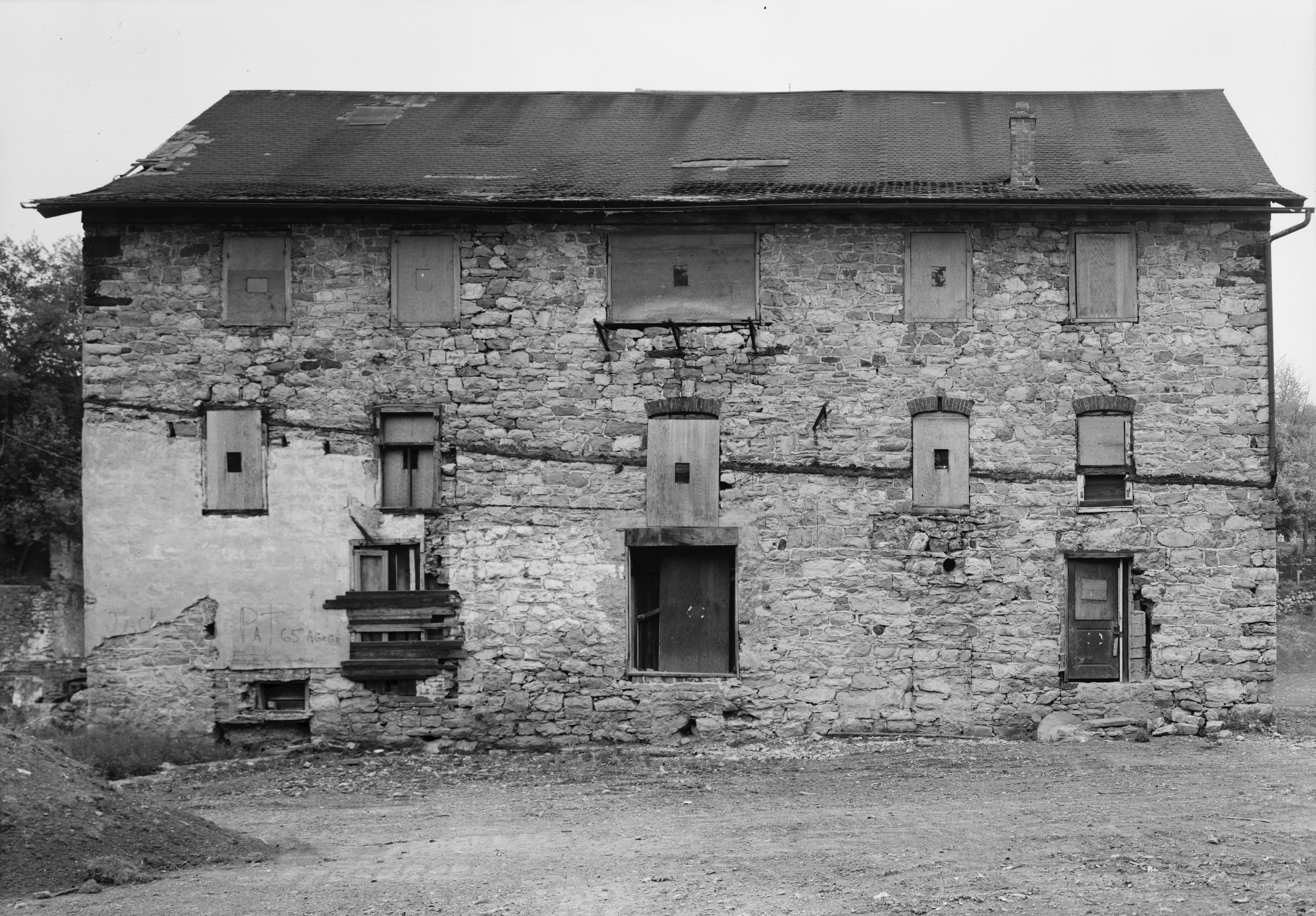
The Tannery, November 1968
