= Janine Jagger =

American epidemiologist

- Born: c. 1950 (age 75–76)
- Education: Moravian College; University of Pittsburgh; University of Virginia
- Awards: MacArthur Fellows Program
- Scientific career
- Fields: epidemiology
- Workplaces: University of Virginia

Janine Jagger (born c. 1950) is an American epidemiologist, Becton Dickinson Professor of Research of Internal Medicine and Infectious Diseases, and director of the International Health Care Worker Safety Center at the University of Virginia School of Medicine.

== Life ==
She graduated from Moravian College with a Bachelor of Arts, cum laude, in Psychology in 1972, and from the University of Pittsburgh with a Master of Public Health in 1974, and from University of Virginia with a Ph.D. in 1987. She has been devoted to reducing needle stick injuries.

== Awards ==
- 2002 MacArthur Fellows Program

== Works ==
- Prevention and Control of Nosocomial Infections, Editor Richard P Wenzel, Lippincott Williams & Wilkins; Fourth Edition (December 15, 2002), ISBN 978-0-7817-3512-4
- Preventing occupational exposures to bloodborne pathogens: articles from advances in exposures prevention, 1994-2003, Editors Janine Jagger, Jane L. Perry, International Healthcare Worker Safety Center, University of Virginia, 2004, ISBN 978-0-9655899-1-8
- "Progress in Preventing Sharps Injuries in the United States", Handbook of Modern Hospital Safety, Second Edition, CRC Press, 2009, ISBN 978-1-4200-4785-1
