= List of National Historic Landmarks in Pennsylvania =

This is a List of National Historic Landmarks in Pennsylvania. There are 169 in the state. Listed in the tables below are the 102 NHLs outside Philadelphia. For the 67 within Philadelphia, see List of National Historic Landmarks in Philadelphia.

Three of these sites are shared with other states and are credited by the National Park Service as being located in those other states: the Delaware and Hudson Canal (centered in New York but extending into Pennsylvania); the Beginning Point of the U.S. Public Land Survey (on the Ohio–Pennsylvania border); and the Minisink Archeological Site, on the New Jersey-Pennsylvania border.

== Key ==
| | National Historic Landmark |
| ^{†} | National Historic Landmark District |
| ^{#} | National Historic Site, National Historical Park, National Memorial, or National Monument |
| ^{*} | Delisted Landmark |

== National Historic Landmarks in Pennsylvania (excluding Philadelphia) ==
Following are National Historic Landmarks in Pennsylvania, but outside Philadelphia. For consistency, the National Historic Landmark name is used to label each one.

| | Landmark name | Image | Date designated | Location | County | Description |
|---|---|---|---|---|---|---|
| 1 | 1762 Waterworks | 1762 Waterworks | May 29, 1981 (#72001142) | Bethlehem; 40°37′09″N 75°23′00″W | Northampton | The oldest municipal waterworks in the nation. |
| 2 | Edward G. Acheson House | Edward G. Acheson House | May 11, 1976 (#76001679) | Monongahela 908 Main Street; 40°12′20″N 79°56′02″W | Washington | Home of self-taught inventor-engineer Edward G. Acheson, where in 1891 he invented carborundum. |
| 3 | Allegheny County Courthouse and Jail | Allegheny County Courthouse and Jail | May 11, 1976 (#73001586) | Pittsburgh; 436 Grant Street; 40°26′18″N 79°59′46″W | Allegheny | Spectacular jail and courthouse designed by architect Henry Hobson Richardson in a Romanesque style. |
| 4^{#} | Allegheny Portage Railroad of the Pennsylvania Canal | Allegheny Portage Railroad of the Pennsylvania Canal | December 29, 1962 (#66000648) | Johnstown; 40°27′15″N 78°32′25″W | Blair | Railroad that transported canalboats over the Allegheny Mountains, between the eastern and western sections of the Pennsylvania Canal; regarded as a technological marvel. |
| 5 | Andalusia | Andalusia | November 13, 1966 (#66000649) | Andalusia; 40°03′43″N 74°57′30″W | Bucks | Greek Revival residence of Nicholas Biddle, head of the Second Bank of the United States. |
| 6 | Henry Antes House | Henry Antes House | April 27, 1992 (#75001657) | Pottstown; 40°17′25″N 75°32′26″W | Montgomery | Headquarters of George Washington, September 23 to 26, 1777. |
| 7 | Augustus Lutheran Church | Augustus Lutheran Church | December 24, 1967 (#67000019) | Trappe; 40°12′03″N 75°28′50″W | Montgomery | |
| 8^{†} | Bedford Springs Hotel Historic District | Bedford Springs Hotel Historic District | July 17, 1991 (#84001413) | Bedford; 39°59′47″N 78°30′28″W | Bedford | |
| 9 | Beginning Point of the U.S. Public Land Survey | Beginning Point of the U.S. Public Land Survey | June 23, 1965 (#66000606) | Ohioville, PA and East Liverpool, OH; 40°38′26″N 80°31′10″W | Beaver, PA and Columbiana, OH | |
| 10 | Beth Sholom Synagogue | Beth Sholom Synagogue | March 29, 2007 (#07000430) | Elkins Park 8231 Old York Road; 40°04′56″N 75°07′36″W | Montgomery | Frank Lloyd Wright designed it. The American Institute of Architects and National Trust for Historic Preservation commented upon it. |
| 11 | Bomberger's Distillery | Bomberger's Distillery | January 16, 1980 (#75001649) | Newmanstown; 40°16′30″N 76°19′13″W | Lebanon | |
| 12 | Bost Building | Bost Building | January 20, 1999 (#99000627) | Homestead; 621–623 East 8th Avenue; 40°24′33″N 79°54′16″W | Allegheny | Headquarters of the Amalgamated Association of Iron and Steel Workers during the Homestead Strike. |
| 13 | Braddock Carnegie Library | Braddock Carnegie Library | March 2, 2012 (#73001585) | Braddock; 40°24′07″N 79°51′56″W | Allegheny | First Carnegie library built in the United States. |
| 14 | David Bradford House | David Bradford House | July 28, 1983 (#73001668) | Washington 175 South Main Street; 40°10′06″N 80°14′41″W | Washington | A home of David Bradford. |
| 15^{†} | Brandywine Battlefield | Brandywine Battlefield | January 20, 1961 (#66000660) | Chadds Ford; 39°52′31″N 75°34′31″W | Delaware | Site of the 1777 Battle of Brandywine. |
| 16 | William Brinton 1704 House | William Brinton 1704 House | December 24, 1967 (#67000018) | Dilworthtown; 39°53′40″N 75°33′40″W | Delaware | |
| 17^{†} | Bryn Athyn Historic District | Bryn Athyn Historic District | October 6, 2008 (#08001087) | Bryn Athyn; 40°08′04″N 75°03′48″W | Montgomery | |
| 18 | James Buchanan House (Wheatland) | James Buchanan House (Wheatland) | July 4, 1961 (#66000669) | Lancaster; 40°02′37″N 76°19′45″W | Lancaster | Home of James Buchanan while he was President and in his final years. |
| 19 | Pearl S. Buck House | Pearl S. Buck House | January 16, 1980 (#74001755) | Perkasie 520 Dublin Road; 40°21′36″N 75°13′11″W | Bucks | A home of author Pearl S. Buck. |
| 20 | Buckingham Friends Meeting House | Buckingham Friends Meeting House | July 31, 2003 (#97000291) | Buckingham Township 5684 Lower York Road; 40°20′56″N 75°02′27″W | Bucks | Associated with the Religious Society of Friends (Quakers). |
| 21 | Bushy Run Battlefield | Bushy Run Battlefield | October 9, 1960 (#66000696) | Harrison City 2 miles E. of Harrison City on PA Route 993; 40°21′19″N 79°37′12″W | Westmoreland | Site of the Battle of Bushy Run during Pontiac's Rebellion. |
| 22^{†} | Cambria Iron Company | Cambria Iron Company | June 22, 1989 (#89001101) | Johnstown; 40°20′10″N 78°55′23″W | Cambria | |
| 23 | Simon Cameron House | Simon Cameron House | May 15, 1975 (#73001620) | Harrisburg 219 South Front Street; 40°15′23″N 76°52′45″W | Dauphin | A home of Simon Cameron, a political boss who served briefly in the cabinet of Abraham Lincoln. |
| 24^{†} | Carlisle Indian School | Carlisle Indian School | July 4, 1961 (#66000658) | Carlisle; 40°12′32″N 77°10′41″W | Cumberland | Associated with Native American education. Athlete Jim Thorpe attended. |
| 25^{†} | Carrie Blast Furnaces 6 and 7 | Carrie Blast Furnaces 6 and 7 | September 20, 2006 (#06001070) | Rankin, Munhall, and Swissvale boroughs Northern side of the Monongahela River, 0.5 miles (0.80 km) west of the Rankin Bridge; 40°24′47″N 79°53′24″W | Allegheny | The only 2 surviving pre-World War II blast furnaces in the Pittsburgh area. |
| 26 | Cedarcroft | Cedarcroft | November 11, 1971 (#71000693) | Kennett Square; 39°51′28″N 75°43′09″W | Chester | |
| 27^{†} | Chatham Village | Chatham Village | April 5, 2005 (#98001372) | Pittsburgh; Roughly bounded by Virginia Avenue, Bigham Street, Woodruff Street, Saw Mill Run Boulevard, and Olympia Road; 40°25′52″N 80°01′01″W | Allegheny | |
| 28^{†} | Cornwall Iron Furnace | Cornwall Iron Furnace | November 3, 1966 (#66000671) | Cornwall Rexmont Road & Boyd Street; 40°16′14″N 76°24′22″W | Lebanon | |
| 29^{†} | Delaware Canal | Delaware Canal | December 8, 1976 (#74001756) | Easton to Bristol Easton to Bristol along the Delaware River; 40°05′36″N 74°51′27″W | Bucks and Northampton | Transported anthracite coal. |
| 30 | Delaware and Hudson Canal | Delaware and Hudson Canal | October 18, 1968 (#68000051) | Lackawaxen, PA, Honesdale, PA, Kingston, NY, Rosendale, NY, Ellenville, NY, and Port Jervis, NY; 41°36′26″N 74°26′53″W | Pike, PA, Wayne, PA, Orange, NY, Sullivan, NY, and Ulster, NY | |
| 31 | Drake Oil Well | Drake Oil Well | November 13, 1966 (#66000695) | Titusville; 41°36′39″N 79°39′28″W | Venango | Edwin L. Drake struck oil here, the site of the world's first successful oil well. |
| 32 | East Broad Top Railroad | East Broad Top Railroad | January 28, 1964 (#66000666) | Rockhill; 40°14′29″N 77°53′56″W | Huntingdon | |
| 33^{#} | Dwight D. Eisenhower Farmstead | Dwight D. Eisenhower Farmstead | May 23, 1966 (#67000017) | Gettysburg; 39°47′36″N 77°15′48″W | Adams | A home of Dwight Eisenhower. |
| 34 | Emmanuel Episcopal Church | Emmanuel Episcopal Church | February 16, 2000 (#74001737) | Pittsburgh; North and Allegheny Avenues; 40°27′11″N 80°01′09″W | Allegheny | |
| 35 | Ephrata Cloister | Ephrata Cloister | December 24, 1967 (#67000026) | Ephrata; 40°10′59″N 76°11′21″W | Lancaster | |
| 36 | Wharton Esherick House and Studio | Wharton Esherick House and Studio | April 19, 1993 (#73001615) | Malvern; 40°05′02″N 75°29′38″W | Chester | Studio of Wharton Esherick who participated in the Arts and Crafts Movement. |
| 37 | David Espy House | David Espy House | July 28, 1983 (#74001750) | Bedford; 40°01′09″N 78°30′11″W | Bedford | Associated with Whiskey Rebellion and David Espy. |
| 38 | Fallingwater | Fallingwater | May 11, 1976 (#74001781) | Mill Run; 39°54′17″N 79°28′05″W | Fayette | Designed by Frank Lloyd Wright. |
| 39^{†} | Fonthill, Mercer Museum and Moravian Pottery and Tile Works | Fonthill, Mercer Museum and Moravian Pottery and Tile Works | February 4, 1985 (#85002366) | Doylestown; 40°19′23″N 75°07′25″W | Bucks | Three sites associated with Henry Chapman Mercer. |
| 40 | Forks of the Ohio | Forks of the Ohio | October 9, 1960 (#66000643) | Pittsburgh; Point Park; 40°26′27″N 80°00′37″W | Allegheny | Associated with French and Indian War. |
| 41 | Fulton Opera House | Fulton Opera House | January 29, 1964 (#69000156) | Lancaster 12–14 North Prince Street; 40°02′17″N 76°18′28″W | Lancaster | Named for Robert Fulton, it is one of the oldest continuously-operated theaters. |
| 42 | Robert Fulton Birthplace | Robert Fulton Birthplace | January 29, 1964 (#66000670) | Quarryville 8 miles south of Quarryville on U.S. Route 22; 39°48′17″N 76°09′37″W | Lancaster | Also associated with Robert Fulton. |
| 43^{#} | Albert Gallatin House | Albert Gallatin House | January 12, 1965 (#66000663) | Point Marion; 39°46′40″N 79°55′45″W | Fayette | A home of Albert Gallatin. |
| 44 | Gemeinhaus-Lewis David de Schweinitz Residence | Gemeinhaus-Lewis David de Schweinitz Residence | May 15, 1975 (#75001658) | Bethlehem; 40°37′00″N 75°22′52″W | Northampton | A home of botanist Lewis David de Schweinitz. |
| 45 | Graeme Park | Graeme Park | October 9, 1960 (#66000672) | Horsham; 40°13′00″N 75°09′00″W | Montgomery | |
| 46 | Grey Towers | Grey Towers | February 4, 1985 (#80003578) | Glenside; 40°04′46″N 75°09′54″W | Montgomery | Designed by Horace Trumbauer. Now part of Arcadia University. |
| 47 | Gruber Wagon Works | Gruber Wagon Works | December 22, 1977 (#72001092) | Reading; 40°22′14″N 75°58′47″W | Berks | Located in what is now Tulpehocken Creek Park. |
| 48^{†} | Historic Moravian Bethlehem District | Historic Moravian Bethlehem District | October 16, 2012 (#12001016) | Bethlehem; 40°37′08″N 75°22′51″W | Northampton | |
| 49 | I. N. and Bernardine Hagan House | I. N. and Bernardine Hagan House | May 16, 2000 (#00000708) | Chalk Hill; 39°52′09″N 79°31′11″W | Fayette | A higher end Usonian house of those designed by Frank Lloyd Wright. |
| 50^{†} | Harmony Historic District | Harmony Historic District | May 30, 1974 (#73002139) | Harmony; 40°48′11″N 80°07′42″W | Butler | Associated with Harmony Society and George Rapp. |
| 51 | Harrisburg Station and Trainshed | Harrisburg Station and Trainshed | December 8, 1976 (#75001638) | Harrisburg; 40°15′36″N 76°52′40″W | Dauphin | Pennsylvania Railroad station with sheds using truss system patented by Albert Fink. |
| 52 | Milton S. Hershey Mansion | Milton S. Hershey Mansion | May 4, 1983 (#78002388) | Hershey Mansion Road; 40°17′18″N 76°38′39″W | Dauphin | A home of Milton Snavely Hershey. |
| 53^{†} | Honey Hollow Watershed | Honey Hollow Watershed | August 4, 1969 (#69000155) | New Hope; 40°22′26″N 75°00′27″W | Bucks | |
| 54 | Horseshoe Curve | Horseshoe Curve | November 13, 1966 (#66000647) | Altoona; 40°29′45″N 78°28′54″W | Blair | A horseshoe-shaped railroad track |
| 55 | Keim Homestead | Keim Homestead | December 23, 2016 (#100000832) | Pike Township; 40°24′35″N 75°44′54″W | Berks | |
| 56 | Kennywood Park | Kennywood Park | February 27, 1987 (#87000824) | West Mifflin; 4800 Kennywood Boulevard; 40°23′15″N 79°51′48″W | Allegheny | From trolley park era, One of America's first amusement parks. |
| 57 | Leap-The-Dips | Leap-The-Dips | June 19, 1996 (#91000229) | Altoona 700 Park Avenue; 40°28′15″N 78°23′48″W | Blair | The oldest wooden rollercoaster still standing in the United States. |
| 58 | F. Julius Lemoyne House | F. Julius Lemoyne House | September 25, 1997 (#97001271) | Washington 49 East Maiden Street; 40°10′05″N 80°14′35″W | Washington | A home of F. Julius LeMoyne, involved with the Underground Railroad |
| 59 | Lightfoot Mill | Lightfoot Mill | April 5, 2005 (#73001616) | Chester Springs; 40°04′53″N 75°38′40″W | Chester | See also Oliver Evans. |
| 60^{†} | Lukens Historic District | Lukens Historic District | April 19, 1994 (#94001186) | Coatesville 50, 53, 76 & 102 South First Street; 39°58′52″N 75°49′21″W | Chester | Associated with Rebecca Lukens and Brandywine Ironworks (later Lukens Steel Company). |
| 61 | Humphry Marshall House | Humphry Marshall House | December 23, 1987 (#87002596) | Marshallton 1407 South Strasburg Road/PA Route 162; 39°56′52″N 75°40′53″W | Chester | A home of Humphry Marshall. |
| 62 | Meadowcroft Rockshelter | Meadowcroft Rockshelter | April 5, 2005 (#78002480) | West of Avella; 40°17′11″N 80°29′30″W | Washington | Archaeological site associated with Native Americans. |
| 63 | Isaac Meason House | Isaac Meason House | June 21, 1990 (#71000707) | Mount Braddock; 39°57′14″N 79°38′53″W | Fayette | A home of Isaac Meason. |
| 64 | Merion Cricket Club | Merion Cricket Club | February 27, 1987 (#87000759) | Haverford; 40°00′56″N 75°18′01″W | Montgomery | From when cricket competed with baseball for American attention. |
| 65 | Merion Friends Meeting House | Merion Friends Meeting House | August 5, 1998 (#98001194) | Merion Station; 40°00′32″N 75°15′11″W | Montgomery | |
| 66^{†} | Merion Golf Club | Merion Golf Club | April 27, 1992 (#89002085) | Ardmore; 39°59′36″N 75°19′35″W | Delaware | Associated with Bobby Jones, who won the Grand Slam of Golf here in 1930. Host of many U.S. Opens. |
| 67 | Mill Grove | Mill Grove | May 5, 1989 (#72001138) | Audubon; 40°07′23″N 75°26′39″W | Montgomery | A home of John James Audubon. |
| 68 | Minisink Archeological Site | Minisink Archeological Site | April 19, 1993 (#93000608) | Bushkill; 41°17′26″N 74°49′44″W | Pike | Prehistoric native site; extends into New Jersey. |
| 69 | George Nakashima Woodworker Complex | George Nakashima Woodworker Complex | April 23, 2014 (#08000782) | Solebury Township; 40°20′25″N 74°57′20″W | Bucks | Art studio and home of woodworker George Nakashima |
| 70^{†} | Oakmont Country Club | Oakmont Country Club | June 30, 1987 (#84003090) | Oakmont; 40°31′33″N 79°49′36″W | Allegheny | Built 1903, one of the first top-caliber golf courses anywhere. |
| 71^{†} | Old Economy | Old Economy | June 23, 1965 (#66000644) | Ambridge; 40°35′46″N 80°13′59″W | Beaver | Associated with Harmony Society and George Rapp. |
| 72 | Old West, Dickinson College | Old West, Dickinson College | June 13, 1962 (#66000659) | Carlisle; 40°12′10″N 77°11′42″W | Cumberland | Designed by Benjamin H. Latrobe, part of Dickinson College which was founded by Benjamin Rush. James Buchanan, later president, lived here. |
| 73 | Asa Packer Mansion | Asa Packer Mansion | February 4, 1985 (#74001765) | Jim Thorpe; 40°51′52″N 75°44′18″W | Carbon | Designed by Samuel Sloan, home of Asa Packer, founder of the Lehigh Valley Railroad and Lehigh University. |
| 74^{†} | Pennsylvania State Capitol Complex | Pennsylvania State Capitol Complex | September 20, 2006 (#77001162) | Harrisburg; Bounded by 3rd and 7th, North and Walnut Streets; 40°15′52″N 76°53′01″W | Dauphin | Includes the Pennsylvania State Capitol, North and South Office Buildings, Finance Building, Forum Building, State Street Bridge and Ryan Legislative Office Building. Originally listed with only the capitol, expanded in 2013 to encompass surrounding buildings. |
| 75^{#} | Gifford Pinchot House | Gifford Pinchot House | May 23, 1963 (#66000694) | Milford; 41°19′39″N 74°49′15″W | Pike | Home of Gifford Pinchot, first head of the U.S. Forest Service and two-time state governor. |
| 76 | Terence V. Powderly House | Terence V. Powderly House | May 23, 1966 (#66000667) | Scranton; 41°25′06″N 75°40′29″W | Lackawanna | Longtime home of Terence Vincent Powderly, a Knights of Labor leader. |
| 77 | Joseph Priestley House | Joseph Priestley House | January 12, 1965 (#66000673) | Northumberland; 40°53′17″N 76°47′25″W | Northumberland | Stately home of chemist Joseph Priestley, who, disenchanted with England moved here in 1794 and continued his ground-breaking research. |
| 78 | The Printzhof | The Printzhof | November 5, 1961 (#66000661) | Essington; 39°51′33″N 75°18′11″W | Delaware | A home of Johan Printz. |
| 79 | Pulpit Rocks | Pulpit Rocks | November 4, 1993 (#93001614) | Huntingdon; 40°31′09″N 78°02′43″W | Huntingdon | |
| 80 | Matthew S. Quay House | Matthew S. Quay House | May 15, 1975 (#75001615) | Beaver; 40°41′38″N 80°18′12″W | Beaver | A home of Matthew Stanley Quay, a Republican National Chairman who was campaign manager for Benjamin Harrison's successful presidential campaign. |
| 81 | St. Mark's Episcopal Church (Jim Thorpe) | St. Mark's Episcopal Church (Jim Thorpe) | December 23, 1987 (#77001135) | Jim Thorpe; 40°51′47″N 75°44′18″W | Carbon | |
| 82 | Searights Tollhouse, National Road | Searights Tollhouse, National Road | January 29, 1964 (#66000665) | Uniontown; 39°56′43″N 79°47′40″W | Fayette | Tollhouses built in 1835 as part of the National Road. |
| 83 | Schaeffer House | Schaeffer House | July 25, 2011 (#11000630) | Schaefferstown; 40°17′47″N 76°18′01″W | Lebanon | Possibly the only remaining German Weinbauernhaus in America, combining a residence with the production of alcohol. |
| 84 | Smithfield Street Bridge | Smithfield Street Bridge | May 11, 1976 (#74001745) | Pittsburgh; Smithfield Street at the Monongahela River; 40°26′05″N 80°00′08″W | Allegheny | A truss bridge built between 1881 and 1883. |
| 85 | Staple Bend Tunnel | Staple Bend Tunnel | April 19, 1994 (#94001187) | Conemaugh Township; 40°21′26″N 78°51′19″W | Cambria | The first railroad tunnel in the United States. Regarded as an engineering marvel. |
| 86 | Stiegel-Coleman House | Stiegel-Coleman House | November 13, 1966 (#66000668) | Brickerville; 40°14′16″N 76°17′48″W | Lancaster | House built in parts by owner William Stiegel and then by Robert Coleman. |
| 87 | Summerseat | Summerseat | July 17, 1965 (#71000685) | Morrisville; 40°12′27″N 74°46′44″W | Bucks | A home of George Clymer, a signer of the Declaration of Independence and the U.S. Constitution. |
| 88 | George Taylor House | George Taylor House | July 17, 1971 (#71000709) | Catasauqua Lehigh & Poplar Streets; 40°38′45″N 75°27′59″W | Lehigh | A home of George Taylor, a signer of the Declaration of Independence. |
| 89 | Thomas, M. Carey, Library, Bryn Mawr College | Thomas, M. Carey, Library, Bryn Mawr College | July 17, 1991 (#91002052) | Bryn Mawr; 40°01′37″N 75°18′50″W | Montgomery | An architecturally significant building on Bryn Mawr College campus. |
| 90 | Union Canal Tunnel | Union Canal Tunnel | April 19, 1994 (#74001792) | Lebanon Tunnel Hill Road; 40°20′58″N 76°27′42″W | Lebanon | |
| 91^{†} | Valley Forge | Valley Forge | January 20, 1961 (#66000657) | Valley Forge; 40°05′49″N 75°26′20″W | Chester and Montgomery | |
| 92 | Gen. Friedrich Von Steuben Headquarters | Gen. Friedrich Von Steuben Headquarters | November 28, 1972 (#72001108) | Valley Forge National Historical Park; 40°05′49″N 75°28′13″W | Chester | Headquarters of drillmaster Baron Friedrich Wilhelm Ludolf Gerhard Augustin von Steuben who had served Frederick the Great. Now part of Valley Forge National Historical Park. |
| 93 | Washington's Crossing | Washington's Crossing | January 20, 1961 (#66000650) | Yardley, PA and Titusville, NJ; 40°17′51″N 74°52′35″W | Bucks, PA and Mercer County, NJ | Pennsylvania location of George Washington's crossing of the Delaware River leading up to the Battle of Trenton on December 26, 1776, includes Washington Crossing State Park in New Jersey |
| 94 | Washington's Headquarters | Washington's Headquarters | November 28, 1972 (#73001655) | Valley Forge National Historical Park Valley Creek Road, near junction of PA Routes 252 & 23; 40°05′58″N 75°27′43″W | Montgomery | Part of Valley Forge National Historical Park. |
| 95 | Waynesborough | Waynesborough | November 28, 1972 (#73001603) | Paoli; 40°01′55″N 75°28′23″W | Chester | Home of General Anthony Wayne. |
| 96 | Conrad Weiser House | Conrad Weiser House | October 9, 1960 (#66000646) | Womelsdorf; 40°21′33″N 76°10′26″W | Berks | A home of Johann Conrad Weiser, who enlisted the Iroquois on the British side of the French and Indian War. |
| 97 | Benjamin West Birthplace | Benjamin West Birthplace | December 21, 1965 (#66000662) | Swarthmore; 39°54′18″N 75°21′05″W | Delaware | Birthplace of Benjamin West who supported artists including Gilbert Stuart and Charles Willson Peale. On campus of Swarthmore College. |
| 98 | Woodmont | Woodmont | August 5, 1998 (#98001192) | Gladwyne 1622 Spring Mill Road; 40°03′48″N 75°17′29″W | Montgomery | Designed by William Lightfoot Price for industrialist Alan Wood, Jr. Father Divine also lived here. |
| 99 | Woodville | Woodville | July 28, 1983 (#74001733) | Heidelberg; South of Heidelberg on Pennsylvania Route 50; 40°22′47″N 80°05′47″W | Allegheny | Home of John Neville, tax collector during the Whiskey Rebellion of 1794. |
| 100 | Andrew Wyeth Studio and Kuerner Farm | Andrew Wyeth Studio and Kuerner Farm | June 23, 2011 (#11000564) | Chadds Ford Township; 39°52′09″N 75°34′32″W | Delaware | The Kuerner Farm was the inspiration for more than 1,000 Wyeth paintings over a 64-year period. Listing expanded (and renamed) in 2014 to include the studio of Andrew Wyeth. |
| 101 | N. C. Wyeth House and Studio | N. C. Wyeth House and Studio | December 9, 1997 (#97001680) | Chadds Ford Township; 39°51′59″N 75°35′09″W | Delaware | Home and studio of painter N.C. Wyeth and family. Managed by the Brandywine River Museum. |
| 102 | W. A. Young and Sons Foundry and Machine Shop | W. A. Young and Sons Foundry and Machine Shop | December 23, 2016 (#100000839) | Rices Landing; 39°56′59″N 79°59′57″W | Greene | |

== See also ==
- National Register of Historic Places listings in Pennsylvania
- List of National Historic Landmarks by state
- List of National Historic Sites in United States
- List of Pennsylvania state historical markers
- List of National Natural Landmarks in Pennsylvania
