= Patience Stapleton =

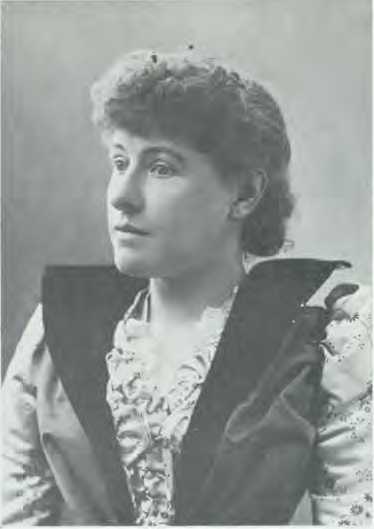
- Born: Martha Armstrong Tucker; March 9, 1861; Wiscasset
- Died: November 25, 1893 (aged 32); New York City
- Occupation: Writer, journalist
- Relatives: Richard Hawley Tucker

Patience Stapleton (9 March 1861 – 25 November 1893) was an American novelist and journalist.

She was born Martha Armstrong Tucker on 9 March 1861 in Wiscasset, Maine, one of six children of Richard Holbrook Tucker, a sea captain, and Mary Geraldine Armstrong Tucker. She grew up in the family home, Castle Tucker, in Wiscasset. Her brother was the astronomer Richard Hawley Tucker.

She was educated at a convent in Whitefield, Maine, a boarding school called The Willows in Farmington, Maine, where she produced her first play at the age of 15, and the Moravian Seminary in Bethlehem, Pennsylvania. After graduating in 1877, she spent a year as a public school teacher in Bethlehem. She published her first short story, "Jim", in The Youth's Companion in 1879.

Patience Stapleton died on 25 November 1893 in New York City, a few days after an operation to remove a tumor.

== Bibliography ==
- The Major's Christmas, and Other Stories. Denver, 1886.
- Kady. Chicago: Belford, Clarke, 1888
- My Sister's Husband. J. W. Lovell, 1889.
- Babe Murphy. Chicago: Belford, Clarke, 1890
- Rose Geranium, A Tragedy. Chicago: Morrill, Higgins, 1892
- My Jean. Chicago: Morrill, Higgins, 1893.
- Trailing Yew: A Story of Monhegan. Boston: Hudson Printing Co., 1921
