= Lewis David de Schweinitz Residence =

Historic house in Pennsylvania, United States

- Gemeinhaus-Lewis David de Schweinitz Residence
- U.S. National Register of Historic Places
- U.S. National Historic Landmark
- U.S. National Historic Landmark District – Contributing property
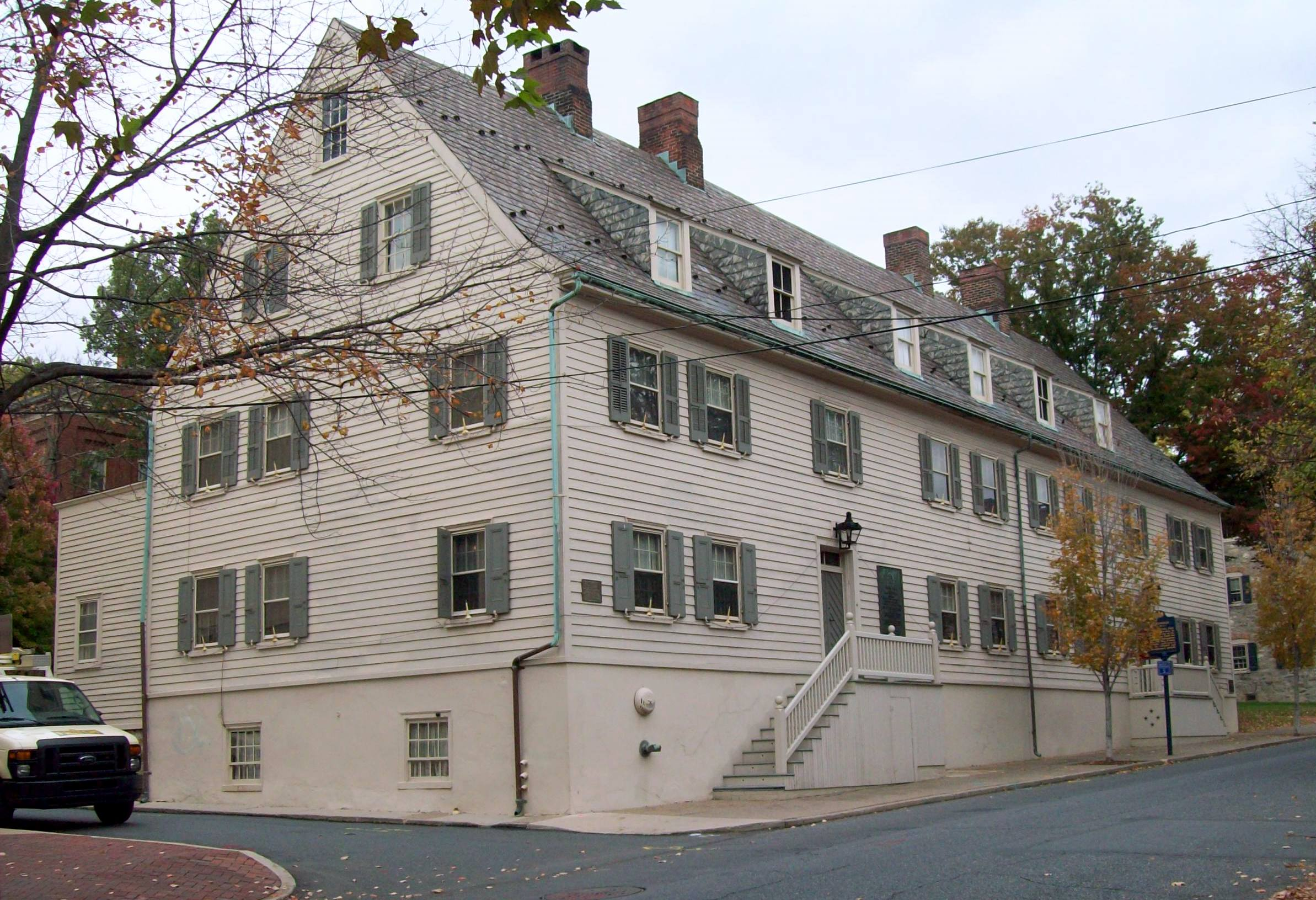
- Gemeinhaus-Lewis David de Schweinitz Residence, October 2011

- Location within Pennsylvania Location within the United States
- Location: 66 W. Church St., Bethlehem, Pennsylvania
- Coordinates: 40°37′7″N 75°22′52″W
- Built: 1741
- Part of: Historic Moravian Bethlehem District (ID12001016)
- NRHP reference No.: 75001658

Significant dates
- Added to NRHP: May 15, 1975
- Designated NHL: May 15, 1975
- Designated NHLDCP: October 6, 2012

The Moravian Museum of Bethlehem, also known as the 1741 Gemeinhaus and the Lewis David de Schweinitz Residence, is a historic house museum at 66 West Church Street in Bethlehem, Pennsylvania. Built in 1741 to house the early Moravian community as well as the community's place of worship, the Saal, it is the oldest surviving building in Bethlehem, the largest surviving log house in continuous use in the U.S. and also significant for its association with the botanist and mycologist Lewis David de Schweinitz (1780–1834). It was declared a National Historic Landmark in 1975. The building is part of the Historic Moravian Bethlehem District which was designated as a National Historic Landmark District in 2012 and later named to the U.S. Tentative List in 2016 for nomination to the World Heritage List.

== Description and history ==
The former Moravian Gemeinhaus (meaning Community House) is located in the historic heart of Bethlehem, at the northeast corner of West Church Street and Heckewelder Place. It is a 2 1/2-story log structure, covered by a gable roof and sheathed in wooden clapboards. The front roof face is pierced by six small shed-roof dormers, and the facade is ten bays wide, divided into two five-bay sections each with a center entrance. Its oldest portion, built in 1741, is the oldest surviving structure in Bethlehem. The building reached its present shape by 1743.

The Gemeinhaus building complex includes some of the oldest buildings in Bethlehem such as: the 1746 Bell House, 1751 Old Chapel, and 1744-1772 Single Sisters’ House. The house was originally built by the Moravian settlers who founded Bethlehem as a home for its entire community (numbering 80 individuals) and later for the married clergy and officers. It served as the location within which they conducted their education, medicine, worship, and home mission work, and served in this role for many years.

In its early years, the Gemeinhaus was the location of communal dining and cooking. The Sisters prepared daily meals in the lower level for the community, soon numbering over 100 people, until a separate kitchen was built within the Bell House. The second floor of the building contained the Saal, the largest room in the building and the earliest place of worship in Bethlehem. It was here that the first funeral occurred for a man named Johannes Mueller (first person to be buried in God's Acre Cemetery) on June 27, 1742. The first wedding in Bethlehem (Johann Zander and Johanna Magdalena Mueller) took place on July 8, 1742, as well as the historic “Great Wedding” where 28 couples were married in the same service by 7 clergy on July 15, 1749. By late 1749 the community had grown too large (over 200 people) and a bigger space was needed. They built their second place of worship in 1751, now called the Old Chapel, as an addition to the Gemeinhaus.

Residency within the Gemeinhaus changed over the years as the population of the community grew. As other buildings were constructed, residents moved into the new choir houses including the Single Brethrens’ House, the Single Sisters’ House, the Bell House, the Widow's House, and later small homes for individual families. By 1761 there were 650 people in the community, and by 1843 there were 865. By 1796 the Gemeinhaus was home to the clergy and their families only and was commonly referred to as “the Clergy House.” By the mid-nineteenth century further homes had been built and the Gemeinhaus was no longer needed as a “Clergy House.” By 1869 only one clergyman remained: the Rev. Peter Ricksecker, a missionary to the West Indies.

Thereafter rooms within the building were rented out by the Trustees of the Moravian Congregation of Bethlehem and it was listed as apartments in the 1920 city directory. In 1923 a circle of the Union of King's Daughters and Sons, an ecumenical organization, established a King's Daughters Home in the Gemeinhaus for the care of elderly women. This lasted until 1964 when the King's Daughters Home moved to a more suitable building. The Gemeinhaus opened as a museum on April 30, 1966.

Music was an important part of worship for the Moravians. The first keyboard instrument, a Knolten spinet, arrived for the Saal from England on January 25, 1744. A pipe organ was later installed in June 1746. They memorized hundreds of hymns and sang them by heart, sometimes in the form of polyglot singing, often in their own native or known languages. At one point in time there were as many as 13 different languages spoken within the community and sung within the Gemeinhaus Saal. Other musical instruments accompanied the singing including horns, brass, and stringed instruments, some of which are on display there today.

The Gemeinhaus was the location of the first medical office in Bethlehem established by Dr. John Adolph Meyer in 1742, whose practice is believed to be the forerunner of the earliest hospital concept in America. Based out of a small room in the Gemeinhaus (a space that is now a restroom) Meyer along with eight male and seven female nurses provided care for the community with innovative medical practices that were well ahead of their time. Meyer later opened Bethlehem's first apothecary in 1743 within the building, which later moved into the Bell House until a laboratory was constructed along present-day Main Street in 1752. The 1752 Apothecary, part of the Moravian Museum of Bethlehem, was the oldest pharmacy in continuous operation in the United States up until its closing in the 1950s.

The first classes in the nation to educate girls in a broad curriculum similar to what boys were taught were instituted in 1742 by Countess Benigna von Zinzendorf. Her classes were held in the Gemeinhaus and even predated the first classes for boys in Bethlehem by a month. The classes for girls were later moved to the Bell House in 1749.

It was here that Lewis David de Schweinitz was born in 1780; his father was a Moravian clergyman, and he also became an official in the church. It was his childhood home until the age of seven, when he was sent away to school at Nazareth, Pennsylvania, and was again his home from 1822 until is death in 1834. While at Nazareth, de Schweinitz cultivated an interest in botany and mycology, interests that he followed when his church duties permitted. He wrote a number of important early papers, including the 1831 "Synopsis of North American Fungi", that were groundbreaking in their depth and organization. At his death he was considered the nation's leading mycologist.

Today the building houses the Moravian Museum of Bethlehem and contains historic artifacts, artwork, furnishings, clothing, instruments, books, tools, and manuscripts that tell the story of Bethlehem's founders. Visitors can learn about early Moravian communal living, missionary work, and their progressive educational system and medicinal practices on guided tours. Among the notable collections one can find original Gustav Grunewald paintings, historic maps and prints of early Bethlehem, the Till Piano, and examples of silver, tin, red and yellow-ware pottery, and clocks made by the early Moravian artisans.

Some other unique items within the museum collection can be found in the Fire Engine Annex. Sitting on display are the two earliest fire engines of Bethlehem: the Perseverance (purchased in 1763) and the Diligence (purchased in 1792). Also on display are historic fire-fighting tools such as fire buckets and helmets, as well as a section of wooden pipe from the original pumped water system of the 1762 Waterworks.

The 1741 Gemeinhaus is presently under the care of the Moravian Museum of Bethlehem which is part of Historic Bethlehem Museums & Sites, a 501(c)3 non-profit organization.

== Gallery ==
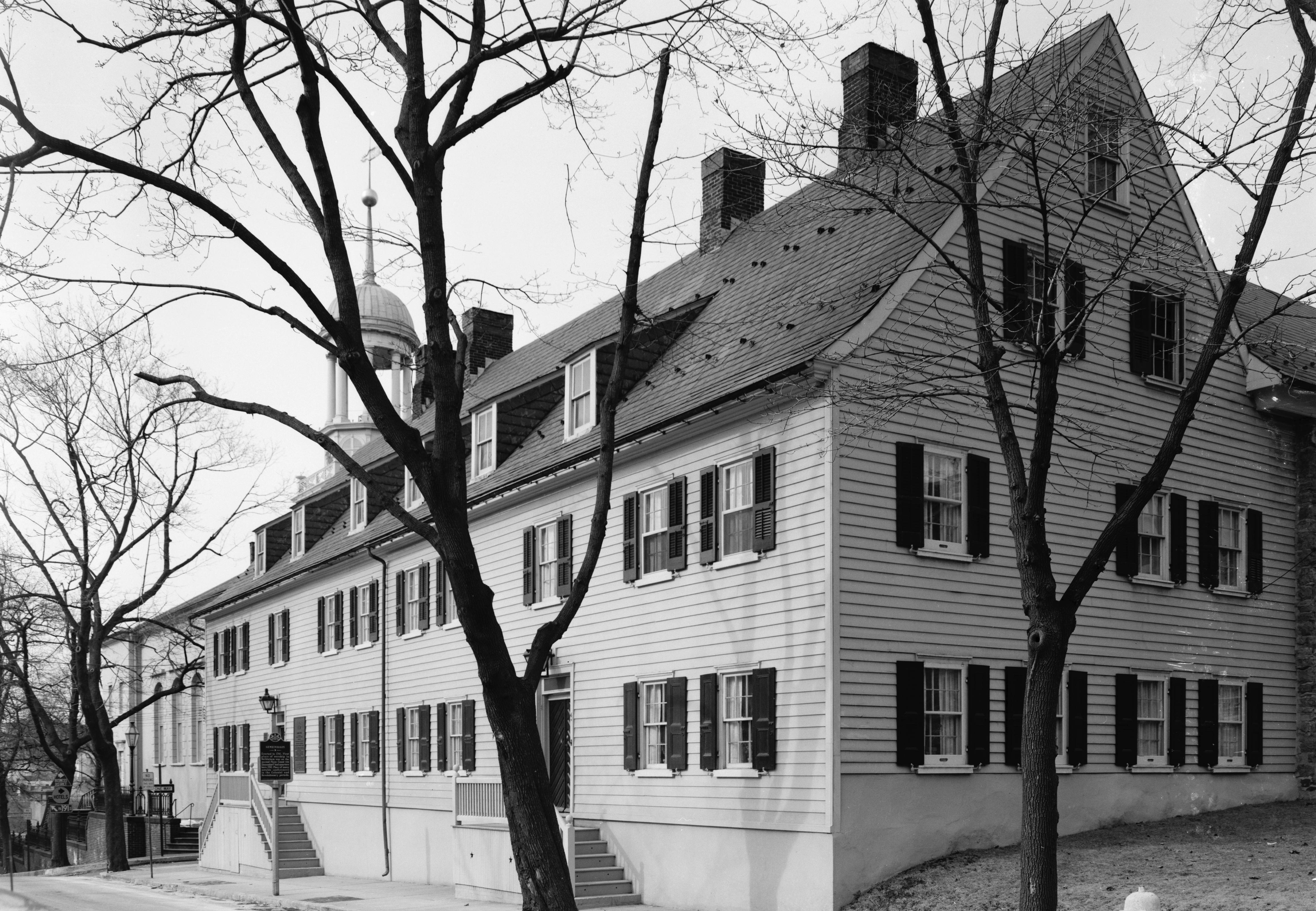
Front of the Gemeinhaus, February 1969

== See also ==
- List of National Historic Landmarks in Pennsylvania
- National Register of Historic Places listings in Northampton County, Pennsylvania
