= Colonial Industrial Quarter =

American industrial park

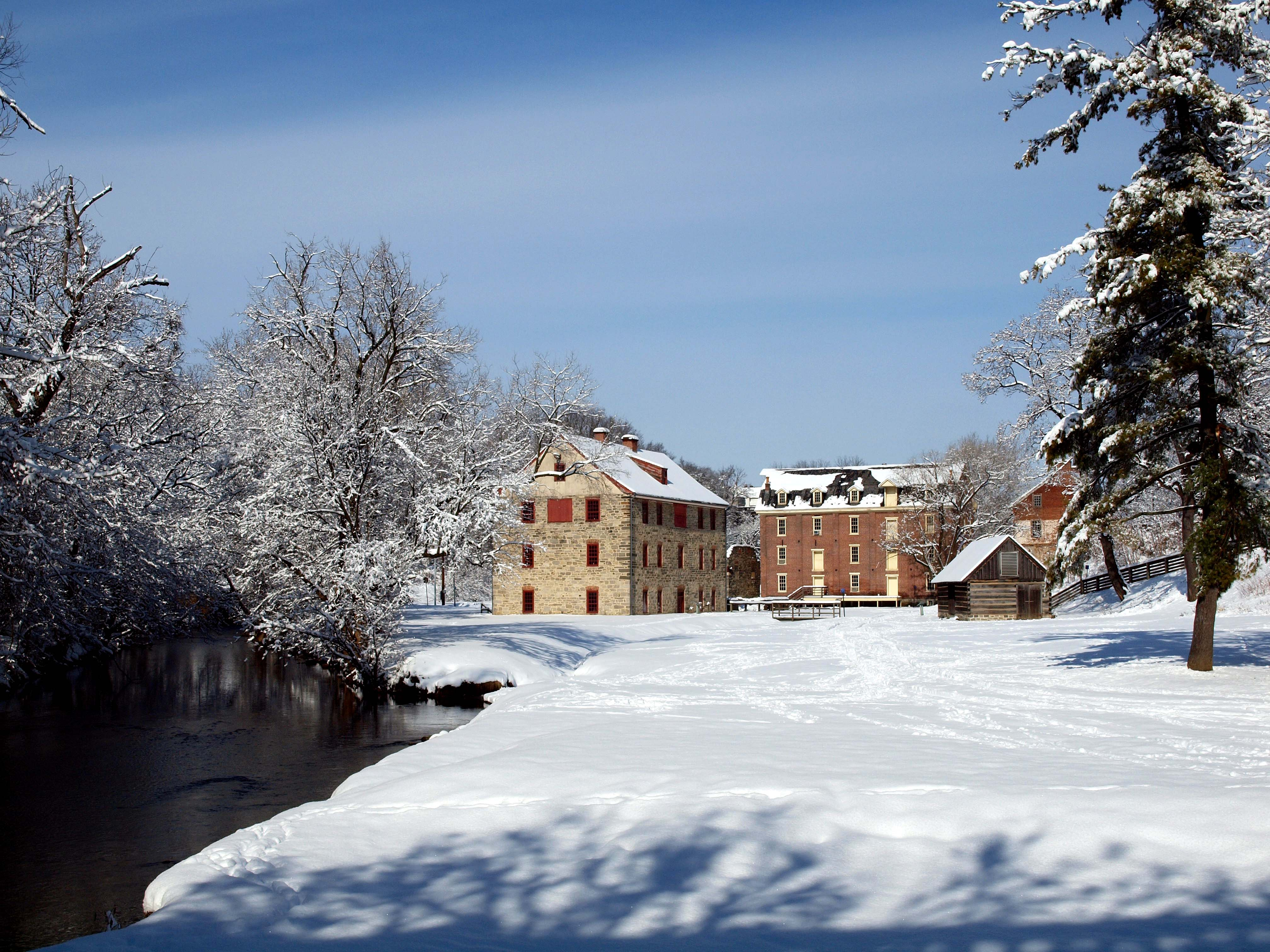
- Snow over Colonial Industrial Quarter in Bethlehem, Pennsylvania along Monocacy Creek, 2014
- Interactive map of Colonial Industrial Quarter
- 40.62049°N 75.38363°W
- Location: Bethlehem, Pennsylvania

History
- Settled: 18th century

Site notes
- Elevation: 236.2 feet (72.0 m)
- Area: 10 acres (4.0 ha)
- Current use: Historic Tours, Education, Events
- Governing body: Local
- Website: HistoricBethlehem.org

The Colonial Industrial Quarter in Bethlehem, Pennsylvania is considered America's earliest industrial park. Established by the colonial Moravians along the banks of the Monocacy Creek, the ten-acre site contains historic buildings such as the 1762 Waterworks (A National Historic Landmark), 1761 Tannery, 1869 Luckenbach Mill, 1748/1834 Gristmiller's House, reconstructed 1764 Springhouse and 1750 Smithy, as well as ruins of the original 1749 Pottery, 1752 Butchery, 1765 Oil Mill, and 1771 Dye House. This location was chosen to take advantage of a spring that supplied potable water and the power supplied by the Monocacy Creek's flow for the craftsmen and trades of early Bethlehem.

The Colonial Industrial Quarter is part of the Historic Moravian Bethlehem District which was designated as a National Historic Landmark District in 2012 and in July 2024 it was inscribed to the World Heritage List. The Colonial Industrial Quarter is also known as the location of several annual events and festivals including the Historic Turkey Trot 5K, Musikfest, and Celtic Classic.

== Description and history ==
“Established in 1741, this area eventually housed thirty-two industries which employed advanced technological methods to produce a variety of products making Bethlehem nearly self-sufficient.”

The first workshops of the Colonial Industrial Quarter were initially built as small log structures. By 1743 the Moravians built a saw mill, soap mill, wash houses, grist mill, oil mill, tannery, blacksmith shop, and brass foundry. By 1747, thirty-five crafts, trades, and industries were established including butchery, tawery, clockmaker, tinsmith, nailor, pewterer, hatter, spinning, weaving, cooper, dye house, community bakery, candlemaker, linen bleachery, fulling mill, saddlery, tailor, cobbler, flax processing, wheelwright, carpenter, and mason. To compensate for a growing community, the log structures were replaced by larger limestone buildings during the late 1740s through the early 1770s. By the mid-1750s the number of trades had grown to approximately 50, making it the largest concentration of industries in the American Colonies of the time.

When John Adams visited this community, he called Bethlehem a “curious and remarkable town” stating to his wife Abigail in a letter (April 1777) that “They have carried the mechanical Arts to greater Perfection here than in any Place which I have seen …They have a fine sett of Mills. The best Grist Mills and bolting Mills, that are anywhere to be found. The best fulling Mills, an oil Mill, a Mill to grind Bark for the Tanyard, a Dying House where All Colours are dyed, Machines for shearing Cloth.”

By the mid-1800s, many of the original 18th century buildings were converted into other uses and some were torn down. By the 1950s, the area had become an automobile junk yard. Civic and cultural interest in the city's history pushed for preservation of the Colonial Industrial Quarter and following a period of urban renewal in the 1960s, the site was cleaned up. This allowed archaeological studies and restoration work to proceed as funds were raised.

The area along the Monocacy Creek was and still is prone to flooding. Damages to the buildings from high water and debris were noted in historic records. The many floods left behind silt and soil which, over the centuries, raised the ground level of the Colonial Industrial Quarter nearly six feet. Most notably the entrance to the Tannery at present day is a few steps below ground level, but back in 1761 it was a few steps above.

The Colonial Industrial Quarter's buildings and ruins are owned by the city of Bethlehem and under long-term lease to Historic Bethlehem Museums & Sites, a 501(c)3 non-profit organization.

== Historic structures and ruins ==
=== The Pottery ruin ===
The Pottery ruin can be found along Main Street, Bethlehem, just west of Central Moravian Church. The building was constructed of limestone in 1749 and measured 32 ft. x 35 ft. with two stories. Historically, it was used as a pottery where the potter made roof tiles for buildings, tile stoves for heating, and plates, cups, bowls, pie plates and other necessities. Later the first floor became the clothmaker and stocking weaver's shop. The second floor became home to thirteen widowers in 1758. The Pottery stood until the early 20th century when it was partially dismantled and converted into brownstone dwellings. A wall fragment and foundations of the original building, which were saved in the 1960s during Urban Renewal, are all that remain today. Yale University Department of Anthropology and Archaeology also conducted a dig at the site.

=== The reconstructed Smithy complex ===
The Smithy complex, located adjacent to the Pottery ruin along Main Street, was constructed in 1750 and later expanded in 1761. The complex consisted of workrooms and forges for the nailsmith, locksmith, blacksmith, tinsmith, gunsmith, and gunstock maker with blacksmithing operations continuing until around 1829. The original Smithy complex was dismantled and converted into brownstone dwellings in the early 20th century. Standing in its place today is a full reconstruction done in 2004 upon the original foundations and based upon various archival resources found within the collections of the Moravian Archives. The reconstruction was crafted using limestone taken from a local 18th century barn being torn down, and includes the original Smithy's vaulted cistern which was still intact. Today the 1750 Smithy interprets a mid 1700s Blacksmith Shop with skilled artisans demonstrating 18th century techniques, open to the public to view and also take blacksmithing classes.

=== Ohio Road ===
Leading down the hill between the Smithy and Pottery ruin is a footpath known as Ohio Road which follows an early American Indian trail and bridge across the Monocacy Creek. The original bridge and road appear on a Plan of Bethlehem dated 1766. The current stone bridge was constructed in the early 1800s and today serves as a pedestrian walkway.

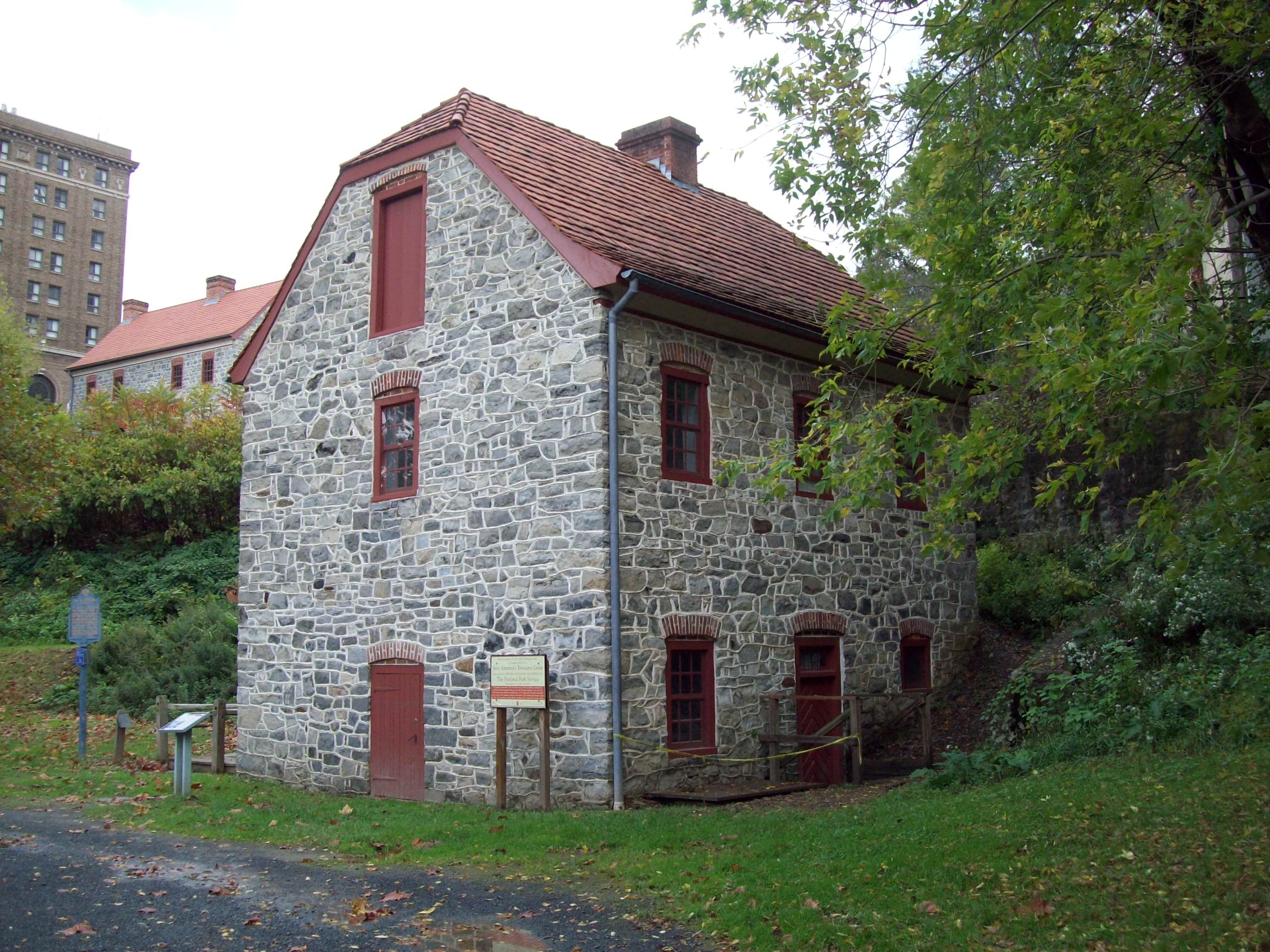
View of the 1762 Waterworks at the Colonial Industrial Quarter in Bethlehem, Pennsylvania.

=== The Waterworks ===
The Waterworks, a National Historic Civil Engineering Landmark (declared 1971), American Water Landmark (declared 1971), and National Historic Landmark (declared 1981), was built in 1762. It is considered to be the first municipal pumped water system in America; an undershot waterwheel powered three pumps and forced spring water to a collecting tower where Central Moravian Church now stands. The water flowed from the tower into five locations on the hillside for use by the community. It stands today essentially unchanged from its original form with the stone structure, wheel pit, and pump area still intact. It underwent restoration in 1972 in which the building, waterwheel, and pumping mechanism were restored using original 18th century master craftsmen's drawings found in the Moravian Archives collection. The waterwheel was later damaged from Hurricane Ivan in 2004 and was repaired in 2009 through funding from a Save America's Treasures Grant. The building's original purpose is interpreted at this site today on guided tours.

=== The Oil Mill ruin ===
The Oil Mill ruin sitting across from the Waterworks represents the Oil Mill building constructed circa 1765, though it was not the first Oil Mill constructed in the Quarter. The first Oil Mill was built in 1745 and was much smaller than the later Oil Mills, with oil seed pressing as its only operation. Early artistic renditions of the original mill suggest it was not a water-powered operation due to a lack of waterwheels in contemporary drawings. It was rebuilt as a log structure in 1752 approximately 200 feet south of the original location. This new mill was the site for various industrial processes and used one undershot waterwheel to process oilseeds, tanbark, and hemp. The 1752 Oil Mill produced 750–1550 gallons (2800–5900 liters) of linseed oil annually. A fire damaged the 1752 Oil Mill beyond repair on November 18, 1763, and a new, larger stone Oil Mill was constructed in 1765 on the location of the present-day ruin. This mill featured two undershot waterwheels with additional machinery for grinding groats. Additional products would be added to the facilities operations such as buckwheat, millet, barley malt, split peas, and tobacco snuff, making it one of the most versatile facilities and profitable industries in 18th century Bethlehem. By the early 1800s, the changing economy in Bethlehem created operational deficits that could not be overcome and the mill's operations came to an end in 1814. For the next hundred years it was used by tenant millers and then as the relocated Waterworks for 81 years. Due to insurmountable water contamination within the spring that caused an outbreak of typhoid and dysentery, it was shut down in 1913. The Oil Mill was demolished in 1934 as a project of the Works Progress Administration with the stones used for retaining walls along the Monocacy Creek. Only the foundations of the Oil Mill remain today.

=== The reconstructed Springhouse ===
The first Springhouse, constructed in 1747, was a small stone structure built over the spring to make use of the water's very cold temperature to provide storage for perishable foodstuffs. Flowing at a rate of one million gallons per day, the spring's water overflow spilled onto large rocks on the earthen floor where the Moravian's placed their dairy products, vegetables, and redware pots full of milk. Each choir house in the community had its own shelf in the building to provide storage for meat, eggs, cheese and butter, fresh fruit and vegetables. In 1764, a larger log structure was erected, and a similar building was later reconstructed in the 1970s. The spring provided water to the city of Bethlehem until the early 1900s when it was capped due to contamination.

=== The Tannery ===
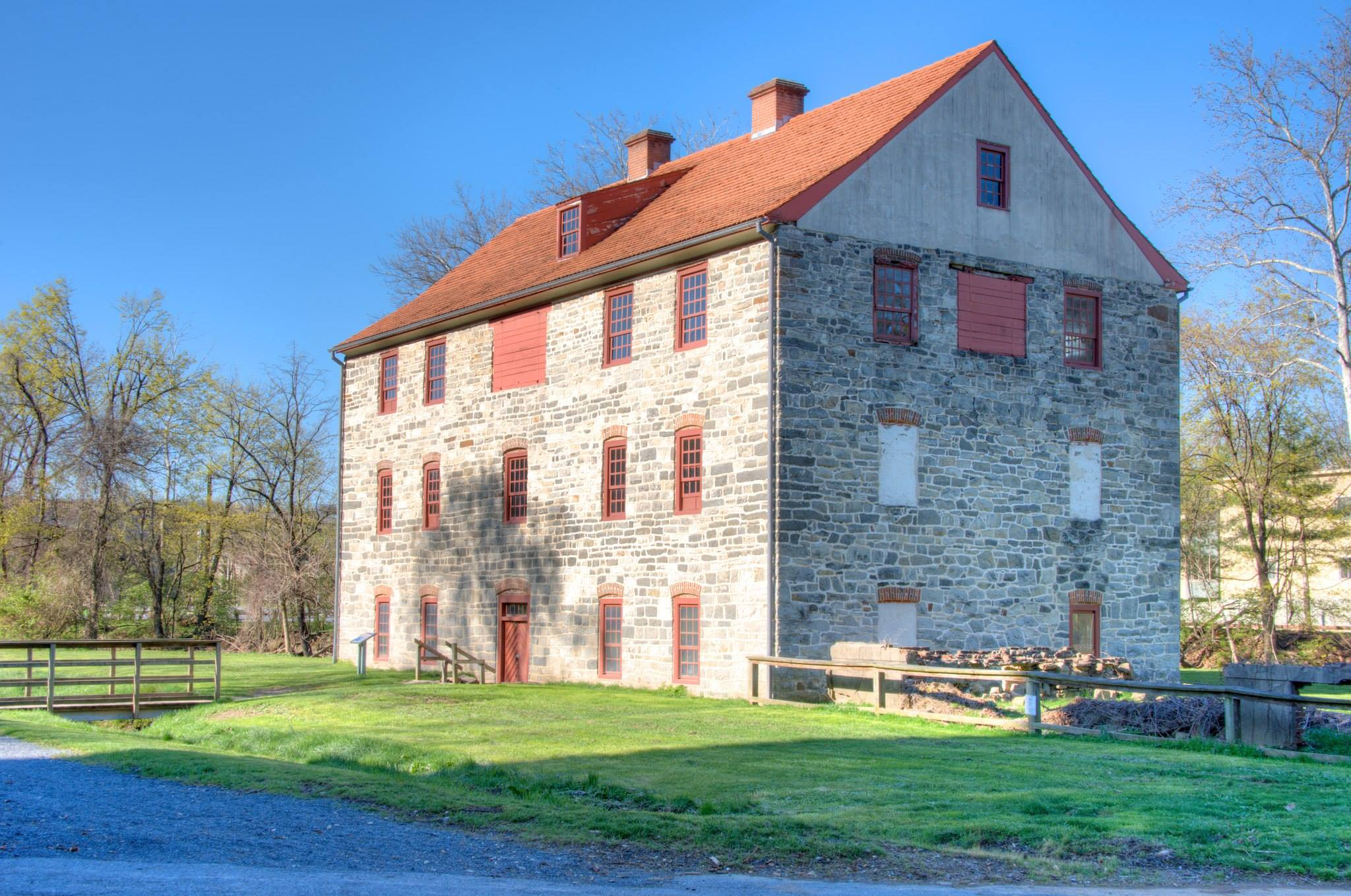
View of Tannery at Colonial Industrial Quarter, Bethlehem, PA

The Tannery was originally built as a small log structure in 1743 along the east side of the Grist Mill (today Luckenbach Mill) tail race. As the community grew, so did the tanning operation, and a larger, more permanent stone structure was built on the west side of the tail race in 1761. Leather was both an important material and a valuable commodity in early Bethlehem, making the need for the tannery all the greater. By the 1760s the colonial Moravians processed 1000–2000 animal hides at the Tannery annually and produced a large variety of leather products such as clothing, shoes, harnesses, and machinery parts. The Tannery was operated by the Moravians until 1829 and tanning ceased in 1873 due to the rising price of tanbark. The building was then used for various operations and eventually deteriorated to the point of becoming a tenement house surrounded by a junk yard. It was restored between 1968 and 1971.

=== The Butchery Ruin ===
The Butchery archaeological ruin represents what is left of the building originally constructed in 1752, with only the foundation walls extant. Illustrations from the 18th century show a two-story building that acted as a slaughter house, providing meat for the community and hides for the Tannery next door. It was converted into a laundry and cleaning business by the early 20th century and was later torn down as part of the Urban Renewal project in the 1960s. Little remains today other than the foundation.

=== The Dye House ruin ===
The Dye House, a limestone building constructed in 1771, stood as a two-story, three-bay building with a one-story section to the west where the dyeing operations occurred. Natural substances such as indigo (blue), madder (red), logwood (purple), and fustic (yellow) were used to dye fabrics such as linen, cotton, and silk. Initially built along the grist mill tail race in 1746, an addition for a second dye house was constructed in 1752 next to the site of the present-day ruins. Operations in the Dye House ceased in the 1830s after which the building was used for storage and dwellings. In the 1930s the house was partially dismantled with the stone being used for the construction of other structures. Today the remaining ruins, consisting of foundation, walls, and window openings, are an archaeological site that was investigated by the Yale University Department of Anthropology and Archaeology.

=== The Grist Mill (Luckenbach Mill) ===
The Grist Mill underwent several building iterations before it became the building known today as the Luckenbach Mill. The original wooden flour mill was built in 1743 and due to flood damage was later replaced by a limestone structure in 1751. This building was destroyed by a fire in 1869 and the building seen today was erected later that year, though portions of the 1751 mill's north and east walls are still visible. The mill remained one of the longest-lasting industries in the Colonial Industrial Quarter, receiving modern upgrades of steam power in 1877, an Allis roller mill system in 1882, and a 25,000 bushel grain elevator in 1893. The Luckenbach Mill was in continuous use well into the 20th century, gradually switching from flour to grain before all milling ceased in 1949. It was purchased in 1952 by an auto parts dealer who turned the whole Colonial Industrial Quarter area into an automobile junkyard. The building was restored in 1982. Presently the structure houses event and educational space as well as the Library and Archives for Historic Bethlehem Museums & Sites.

=== The Grist Miller's House and garden ===
The Grist Miller's House was built in 1784 after the end of Bethlehem's General Economy and was the first individual residence for a master of a trade. The building was made of limestone with one story and a basement as a home for the miller and his family. In 1834 the house was enlarged and it was used as a residence until the 1970s, then used as programming space and offices for Historic Bethlehem Museums & Sites until the late 1990s. It was individually listed on the National Register of Historic Places in 1973. The building is currently awaiting restoration. Outside the Miller's House is the Miller's House Garden, patterned on a Germanic four-square plan from 1870. The garden contains period flora such as vintage roses and herbs and is cared for by the Bethlehem Garden Club.
