= Gristmiller's House =

Historic house in Pennsylvania, United States

- U.S. National Register of Historic Places
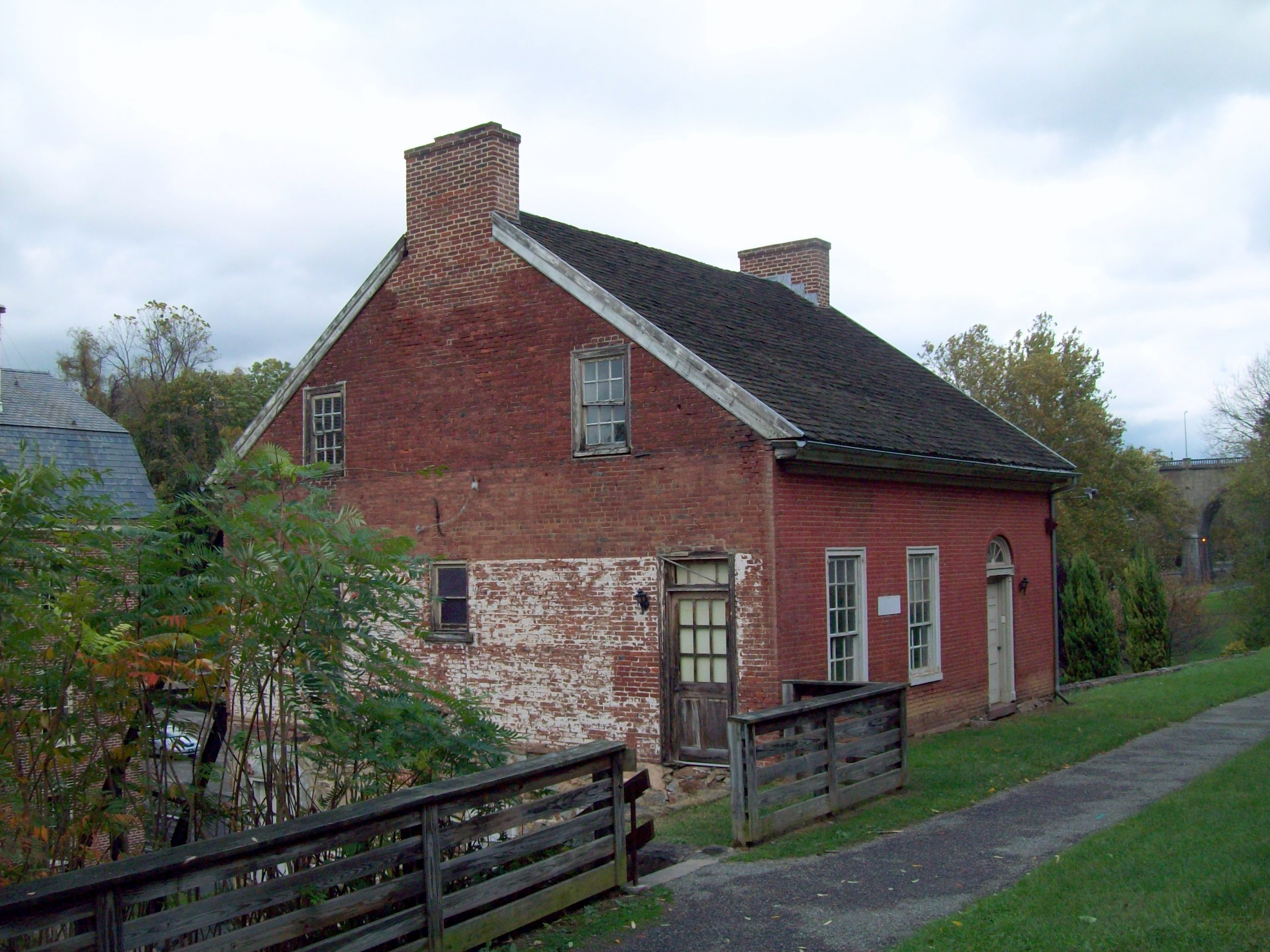
- Gristmiller's House, October 2011

- Location within Pennsylvania Location within the United States
- Location: 459 Old York Rd., Bethlehem, Pennsylvania
- Coordinates: 40°37′15″N 75°23′0″W
- Area: 0 acres (0 ha)
- Built: 1782
- Architectural style: Federal
- NRHP reference No.: 73001657
- Added to NRHP: June 18, 1973

The Gristmiller's House, also known as The Miller's House, is an historic home which is located in Bethlehem, Northampton County, Pennsylvania.

It was added to the National Register of Historic Places in 1973.

== History and architectural features ==
The original building is a one-story limestone structure that was built in 1782. A one-and-one-half-story brick addition in the Federal style was added during the 1830s. It is included as part of the Bethlehem Colonial Industrial Quarter.

== History and description ==
The Miller's House was one of the early private, family homes and the first separate residence for the master of a trade constructed after the end of Bethlehem's General Economy in the 1760s. Situated adjacent to the Luckenbach Mill, which was erected in 1869, the home allowed the miller to live close to the mill, where he was responsible for grinding grain into flour. It served as a home until the 1970s and currently awaits restoration.

The Gristmiller's House is presently under the care of Historic Bethlehem Museums & Sites, a 501(c)3 non-profit organization.

While the building is not currently open to the public, visitors can enjoy the Miller's House Garden, planted on a Germanic four-square pattern from 1870. The garden includes native plants such as a variety of vintage roses and herbs, and is maintained by the Bethlehem Garden Club.

== Gallery ==
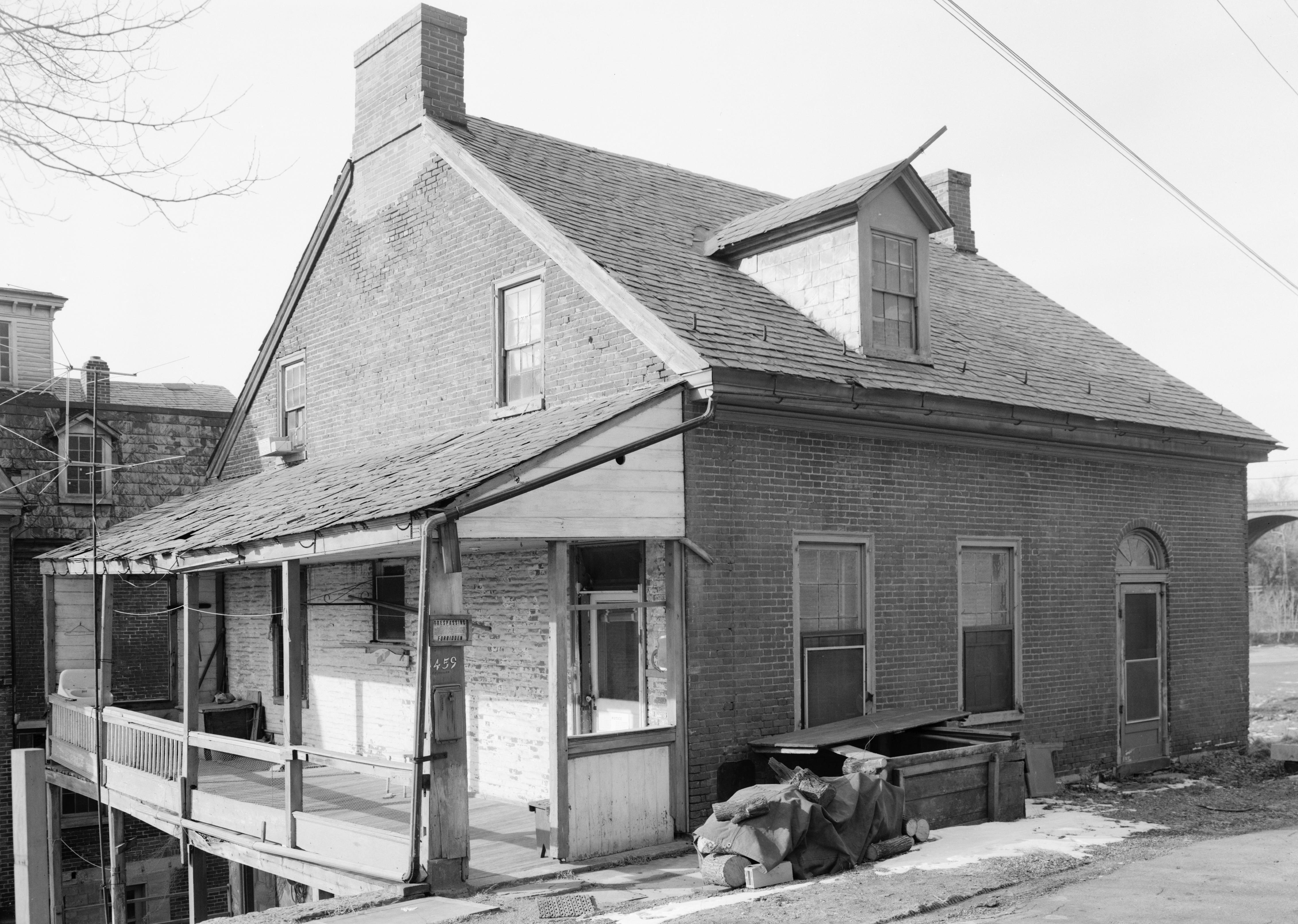
Gristmiller's House, February 1969
