= National Register of Historic Places listings in Northampton County, Pennsylvania =

Location of Northampton County in Pennsylvania

This is a list of the National Register of Historic Places listings in Northampton County, Pennsylvania.

This is intended to be a complete list of the properties and districts on the National Register of Historic Places in Northampton County, Pennsylvania, United States.

There are 67 properties and districts listed on the National Register in the county, including 4 sites designated as National Historic Landmarks.

This National Park Service list is complete through NPS recent listings posted October 16, 2026.

== Current listings ==
	Name on the Register	Image	Date listed	Location	Municipality	Description
1	Jacob Arndt House and Barn	Jacob Arndt House and Barn	December 28, 2005 (#05001489)	910 Raubsville Road; 40°37′35″N 75°13′22″W	Williams Township	
2	Bangor Historic District	Bangor Historic District	August 6, 2014 (#14000469)	Roughly bounded by 3rd, Fairview & Pennsylvania Aves., Division, N. 4th, N. Main, Erdman, Northampton, S. 1st Sts. 40°51′57″N 75°12′19″W	Bangor Borough	
3	Bath Crossroads Historic District	Bath Crossroads Historic District	February 12, 2024 (#100009916)	Roughly 12 blocks centered around Chestnut and Main streets 40°43′33″N 75°23′39″W	Bath	
4	Bethlehem Silk Mill	Bethlehem Silk Mill	February 15, 2005 (#05000065)	238 West Goepp Street; 40°37′37″N 75°23′05″W	Bethlehem	
5	Bethlehem Steel Lehigh Plant Mill No. 2 Annex	Bethlehem Steel Lehigh Plant Mill No. 2 Annex	May 5, 2004 (#04000401)	11 West 2nd Street; 40°36′55″N 75°22′46″W	Bethlehem	
6	Bridge in Bangor Borough	Bridge in Bangor Borough	June 22, 1988 (#88000876)	Pennsylvania Street over Martins Creek; 40°52′10″N 75°12′28″W	Bangor	
7	Bridge in Williams Township	Bridge in Williams Township	June 22, 1988 (#88000855)	Legislative Route 48007 over Frey's Run near Stouts; 40°36′39″N 75°13′54″W	Williams Township	
8	Carbon County Section of the Lehigh Canal	Carbon County Section of the Lehigh Canal	August 10, 1979 (#79002179)	Along the Lehigh River; 40°49′03″N 75°40′08″W	Lehigh Township and Walnutport	Extends into Carbon County
9	Central Bethlehem Historic District	Central Bethlehem Historic District	May 5, 1972 (#72001131)	Bounded by Main, Nevada, and East Broad Streets, and the Lehigh River; also roughly bounded by Walnut St., Linden St., Lehigh River, and New St. 40°37′06″N 75°22′56″W	Bethlehem	Second set of boundaries represents a boundary increase of November 7, 1988. Extends into Lehigh County
10	Chain Bridge	Chain Bridge	February 12, 1974 (#74001798)	Southwest of Glendon on Hugh Moore Parkway across the Lehigh River; 40°39′14″N 75°14′56″W	Palmer Township and Williams Township	
11	Coffeetown Grist Mill	Coffeetown Grist Mill	November 16, 1977 (#77001179)	7 miles (11 km) south of Easton at Coffeetown and Kressman Roads; 40°37′10″N 75°12′21″W	Williams Township	
12	College Hill Residential Historic District	College Hill Residential Historic District	May 1, 1991 (#91000506)	Roughly bounded by McCartney Street, Pierce Street, Pardee Street, the Forks Township line and the Delaware River; 40°42′17″N 75°12′17″W	Easton	
13	County Bridge No. 36	County Bridge No. 36	June 22, 1988 (#88000877)	Township Road 611 over Jacoby Creek; 40°55′07″N 75°05′37″W	Portland	
14	Delaware Division of the Pennsylvania Canal	Delaware Division of the Pennsylvania Canal	October 29, 1974 (#74001756)	Parallels west bank of the Delaware River from Easton to Bristol; 40°41′17″N 75°12′18″W	Easton	Known as the Delaware Canal, extends into Bucks County
15	Dixie Cup Company Complex		February 26, 2026 (#100012752)	330 S. 24th Street; 40°41′03″N 75°14′47″W	Wilson Borough	
16	Easton Cemetery	Easton Cemetery	October 25, 1990 (#90001610)	401 North Seventh Street; 40°41′55″N 75°13′07″W	Easton	
17	Easton Historic District	Easton Historic District	May 6, 1983 (#83002264)	Roughly bounded by Riverside and Bushkill Drives, Ferry and 7th Streets; 40°41′27″N 75°12′43″W	Easton	
18	Easton House	Easton House	December 3, 1980 (#80003583)	167–169 Northampton Street; 40°41′29″N 75°12′29″W	Easton	
19	Edelman Schoolhouse	Edelman Schoolhouse	March 22, 2019 (#100003520)	165 Longley Rd. 40°45′02″N 75°22′03″W	Moore Township	
20	Ehrhart's Mill Historic District	Ehrhart's Mill Historic District	April 30, 1987 (#87000666)	Old Mill Road; 40°33′43″N 75°20′58″W	Lower Saucon Township	
21	Elmwood Park Historic District	Elmwood Park Historic District	April 21, 1988 (#88000449)	Roughly bounded by Goepp Circle, Woodruff Street, Park Place, and Carson Street; 40°37′28″N 75°21′56″W	Bethlehem	
22	Fountain Hill Historic District	Fountain Hill Historic District	April 21, 1988 (#88000450)	Roughly bounded by Brighton, Wyandotte, West Fourth and Seminole Streets, and Delaware Avenue; 40°36′40″N 75°23′10″W	Bethlehem	Extends into Lehigh County
23	Gemeinhaus-Lewis David De Schweinitz Residence	Gemeinhaus-Lewis David De Schweinitz Residence	May 15, 1975 (#75001658)	66 West Church Street; 40°37′07″N 75°22′52″W	Bethlehem	
24	Gosztonyi Savings and Trust	Gosztonyi Savings and Trust	May 19, 2015 (#15000242)	530 E. 3rd St. 40°36′44″N 75°22′15″W	Bethlehem	
25	Gristmiller's House	Gristmiller's House	June 18, 1973 (#73001657)	459 Old York Road; 40°37′15″N 75°23′00″W	Bethlehem	
26	Michael and Margaret Heller House	Michael and Margaret Heller House	June 28, 2010 (#10000399)	1890-1892 Friedensville Rd. 40°34′44″N 75°20′49″W	Lower Saucon Township	
27	William Jacob Heller House	William Jacob Heller House	April 20, 1982 (#82003803)	501 Mixsell Street; 40°42′14″N 75°12′05″W	Easton	
28	Heller-Wagner Grist Mill (Hellertown)		August 15, 2025 (#100012126)	150 W. Walnut St. 40°34′20″N 75°20′37″W	Hellertown	
29	Historic Moravian Bethlehem District	Historic Moravian Bethlehem District	October 16, 2012 (#12001016)	Church, Market and Main Streets; 40°37′08″N 75°22′51″W	Bethlehem	
30	Illick's Mill	Illick's Mill	May 20, 2005 (#05000450)	130 Illick's Mill Road; 40°38′30″N 75°22′51″W	Bethlehem	
31	Jacobsburg Historic District	Jacobsburg Historic District	October 17, 1977 (#77001181)	3 miles (4.8 km) northeast of Nazareth off Pennsylvania Route 115; 40°46′57″N 75°17′34″W	Nazareth	
32	Kreidersville Covered Bridge	Kreidersville Covered Bridge	December 1, 1980 (#80003587)	North of Northampton on Legislative Route 48061; 40°43′25″N 75°29′35″W	Allen Township	
33	R. K. Laros Silk Mill	R. K. Laros Silk Mill	November 24, 2020 (#100005292)	601-699 East Broad St. 40°37′20″N 75°21′46″W	Bethlehem	
34	Lehigh Canal	Lehigh Canal	October 2, 1978 (#78002439)	Lehigh Gap to south Walnutport boundary 40°44′49″N 75°36′18″W	Lehigh Township and Walnutport	
35	Lehigh Canal: Eastern Section Glendon and Abbott Street Industrial Sites	Lehigh Canal: Eastern Section Glendon and Abbott Street Industrial Sites	October 2, 1978 (#78002437)	Lehigh River from Hopeville to confluence of Lehigh and Delaware Rivers; 40°39′24″N 75°17′41″W	Easton	Extends into Lehigh County
36	Lehigh Canal: Allentown to Hopeville Section	Lehigh Canal: Allentown to Hopeville Section	December 17, 1979 (#79002307)	Along Lehigh River; 40°36′55″N 75°24′52″W	Bethlehem	
37	Lehigh Water Gap Chain Bridge Toll House and East Bridge Abutment	Lehigh Water Gap Chain Bridge Toll House and East Bridge Abutment	August 20, 2021 (#100006837)	1309 Riverview Dr. 40°46′56″N 75°36′18″W	Lehigh Township	
38	Lehigh Valley Railroad Headquarters Building	Lehigh Valley Railroad Headquarters Building	May 24, 1984 (#84003517)	425 Brighton Street; 40°36′48″N 75°23′07″W	Bethlehem	
39	Lehigh Valley Silk Mills	Lehigh Valley Silk Mills	April 29, 1993 (#93000356)	Junction of Seneca and Clewell Streets; 40°36′16″N 75°23′37″W	Fountain Hill	
40	Lutz-Franklin School	Lutz-Franklin School	December 30, 2008 (#08001268)	4216 Countryside Lane; 40°37′28″N 75°16′49″W	Lower Saucon Township	
41	C. F. Martin & Company	C. F. Martin & Company	September 4, 2018 (#100002837)	10 W North & 201 N Main Sts. 40°44′45″N 75°18′44″W	Nazareth	
42	Mary Immaculate Seminary (MIS)	Mary Immaculate Seminary (MIS)	April 11, 2022 (#100007566)	300 Cherryville Rd. 40°44′08″N 75°31′20″W	Northampton	
43	McCollum and Post Silk Mill	McCollum and Post Silk Mill	July 27, 2005 (#05000758)	368 Madison Avenue; 40°44′21″N 75°19′08″W	Nazareth	
44	Jacob Mixsell House	Jacob Mixsell House	February 14, 1980 (#80003584)	101 South 4th Street; 40°40′50″N 75°12′37″W	Easton	
45	Moravian Sun Inn	Moravian Sun Inn	October 2, 1973 (#73001658)	564 Main Street; 40°37′19″N 75°22′54″W	Bethlehem	
46	Nazareth Hall Tract	Nazareth Hall Tract	November 28, 1980 (#80003588)	Zinzendorf Square; 40°44′40″N 75°18′54″W	Nazareth	
47	Nazareth Historic District	Nazareth Historic District	August 11, 1988 (#88001203)	Centered on Center and Main Streets; 40°44′31″N 75°18′39″W	Nazareth	
48	Jacob Nicholas House	Jacob Nicholas House	November 21, 1976 (#76001658)	458 Ferry Street; 40°41′22″N 75°12′47″W	Easton	
49	Northampton County Bridge No. 15	Northampton County Bridge No. 15	August 31, 2020 (#100005519)	Meadows Road west of PA 412/Leithsville Rd. and the Saucon Rail Trail; 40°33′57″N 75°20′32″W	Lower Saucon Township	
50	Old Waterworks	Old Waterworks	June 19, 1972 (#72001142)	Within Historic Subdistrict A near Monocacy Creek; 40°37′09″N 75°23′00″W	Bethlehem	
51	Packer Memorial Chapel	Packer Memorial Chapel	November 20, 1979 (#79003234)	Packer Avenue, Lehigh University; 40°36′27″N 75°22′41″W	Bethlehem	
52	Parsons-Taylor House	Parsons-Taylor House	August 22, 1980 (#80003585)	4th and Ferry Streets; 40°41′23″N 75°12′38″W	Easton	
53	Pembroke Village Historic District	Pembroke Village Historic District	May 9, 1988 (#88000464)	Roughly bounded by Radclyffe Street, Carlisle Street, Stefko Boulevard, Arcadia Street and Minsi Trail; 40°37′52″N 75°21′35″W	Bethlehem	
54	Real Estate Building	Real Estate Building	February 20, 1986 (#86000319)	2–8 North Main Street; 40°52′01″N 75°12′20″W	Bangor	
55	Seipsville Hotel	Seipsville Hotel	May 6, 1977 (#77001178)	2912 Old Nazareth Road; 40°41′37″N 75°15′45″W	Palmer Township	
56	R. and H. Simon Silk Mill	R. and H. Simon Silk Mill	December 30, 2014 (#14001104)	659 N. 13th St. 40°41′52″N 75°13′42″W	Easton	
57	Herman Simon House	Herman Simon House	June 27, 1980 (#80003586)	41 North 3rd Street; 40°39′24″N 75°12′34″W	Easton	
58	South Bethlehem Downtown Historic District	South Bethlehem Downtown Historic District	January 3, 2006 (#05001500)	Roughly bounded by Wyandotte, Columbia, Hayes, and Morton Street; 40°36′45″N 75°22′30″W	Bethlehem	
59	State Theatre	State Theatre	March 4, 1982 (#82003804)	454 Northampton Street; 40°41′29″N 75°12′45″W	Easton	
60	Daniel Steckel House	Daniel Steckel House	March 8, 1982 (#82003802)	207 West Northampton Street; 40°43′38″N 75°23′40″W	Bath	
61	Isaac Stout House	Isaac Stout House	August 11, 2004 (#04000834)	50 Durham Road; 40°36′37″N 75°13′59″W	Williams Township	
62	The Tannery	The Tannery	June 19, 1972 (#72001143)	Within Bethlehem Historic Subdistrict A near Monocacy Creek; 40°37′11″N 75°23′02″W	Bethlehem	
63	John Wagner and Family Farmstead	John Wagner and Family Farmstead	July 23, 2020 (#100005357)	1789 Meadows Rd. 40°34′07″N 75°20′50″W	Lower Saucon Township	
64	Walnut Street Bridge	Walnut Street Bridge	May 8, 2023 (#100008901)	200 feet (61 m) west of the intersection of Walnut St. and the Saucon Valley Rail Tr. 40°34′20″N 75°20′41″W	Hellertown	
65	Weona Park Carousel	Weona Park Carousel	August 4, 1999 (#99000879)	Pennsylvania Route 512; 40°52′15″N 75°14′55″W	Pen Argyl	
66	Whitefield House and Gray Cottage	Whitefield House and Gray Cottage	May 1, 1980 (#80003589)	214 East Center Street; 40°44′28″N 75°18′28″W	Nazareth	
67	Zeta Psi Fraternity House	Zeta Psi Fraternity House	May 21, 2001 (#01000506)	49 South College Drive; 40°41′51″N 75°12′28″W	Easton	

== Former listing ==
	Name on the Register	Image	Date listed	Date removed	Location	Municipality	Description
1	Fountain Hill Opera House	Fountain Hill Opera House	June 7, 1979 (#79002306)	August 11, 1987	405 Wyandotte Street	Bethlehem	Destroyed by arsonist on August 13, 1983.

== See also ==
- List of National Historic Landmarks in Pennsylvania
- List of Pennsylvania state historical markers in Northampton County
- National Register of Historic Places listings in Pennsylvania
