= List of Pennsylvania state historical markers in Northampton County =

Location of Northampton County in Pennsylvania

This is a list of the Pennsylvania state historical markers in Northampton County.

This is intended to be a complete list of the official state historical markers placed in Northampton County, Pennsylvania by the Pennsylvania Historical and Museum Commission (PHMC). The locations of the historical markers, as well as the latitude and longitude coordinates as provided by the PHMC's database, are included below when available. There are 74 historical markers located in Northampton County.

== Historical markers ==
Marker title	Image	Date dedicated	Location	Marker type	Topics
1910 Bethlehem Steel Strike		September 1, 2012	Pierce & E 3rd Sts., Bethlehem 40.61215°N 75.37055°W	City	Government & Politics 20th Century, Iron & Steel, Labor
Bell House		October 13, 1953	56 W. Church St., Bethlehem; 40.61882°N 75.38067°W	City	Education, Houses & Homesteads
Bethlehem		July 26, 1948	Pa. 412 entering city from S (Missing)	Roadside	Canals, Cities & Towns, French & Indian War, Native American, Religion, Steel, Transportation
Bethlehem		July 26, 1948	U.S. 22 East of City (Missing)	Roadside	Business & Industry, Canals, Cities & Towns, Music & Theater, Native American, Religion, Steel
Bethlehem		July 26, 1948	U.S. 22 West of City (Missing)	Roadside	Canals, Cities & Towns, Music & Theater, Native American, Religion, Steel
Bethlehem Steel Plant		September 18, 2014	E 3rd & Filmore Sts., at Main Gate, Bethlehem 40.61222°N 75.37194°W	Roadside	Business & Industry, Iron & Steel, Military, Railroads
Brethren's House		September 2, 1964	W. Church St. at site, Bethlehem; 40.61878°N 75.38207°W	City	Business & Industry, Education, Houses & Homesteads, Religion
Catherine Drinker Bowen		April 4, 1997	W. Packer Ave. near Brodhead Ave., Bethlehem	City	Women, Writers
Charles M. Schwab (1862-1939)		September 18, 2007	557 W 3rd St., Bethlehem; 40.6114°N 75.3881°W	City	Business & Industry, Military, Professions & Vocations, Steel
Christian Frederick Martin		August 2, 2000	10 West North St., Nazareth; 40.746°N 75.31248°W	Roadside	Business & Industry, Entrepreneurs, Ethnic & Immigration, Invention, Music & Theater
Crown Inn		June 21, 1954	Riverside Dr. just SE of Lehigh River bridge (Pa. 378), Bethlehem	City	Buildings, Business & Industry, Inns & Taverns
David Brainerd		August 5, 1947	Pa. 611 S of Martins Creek, Easton; 40.77412°N 75.17736°W	Roadside	Native American, Religion
David Martin's Ferry		July 20, 1953	Front & Ferry Sts., Easton; 40.68982°N 75.2052°W	City	American Revolution, Military, Transportation
David Tannenberg (1728–1804)		September 23, 2006	1461 Schoenersville Rd., at entrance to Burnside Plantation, Bethlehem; 40.63313°N 75.38848°W	Roadside	Ethnic & Immigration, Music & Theater, Professions & Vocations, Religion
Delaware Canal		April 12, 1949	Pa. 611 S of Raubsville; 40.627°N 75.191°W	Roadside	Canals, Navigation, Transportation
Dr. Florence Siebert		November 15, 1993	73 N 2nd St., Easton; 40.69292°N 75.20723°W	City	Invention, Medicine & Science, Professions & Vocations, Women
Easton		August 4, 1947	U.S. 611 S of Easton (Missing)	Roadside	Business & Industry, Cities & Towns, Education, Government & Politics, Native American, Transportation
Easton		August 4, 1947	U.S. 22 at 13th St. (Missing)	Roadside	Business & Industry, Cities & Towns, Education, Government & Politics, Native American, Transportation
Easton		August 4, 1947	Pa. 115 N at city line	Roadside	Business & Industry, Cities & Towns, Education, Government & Politics, Native American, Transportation
Easton		August 4, 1947	U.S. 611 N at city line 40.7134°N 75.19582°W	Roadside	Business & Industry, Cities & Towns, Education, Government & Politics 18th Century, Native American, Transportation
Edward Marshall		August 2, 1948	Corner Hester St. & Delaware Ave., Portland; 40.92155°N 75.09573°W	Roadside	Government & Politics, Government & Politics 18th Century, Native American
Edwin L. Drake		October 21, 1959	331 Wyandotte St. (Pa. 378), Bethlehem; 40.6106°N 75.3843°W	City	Business & Industry, Entrepreneurs, Oil & Gas
Eugene Grace		April 19, 1997	114 W. 4th St., Bethlehem; 40.61028°N 75.3805°W	City	Business & Industry, Military, Professions & Vocations, Steel
Famous Indian Walk (The) - PLAQUE		September 1925	Junction of Indian Trail Rd. (SR 3016) and Kohls Rd., at Hokendauqua Creek, .25 mile NW of Kreidersville	Plaque	Government & Politics 18th Century, Native American, William Penn
First House of Moravian Settlement - PLAQUE		May 1, 1929	Wall of Hotel Bethlehem, 437 Main St., Bethlehem; 40.6199°N 75.38223°W	Plaque	Early Settlement, Houses & Homesteads, Religion
First Reformed Church		July 20, 1953	N. 3rd St. at church, Easton; 40.6922°N 75.20918°W	City	American Revolution, Buildings, Government & Politics 18th Century, Medicine & Science, Native American, Religion
Gemein Haus - PLAQUE		April 1931	On front of Gemeinhaus, 66 W. Church St., Bethlehem; 40.6188°N 75.381°W	Plaque	Early Settlement, Houses & Homesteads, Native American, Religion
Gemeinhaus		October 13, 1953	66 W. Church St., Bethlehem; 40.6188°N 75.381°W	City	Government & Politics 18th Century, Religion
George Taylor		July 20, 1953	NE corner of 4th & Ferry Sts., Easton; 40.68978°N 75.21098°W	City	Government & Politics, Government & Politics 18th Century
George Wolf		August 6, 1947	Pa. 329 SW of Bath; 40.70498°N 75.41453°W	Roadside	Education, Government & Politics, Government & Politics 19th Century, Governors
Heckewelder House		October 13, 1953	67 W. Market St., Bethlehem; 40.6206°N 75.3812°W	City	Houses & Homesteads, Native American, Religion, Writers
Henry Noll		October 20, 1995	E 3rd St. E of Fillmore St., Bethlehem; 40.61213°N 75.37278°W	City	Business & Industry, Iron, Professions & Vocations, Steel
Henry's Gun Factory		January 8, 1974	SR 1005 (former Pa. 115), Belfast; 40.78015°N 75.2783°W	Roadside	Buildings, Business & Industry, Military, War of 1812
Hilda Doolittle (H.D.)		September 10, 1982	10 E. Church St., City Center Plaza, Bethlehem; 40.6206°N 75.3778°W	City	Women, Writers
Hockendauqua - PLAQUE		September 1, 1925	PA 329 at eastern approach to Hokendauqua Creek bridge, .5 mile E of Northampton; 40.69435°N 75.49095°W	Plaque	Cities & Towns, Native American, William Penn
Indian Peace Councils		July 20, 1953	NE part of square, Easton (Missing)	City	Government & Politics 18th Century, Native American
John Frederick Wolle (1863-1933)		May 8, 1969	85-87 W. Church St. on Moravian College campus, Bethlehem; 40.61878°N 75.38185°W	City	Music & Theater
John Fritz		June 6, 1992	E. Packer Ave. at the Fritz Engineering Laboratory, Bethlehem	City	Business & Industry, Invention, Iron, Medicine & Science, Professions & Vocations
Lafayette		May 16, 1987	534 Main St., Bethlehem; 40.6213°N 75.3819°W	City	American Revolution, Military
Lafayette College Founding		September 6, 2007	NE corner of center square, Easton	Roadside	American Revolution, Education
Lehigh Canal		October 21, 1995	Hugh Moore State Park, PA 611, Easton; 40.66257°N 75.23837°W	Roadside	Business & Industry, Canals, Coal, Iron, Navigation, Transportation
Lehigh-Lafayette Football Game		November 21, 2015	Lafayette College quad in front of Kirby House, Easton 40.69889°N 75.20778°W	City	Football, Sports & Recreation
Lehigh-Lafayette Football Game		November 21, 2015	Lehigh Univ. at Rauch Bus. Ctr., Packer Ave. & Taylor St., Bethlehem 40.60782°N 75.37391°W	City	Football, Sports & Recreation
Lehigh University		December 1, 1965	Off Pa. 412 in Bethlehem, W. Packer Ave. at Broadhead Ave. (Missing)	Roadside	Education, Medicine & Science
Moravian Archives		October 13, 1953	41 W Locust St., Bethlehem, at Archives Bldg.	City	Buildings, Early Settlement, Education, Native American, Religion
Moravian Cemetery		October 13, 1953	W. Market St. at cemetery, Bethlehem; 40.62062°N 75.37988°W	City	Ethnic & Immigration, Religion
Moravian Community		October 13, 1953	Main St. at Church, Bethlehem; 40.61918°N 75.382°W	City	Early Settlement, Religion
Moses Tunda Tatamy		May 14, 1992	8th & Main Sts., Tatamy	Roadside	Native American
Nazareth		November 18, 1966	Pa. 191 (E. Center St.) opposite N. Pine St. at Whitefield House, Nazareth; 40.74247°N 75.30683°W	Roadside	Cities & Towns, Early Settlement, Native American, Religion
Northampton County		July 8, 1982	Canal Museum, Hugh Moore Park, Pa. 611, Easton; 40.68768°N 75.20578°W	City	Business & Industry, Government & Politics, Government & Politics 18th Century, Steel
Old Chapel		October 13, 1953	Heckewelder Pl. near W Church St., at site, Bethlehem; 40.61917°N 75.3812°W	City	American Revolution, Buildings, Religion
Old Waterworks		October 13, 1953	Main St. N of Lehigh River Bridge, Bethlehem; 40.62°N 75.3828°W	City	Business & Industry, Environment
Pennsylvania Canal		April 12, 1949	U.S. 611, NE of Coffeetown (MISSING)	Roadside	Canals, Government & Politics 19th Century, Navigation, Transportation
Pennsylvania Canal		April 12, 1949	U.S. 611, NE of Coffeetown	Roadside	Canals, Navigation, Transportation
Pennsylvania Canal		April 12, 1949	S Delaware Dr. (PA 611) at S junction w/ Canal Rd., S of Raubsville; 40.62705°N 75.19105°W	Roadside	Canals, Navigation, Transportation
Portland Cement		n/a	Bath Pike Rd. (PA 248) at Christian Spgs. Rd., .2 mile W of Nazareth	Roadside	Business & Industry
Portland Cement		n/a	Pa. 611 S of Martins Creek; 40.76543°N 75.17838°W	Roadside	Business & Industry
Portland Cement		n/a	Pa. 329, .5 mile E of Northampton (Missing?); 40.73417°N 75.33672°W	Roadside	Business & Industry
Pulaski's Banner		October 12, 1974	W. Market St. between Heckewelder Pl. and New St., at Moravian Cemetery, Bethlehem; 40.62062°N 75.38002°W	City	American Revolution, Military, Religion, Women
Robert H. Sayre		September 12, 1993	Sayre Mansion Inn, 250 Wyandotte Street (Pa. 378), Bethlehem	City	Business & Industry, Education, Iron, Medicine & Science, Professions & Vocations, Railroads
Samuel Phillippe		July 20, 1953	S. 3rd St. just N of Pine St., Easton; 40.69055°N 75.20932°W	City	Invention, Professions & Vocations, Sports
Sisters' House		October 13, 1953	50 W. Church St., Bethlehem; 40.6188°N 75.3805°W	City	American Revolution, Religion, Women
Slate Industry		August 6, 1947	Market St. (PA 512) near 1st St., Bangor; 40.86705°N 75.20617°W	Roadside	Business & Industry, Ethnic & Immigration
Sullivan Campaign		August 5, 1947	Knox Ave. (SR 2025, former PA 115) near Raub St., just N of Easton; 40.70592°N 75.21265°W	Roadside	American Revolution, Military, Native American
Sullivan Expedition Against the Iroquois Indians, 1779 - Heller's Tavern (PLAQUE)		1929	PA 512 just N of SR 1028, Wind Gap	Plaque	American Revolution, Military, Native American, Inns & Taverns
Sullivan Expedition Against the Iroquois Indians, 1779 - Sullivan Road (PLAQUE)		n/a	Junction Sullivan Trail & Knox Ave.(following SR 2025, former PA 115), just N of Easton; 40.70593°N 75.21137°W	Plaque	American Revolution, Military, Native American, Roads
Sullivan's March		August 5, 1947	S Broadway (PA 512) just N of Male Rd. (SR 1028), Wind Gap; 40.83915°N 75.29638°W	Roadside	American Revolution, Military
Sun Inn		October 13, 1953	560 Main St. near W Broad St., Bethlehem; 40.62185°N 75.38185°W	City	Buildings, Business & Industry, Inns & Taverns
The Unknown Soldier - PLAQUE		n/a	DAR House, 1st Ave., Bethlehem; 40.62067°N 75.38547°W	Plaque	American Revolution, Military
Walking Purchase		June 20, 1947	Pa. 329 in Northampton (Missing)	Roadside	Early Settlement, Native American, William Penn
Walking Purchase		March 18, 1948	L.R. 48068 N. of Northampton	Roadside	Early Settlement, Government & Politics 18th Century, Native American, William Penn
Whitefield House		November 18, 1966	Off Pa. 191 (E. Center St.) at S. New St., Nazareth	Roadside	African American, Education, Religion
Whitefield House - PLAQUE		1931	PA 12 at Nazareth	Plaque	African American, Early Settlement, Education, Houses & Homesteads, Religion

== See also ==
- List of Pennsylvania state historical markers
- National Register of Historic Places listings in Northampton County, Pennsylvania
