= Fountain Hill Historic District =

Historic district in Pennsylvania, United States

- U.S. National Register of Historic Places
- U.S. Historic district
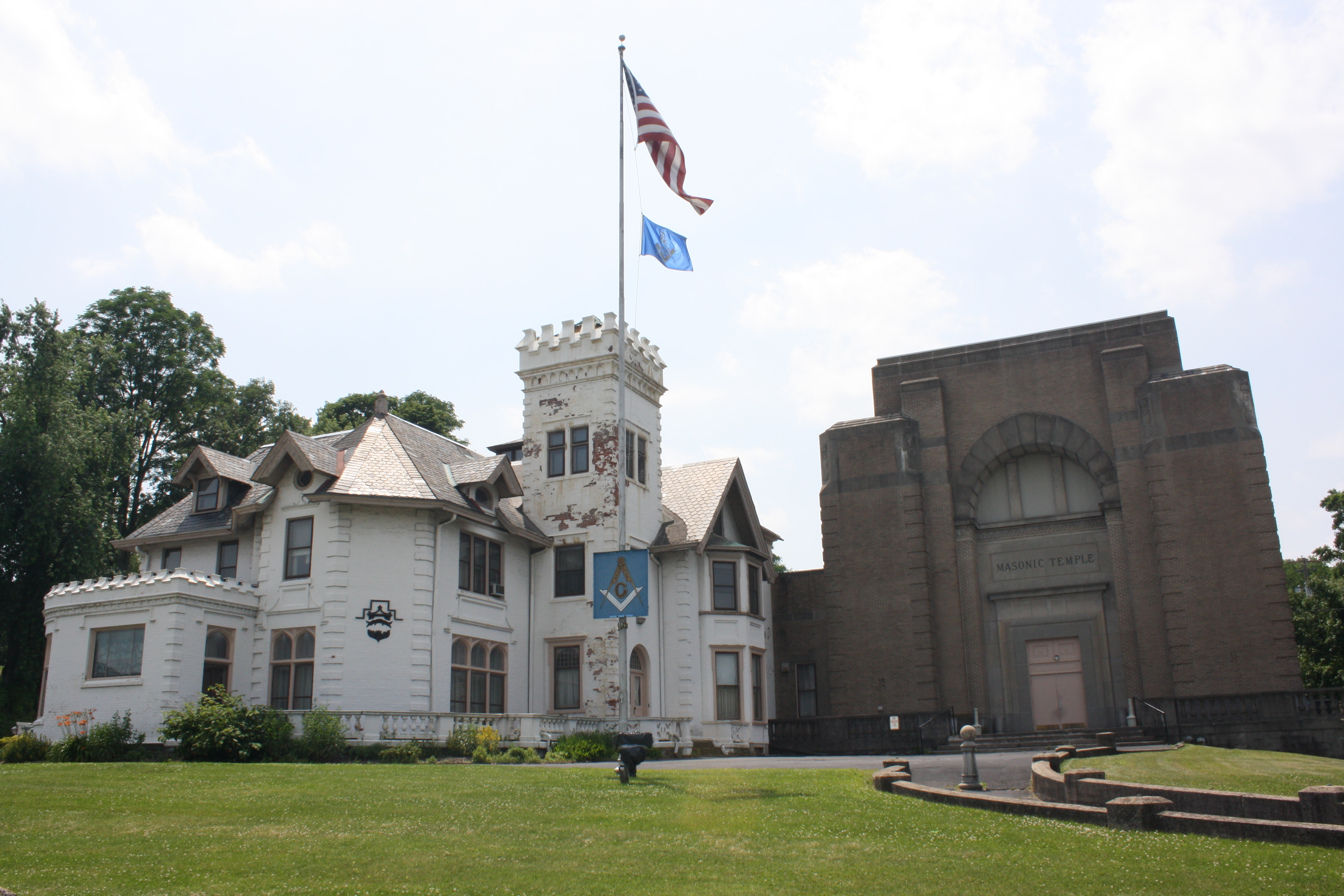
- Masonic Temple in June 2013

- Location within Pennsylvania Location within the United States
- Location: Roughly bounded by Brighton, Wyandotte, W. Fourth and Seminole Sts., and Delaware Ave., Bethlehem, Pennsylvania, U.S.
- Coordinates: 40°36′40″N 75°23′10″W
- Area: 33.6 acres (13.6 ha)
- Architectural style: Late 19th And 20th Century Revivals, Late Victorian, Gothic Revival
- NRHP reference No.: 88000450
- Added to NRHP: April 21, 1988

Fountain Hill Historic District is a national historic district located at Bethlehem, Lehigh County and Northampton County, Pennsylvania. Despite the name, it mostly excludes the borough of Fountain Hill, which is an independent municipality located mostly to the southwest of the district.

The district includes 44 contributing buildings and 1 contributing structure. The buildings include elaborate, architecturally distinctive mansions, smaller managers' and merchants' dwellings, and public church buildings. The mansions are the focus of the district and include the Linderman / Schwab Mansion (c. 1870), Robert Sayre House (c. 1857), and Elisha Packer Wilbur Mansion (c. 1863). Notable non-residential buildings include the Masonic Temple and Cathedral Church of the Nativity (c. 1866). The Hill to Hill Bridge is also included in the district.

Located in the district is the separately listed Lehigh Valley Railroad Headquarters Building.

It was added to the National Register of Historic Places in 1988.

== Gallery ==
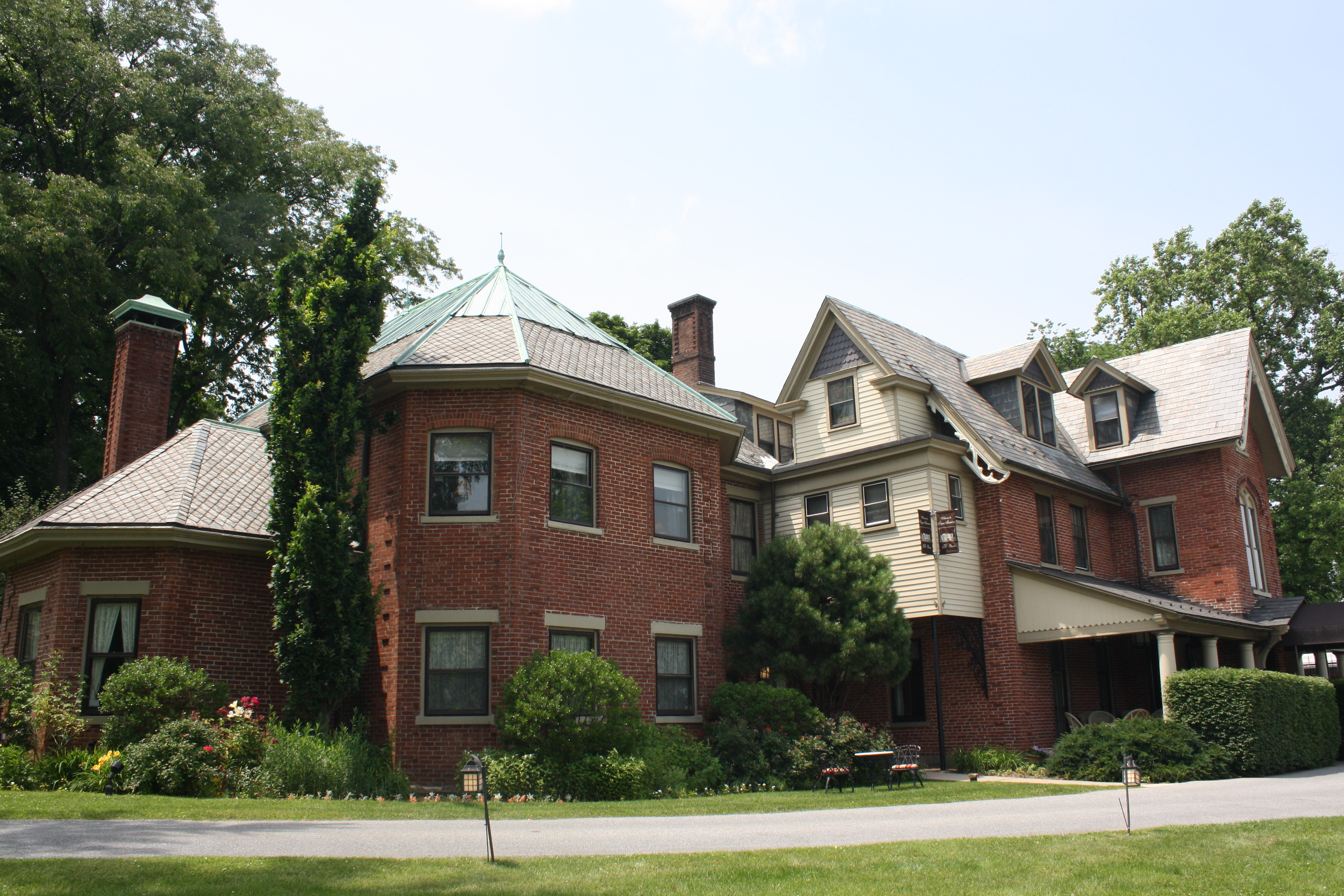
Robert Sayre Mansion

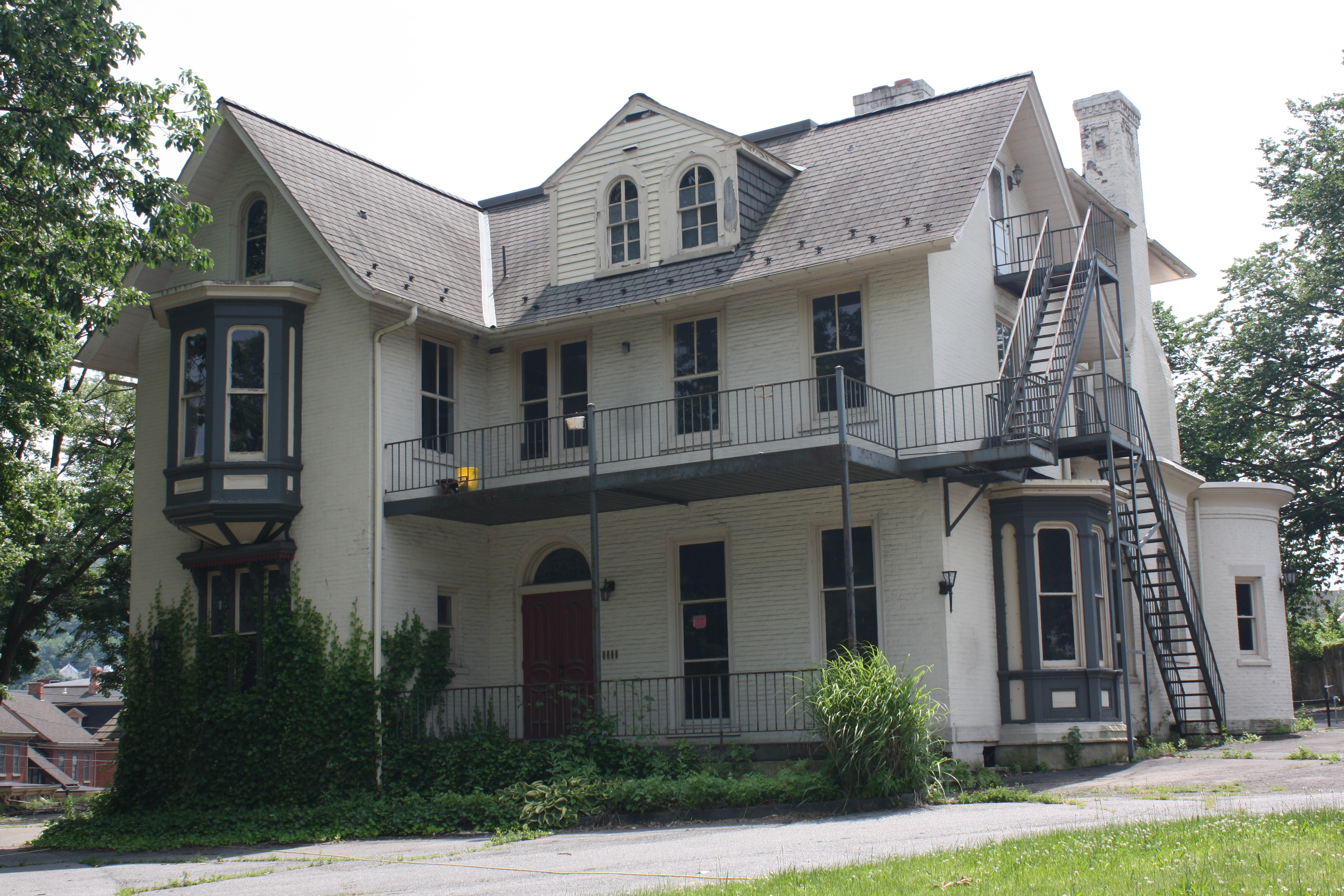
William Sayre Mansion

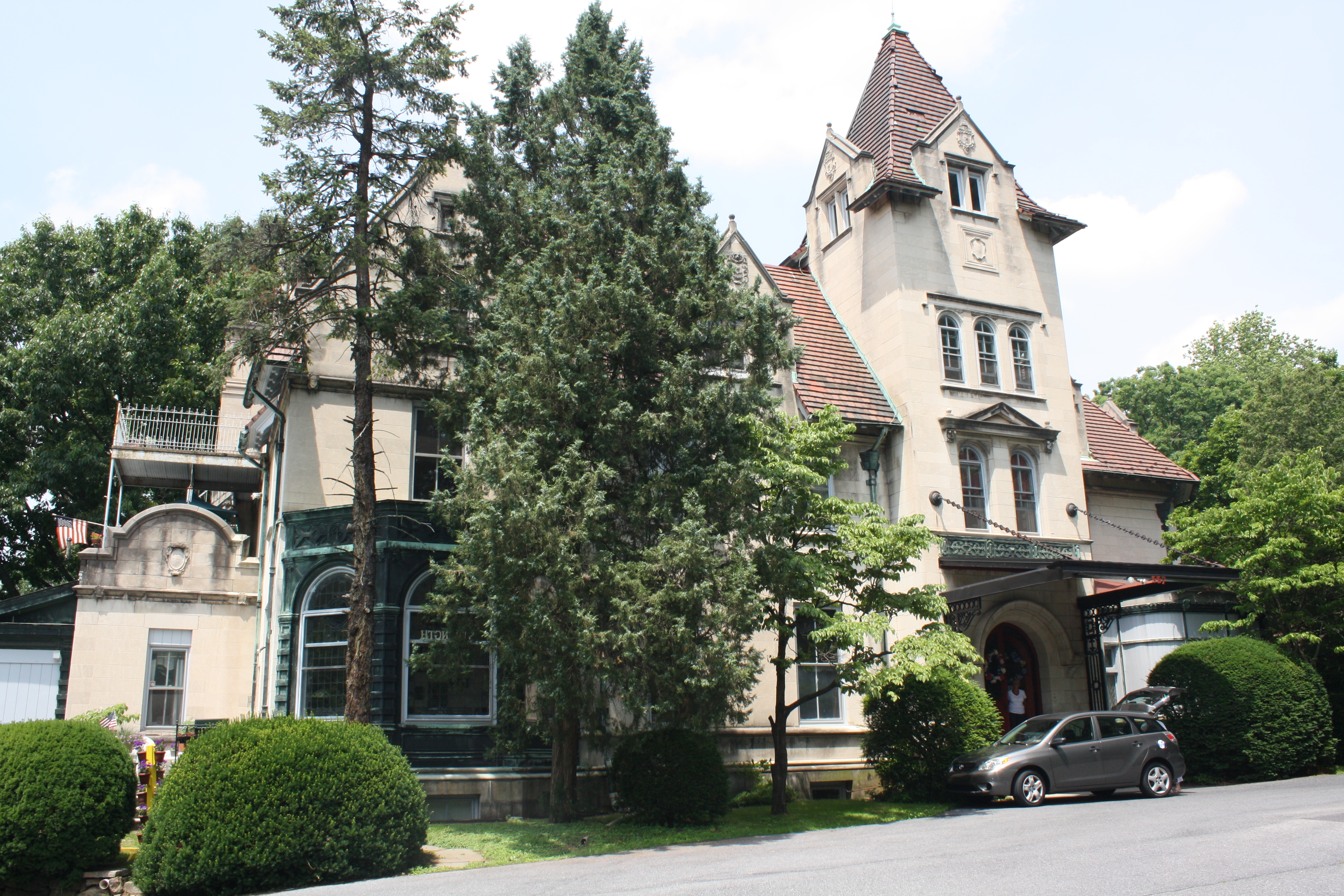
Linderman-Schwab Mansion

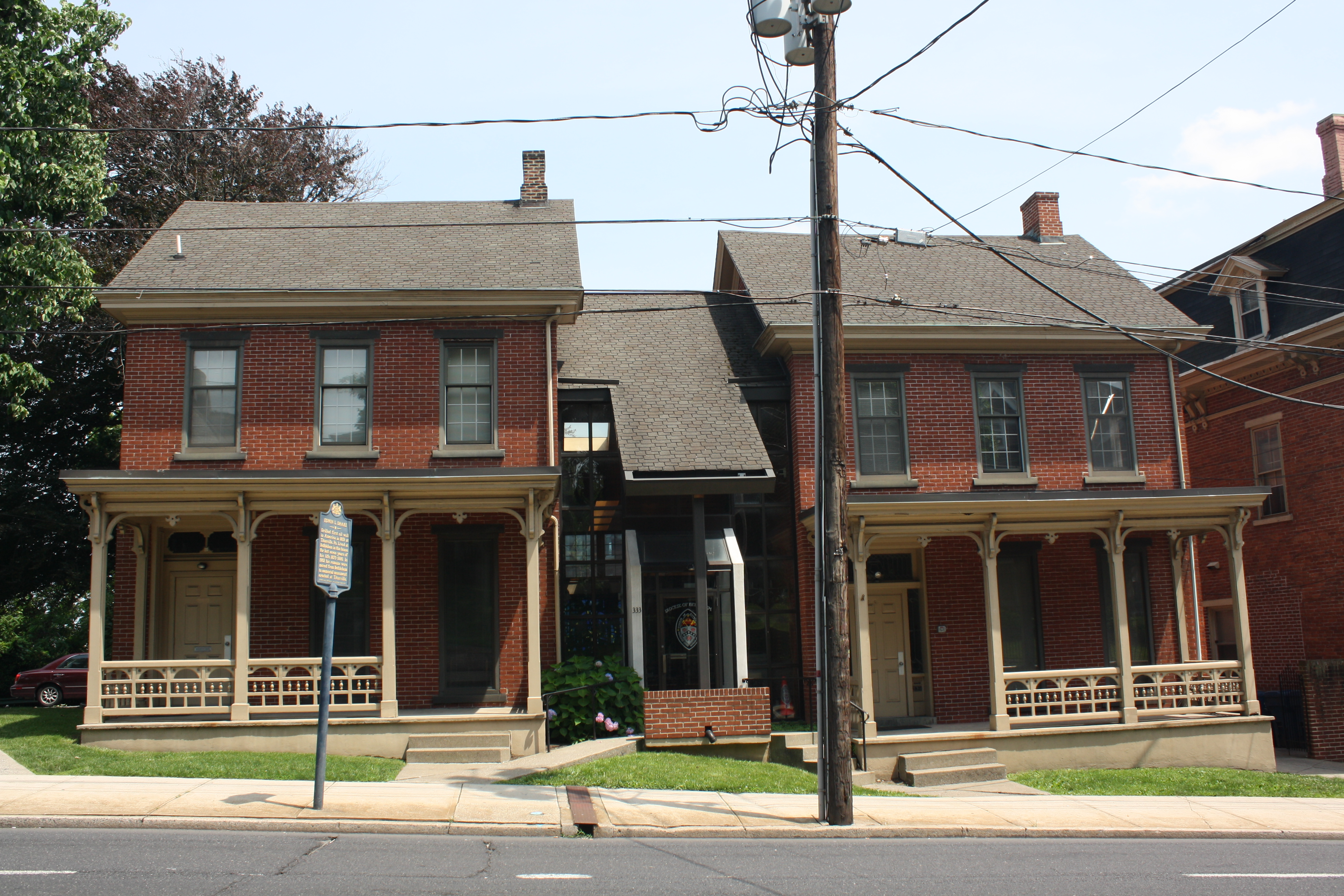
Edwin Drake House

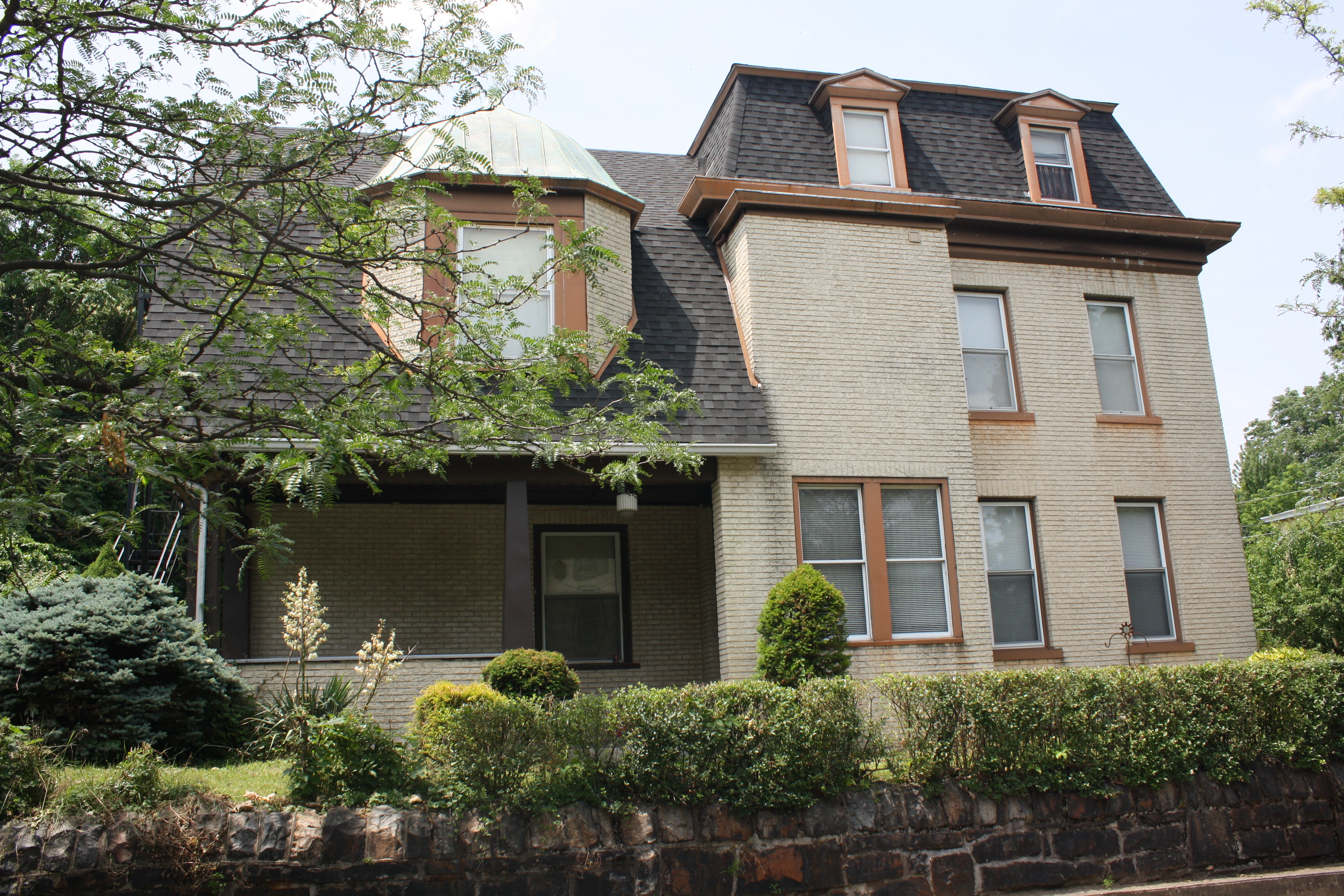
Residence on Seneca Street

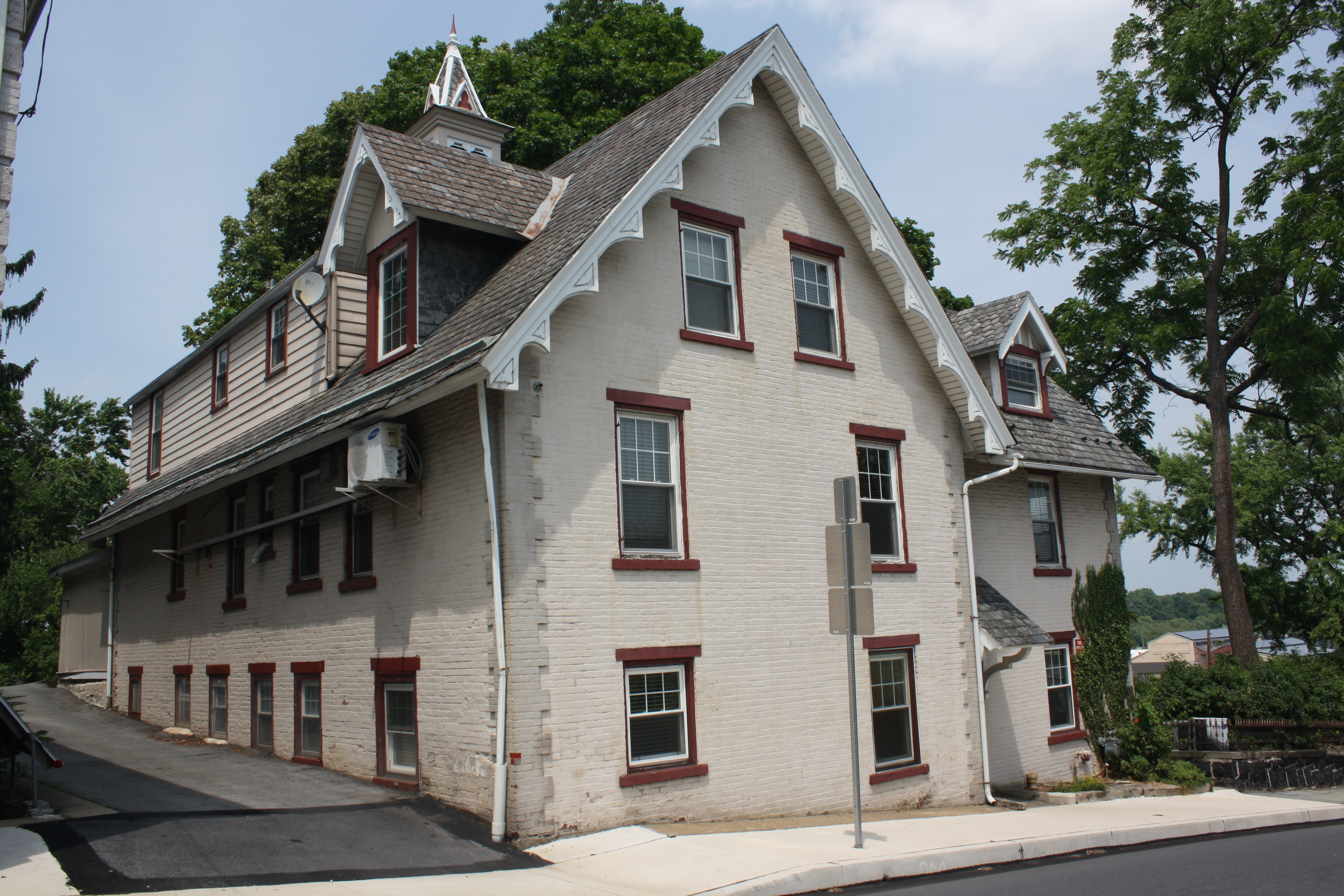
Residence on West Third Street

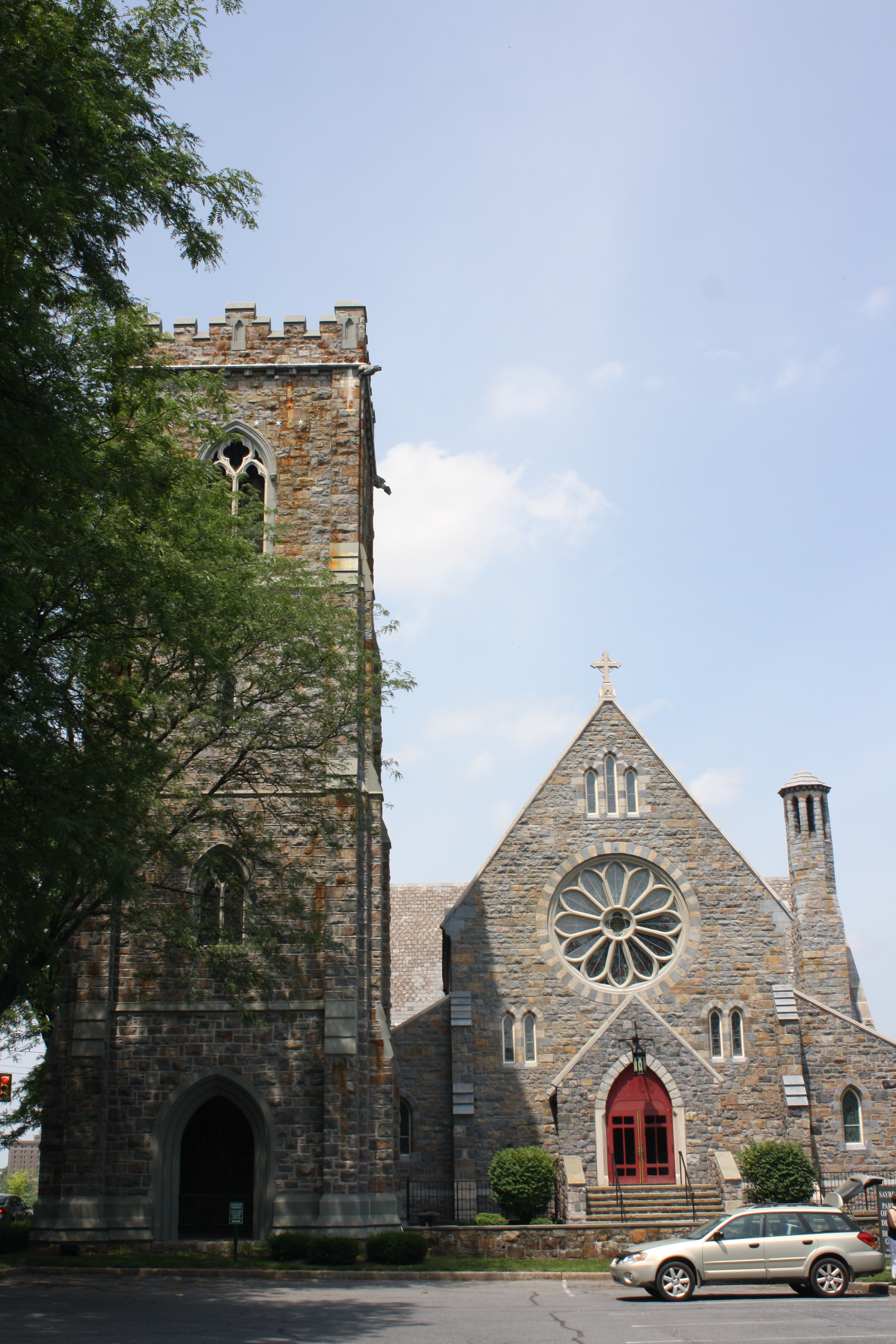
Nativity Episcopal Cathedral

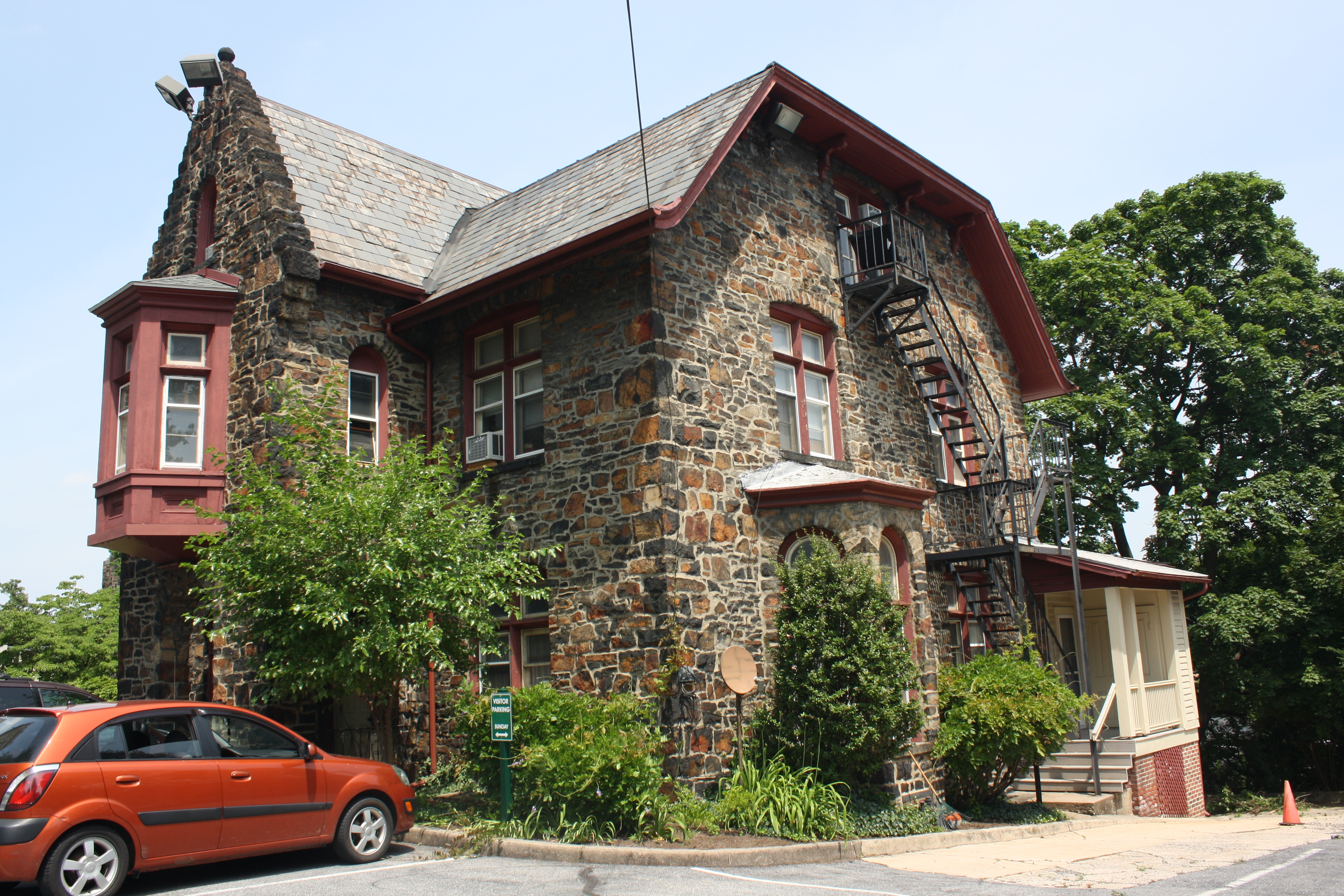
Parish Office Hall at Nativity Episcopal Cathedral

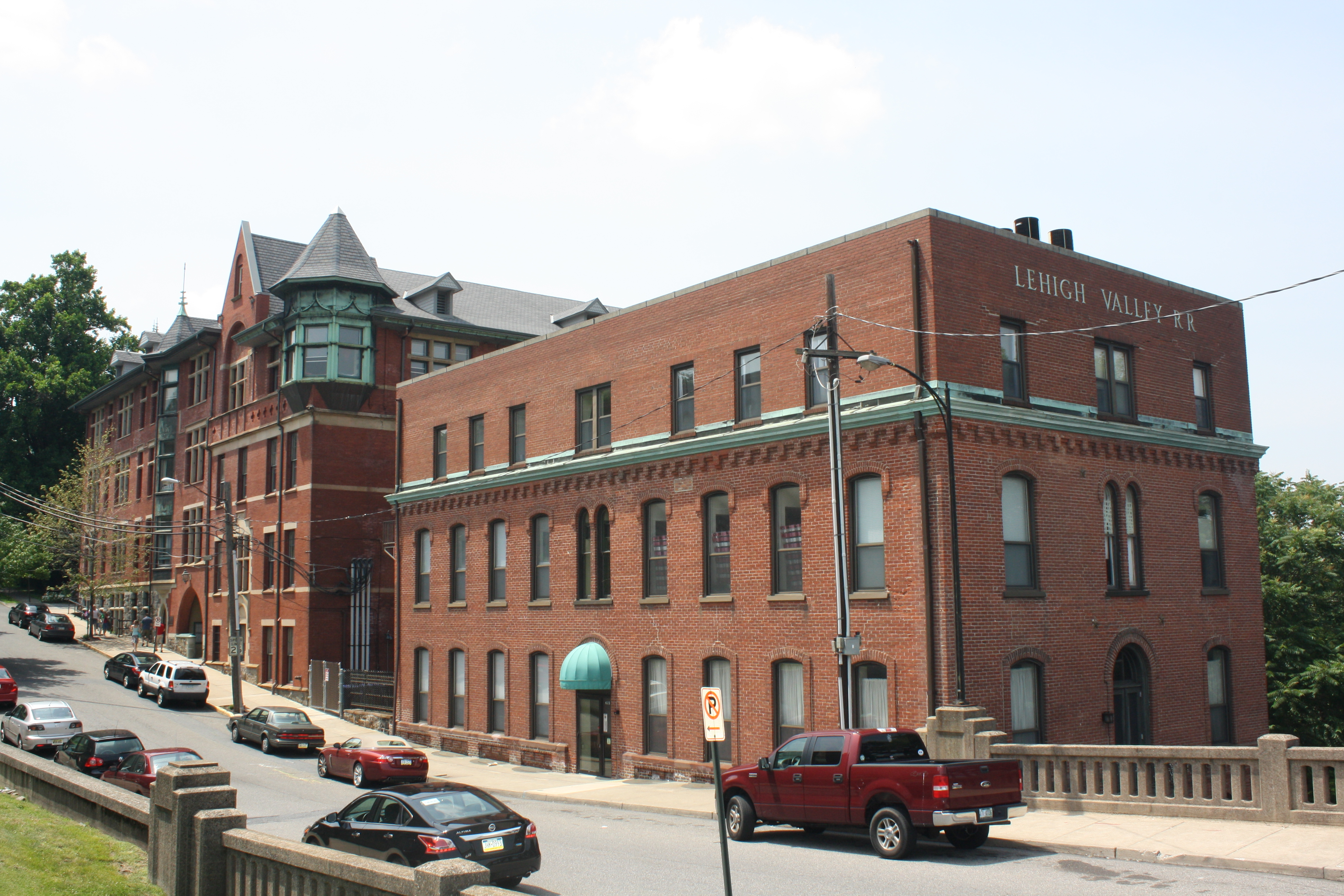
Wilbur Trust and Lehigh Valley Railroad Headquarters

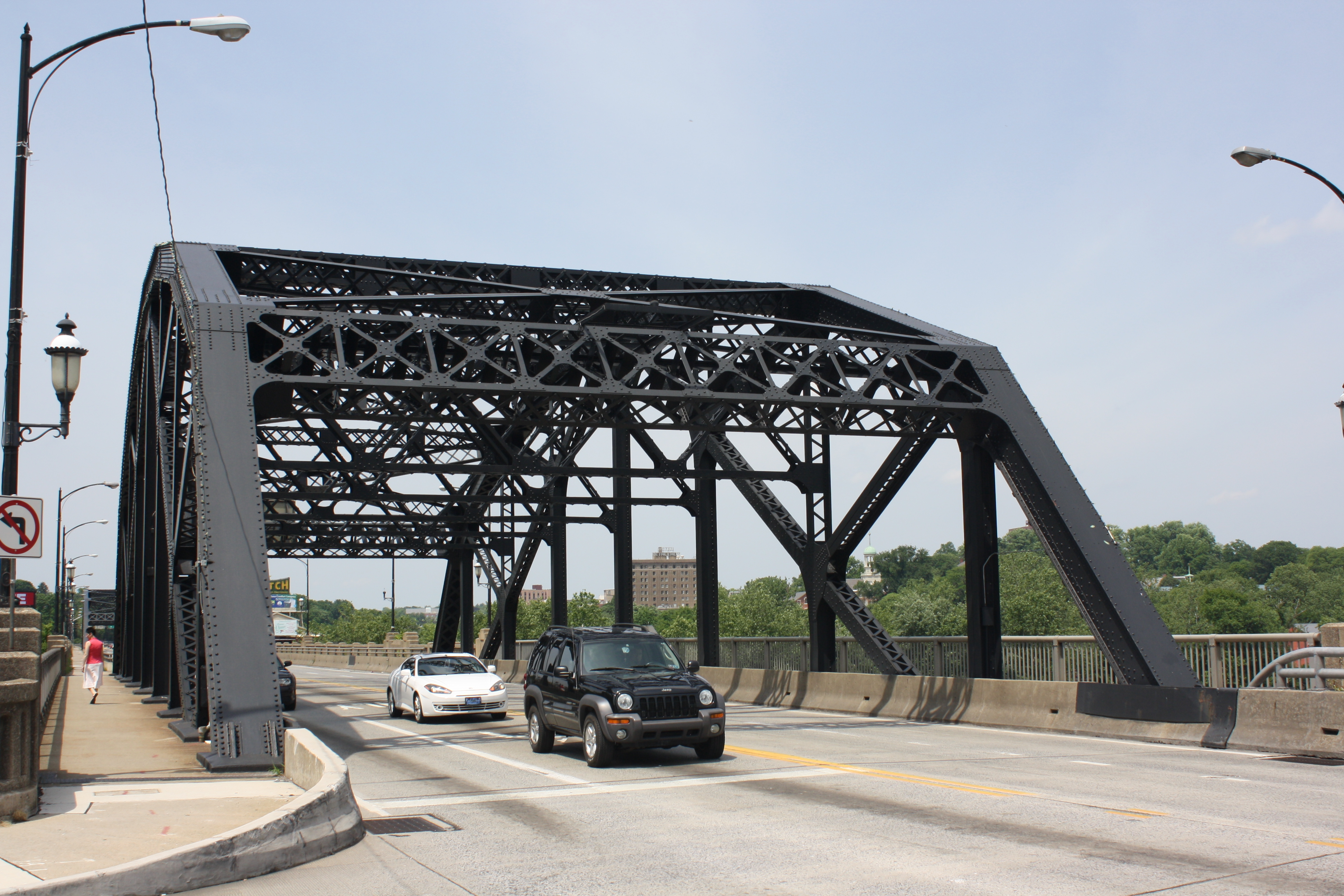
Hill to Hill Bridge
