= College Hill Residential Historic District =

Historic district in Pennsylvania, United States

- U.S. National Register of Historic Places
- U.S. Historic district
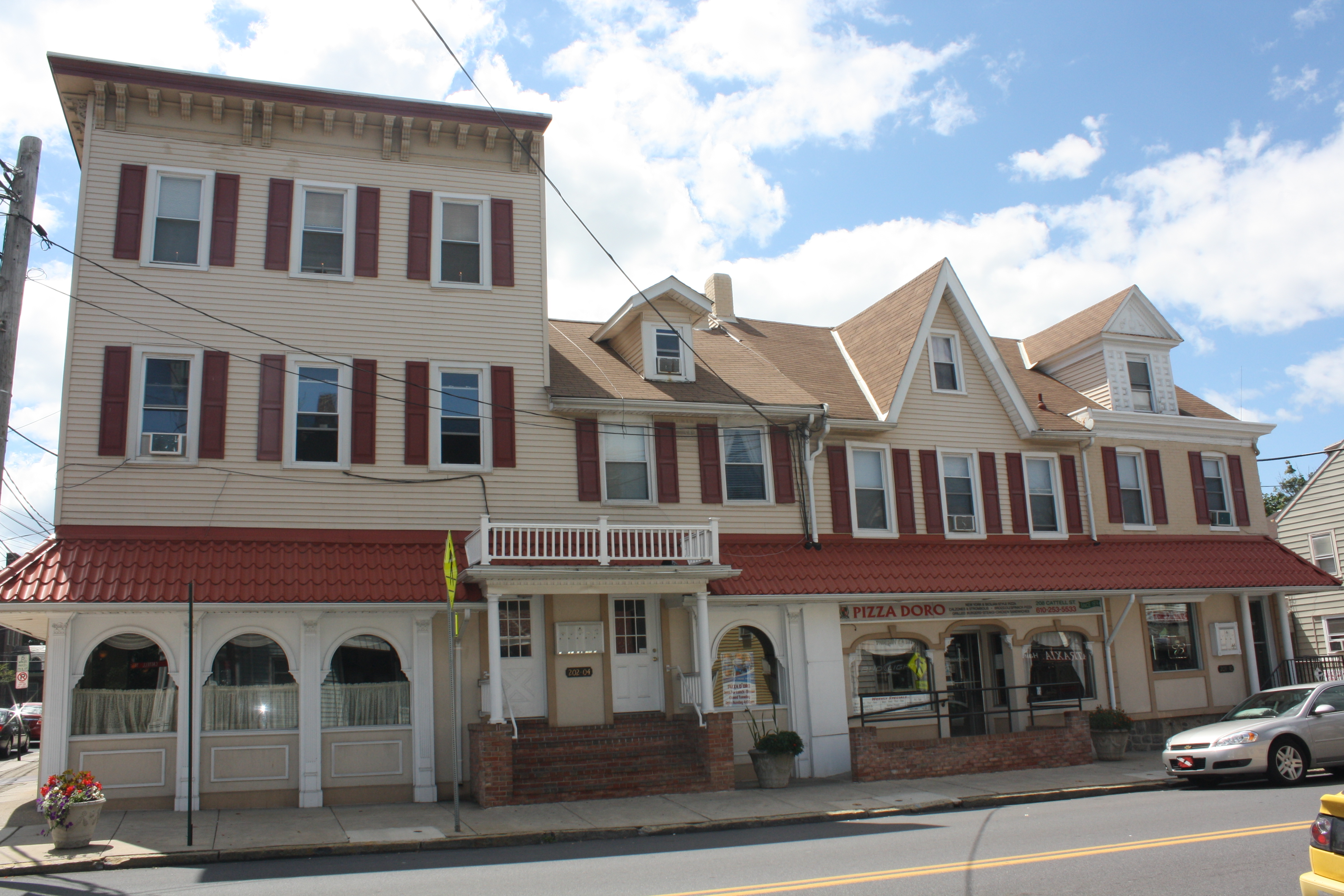
- College Hill, Cattell Street. August 2013.

- Location within Pennsylvania Location within the United States
- Location: Roughly bounded by McCartney St., Pierce St., Pardee St., the Forks Township line and the Delaware R., Easton, Pennsylvania
- Coordinates: 40°42′17″N 75°12′17″W
- Area: 366 acres (148 ha)
- Built: 1887
- Architect: Michler, William; Speer Lumber Co.
- Architectural style: Late 19th And 20th Century Revivals, Late Victorian, Federal
- NRHP reference No.: 91000506
- Added to NRHP: May 1, 1991

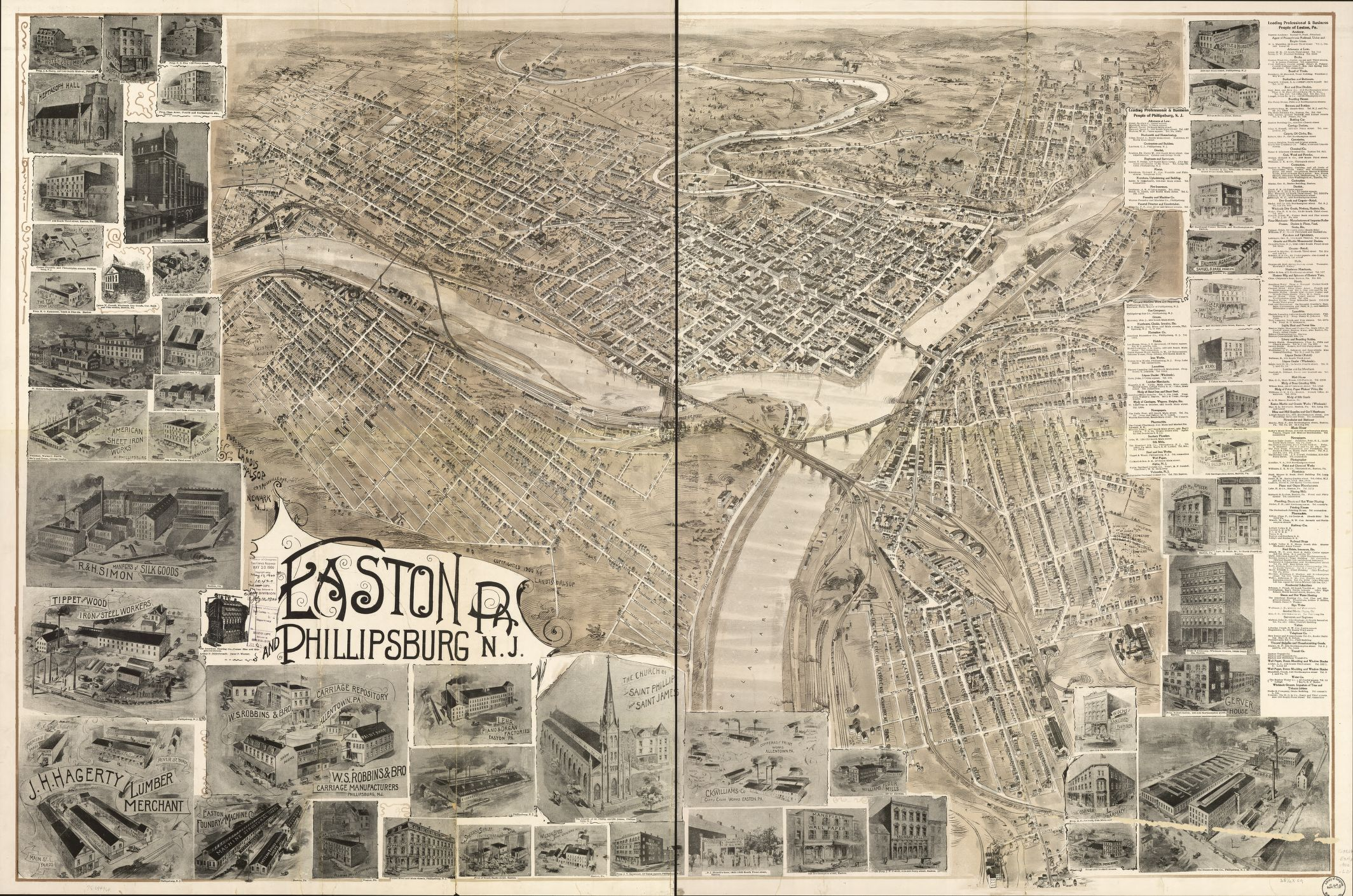
Aerial view of Easton, Pennsylvania, c. 1900

College Hill is a residential neighborhood in Easton, Pennsylvania. The neighborhood is situated on the hill overlooking downtown Easton which was once known as Mount Lafayette, and before that, Mount Washington. Lafayette College borders the neighborhood on its southwest side. The northern boundary of the neighborhood is Forks Township. The boundary lies along Chestnut Ridge, a steep hill that rises to 700 feet (210 m). College Hill has a total of three historic religious institutional buildings, three parks, and the remains of Rinek Mansion grounds.

The neighborhood has 855 buildings. The northeast sector of College Hill contains professionally designed buildings, primarily built between 1830 and 1940 while the northwest sector contains a high concentration of 20th century pattern catalog houses which was built by the Speer Lumber company. The district is primarily known for its mix of architectural styles. The neighborhood also contains many small businesses.

Many College Hill residents are professors at Lafayette College, which lies southwest of College Hill. Generally, residents of College Hill are fairly wealthy and well educated.

== History ==
=== 18th century ===
In 1736, Benjamin Eastburn, Surveyor General of Pennsylvania, allocated the original 1,000-acre tract of land of Easton for Thomas Penn. The southern three-quarters of this land area were to become part of College Hill. Between July 27 and August 23, 1789, this land tract was resurveyed and divided by the proprietors of Pennsylvania. The occupation and use of this land is unknown for this period of time.

=== 19th century ===
In 1832, Lafayette College moved into the area, as it bought nine acres of land and moved to College Hill in May 1834. Lafayette's presence brought new growth within the area, as new residential projects were undertaken to accommodate new professors and staff. Development occurred quickly, and within the next 40 years, the majority of the area below Parson St was nearly full of homes. An important time for College Hill's history occurred in 1887, when an electric trolley line was set up by the Lafayette Traction Company under David W. Nevin. Over the next couple of years, this line was extended, and dramatically increased the growth within College Hill, attracting middle and upper-class families to the area.

=== 20th century ===
In the first half of the 20th century, the Speer Lumber Co. of Easton settled in College Hill. The company supplied lumber and provided high quality millwork to the Lehigh Valley and parts of New Jersey. It later became the Hummel Lumber Company in the 1940s and still exists today at its original location. A majority of the 200 residences that were built by the company were based on old and famous architectural styles.

In 1992, the College Hill Residential Historic District was added to the National Register of Historic Places in recognition of the extensive collection of stately homes and mansions that were constructed between 1830 and 1940, including the McKelvy House that was designed in 1888 by the renowned firm of McKim, Mead and White. The push for College Hill to become a recognized historical district was made by Sal Panto Jr., who was the mayor of Easton from 1984 to 1992 and 2008–present. College Hill becoming a Historical District helped the city to preserve more of the traditional and cultural buildings on the Hill and have more protective regulations and control on what could be constructed.

== Demographics ==
As given from a modified 2010 Census report, College Hill has an estimated total population of 4.67 thousand per square mile. By including Lafayette College into the demographic report, 31.5% of the population is found to be 18–20 years old, and 6.8% at 21 years old. After that, the next highest number is 5.54% at 40–44 years old. From an ethnicity and racial standpoint, College Hill is estimated to be 76.3% white, 7.4% Hispanic, 5.9% Black, 5.5% Asian, 4.6% Mixed, and 0.3% Other.

There are a total of 21,738 households in College Hill. 14,298 are family households and the average person per household is 2.63.

The median income for people under 25 years old is $38,963, $62,838 from 25 to 44, $75,163 at 45–64 and $50,166 for 65 and over. Since 2000, there has been a 28% increase/decrease in income and 4% since 2010. The average household income is estimated to be $81,278 with a median household income of $64,330.

== Significant contributing properties ==
Mckelvy House formerly known as “Oakhurst” is the home to the prestigious scholarship society at Lafayette College. Every year, a group of students are selected by faculty to live in the building and also participate in social and other intellectual activities. Mckelvy House was designed by one of the most prominent architectural firms in the 80's Mckim, Mead and White. McKelvy House exemplifies Stick and Shingle architecture. It was built in 1888 as a wedding present from John Eyerman, a Lafayette College Graduate to his bride Lucy Maxwell. In 1914, a member of the Lafayette College trustees purchased the building and made several renovations to it. After the necessary renovations, Lafayette College acquired the building in 1960 and made it the home to the college's scholar society. The house is sited on three acres and overlooks the Delaware River.

Nevin Park Fountain was once a historic and prominent symbol on College Hill but, in the 1940s the fountain in Nevin park was destroyed and melted down to support the efforts of the second World War. Despite many efforts to restore the fountain, it never came to fruition. In 2013, plans were announced to restore the fountain at Nevin park with significant improvements. In 2014, a three-tiered Victorian style fountain in a round base was finally built replicating an existing fountain in Marietta, GA. The restoration boosted economic growth of College Hill in the sense that it increased traffic to its key business corridor.

The Lafayette Inn has been a landmark of College Hill for centuries. Built in 1895, the Georgian mansion was originally meant to be an investment property by Elizabeth Wagner Leary. The land was part of the Wagner farm owned by one of Easton's original first settlers during the mid-1700s. The former Wagner farm properties on the west side of Cattell St. became highly sought-after, as development of College Hill was flourishing during the late 19th century. The house was renovated in 1917 and owned for two decades by George Elder, superintendent of Ingersoll Rand Co. After the Great Depression hit in 1929, the building was broken down into apartments and sold multiple times throughout the next thirty years. It was briefly owned by a Lafayette fraternity in 1958, but due to the continuous decline of the fraternity, it was left vacant once again by 1982. In 1986, investors saw potential in the remarkable building, and bought and converted the property into the now Easton hotel.

Francis A March School is a 111–112-year-old school located in Easton, Pennsylvania. It was named after Francis March, professor of English and philology at Lafayette College. He was the first-ever to hold the title "Professor of English Language and Literature" in both America and in Europe. He taught at Lafayette for 56 years and refused numerous offers to leave the school as he was very loyal to the school. He was so dedicated in the sense that, his son also went on to become a professor at Lafayette College. His hard work and dedication earned him a much deserved respect across the city of Easton and the entire Lafayette Community. In 1914, the Easton Area School District recognized his efforts by naming an elementary school after him. Francis A. March elementary school serves students in grades K through 5 from across the entire Easton community.

== Geology ==
The geological makeup of Easton, Pennsylvania comes from the activities of the Appalachian Valley and Ridge Physiological Province. They are split into two major zones, the Southern and Central Appalachians that lie between the Appalachian Plateau and the Blue Ridge Mountain. The Appalachian Valley's southern and central regions can be further split into two smaller sections called The Great Valley, to the east, and a more mountainous ridge to the west. This Great Valley contains three different sections: the Lehigh Valley (where the Easton is located), Lebanon Valley, and Cumberland Valley. Some of the rocks that make up the foundation for this region are limestone, slate, siltstone, scattered basalt, dolomite, shale, and sandstone.

== Streets and businesses ==
The district is a small neighborhood made up of fifteen mainly residential streets. Lafayette College lies south of College Hill.

Through the expansion of Lafayette College, Lafayette owns the majority of properties on certain streets such as the Monroe, McCartney, Hamilton, and Parsons streets.

College Hill is home to over 17 small businesses, which largely consist of small businesses that sell specialized goods, and family run restaurants and bars. Out of all of the businesses on the hill, Lafayette College brings in the most revenue. Most businesses on College Hill tend to be found on Cattell Street. The district also contains churches, the March Street School, the Municipal Water Filtration Plant and Reservoir buildings. Though the city of Easton has the capacity to attract larger businesses, due to the volume of traffic that passes through the town, it remains a less commercialized area to preserve the city's unique, quirky, niche-like feel. Businesses on College Hill tend to thrive while Lafayette College's classes are in session.

== Lafayette College expansion controversy ==
Over the last 30 years, Lafayette College has purchased over 173 properties on College Hill and intends to purchase even more. The college now owns more than twenty percent of the 924 properties in the College Hill Residential District. Lafayette College has pushed forward plans to expand its size by tearing down a dozen homes that it owns at McCartney and High streets and Cattell and High streets. The plan is to replace these homes with more student housing and college commercial space as the school continue to expand. This expansion is part of Lafayette College's broader plan to bring in more students to fund more financial aid and make the school more affordable. There has been a lot of backlash against the plan by College Hill and Easton residents. Many residents view it as an increased encroachment on many of the historically registered Victorian-era homes placed on the National Register of Historic Places. Other concerns among residents include an increase in parking and traffic issues. Many residents fear the expansion will leave them homeless and want assurances of safety of their homes.

The proposed zoning ordinance changes for the "McCartney Dorm Project" that would permit the college to go ahead and start building have been delayed multiple times since the plan was introduced in 2015.

== Gallery ==
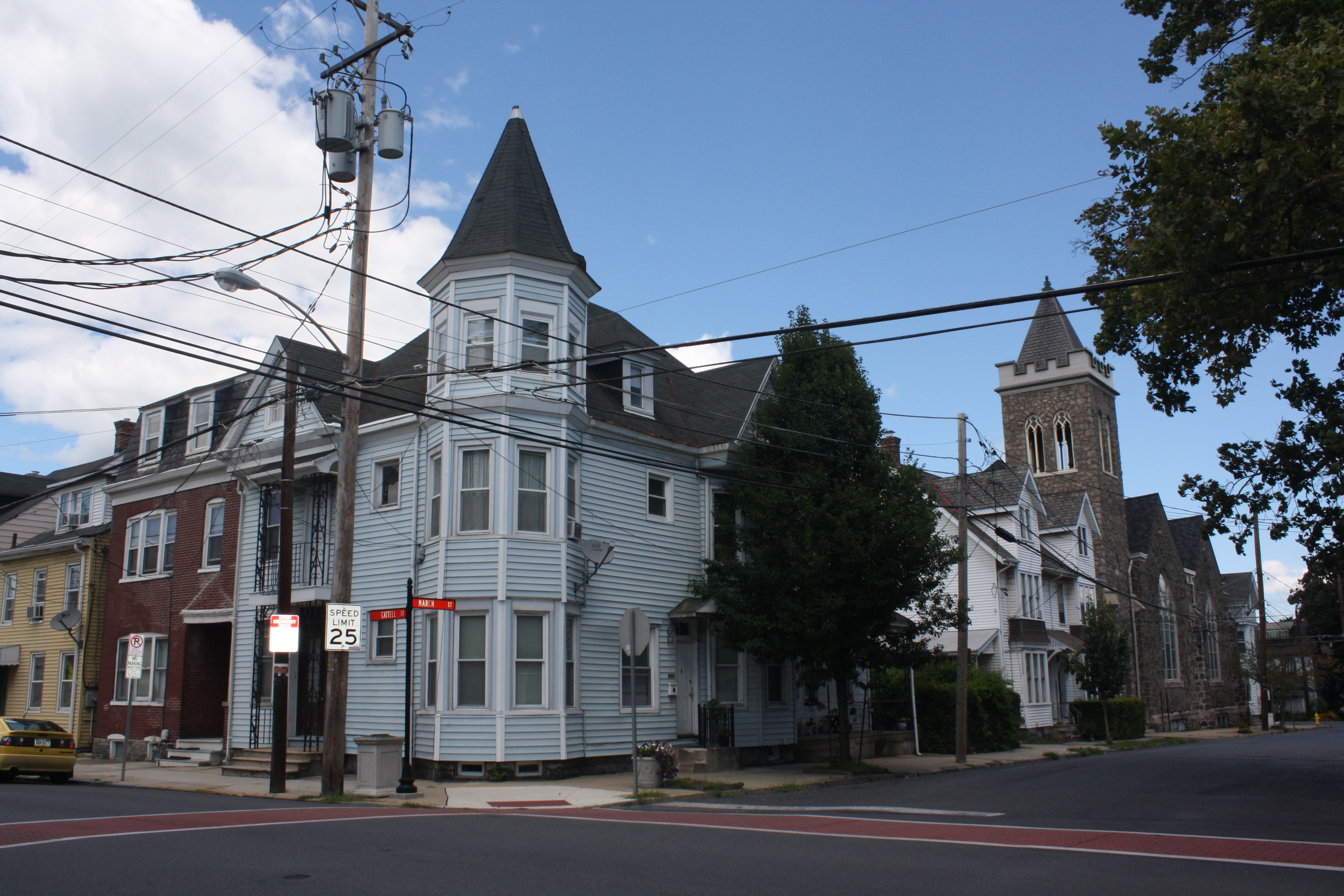
Cattell St.

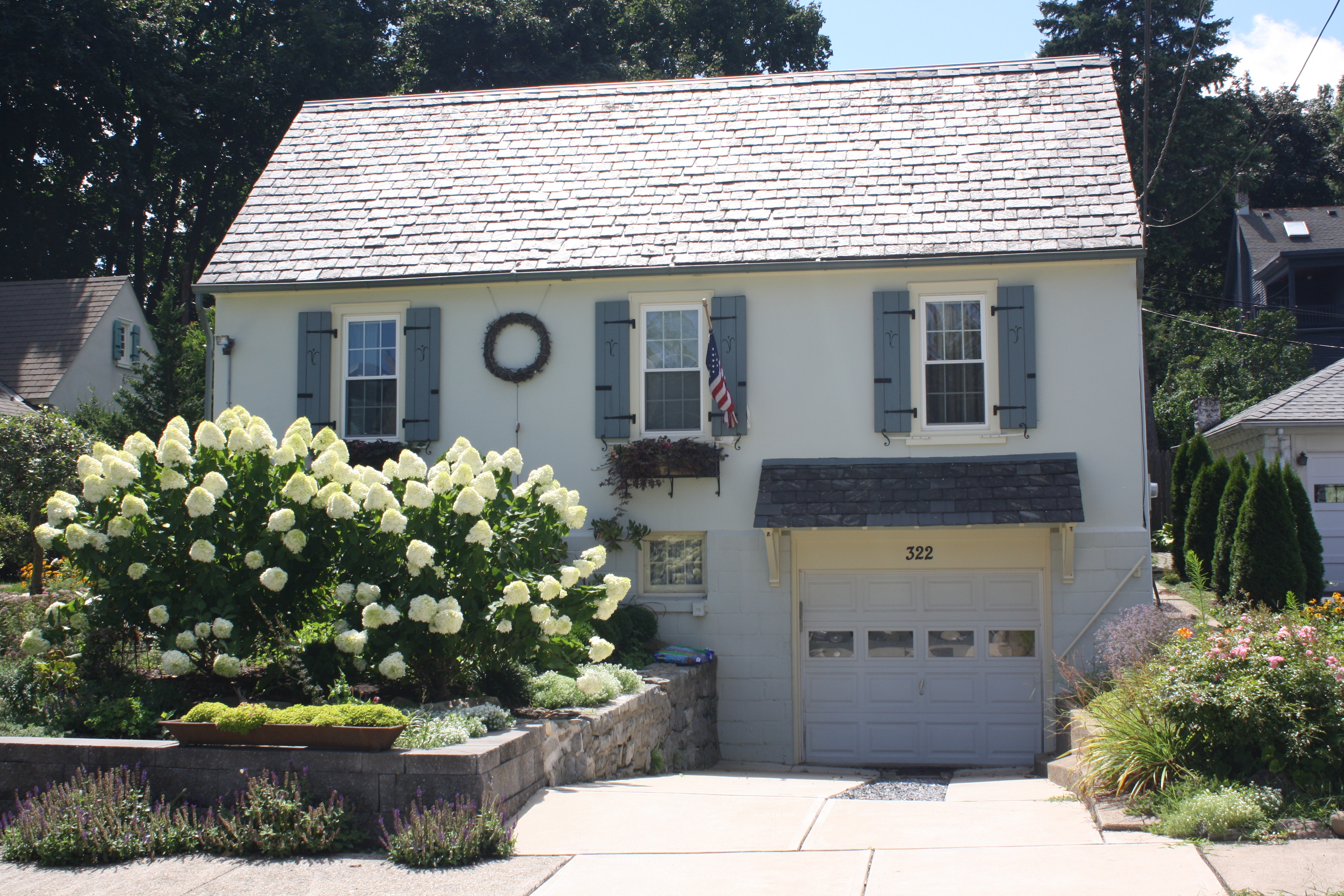
Brodhead St.

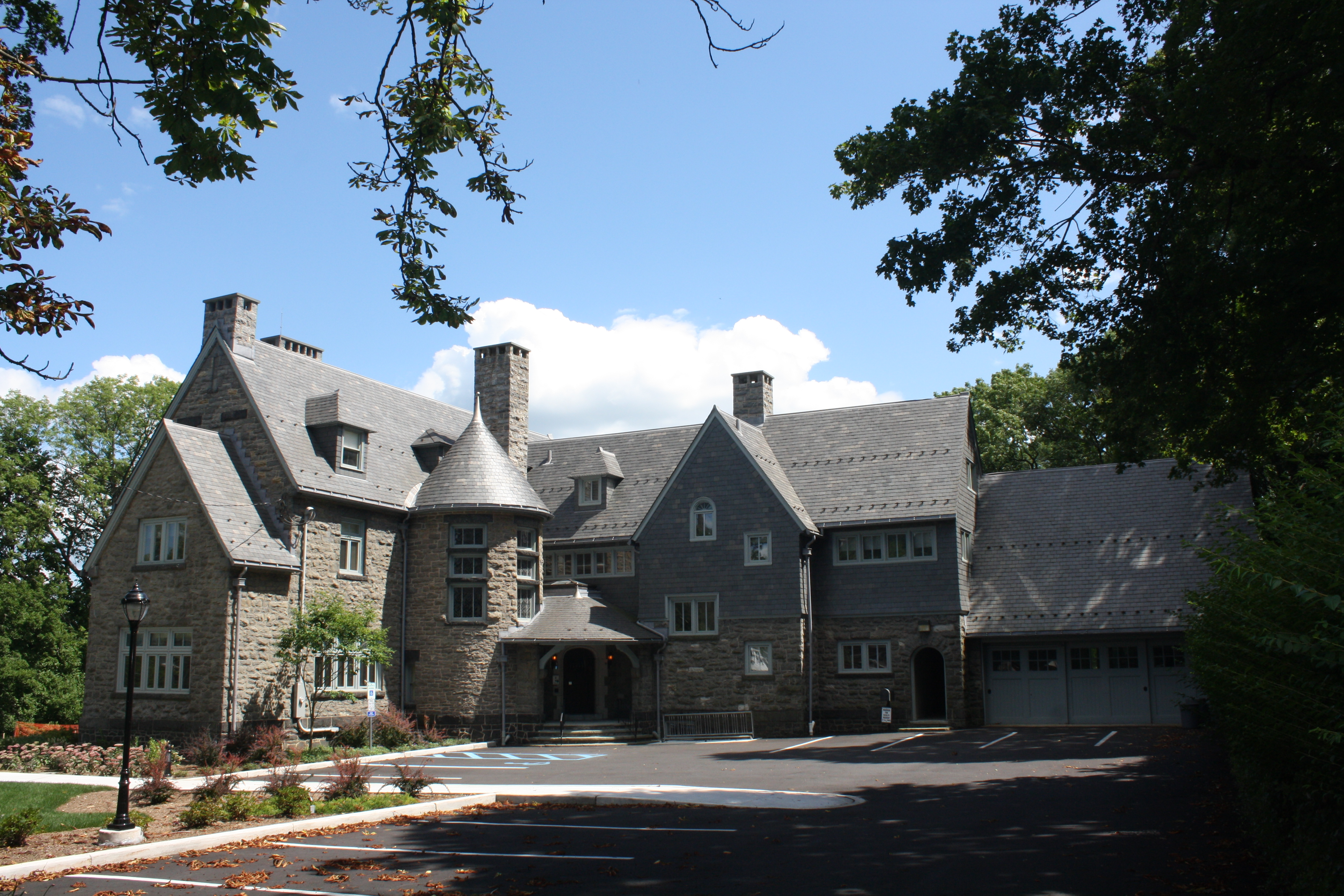
McKelvy House, High St.

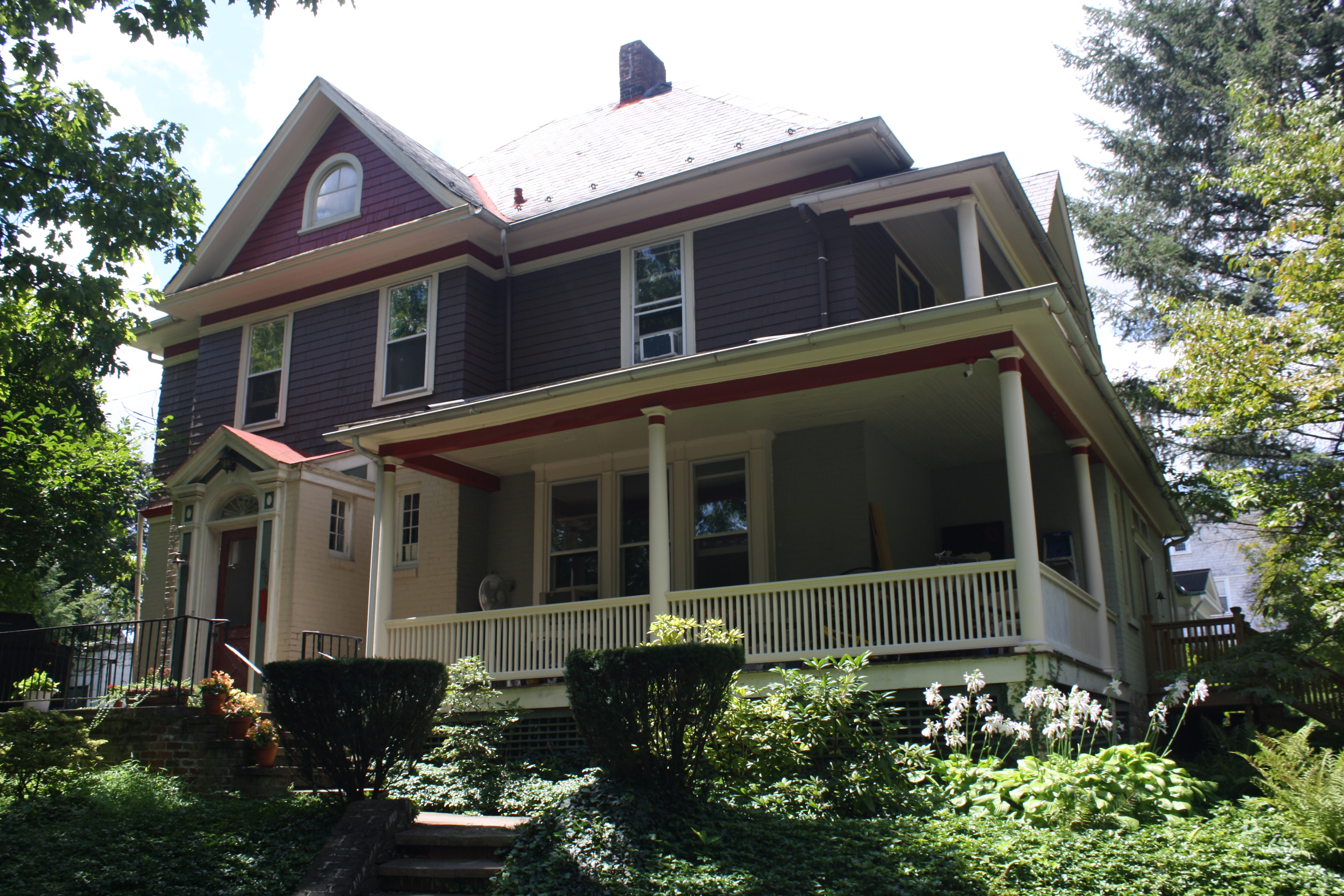
Residence on Weygadt Dr.

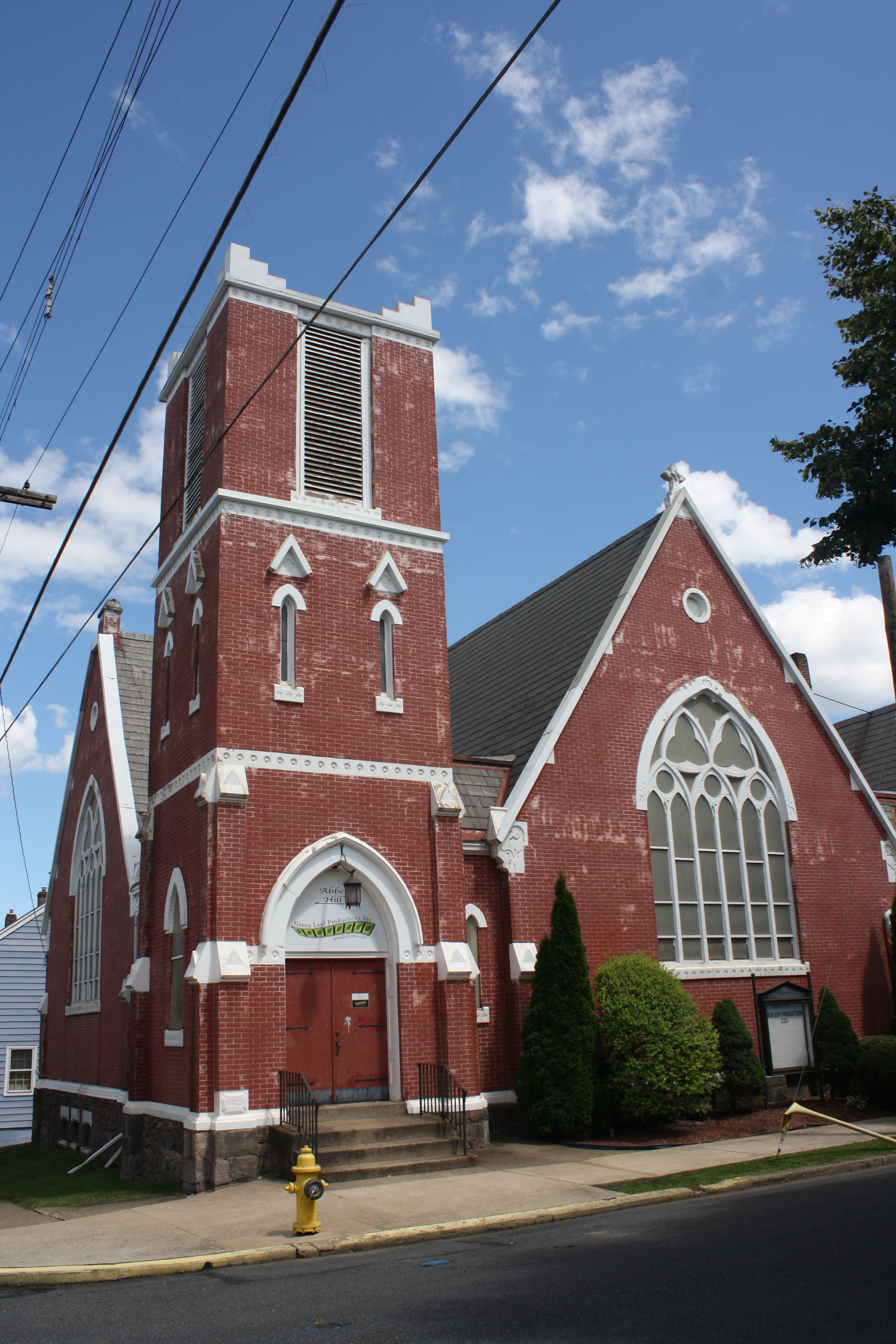
St. Peter Lutheran Church.

== See also ==
- National Register of Historic Places listings in Northampton County, Pennsylvania
