= Illick's Mill =

- U.S. National Register of Historic Places
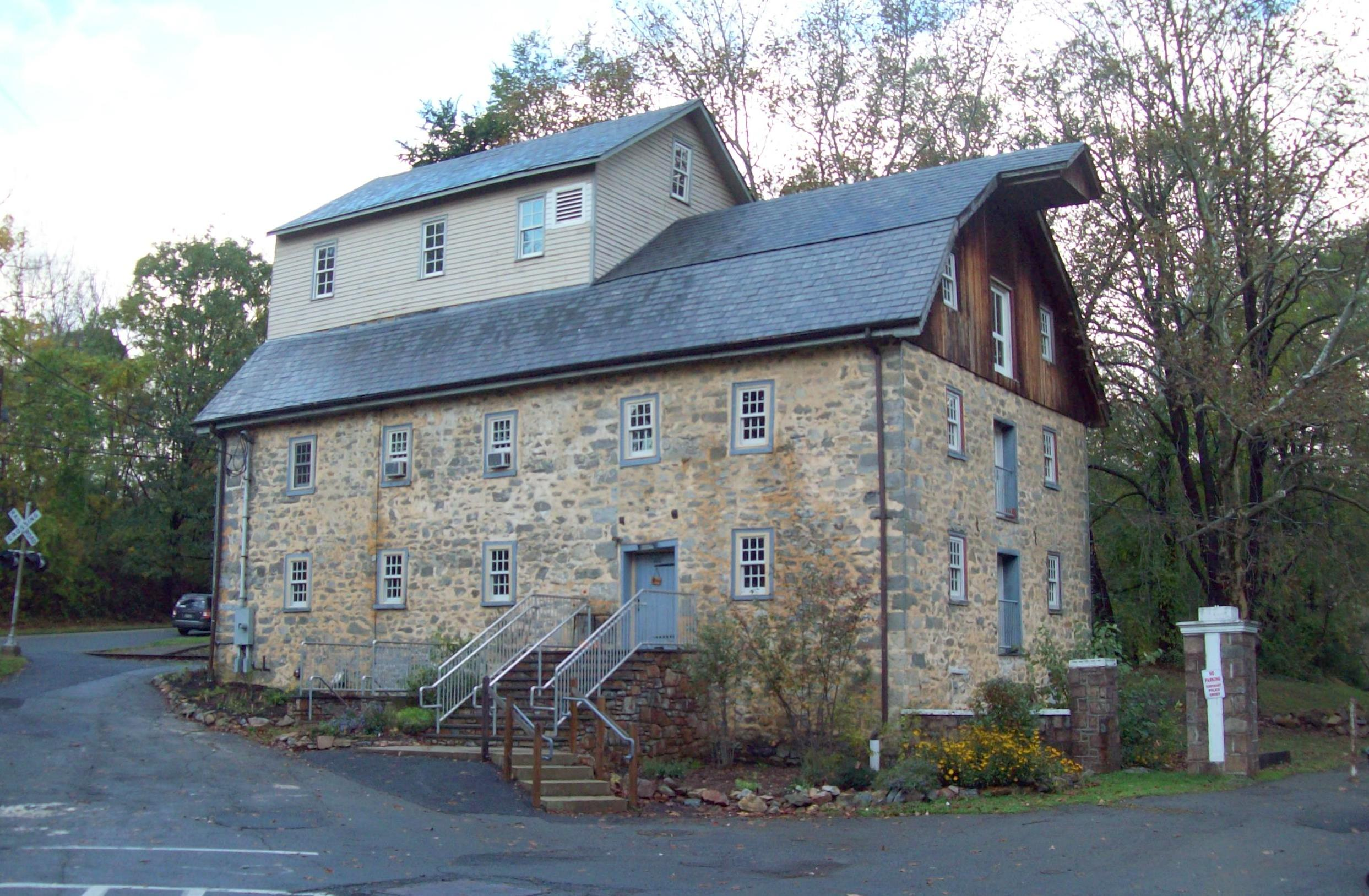
- Illick's Mill, October 2011

- Location within Pennsylvania Location within the United States
- Location: 130 Illick's Mill Rd., Bethlehem, Pennsylvania
- Coordinates: 40°38′30″N 75°22′51″W
- Area: less than one acre
- Built: 1856
- Architect: Peter, John; Illick, Joseph
- NRHP reference No.: 05000450
- Added to NRHP: May 20, 2005

Illick's Mill, also known as Peters' Mill and Monocacy Milling Co., is a historic grist mill located in Monocacy Park at Bethlehem, Northampton County, Pennsylvania. It was built in 1856, and is a four level, vernacular stone mill building with a heavy timber frame interior. The original building measured approximately 34 by 40 feet (10 by 12 m). The building was expanded in the 1880s with a 20-foot addition and the addition of the fourth level and a monitor roof. The mill was formerly the home of the Fox Environmental Center.

It was added to the National Register of Historic Places in 2005. As of October 2015, the Appalachian Mountain Club's Mid-Atlantic Conservation Office has occupied a portion of the building, under a lease agreement with the City of Bethlehem. The building is maintained and its uses managed by the City of Bethlehem's Parks, Recreation & Public Properties Department.
