= Fountain Hill Opera House =

- Formerly listed on the U.S. National Register of Historic Places
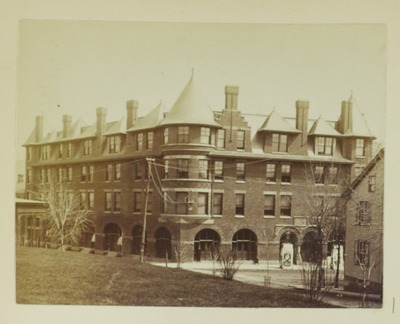
- Location: 405 Wyandotte St. Bethlehem, Pennsylvania
- Area: 0.3 acres (0.12 ha)
- Built: 1888
- NRHP reference No.: 79002306

Significant dates
- Added to NRHP: June 7, 1979
- Removed from NRHP: August 11, 1987

Fountain Hill Opera House, also known as the Globe Theatre and Grand Opera House, was a historic theater building located at Bethlehem, Northampton County, Pennsylvania. It was built in 1888, and has been demolished.

It was added to the National Register of Historic Places in 1979. It was destroyed by an arsonist on August 13, 1983. It was delisted in 1987, after it was demolished.
