= William Jacob Heller House =

Historic house in Pennsylvania, United States

- U.S. National Register of Historic Places
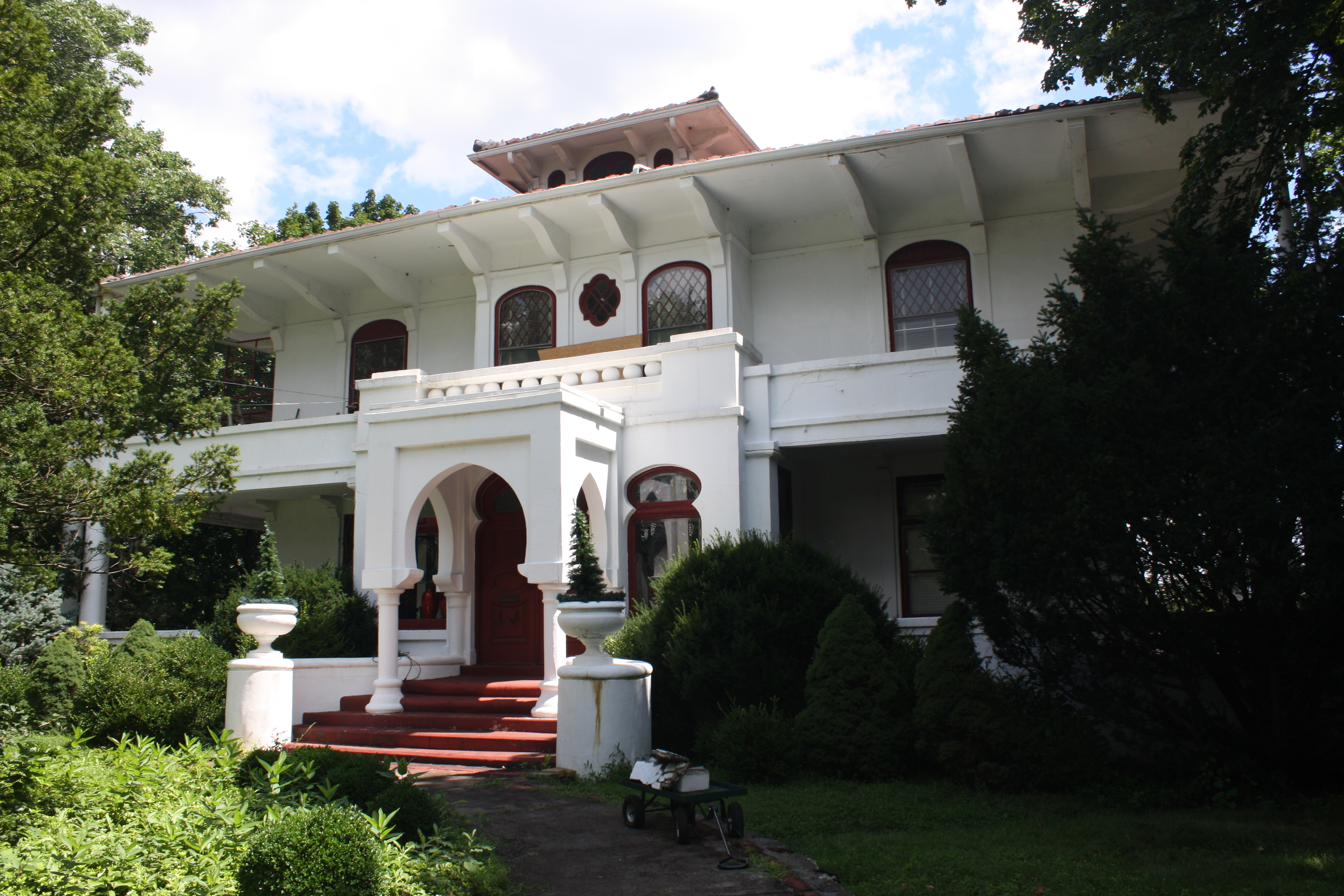
- William Jacob Heller House. August 2013.

- Location within Pennsylvania Location within the United States
- Location: 501 Mixsell St., Easton, Pennsylvania
- Coordinates: 40°42′14″N 75°12′5″W
- Area: 1.1 acres (0.45 ha)
- Architectural style: Art Nouveau
- NRHP reference No.: 82003803
- Added to NRHP: April 20, 1982

The William Jacob Heller House is an historic home that is located in Easton, Northampton County, Pennsylvania, United States.

It was added to the National Register of Historic Places in 1982.

== History and architectural features ==
Built circa 1900, this historic structure is an eclectic, three-story, Spanish Colonial Revival-style residence with stucco-coated concrete exterior walls. It features a gently sloping and widely projecting red clay tile roof.

The house was built by William Jacob Heller (1857-1920), who operated the first exclusive flag manufactory in the United States.
