= McCollum and Post Silk Mill =

- U.S. National Register of Historic Places
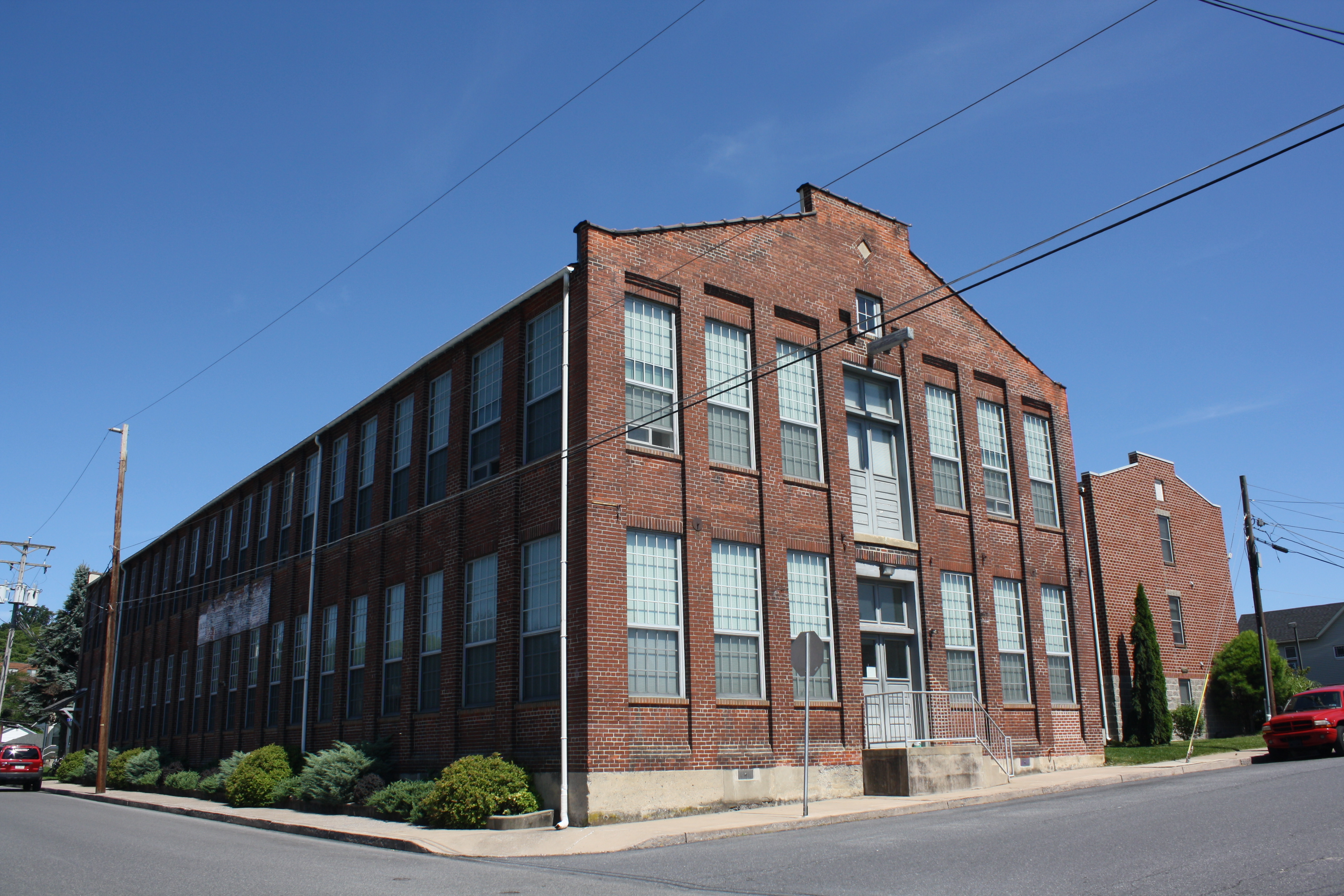
- McCollum and Post Silk Mill. August 2013.

- Location within Pennsylvania Location within the United States
- Location: 368 Madison Ave., Nazareth, Pennsylvania
- Coordinates: 40°44′21″N 75°19′8″W
- Area: less than one acre
- Architectural style: Early Commercial
- NRHP reference No.: 05000758
- Added to NRHP: July 27, 2005

McCollum and Post Silk Mill is a historic silk mill located at Nazareth, Northampton County, Pennsylvania. It was built in 1913, and is a two-story, rectangular brick industrial building measuring 51 feet, 6 inches, wide and 150 feet long. A one-story brick addition was built in 1967. In 2001, it was adapted for use as an apartment building. It housed a silk mill, and later clothing manufacturers, until its conversion.

It was added to the National Register of Historic Places in 2005.

== Gallery ==
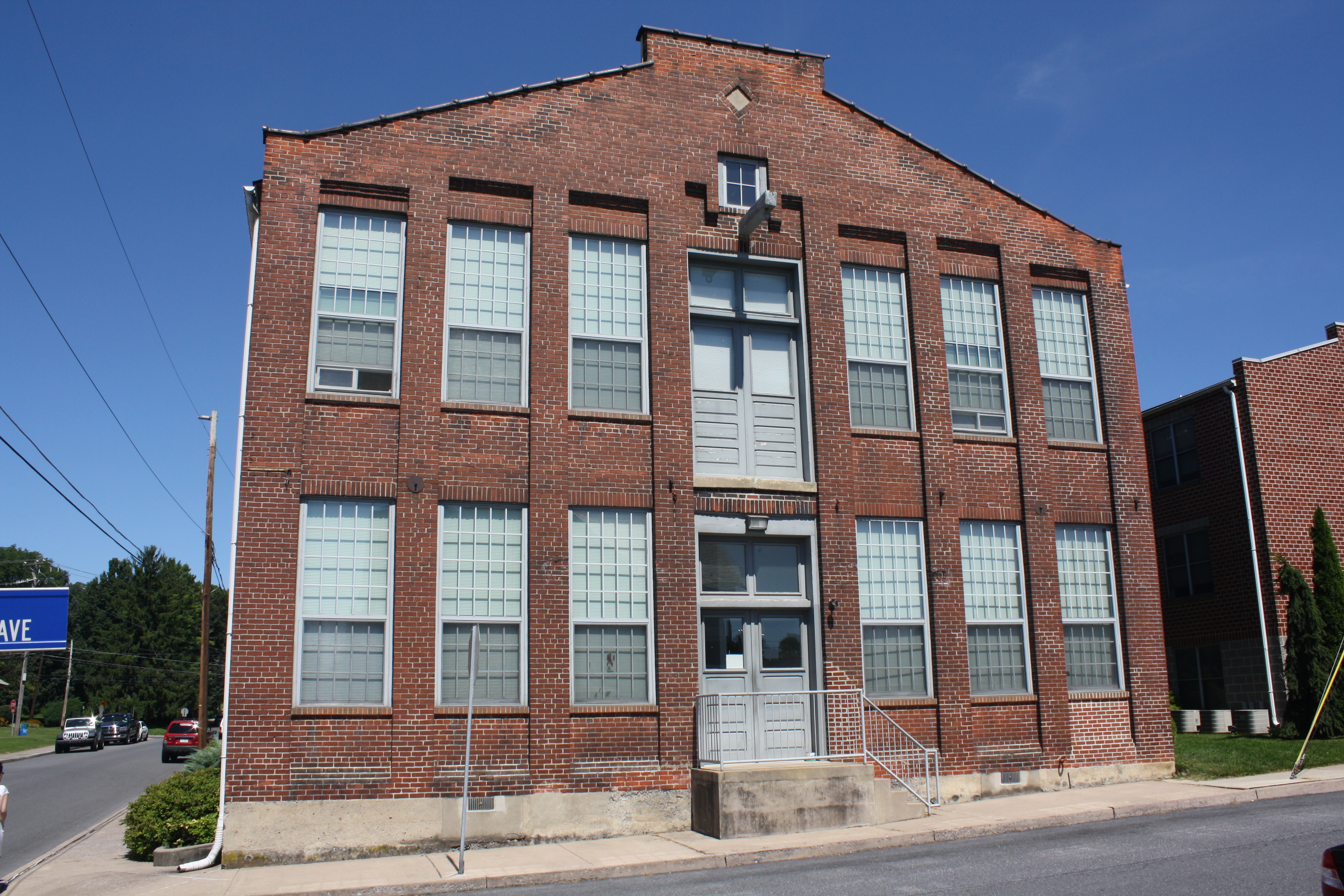

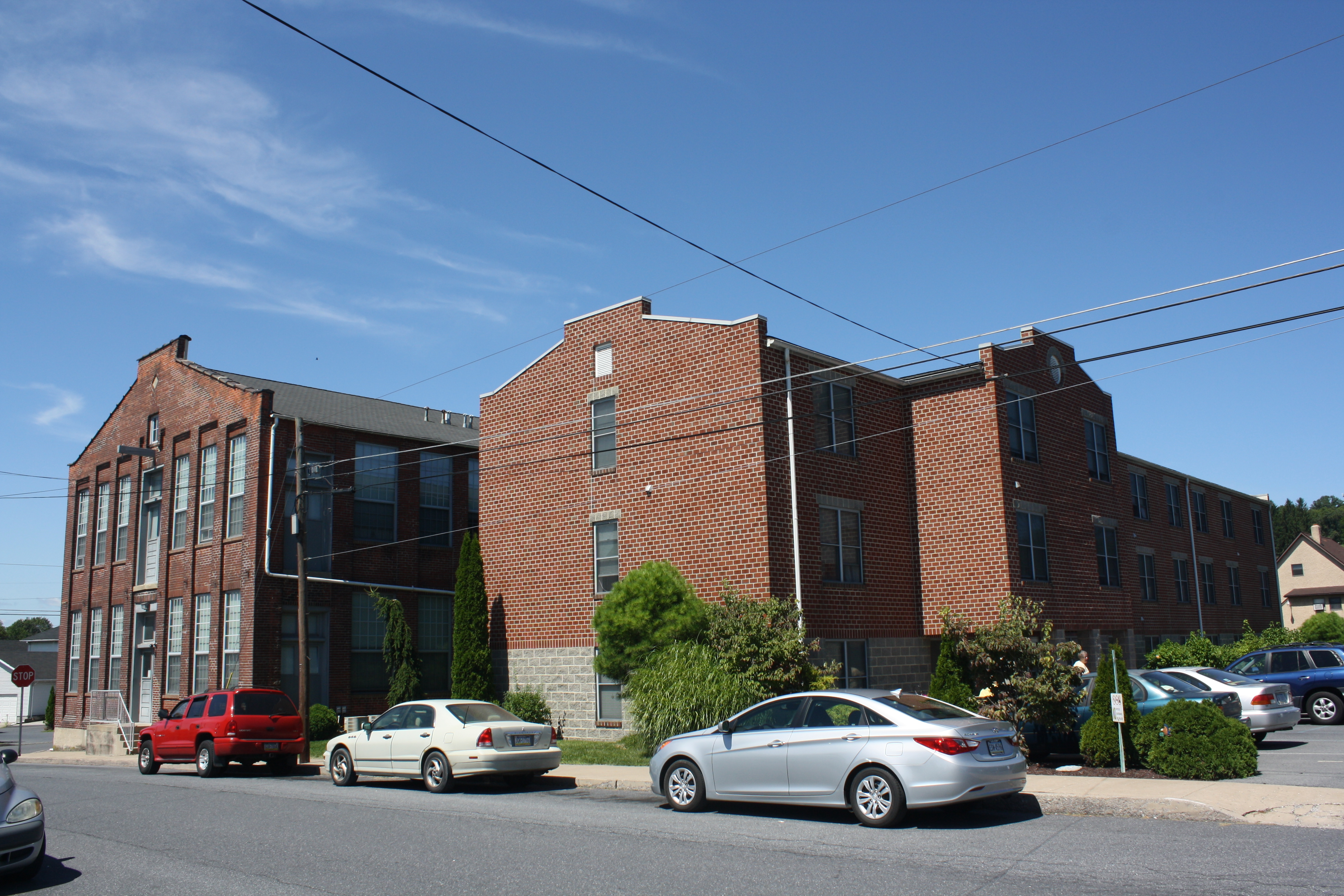

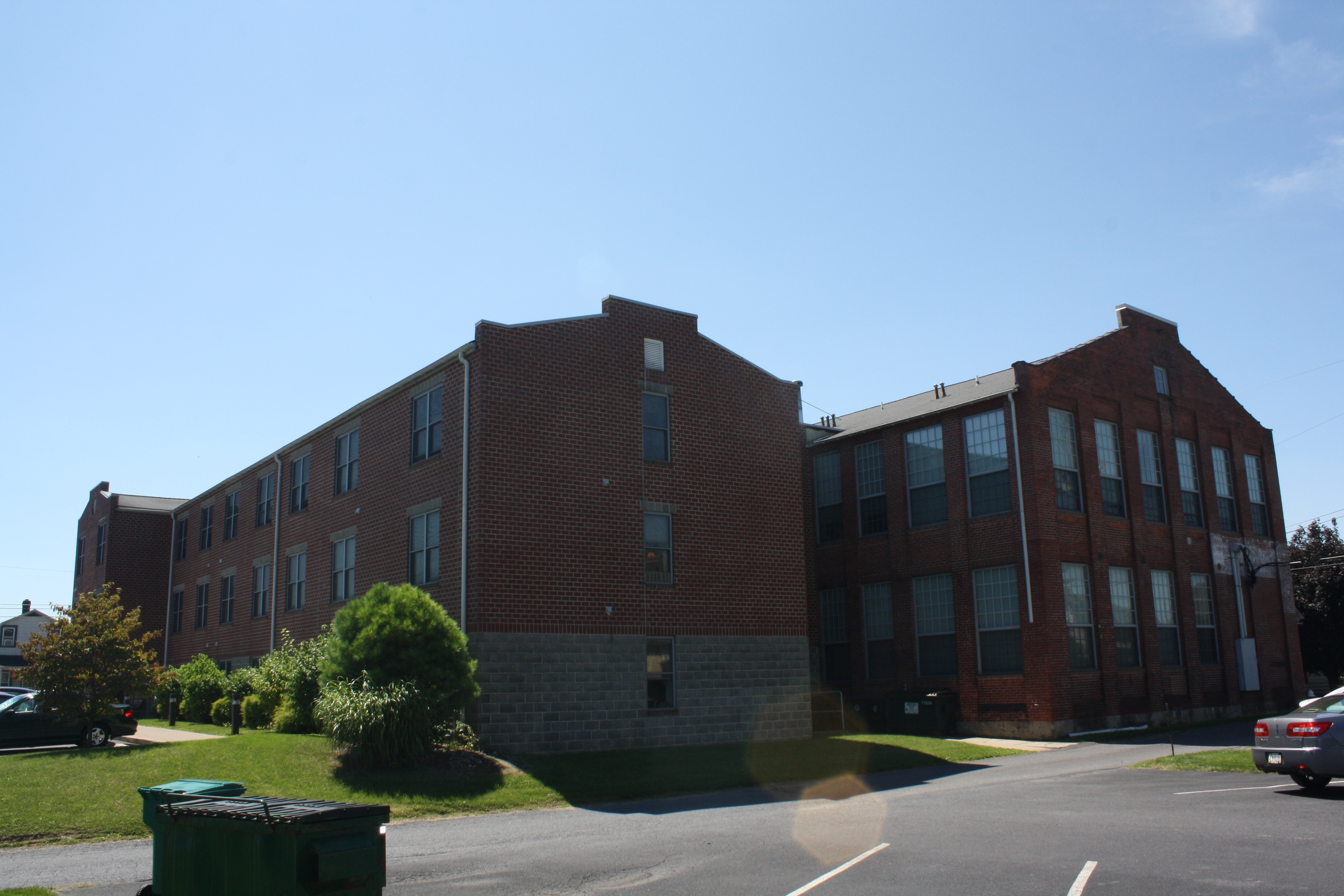

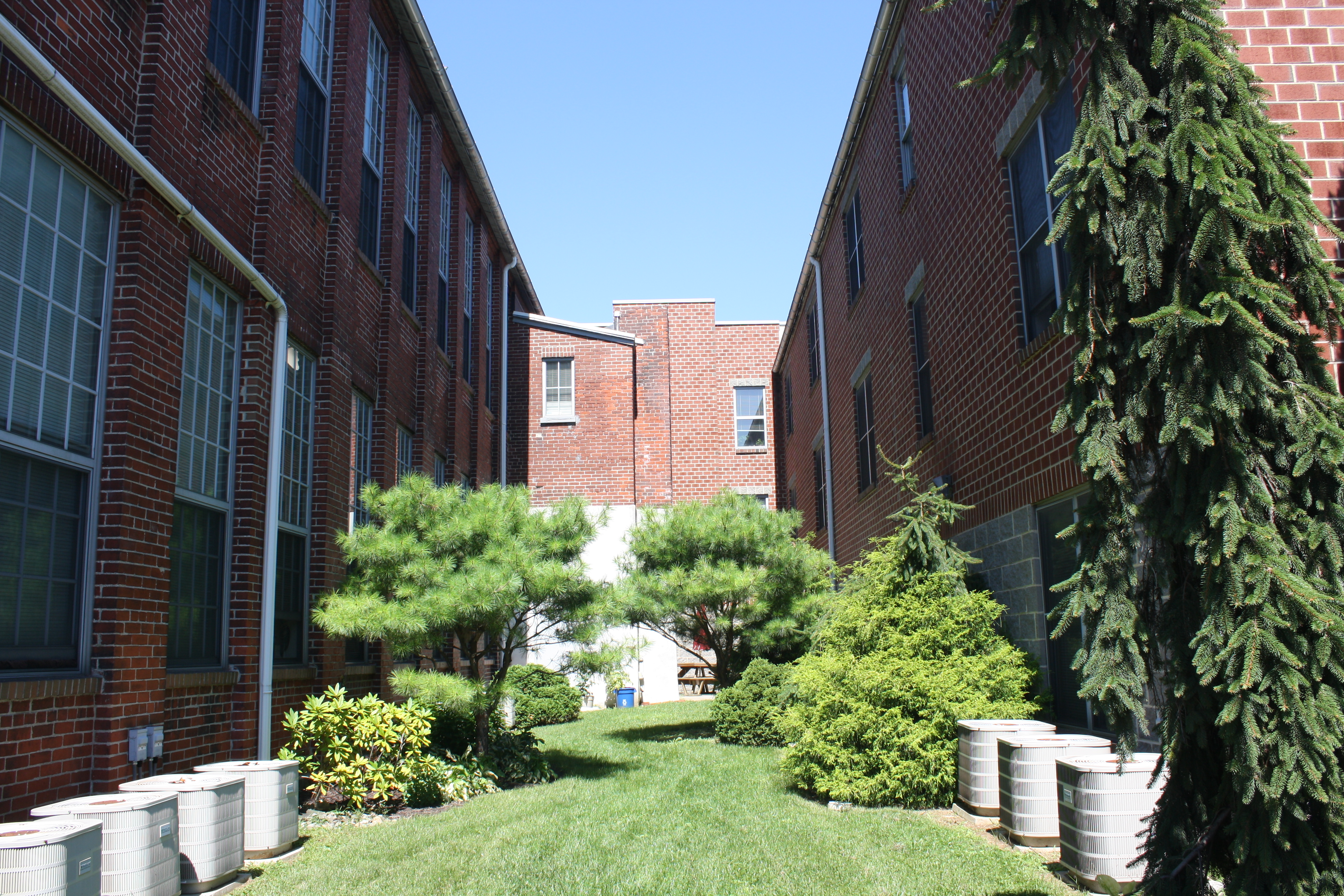
