= Lehigh Valley Railroad Headquarters Building =

- U.S. National Register of Historic Places
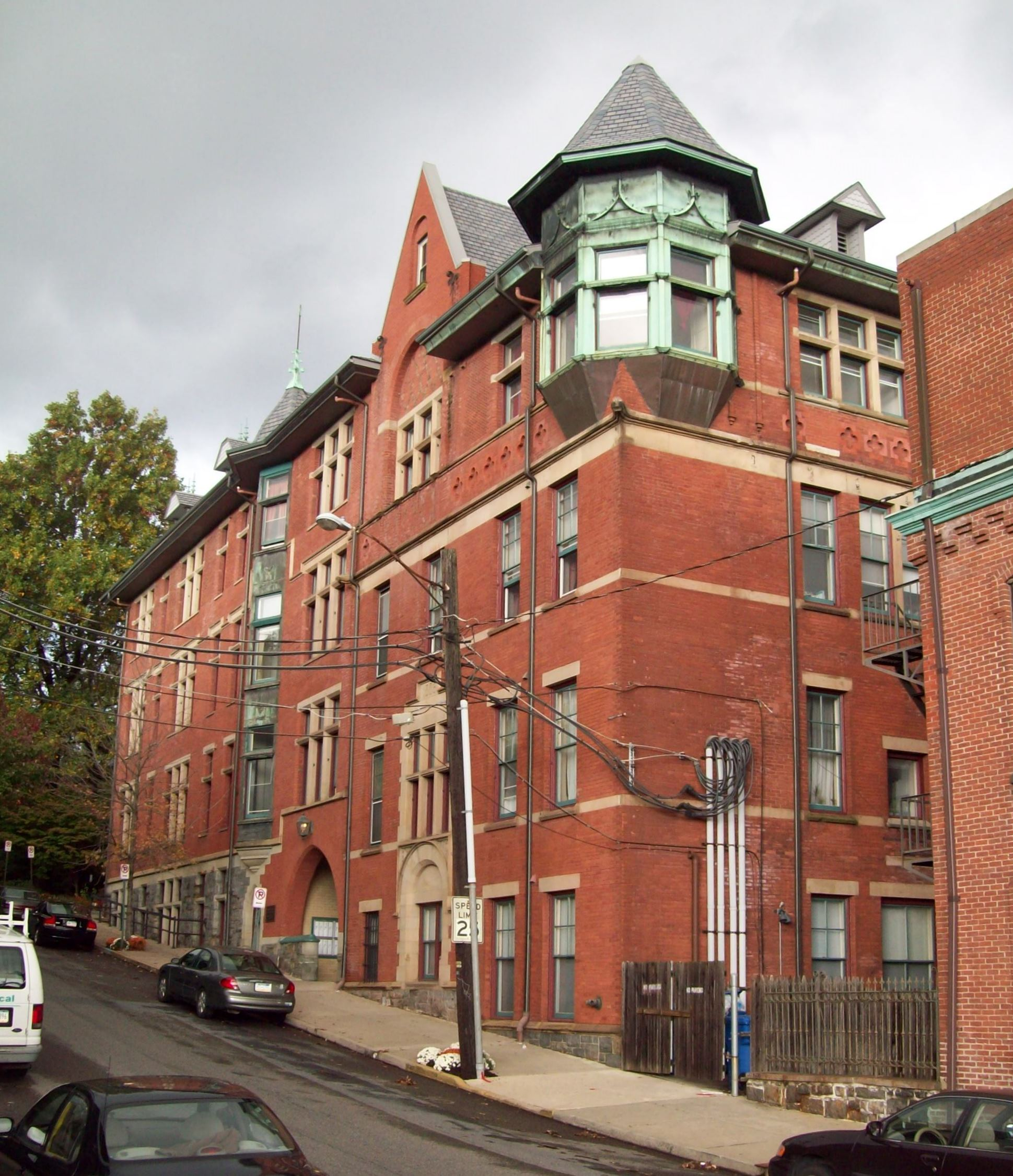
- Former Lehigh Valley Railroad Headquarters Building in October 2011

- Location within Pennsylvania Location within the United States
- Location: 425 Brighton St., Bethlehem, Pennsylvania, U.S.
- Coordinates: 40°36′48″N 75°23′7″W
- Area: 0.3 acres (0.12 ha)
- Built: 1885-1886, 1889-1890
- Architect: Robert Sayre
- Architectural style: Late Victorian Gothic, Queen Anne
- NRHP reference No.: 84003517
- Added to NRHP: May 24, 1984

The Lehigh Valley Railroad Headquarters Building, also known as the Conrail Building, is a historic office building in Bethlehem, Pennsylvania.

It was added to the National Register of Historic Places in 1984.

== History and architectural features ==
A red brick building set on a stone masonry base, this historic structure was built by the Lehigh Valley Railroad in two stages; the ground through third floors were constructed between 1885 and 1886, and the upper floors and western wing were added between 1889 and 1890. The building's style reflects Late Victorian Gothic and Queen Anne influences.

The main elevation features two copper bay windows at the corners, one three stories tall and the other one story tall. The former office building now houses apartments.
