= David Burke =

David Burke may refer to:

== Entertainment and literature ==
- David Burke (British actor) (1934–2026), British television actor
- David J. Burke (born 1948), American producer, screenwriter and film and television director
- David Burke (American actor) (born 1967), American television actor
- David Burke (author), writer on slang and idioms
- David Burke, author of a book on Melita Norwood
- D4vd (David Anthony Burke, born 2005), American singer and songwriter

== Sports ==
- Dave Burke (Australian footballer) (1916–1987), Australian rules footballer
- David Burke (Australian footballer, born 1959), Australian rules footballer
- David Burke (English footballer) (born 1960), English footballer
- David Burke (runner) (born 1968), competitor in the 1986 IAAF World Cross Country Championships – Junior men's race
- David Burke (boxer) (born 1975), English boxer
- David Burke (Kilkenny hurler) (born 1981), Irish hurler for Kilkenny and Wexford
- Davy Burke (born 1988), Irish Gaelic football manager and former player
- David Burke (Galway hurler) (born 1990), Irish hurler for Galway
- David Burke (American soccer), soccer player for Albany BWP Highlanders

== Others ==
- David Burke (botanist) (1854–1897), English botanist
- David W. Burke (1935–2014), American television news executive
- David Burke (neurophysiologist) (born 1944), Australian expert in spinal and brain trauma
- David A. Burke (1952–1987), American hijacker and former employee who caused the crash of Pacific Southwest Airlines Flight 1771
- David Burke (chef) (born 1962), chef and restaurateur
- David Burke (politician) (born 1967), member of the Ohio House of Representatives
- David "Bombhead" Burke, a character played by Lee Otway on the British TV soap opera Hollyoaks

== See also ==
- David Noel Bourke (born 1970), Irish filmmaker
- David Bourke (born 1976), Australian rules footballer
- David de Búrca, 16th-century Irish chieftain
