= Glendon =

Glendon may refer to:

== Places ==
- Glendon, Alberta, village in Alberta, Canada
- Glendon, Northamptonshire, deserted village in Northamptonshire, England
- Glendon, North Carolina, United States
- Glendon, Pennsylvania, borough in Northampton County, Pennsylvania, United States

== People ==
- George Glendon, English footballer
- J. Frank Glendon (1886–1937), American film actor
- Kevin Glendon (born 1961), English association footballer
- Martin Glendon (1877–1950), American baseball player
- Mary Ann Glendon (born 1938), American scholar and diplomat
- Pat Glendon (born 1894), Irish hurler
- William Glendon (c. 1920 – 2008), American attorney

== Others ==
- Glendon College, in Toronto, Ontario, Canada
