= Dick Tobin =

Irish hurler

Personal information
- Native name: Risteard Tóibín (Irish)
- Born: 3 January 1896 Urlingford, County Kilkenny, Ireland
- Died: 21 January 1957 (aged 61) New York City, United States

Sport
- Sport: Hurling
- Position: Right corner-forward
Club
- Years: Club
- 1913–1926: Emeralds
Club titles
- Kilkenny titles: 0
Inter-county
- Years: County
- 1916–1925: Kilkenny
Inter-county titles
- Leinster titles: 4
- All-Irelands: 1

Richard Tobin (3 January 1896 – 21 January 1957) was an Irish hurler who played as a right corner-forward for the Kilkenny senior team from 1916 until 1925.

Tobin made his first appearance for the team during the 1916 championship and became a regular player over the next decade. During that time he won one All-Ireland winner's medals and four Leinster winner's medals. He was later joined on the team by his brother Jimmy Tobin.

At club level Tobin played with the Emeralds club in Urlingford, however, he never won a county club championship|.
