= Emeralds GAA =

Junior Gaelic Athletic Association club

The Emeralds
- Na Smaragaidí
- Founded: 1972
- County: Kilkenny
- Colours: Green and white
- Grounds: Urlingford

Playing kits
Standard colours

Senior Club Championships
	All Ireland	Leinster champions	Kilkenny champions
Hurling:	0	0	0

Emeralds GAA is a junior Gaelic Athletic Association club located in Urlingford, County Kilkenny, Ireland. The club was founded in 1972 and almost exclusively fields teams in hurling. They spent 14 seasons in intermediate grade in Kilkenny before being relegated in 2015 back to the junior grade.

== History ==
In the early years of the 20th, century hurling was very strong in the parish of Urlingford with three teams competing. – Graine, Urlingford and Clomanto. Despite large competition, it was clear that a unified parish hurling team would provide a stronger and more capable force to compete against the larger parishes of the county.

The Emeralds club was formed in 1972 when both Clomanto and Urlingford united under the new name of Emeralds.

== Honours ==
- Kilkenny Junior Hurling Championship (3): 2001, 1905 (as Owen Ruas), 1947 (as Johnstown-Urlingford) (Runners-Up 1972, 1981, 1984, 1999)
- Leinster Junior Club Hurling Championship (0): (Runners-Up 2001)
- Kilkenny Senior Hurling Championship (0): (Runners-Up 1889 (as Graine), 1924 (as Clomanto), 1930 and 1931)(as Urlingford)
- Kilkenny Intermediate Hurling Championship (1): 1929 (as Urlingford) (Runners-Up 2013)
- All-Ireland Junior B Club Hurling Championship(0): (Runners-up 2008)
- Leinster Junior B Club Hurling Championship (1): 2008
- Kilkenny Under-21 B Hurling Championship (1): 2014
- Kilkenny Minor Hurling Championship (1): 2000
- Féile na nGael Division 3 (1): 2018

== Notable players ==
- Derek Lyng- winner of 2 All-Stars in 2002 and 2003 and played with Leinster winning Railway Cups
- Aidan "Taggy" Fogarty- 2006 All-Ireland senior hurling final "Man of the Match" and won Railway cups with Leinster
- David "Stoney" Burke- played with Wexford and Kilkenny senior hurling teams
- Conor Martin
- Killian Doyle- joint-captain of St.Kieran's who won the 2023 Croke Cup in Croke Park
- Pat Glendon
- Dick Tobin
- Jimmy Tobin
