= Raubsville, Pennsylvania =

Unincorporated community in Pennsylvania, US

- Census-designated place
- Village of Raubsville
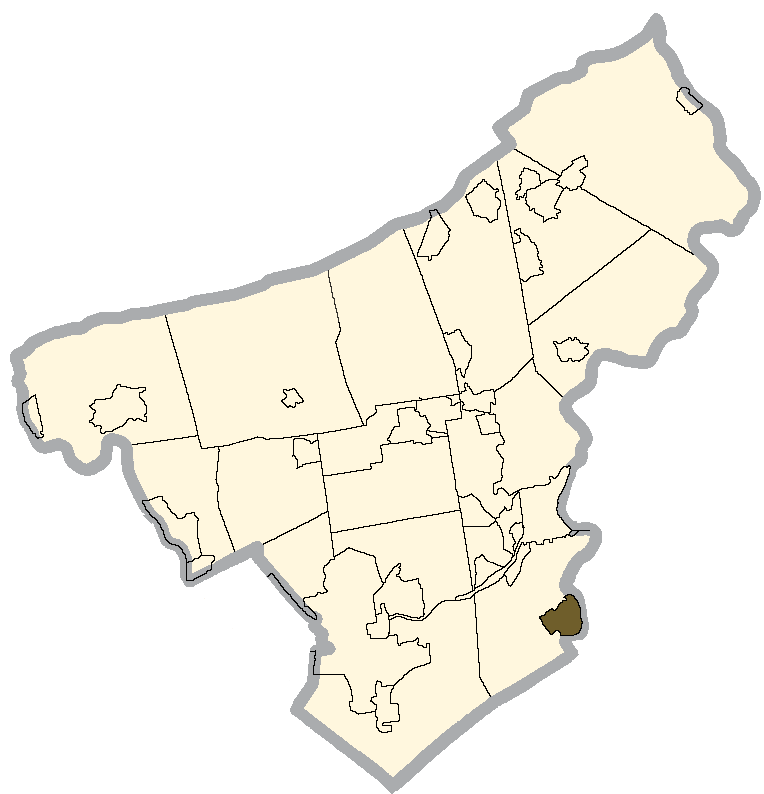
- Location of Raubsville in Northampton County, Pennsylvania

- Location of Raubsville in Pennsylvania Raubsville (the United States)
- Coordinates: 40°38′08″N 75°11′35″W
- Country: United States
- State: Pennsylvania
- County: Northampton
- Township: Williams

Area
  - Census-designated place: 1.70 sq mi (4.40 km^{2})
  - Land: 1.59 sq mi (4.12 km^{2})
  - Water: 0.11 sq mi (0.28 km^{2})

Population (2020)
  - Census-designated place: 1,079
  - Density: 678/sq mi (261.8/km^{2})
  - Metro: 865,310 (US: 68th)
- Time zone: UTC-5 (Eastern (EST))
  - Summer (DST): UTC-4 (EDT)
- ZIP Code: 18042
- Area codes: 610 and 484
- FIPS code: 42-63488

Raubsville is a census-designated place in Williams Township, Northampton County, Pennsylvania, United States. The population of Raubsville was 1,079 residents as of the 2020 census. Raubsville is located along PA Route 611 on the west bank of the Delaware River. It is part of the Lehigh Valley metropolitan area, which had a population of 861,899 and was the 68th-most populous metropolitan area in the U.S. as of the 2020 census.

Raubsville is served by the Wilson Area School District, and students in grade nine through 12 attend Wilson Area High School. Raubsville uses the Easton ZIP Code of 18042.

Historical population
Census	Pop.	Note	%±
2020	1,079		—
U.S. Decennial Census
