= Conor Martin =

Irish hurler (born 1994)

Personal information
- Native name: Conchur Máirtín (Irish)
- Born: 1994 (age 31–32) Urlingford, County Kilkenny, Ireland

Sport
- Sport: Hurling
- Position: Left corner-forward
Club
- Years: Club
- Emeralds
Club titles
- Kilkenny titles: 0
College
- Years: College
- University of Limerick
College titles
- Fitzgibbon titles: 1
Inter-county*
Years	County	Apps (scores)
2016-present	Kilkenny	0 (0-00)
Inter-county titles
- Leinster titles: 1
- All-Irelands: 0
- NHL: 1
- All Stars: 0
- *Inter County team apps and scores correct as of 21:09, 26 February 2018.

Conor Martin (born 1994) is an Irish hurler who plays as a left corner-forward for the Kilkenny senior team.

Born in Urlingford, County Kilkenny, Martin first played competitive hurling at juvenile and underage levels with the Emeralds club. He subsequently joined the club's senior team. He won a Fitzgibbon Cup medal in 2015 while playing with University of Limerick.

Martin made his debut on the inter-county scene at the age of sixteen when he was selected for the Kilkenny minor team. He had two championship seasons with the minor team. He subsequently joined the Kilkenny under-21 team, winning aa Leinster medal in 2012. Martin joined the senior team during the 2016 league and won a Leinster medal in his debut season.

== Honours ==
University of Limerick

- Fitzgibbon Cup (1): 2015

Kilkenny

- National Hurling League (1): 2018
- Leinster Senior Hurling Championship (1): 2016
- Leinster Under-21 Hurling Championship (1): 2012
