= Clomanto GAA =

Irish Gaelic Athletic Association club

Clomanto
- County: Kilkenny
- Grounds: Clomanto

Senior Club Championships
	All Ireland	Leinster champions	Kilkenny champions
Hurling:	0	0	0

Clomanto GAA was a Gaelic Athletic Association club located near Urlingford, County Kilkenny, Ireland. The club was primarily concerned with the game of hurling.

== History ==
Located in the Clomanto area, on the Kilkenny-Tipperary border, Clomanto operated at junior level for much of its existence. The club hosted a game against Freshford during the GAA's Gaelic Sunday series of events on 4 August 1918. Clomanto won the Northern Kilkenny JHC title in 1922, in what was their only victory in an adult final in any grade in the club's history. The club lost the subsequent Kilkenny JHC final to Clonmore. After a period of decline the club amalgamated with Urlingford under the new name of Emeralds in 1972.

== Honours ==
- Northern Kilkenny Junior Hurling Championship (1): 1922

== Notable players ==
- Bill Brennan: All-Ireland SHC-winner (1922)
- Pat Glendon: All-Ireland SHC-winner (1922)
