= Killian Doyle (Kilkenny hurler) =

Irish hurler

Personal information
- Native name: Cillian Ó Dúghaill (Irish)
- Born: 2004 (age 21–22) Urlingford, County Kilkenny, Ireland
- Occupation: Student

Sport
- Sport: Hurling
- Position: Midfield
Club
- Years: Club
- Emeralds
Club titles
- Kilkenny titles: 0
College
- Years: College
- 2023-present: University of Limerick
College titles
- Fitzgibbon titles: 1
Inter-county
- Years: County
- 2023-present: Kilkenny
Inter-county titles
- Leinster titles: 3
- All-Irelands: 0
- NHL: 0
- All Stars: 0

Killian Doyle (born 2004) is an Irish hurler. At club level, he plays with Emeralds and at inter-county level with the Kilkenny senior hurling team.

== Career ==
Doyle played hurling at all levels during his time as a student at St Kieran's College in Kilkenny. As joint-captain of the college's senior hurling team, he won an All-Ireland PPS SAHC after a 3–13 to 0–12 win over Presentation College, Athenry in the final. Doyle later studied at University of Limerick and won a Fitzgibbon Cup medal in 2025 after a 0–23 to 1–15 defeat of DCU Dóchas Éireann.

At club level, Doyle first played for Emeralds at juvenile and underage levels before progressing to adult level. He first played for Kilkenny as part of the minor team that won back-to-back Leinster MHC titles but lost the 2020 All-Ireland MHC final to Galway. Doyle immediately progressed to the under-20 team and was at midfield when Kilkenny beat Limerick by a point in the 2022 All-Ireland under-20 final.

Doyle was still a schoolboy when he made his senior team debut in a National Hurling League game against Tipperary in February 2023. He has since won three consecutive Leinster SHC medals.

== Honours ==
St Kieran's

- All-Ireland PPS Senior Hurling Championship: 2023 (c)

University of Limerick

- Fitzgibbon Cup: 2025

Kilkenny

- Leinster Senior Hurling Championship: 2023, 2024, 2025
- All-Ireland Under-20 Hurling Championship: 2022
- Leinster Under-20 Hurling Championship: 2022
- Leinster Minor Hurling Championship: 2020, 2021
