= Jeff Fisher (author) =

Jeff Fisher (born September 5, 1960) is an author, sports journalist, and play-by-play announcer who co-founded High School Football America, a digital media sports company, in 2004. On September 4, 2018, Skyhorse Publishing released Fisher's first book High School Football in Texas – Amazing Football Stories From the Greatest Players of Texas, which features one-on-one interviews with nearly 50 past and present National Football League players, including nine who are currently enshrined in the Pro Football Hall of Fame, in which they discuss their favorite memories of playing high school football in Texas.

== Early life and education ==
Fisher attended and graduated from Wilson Area High School in Easton, Pennsylvania in the Lehigh Valley region of eastern Pennsylvania.

== Career ==
At age 14, Fisher began his broadcasting career, working as a spotter and statistician at high school football game broadcasts on WEST Radio in Easton, Pennsylvania. In 1993, he transitioned into television, working at WFMZ-TV in Allentown, Pennsylvania. In 1997, he was appointed WFMZ's sports director. During his time at the station, he created The Big Ticket, which in 2000 was named the Best Television Sportscast in Pennsylvania by the Associated Press. Fisher also served as hosted Lehigh University Sports Forum television show. From 1996 until 2000, he was the play-by-play announcer for Lehigh University's men's basketball team. He also was the station's play-by-play host for its broadcasts of the Allentown Ambassadors, a professional baseball team in the Northern League.

In 2000, Fisher left WFMZ-TV to become sports anchor and reporter at FOX Sports Net in Chicago, where he worked on the network's shows that were broadcast in Chicago, Ohio, and San Francisco.

In 2004, along with fellow journalist Trish Hoffman, Fisher launched High School Football America in Chicago. In 2012, Fisher moved High School Football America to Los Angeles to launch its radio show, "High School Football America SoCal". on AM 570 FOX Sports Radio.

== Book ==
Fisher's book, High School Football in Texas – Amazing Football Stories From the Greatest Players of Texas, includes his interviews with players about their favorite high school football memories. In addition to the players, Fisher also interviewed coaches, parents, and fans about the players he featured.

Players featured include:

- Chapter 1 - Raymond Berry
- Chapter 2 - Bill Bradley
- Chapter 3 - Drew Brees
- Chapter 4 - Earl Campbell
- Chapter 5 - Andy Dalton
- Chapter 6 - Eric Dickerson
- Chapter 7 - Derwin Gray
- Chapter 8 - Joe Greene
- Chapter 9 - Ken Houston
- Chapter 10 - Craig James (running back)
- Chapter 11 - Bob Lilly
- Chapter 12 - Andrew Luck
- Chapter 13 - Don Maynard
- Chapter 14 - Mike Singletary
- Chapter 15 - Lovie Smith
- Chapter 16 - LaDainian Tomlinson
- Chapter 17 - Elmo Wright

== High School Football America ==
High School Football America, also known as HSFA, tells the story of America through the lens of high school football. HSFA is best known for its storytelling and national, regional, and state rankings.

Since 2012, HSFA has been part of the High School Football National Championship conversation. The company began crowning national champs in 2012 with an opinion poll. In 2013, HSFA switched to naming its national champ using a proprietary algorithm created by Fisher.
