= Isaac Stout House =

Historic house in Pennsylvania, United States

- U.S. National Register of Historic Places
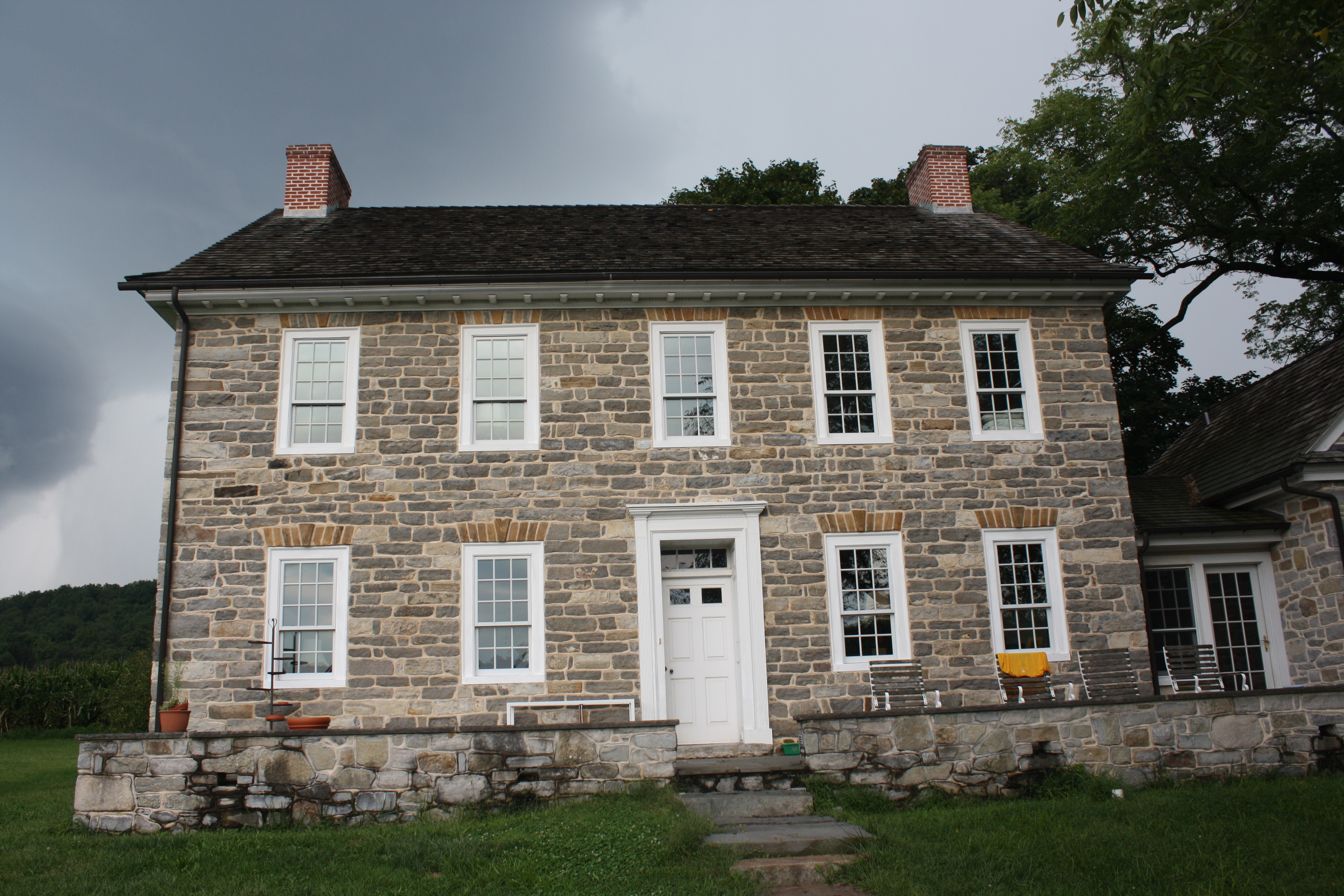
- Isaac Stout House. September 2013.

- Location within Pennsylvania Location within the United States
- Location: 50 Durham Rd., Williams Township, Pennsylvania
- Coordinates: 40°36′37″N 75°13′59″W
- Area: less than one acre
- Built: 1772
- Architectural style: Georgian
- NRHP reference No.: 04000834
- Added to NRHP: August 11, 2004

The Isaac Stout House is an historic home which is located in Williams Township, Northampton County, Pennsylvania.

It was added to the National Register of Historic Places in 2004.

== History and architectural features ==
The original section of the house was built circa 1772, and is a 2 1/2-story, five-bay by two-bay stone structure, which was designed in the Georgian style. The original section measures approximately forty feet wide and thirty feet deep. The interior has a center hall plan and has Federal style details. An addition was completed in 2001. Also located on the property are the ruins of a nineteenth-century bank barn and stone and stucco-faced silo.
