= Wilson, Pennsylvania =

Borough in Pennsylvania, US

Borough of Wilson Wilson
- Borough
- Seal

- Location of Wilson in Northampton County, Pennsylvania (left) and of Northampton County in Pennsylvania (right)

- Location of Wilson in Pennsylvania Wilson (the United States)
- Coordinates: 40°41′05″N 75°14′23″W
- Country: United States
- State: Pennsylvania
- County: Northampton
- Formed as a township: Feb. 10, 1913
- Incorporated as a borough: July 12, 1920
- Named after: Woodrow Wilson

Government
  - Mayor: Donald R Barrett, Jr.

Area
  - Borough: 1.16 sq mi (3.00 km^{2})
  - Land: 1.15 sq mi (2.99 km^{2})
  - Water: 0.0039 sq mi (0.01 km^{2})
- Elevation: 394 ft (120 m)

Population (2020)
  - Borough: 8,259
  - Density: 7,149/sq mi (2,760.1/km^{2})
  - Metro: 865,310 (US: 68th)
- Time zone: UTC-5 (EST)
  - Summer (DST): UTC-4 (EDT)
- ZIP Code: 18042
- Area codes: 610 and 484
- FIPS code: 42-85592
- Primary airport: Lehigh Valley International Airport
- School district: Wilson Area
- Website: Wilson Borough

Wilson is a borough in Northampton County, Pennsylvania, United States. The population was 8,259 at the 2020 census. Wilson is located adjacent to the city of Easton and is part of the Lehigh Valley metropolitan area, which had a population of 861,899 and was the 68th-most populous metropolitan area in the U.S. as of the 2020 census.

== Geography ==
There is more than one Wilson in Pennsylvania. This borough is in the far east of Pennsylvania, in Northampton County; there is a neighborhood named Wilson in Clairton, south of Pittsburgh in Allegheny County, and another in Clarion County. Wilson is located at 40°41′5″N 75°14′23″W (40.684648, -75.239626). According to the U.S. Census Bureau, the borough has a total area of 1.2 square miles (3.1 km^{2}), of which 1.2 square miles (3.1 km^{2}) is land and 0.80% is water.

== History ==
Page 99 of a Wilson Township organizational meeting in 1914

Wilson Borough is named after former U.S. President Woodrow Wilson. First formed as a township on February 10, 1913 during the first half of 1920, a number of property owners solicited the courts to change the form of government from a township to that of a borough.

According to the 1920 book, History of the Northampton County (Pennsylvania) and the Grand Valley of Lehigh, by the American Historical Association, supervised and revised by William J. Heller, the township was consummated by the courts in 1914, but the court case of Palmer School District v. Wilson School District indicates the township's formation occurred on February 10, 1913.

There are two very early court cases soon after the creation of the new township in 1913. The first, Palmer School District v. Wilson School District, related to Wilson owing Palmer for a certain amount of indebtedness caused by the township's creation. The second, Township of Wilson v. Easton Transit Co. in 1916, related to Wilson officials suing the transit company for performing work without first obtaining necessary permissions. The township lost this case, but in an appeal to Supreme Court of Pennsylvania on May 22, 1917, then Pennsylvania Supreme Court Justice Walling ruled, "The assignments of error are overruled and the decree is affirmed at the cost of the appellant."

== Demographics ==
Historical population
| Census | Pop. | Note | %± |
|---|---|---|---|
| 1920 | 5,196 | | — |
| 1930 | 8,265 | | 59.1% |
| 1940 | 8,217 | | −0.6% |
| 1950 | 8,159 | | −0.7% |
| 1960 | 8,465 | | 3.8% |
| 1970 | 8,406 | | −0.7% |
| 1980 | 7,564 | | −10.0% |
| 1990 | 7,830 | | 3.5% |
| 2000 | 7,682 | | −1.9% |
| 2010 | 7,896 | | 2.8% |
| 2020 | 8,259 | | 4.6% |
U.S. Decennial Census

At the 2010 census, there were 7,896 people living in the borough. The racial makeup of the borough was 84.1% White, 6.5% African American, 0.2% Native American, 2.1% Asian, 0.0% Pacific Islander, 3.0% from other races, and 4.1% from two or more races. Hispanic or Latino of any race were 10.6% of the population.

== Transportation ==
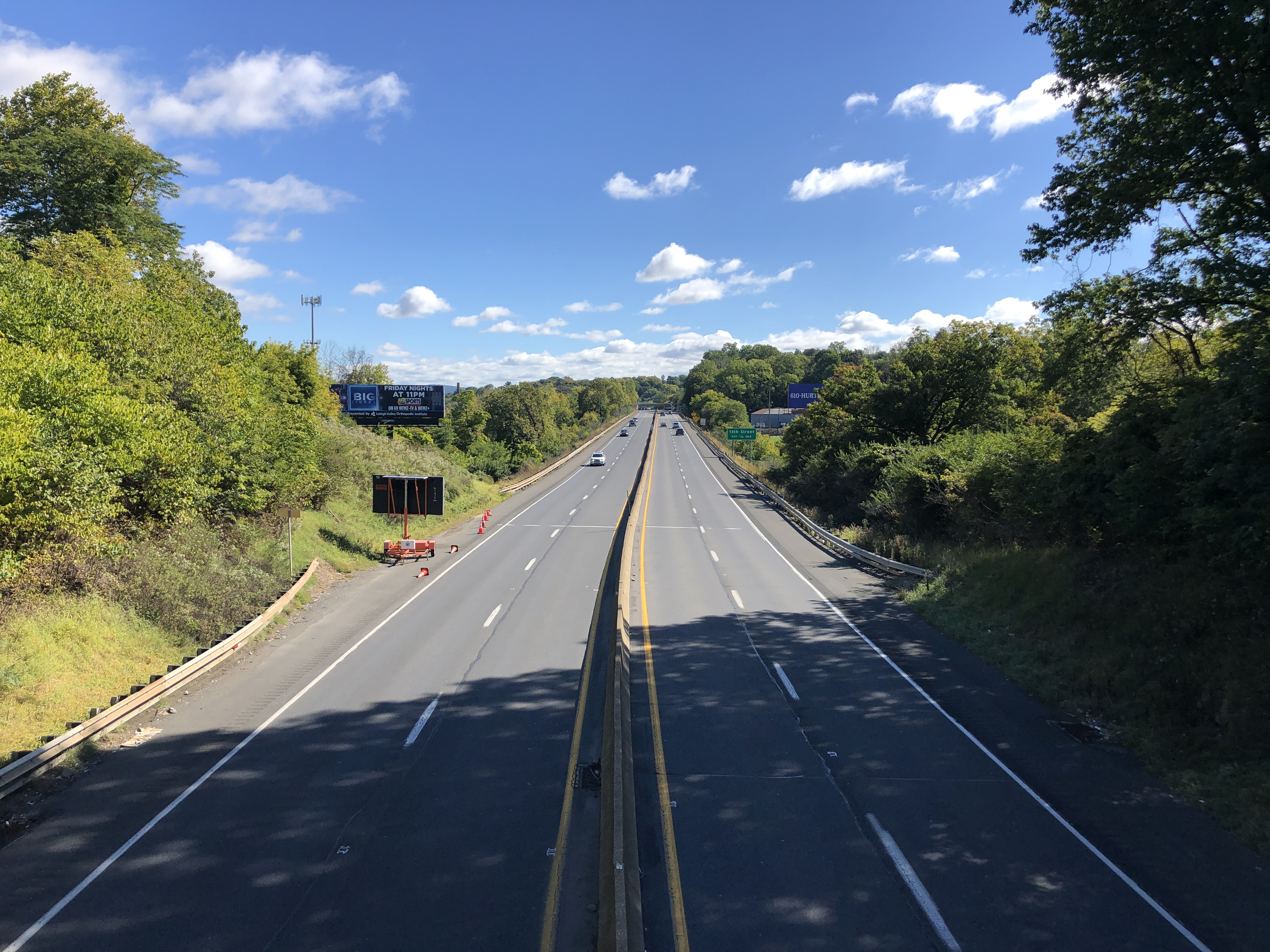
US 22 East in Wilson

As of 2010, there were 19.96 miles (32.12 km) of public roads in Wilson, of which 5.08 miles (8.18 km) were maintained by the Pennsylvania Department of Transportation (PennDOT) and 14.88 miles (23.95 km) were maintained by the borough.

U.S. Route 22 and Pennsylvania Route 248 are the numbered highways passing through Wilson. US 22 follows the Lehigh Valley Thruway along a southwest-northeast alignment along the western and northern edges of the borough, with an interchange with PA 248 located just west of the borough in Palmer Township. PA 248 follows Northampton Street along an east-west alignment through the center of the borough.

== Education ==
The borough is served by the Wilson Area School District. Students in grades nine through 12 attend Wilson Area High School in the borough.
