= Coffeetown Grist Mill =

- U.S. National Register of Historic Places
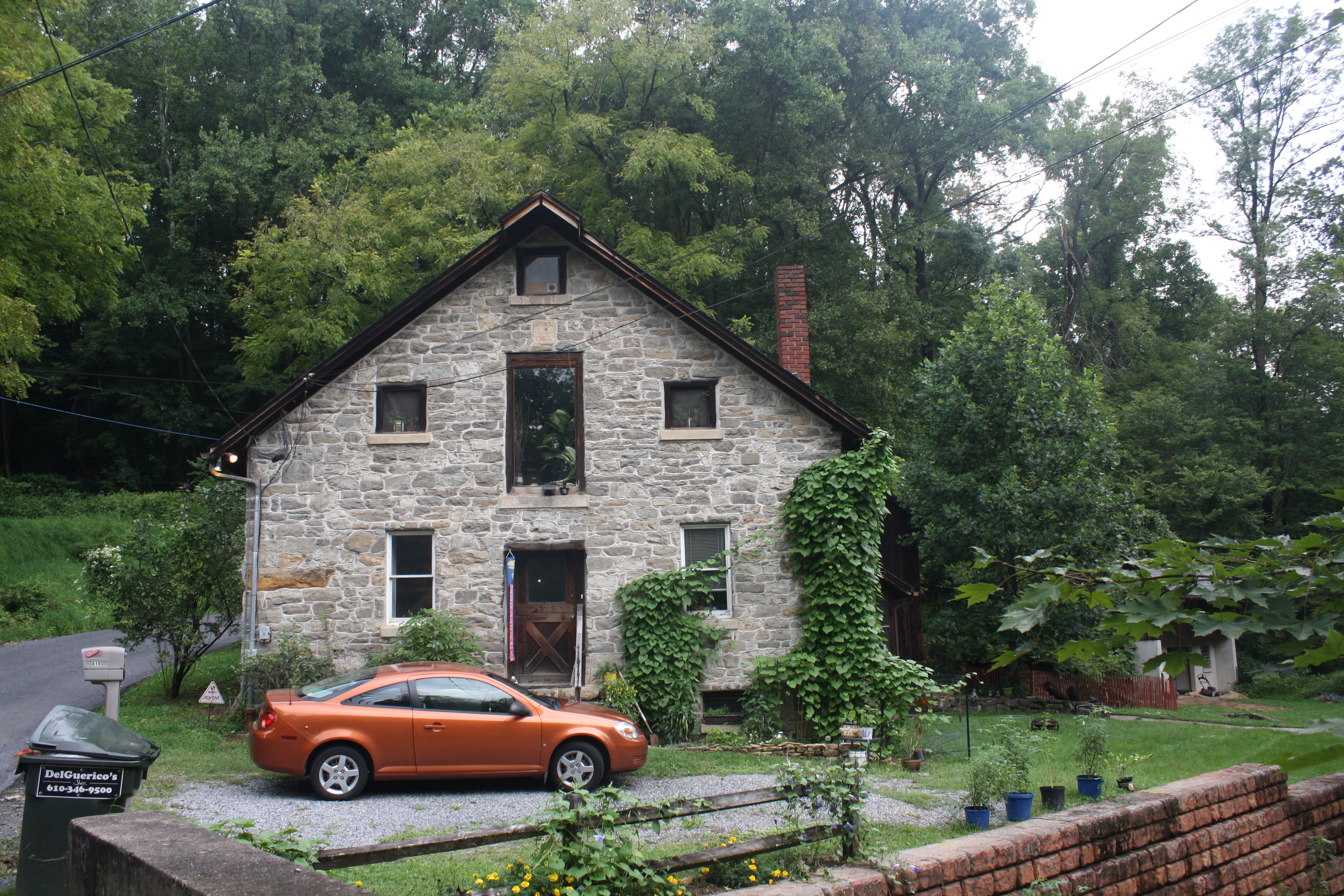
- Coffeetown Grist Mill, September 2013

- Location within Pennsylvania Location within the United States
- Location: 7 miles (11 km) south of Easton at Coffeetown and Kressman Roads, Williams Township, Pennsylvania
- Coordinates: 40°37′09.7″N 75°12′29.3″W
- Area: 1 acre (0.40 ha)
- Built: 1762
- Architectural style: Banked mill
- NRHP reference No.: 77001179
- Added to NRHP: November 16, 1977

Coffeetown Grist Mill is a historic grist mill located at Williams Township, Northampton County, Pennsylvania. It was built in 1762, and is a banked building measuring 2 1/2 stories high on the banked side. The building measures 36 feet by 50 feet, and assumed its present size with additions made in the 19th century. The mill was converted to a fertilizer factory in the 1920s. The building was also used as a temporary schoolhouse and post office. The building is now a private residence.

It was added to the National Register of Historic Places in 1977.

== Gallery ==
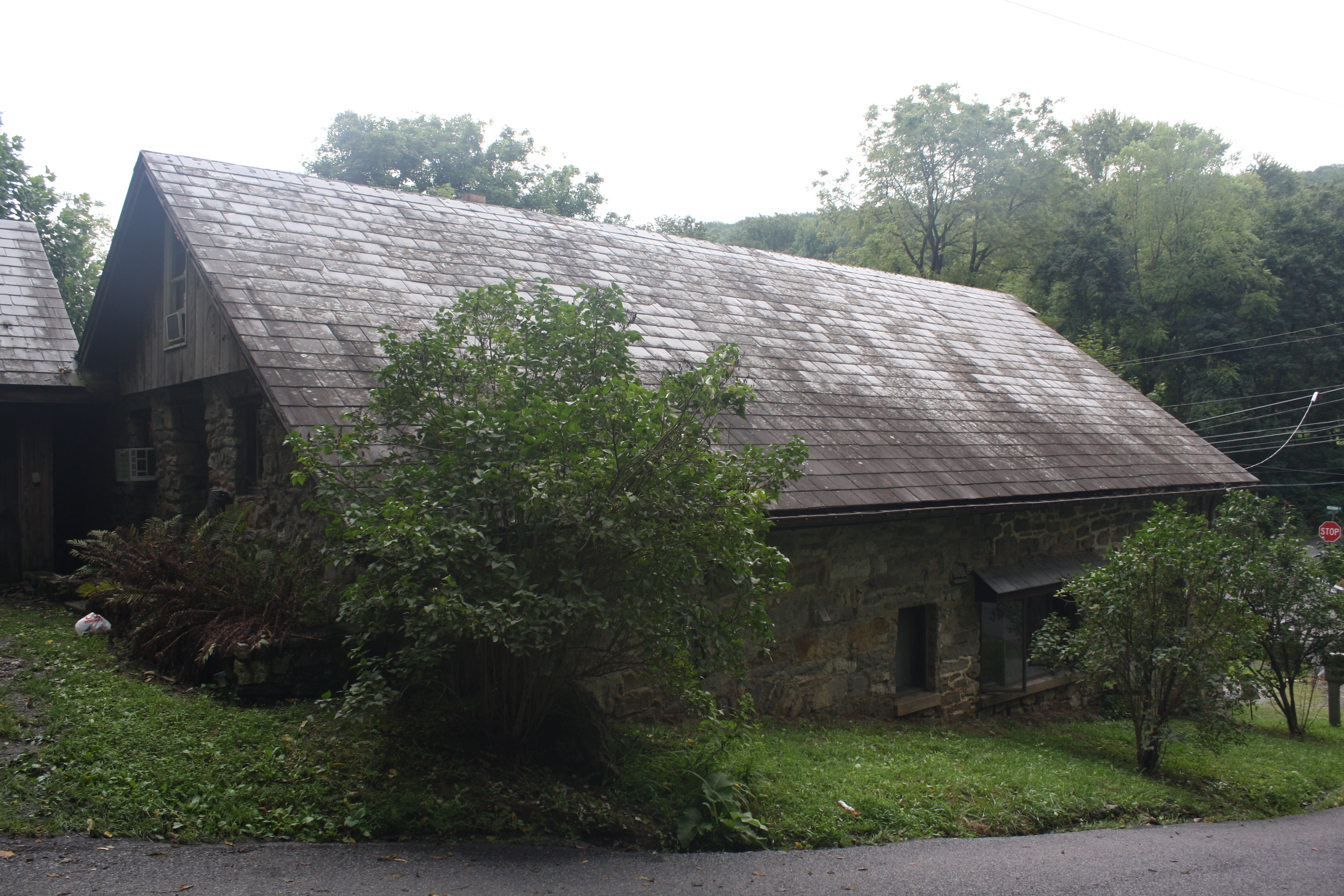
Grist Mill

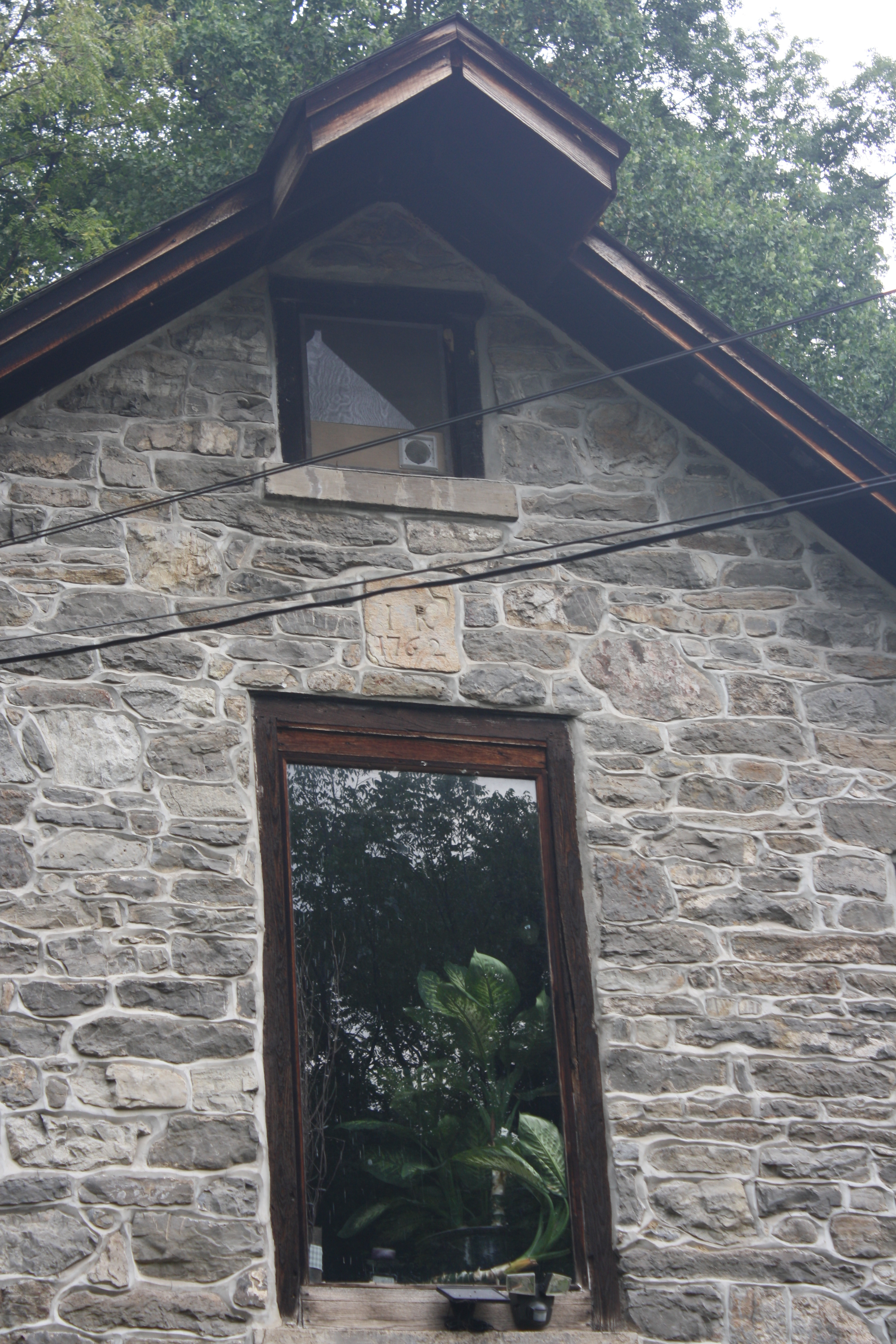
Southern side with signed stone "I.R. 1762"

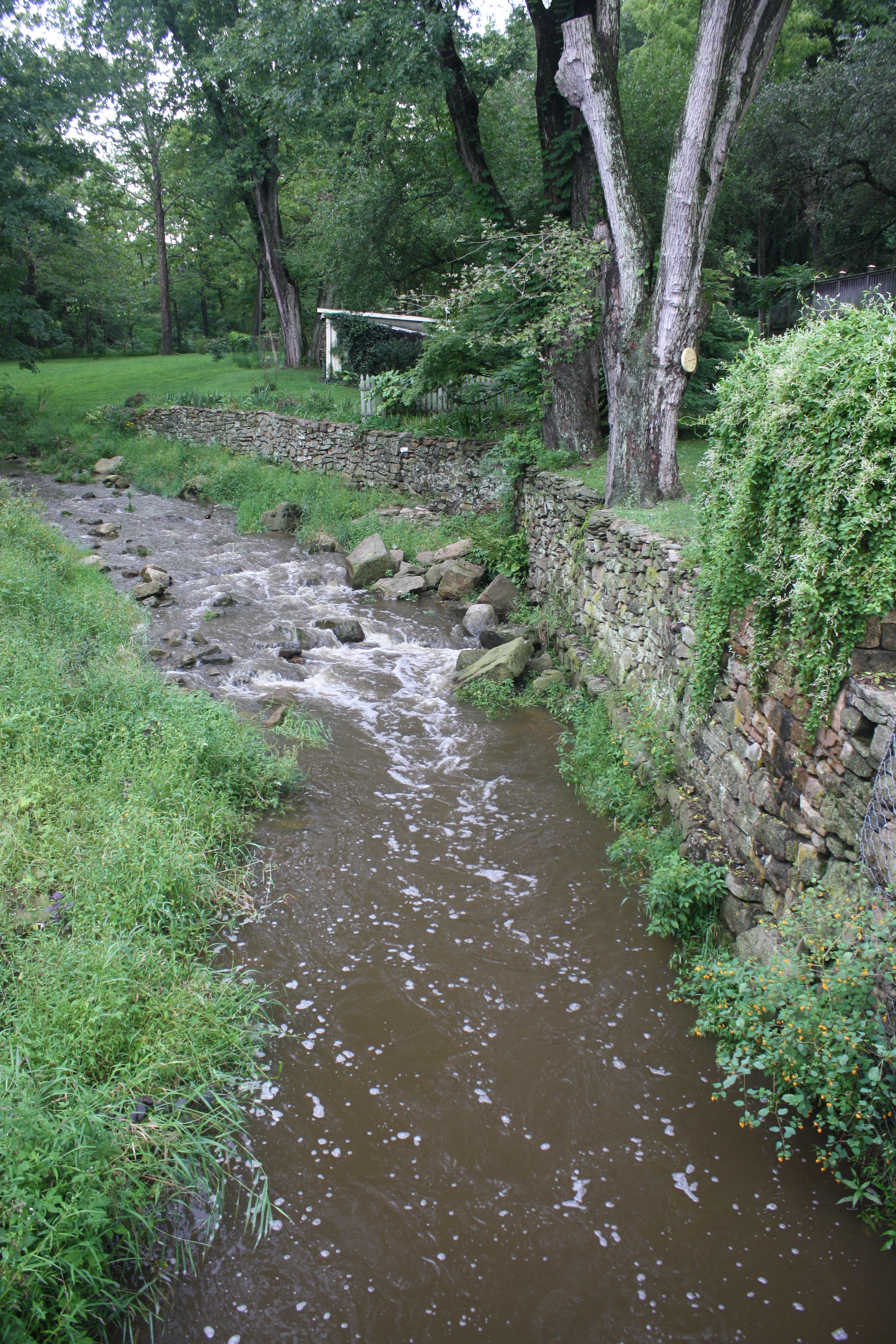
Frey's Run near Coffeetown Grist Mill
