= Bridge in Williams Township =

- U.S. National Register of Historic Places
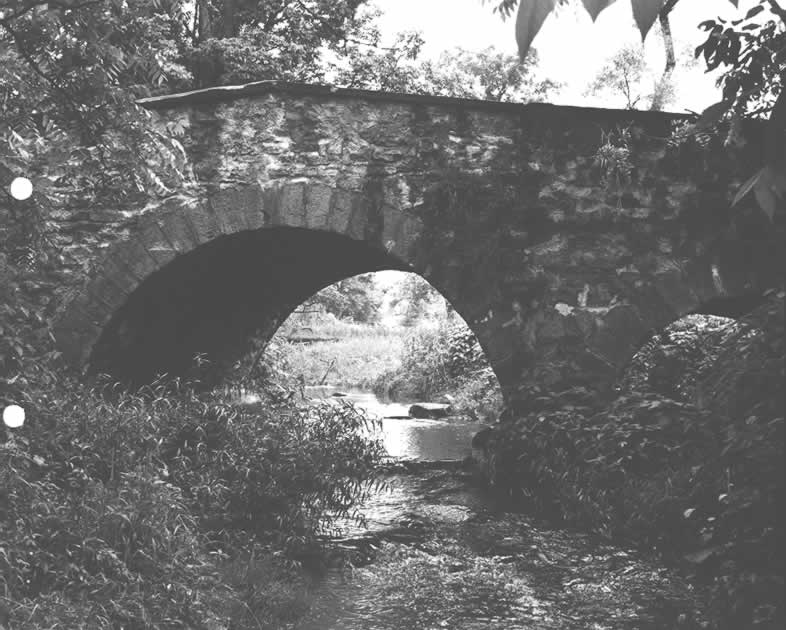
- Bridge in Williams Township in 1982

- Location within Pennsylvania Location within the United States
- Location: Legislative Route 48007 over Frey's Run near Stouts, Williams Township, Pennsylvania
- Coordinates: 40°36′39″N 75°13′54″W
- Area: less than one acre
- Built: 1857
- Architectural style: Multi-span camelback arch
- MPS: Highway Bridges Owned by the Commonwealth of Pennsylvania, Department of Transportation TR
- NRHP reference No.: 88000855
- Added to NRHP: June 22, 1988

Bridge in Williams Township is a historic stone arch bridge spanning Frey's Run at Williams Township, Northampton County, Pennsylvania. It was built in 1857, and is a triple-span, camelback shaped bridge. The bridge property measures 80 feet long and 25 feet wide, and each semi-circular arch measures 15 feet wide and 10 feet long.

It was added to the National Register of Historic Places in 1988.
