= Jacob Arndt House and Barn =

Historic house in Pennsylvania, United States

- U.S. National Register of Historic Places
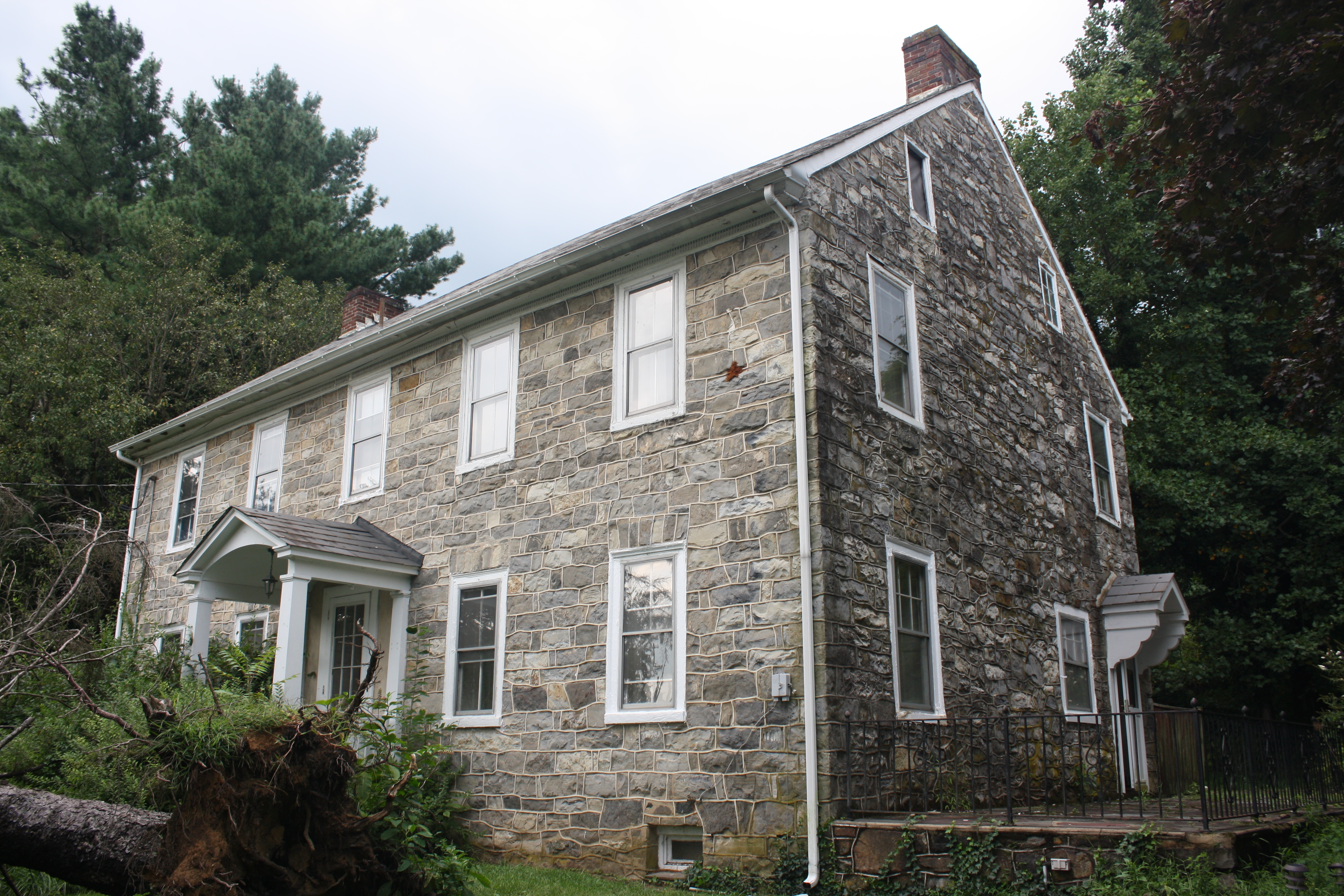
- Jacob Arndt House. September 2013.

- Location within Pennsylvania Location within the United States
- Location: 910 Raubsville Rd., Williams Township, Pennsylvania
- Coordinates: 40°37′35″N 75°13′22″W
- Area: less than one acre
- Architectural style: Federal
- NRHP reference No.: 05001489
- Added to NRHP: December 28, 2005

The Jacob Arndt House and Barn is a historic home and Pennsylvania barn located at 910 Raubsville Road in Williams Township, Northampton County, Pennsylvania. The land on which the home sits was inherited by Jacob Arndt from his father, Abraham, in 1795.

The home, which was begun in the Federal architecture style circa 1810, overlooks the township's Stouts Valley, and was completed sometime around 1840, the same year in which the barn was erected. This property was added to the National Register of Historic Places in 2005.

== History and architectural features ==
The land on which this historic complex sits was inherited by Jacob Arndt from his father, Abraham, in 1795. The complex encompasses a Federal architecture-style limestone house built sometime around 1810 with an addition which was completed circa 1840. The large stone and wood Pennsylvania barn was also built circa 1840. In addition, a stone carriage house built was erected sometime around 1890. The house features an entrance portico with an elliptical pediment, slate covered gable roof, and two gable-end brick chimneys. The ruins of an out kitchen built sometime around 1810 also remain visible.

According to historic preservation specialist David Kimmerly, who prepared the nomination form to secure placement of this historic property on the National Register of Historic Places, the "walls of the house are constructed of regularly coursed limestone with ribbon pointing," which is "similar to pointing on the c. 1900 retaining wall reflecting 20th century Colonial Revival period influence." The main facade's first floor windows were built with stone jack arches with keystones, a design which is frequently found in Federal architecture.

=== Placement of the property on the National Register of Historic Places ===
The nomination form to secure placement of the Jacob Arndt House and its associated buildings on the National Register of Historic Places was completed in November 2004 by David Kimmerly, a historic preservation specialist with Heritage Conservancy in Doylestown, Pennsylvania on behalf of the home's owner at that time, John E. Melchor. The property's National Register materials were then reviewed on September 13, 2005, by Pennsylvania's Historic Preservation Board at its meeting at 9:45 a.m. in Room 515 of the Pennsylvania Historical and Museum Commission at Third and North Streets in Harrisburg. Also being considered for National Register status that day were the Germantown Grammar School Number 2 (boundary increase) in Philadelphia, the Chickies Historic District in Lancaster County, the Allentown Bank Building on North Seventh Street in Allentown, the South Bethlehem Historic District in Bethlehem, and the Seville Theater in Montgomery County.

The Jacob Arndt House and its associated buildings were then officially added to the National Register of Historic Places later in 2005.

== Gallery ==
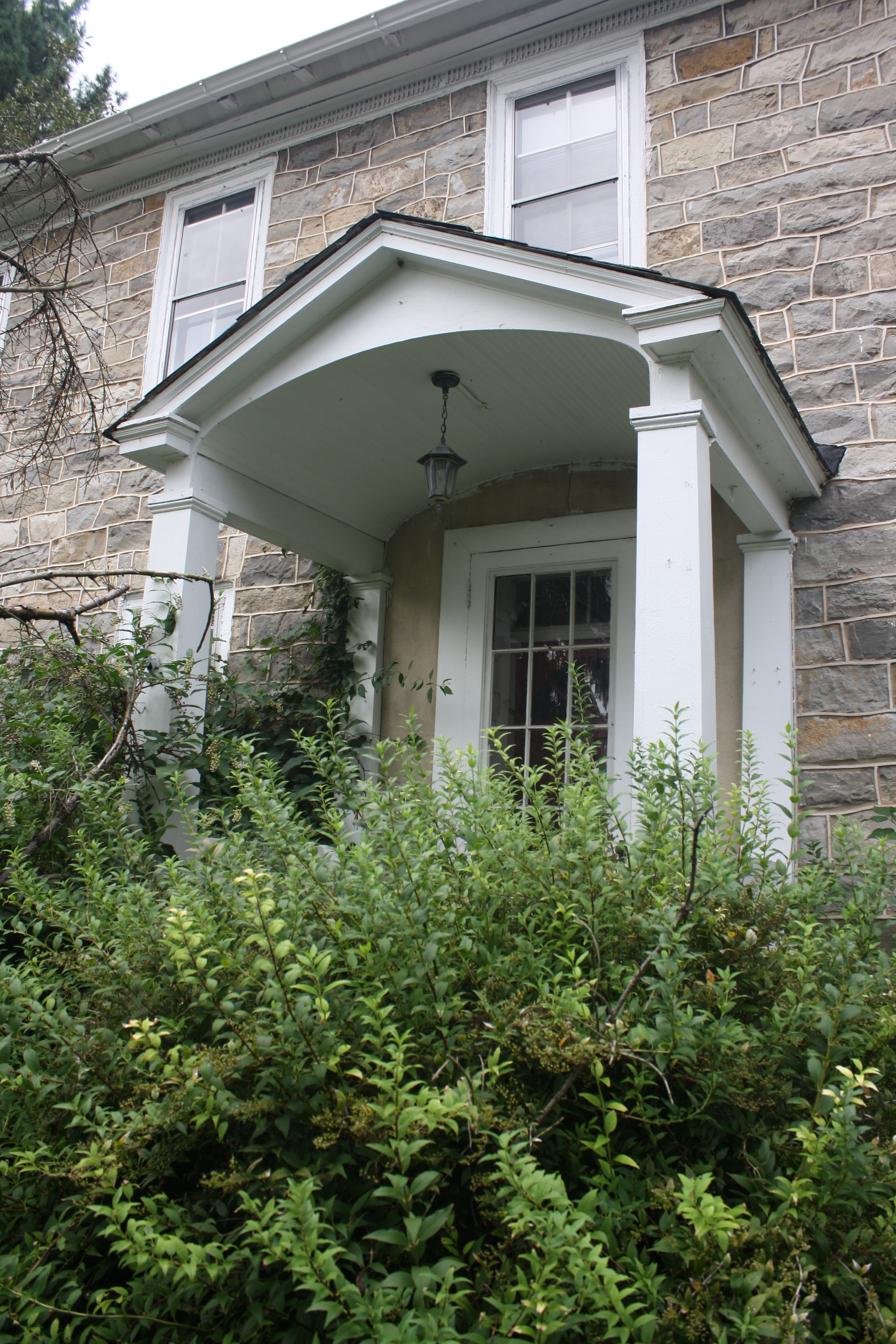
House entrance portico.

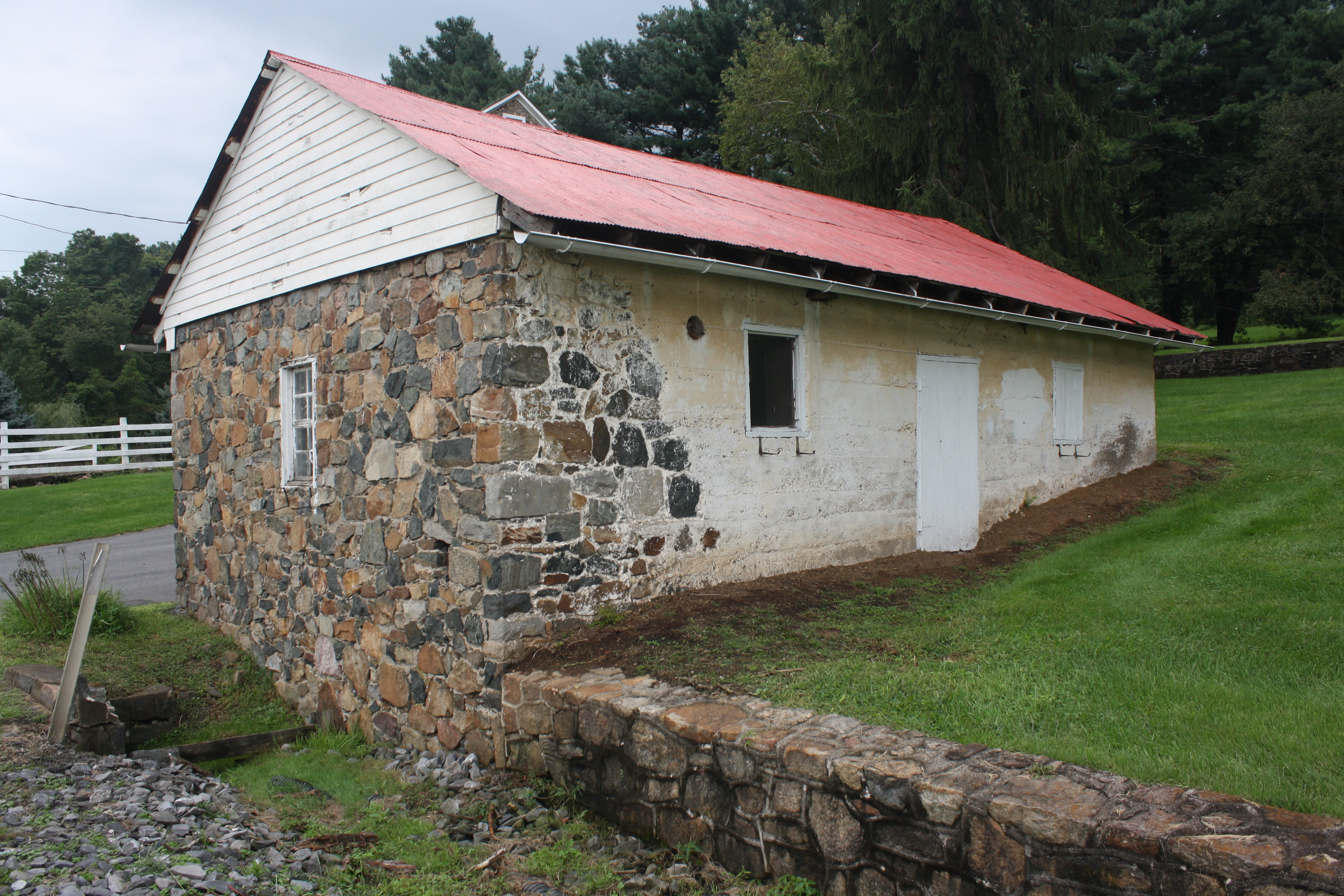
Carriage house.

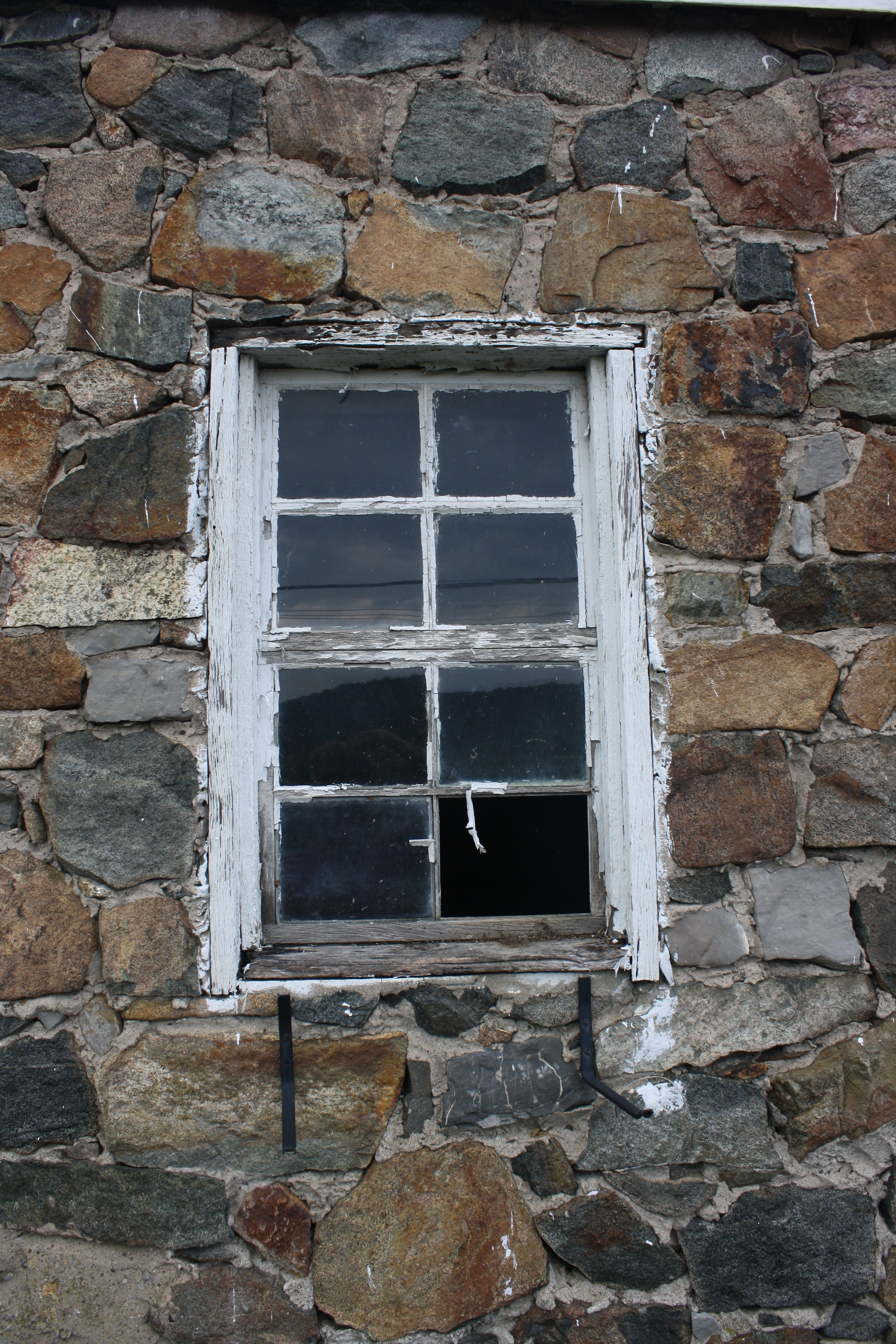
Front window in Carriage house.

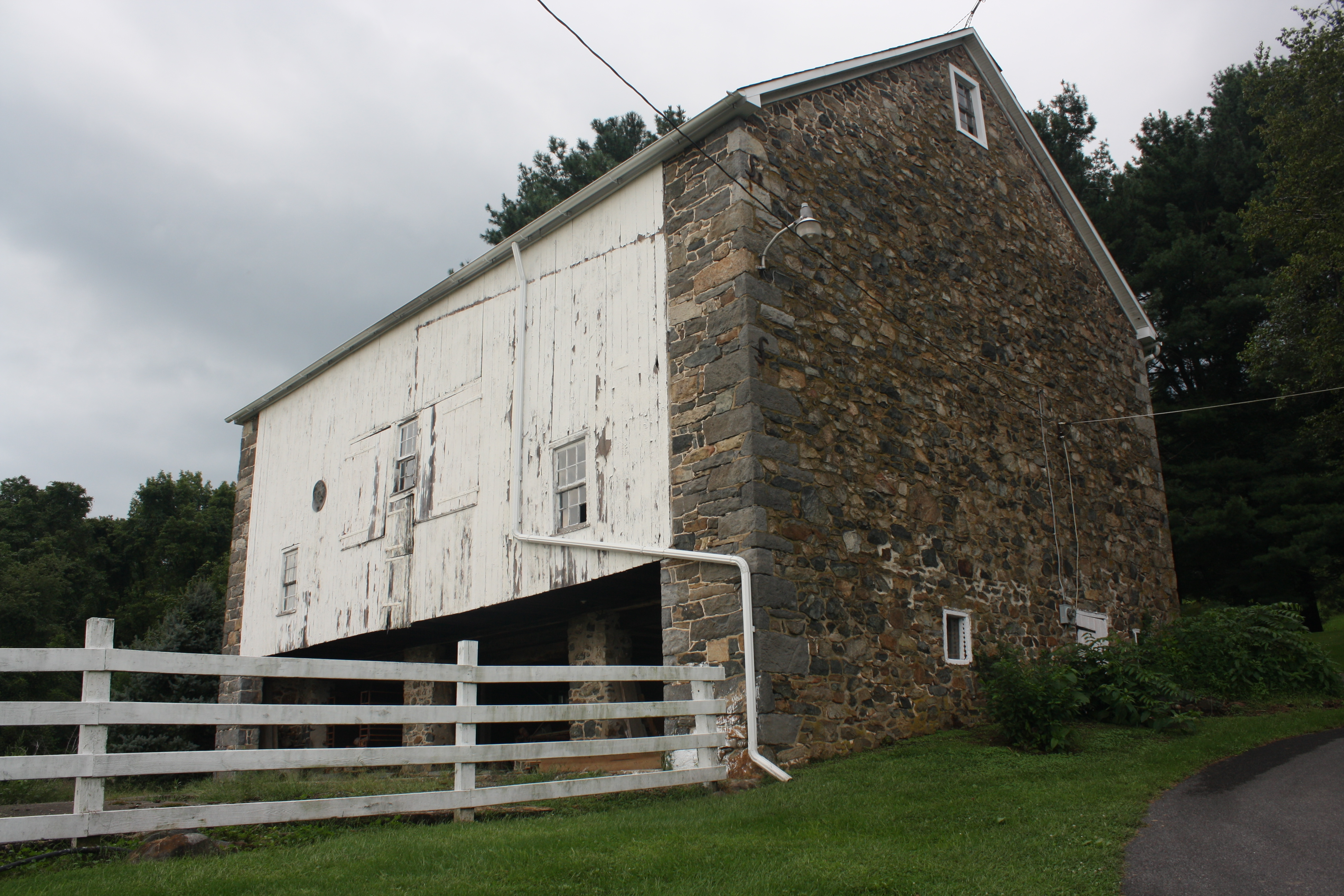
Barn front side.

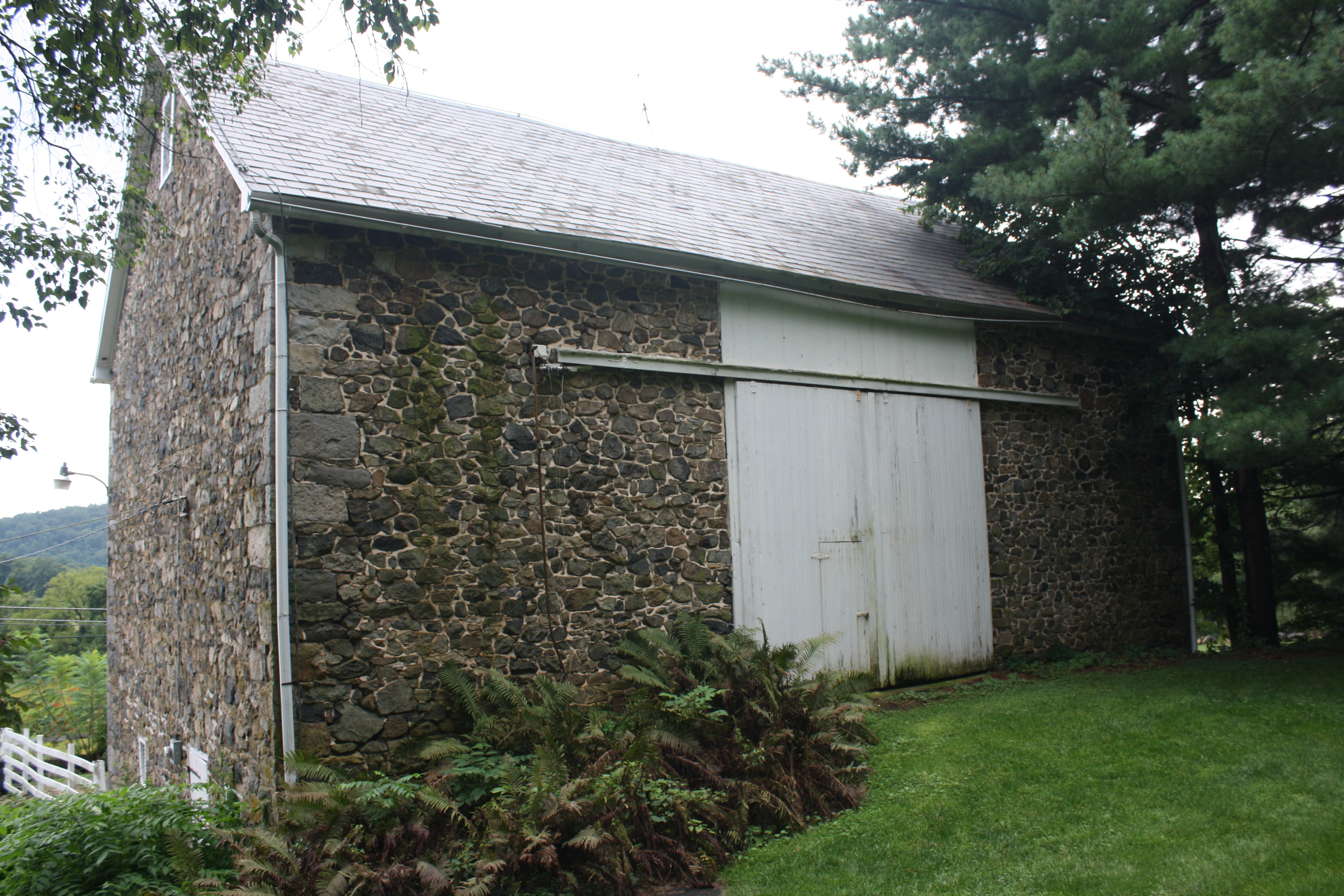
Barn back side.
