= Morgan Hill, Pennsylvania =

Unincorporated community in Pennsylvania, US

- Census-designated place
- Location within Pennsylvania Location within the United States
- Coordinates: 40°39′54″N 75°12′20″W
- Country: United States
- State: Pennsylvania
- County: Northampton
- Township: Williams

Area
  - Census-designated place: 0.75 sq mi (1.94 km^{2})
  - Land: 0.75 sq mi (1.94 km^{2})
  - Water: 0 sq mi (0.00 km^{2})
- Elevation: 650 ft (200 m)

Population (2020)
  - Census-designated place: 1,034
  - Density: 1,378.0/sq mi (532.06/km^{2})
  - Metro: 865,310 (US: 68th)
- Time zone: UTC-5 (Eastern (EST))
  - Summer (DST): UTC-4 (EDT)
- ZIP Code: 18042 (Easton)
- Area codes: 610 and 484
- FIPS code: 42-51008
- GNIS feature ID: 2805583

Morgan Hill is a suburban unincorporated community and census-designated place (CDP) in Northampton County, Pennsylvania, United States. It was first listed as a CDP prior to the 2020 census. As of the 2020 census, its population was 1,034. Morgan Hill is part of the Lehigh Valley metropolitan area, which had a population of 861,899 and was the 68th-most populous metropolitan area in the U.S. as of the 2020 census.

== Geography ==
Morgan Hill is located in southeastern Northampton County, in the northeastern part of Williams Township. It sits atop Morgan Hill, which rises to an elevation greater than 800 feet (240 m) above sea level in the west. The eastern part of the community is occupied by Morgan Hill Golf Course and associated housing.

Morgan Hill Road crosses the center of the CDP, leading north into Easton and southwest into Stouts Valley. Interstate 78 passes just north of the CDP, running along the base of the hill, and providing access via Exit 75 at Morgan Hill Road. I-78 leads west 21 miles (34 km) to the west side of Allentown and east 19 miles (31 km) through Clinton, New Jersey, where it terminates at the Holland Tunnel's entrance to Lower Manhattan.

Historical population
Census	Pop.	Note	%±
2020	1,034		—
U.S. Decennial Census
