= David Burke (Kilkenny hurler) =

Irish hurler, born 1963

Personal information
- Native name: Daithí de Búrca (Irish)
- Nickname: Stoney
- Born: 15 December 1963 (age 62) Urlingford, County Kilkenny, Ireland
- Height: 5 ft 7 in (170 cm)

Sport
- Sport: Hurling
- Position: Goalkeeper
Clubs
- Years: Club
- Emeralds; Mooncoin; Rathgarogue-Cushinstown
Inter-county*
| Years | County | Apps (scores) |
| 1984-1990 1991-1992 | Kilkenny; Wexford | 3 (0-00); 3 (0-00) |
Inter-county titles
- Leinster titles: 2
- All-Irelands: 0
- NHL: 0
- All Stars: 0
- *Inter County team apps and scores correct as of 00:45, 20 August 2014.

David Burke (born 15 December 1963) is an Irish retired hurler who played as a goalkeeper for the Kilkenny and Wexford senior teams.

Born in Urlingford, County Kilkenny, Burke first played competitive hurling during his schooling at Johnstown Vocational School. He arrived on the inter-county scene at the age of seventeen when he first linked up with the Kilkenny minor team, before later joining the under-21 and junior sides. He made his senior debut during the 1984-85 National Hurling League. Burke enjoyed a five-year career with Kilkenny before later joining the Wexford senior team. He won one Leinster medal and one National Hurling League medal as a non-playing substitute.

At club level Burke is a one-time championship medallist in the intermediate grade with Mooncoin. He began his career with Emeralds before later joining Rathgarogue-Cushinstown.

Throughout his career Burke made a combined total of six championship appearances. He retired from inter-county hurling following the conclusion of the 1992 championship.

== Honours ==
=== Team ===
Johnstown Vocational School

- All-Ireland Vocational Schools Senior Hurling Championship (1): 1982
- Leinster Vocational Schools Senior Hurling Championship (1): 1982

Mooncoin

- Kilkenny Intermediate Hurling Championship (1): 1990

Kilkenny

- Leinster Senior Hurling Championship (1): 1987 (sub)
- National Hurling League (1): 1989-90 (sub)
- All-Ireland Junior Hurling Championship (1): 1990
- Leinster Junior Hurling Championship (1): 1990
- All-Ireland Under-21 Hurling Championship (1): 1984
- Leinster Under-21 Hurling Championship (1): 1984
- All-Ireland Minor Hurling Championship (1): 1981
- Munster Minor Hurling Championship (1): 1981
