= Williams Township, Northampton County, Pennsylvania =

Township in Pennsylvania, US

Williams Township
- Township
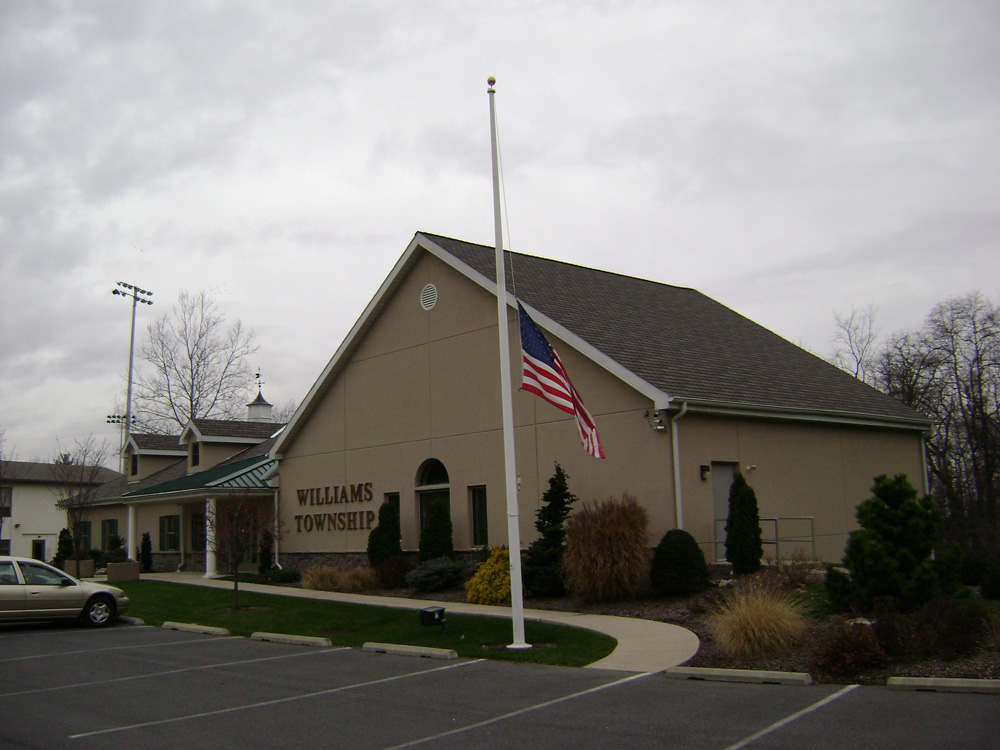
- Town hall

- Seal

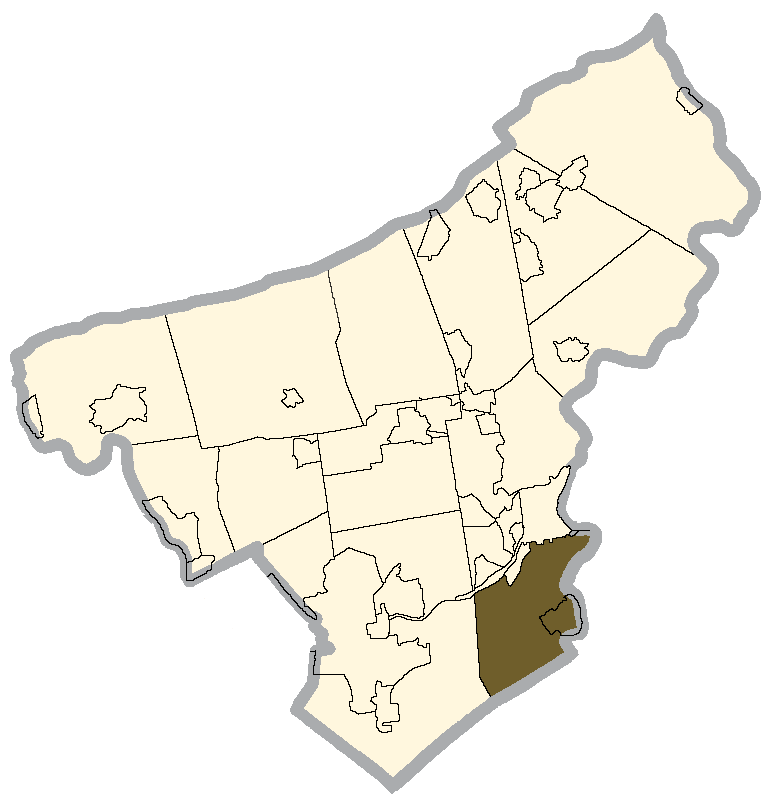
- Location of Williams Township in Northampton County, Pennsylvania

- Location of Williams Township in Pennsylvania Williams Township (the United States)
- Coordinates: 40°38′00″N 75°13′59″W
- Country: United States
- State: Pennsylvania
- County: Northampton
- Established: 1750

Area
  - Township: 18.58 sq mi (48.12 km^{2})
  - Land: 18.15 sq mi (47.02 km^{2})
  - Water: 0.42 sq mi (1.09 km^{2})
- Elevation: 643 ft (196 m)

Population (2020)
  - Township: 6,581
  - Density: 362.5/sq mi (139.96/km^{2})
  - Metro: 865,310 (US: 68th)
- Time zone: UTC-5 (EST)
  - Summer (DST): UTC-4 (EDT)
- Area code: 610
- FIPS code: 42-095-85256
- Primary airport: Lehigh Valley International Airport
- Major hospital: Lehigh Valley Hospital–Cedar Crest
- School district: Wilson Area
- Website: http://www.williamstwp.org

Williams Township is a township in Northampton County, Pennsylvania, United States. The township's population was 6,581 at the 2020 census. The township is part of the Lehigh Valley metropolitan area, which had a population of 861,899 and was the 68th-most populous metropolitan area in the U.S. as of the 2020 census.

== History ==
The Delaware Canal, Bridge in Williams Township, Jacob Arndt House and Barn, Coffeetown Grist Mill, and Isaac Stout House, all in the township, are each listed on the National Register of Historic Places. Another historic grist mill located in Williams Township is the Wottring Mill built in 1810 by William Wottring located on a road that is named in honor of William's mill on Wottrings Mill Road. Presently, it is an unregistered historic place that is privately owned.

Delaware Canal and towpath

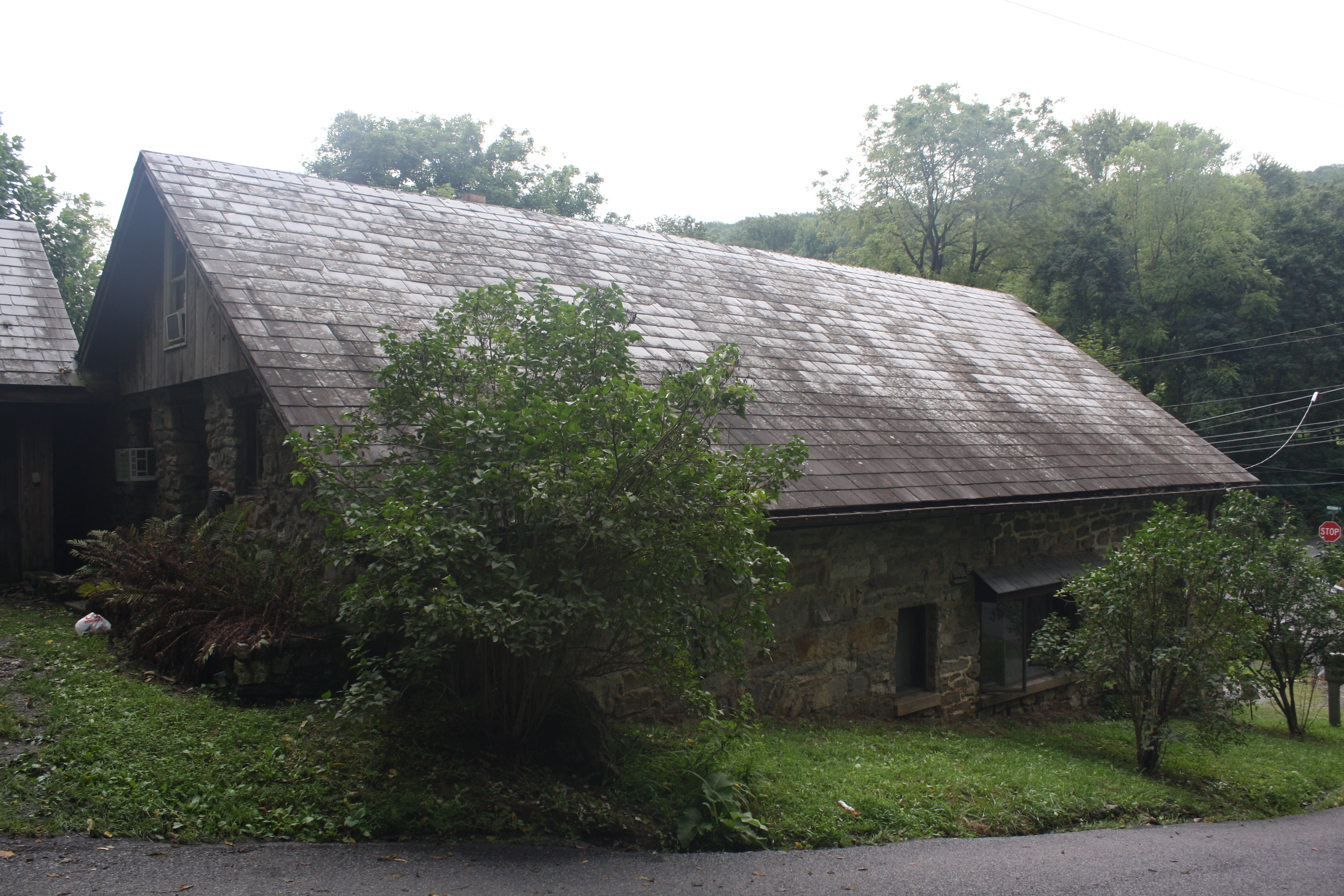
Coffeetown Grist Mill in William Township in September 2013

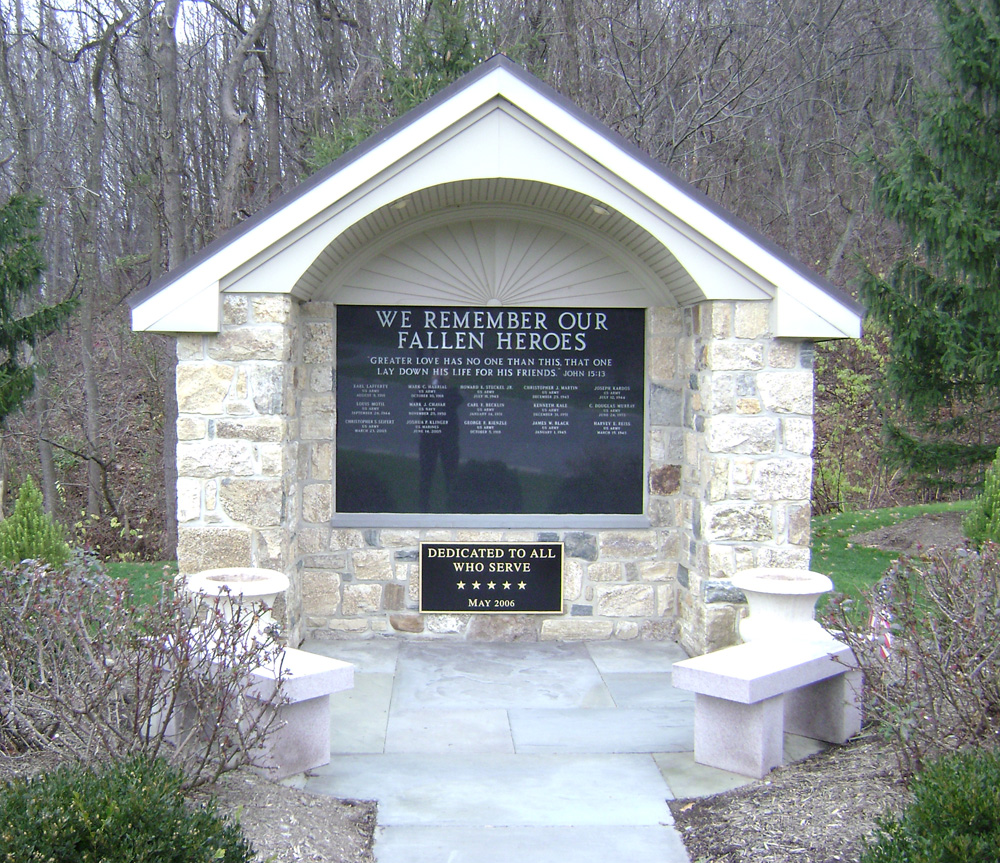
The Williams Township Veterans Memorial

== Geography ==
According to the U.S. Census Bureau, Williams Township has a total area of 18.6 square miles (48.1 km^{2}), of which 18.2 square miles (47.0 km^{2}) is land and 0.4 square mile (1.1 km^{2}) (2.28%) is water. It is drained by the Delaware River, which separates it on the east from New Jersey. Its villages include Coffeetown, Raubsville, and Stouts. Morgan Hill is a census-designated place in the northeastern part of the township.

=== Neighboring municipalities ===
- Easton (north)
- Glendon (north)
- Lower Saucon Township (west)
- Springfield Township, Bucks County (tangent to the southwest)
- Durham Township, Bucks County (south)
- Riegelsville, Bucks County (southeast)
- Pohatcong Township, New Jersey (east)
- Phillipsburg, New Jersey (northeast)

== Demographics ==
Historical population
Census	Pop.	Note	%±
2000	4,470		—
2010	5,884		31.6%
2020	6,581		11.8%
U.S. Decennial Census

As of the 2000 census, there were 4,470 people, 1,657 households, and 1,267 families residing in the township. The population density was 243.0 inhabitants per square mile (93.8/km^{2}). There were 1,738 housing units at an average density of 94.5 per square mile (36.5/km^{2}). The racial makeup of the township was 97.25% White, 0.81% African American, 0.04% Native American, 0.94% Asian, 0.02% Pacific Islander, 0.13% from other races, and 0.81% from two or more races. Hispanic or Latino of any race were 1.05% of the population.

There were 1,657 households, out of which 31.1% had children under the age of 18 living with them, 66.6% were married couples living together, 6.0% had a female householder with no husband present, and 23.5% were non-families. 18.4% of all households were made up of individuals, and 7.0% had someone living alone who was 65 years of age or older. The average household size was 2.70 and the average family size was 3.10.

In the township, the population was spread out, with 24.2% under the age of 18, 5.9% from 18 to 24, 28.1% from 25 to 44, 28.8% from 45 to 64, and 13.0% who were 65 years of age or older. The median age was 41 years. For every 100 females, there were 99.4 males. For every 100 females age 18 and over, there were 98.5 males.

The median income for a household in the township was $56,196, and the median income for a family was $66,488. Males had a median income of $44,545 versus $29,358 for females. The per capita income for the township was $27,249. About 1.7% of families and 2.7% of the population were below the poverty line, including 1.4% of those under age 18 and 2.2% of those age 65 or over.

== Transportation ==
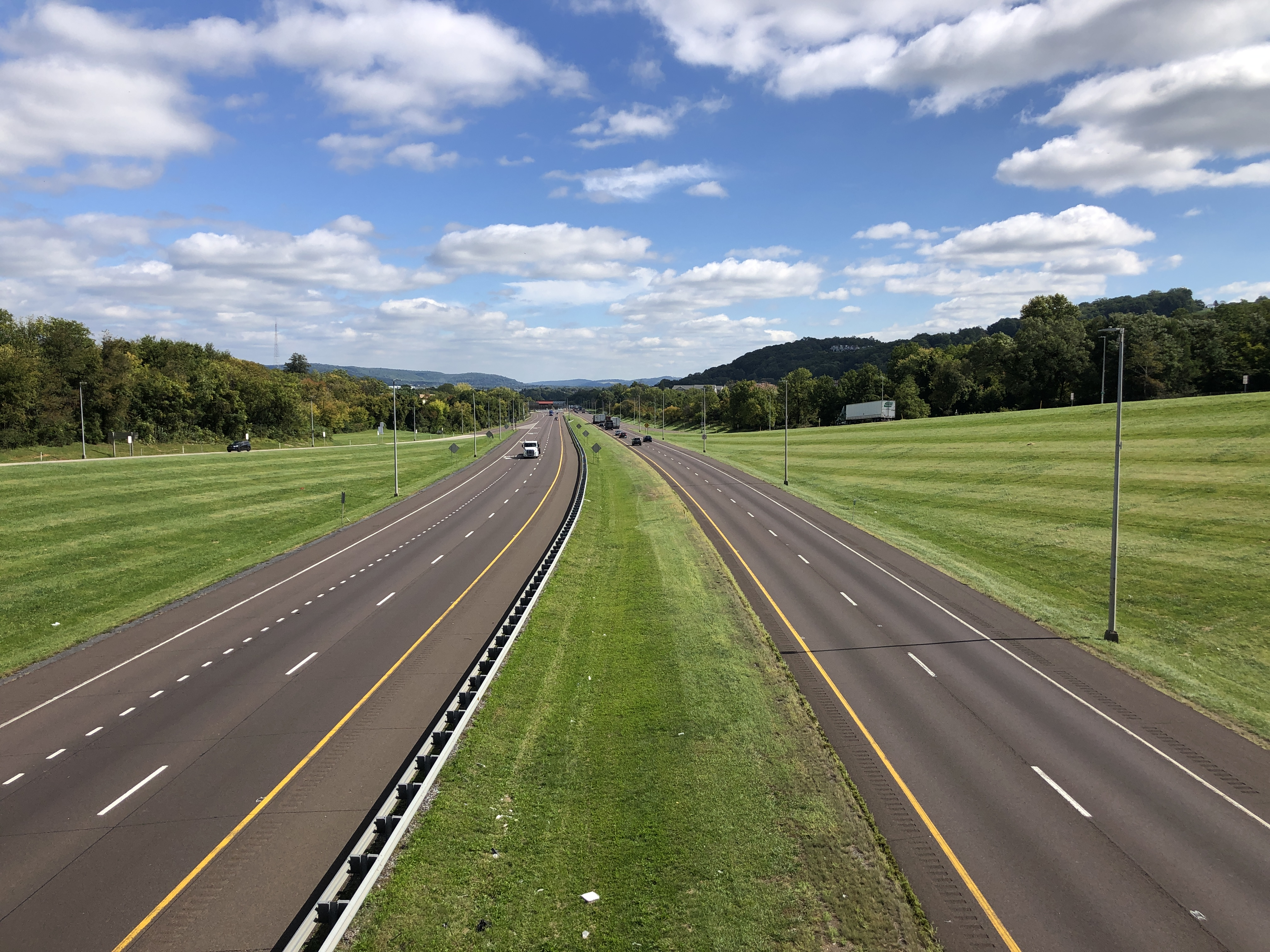
I-78 East in Williams Township

As of 2018, there were 75.22 miles (121.05 km) of public roads in Williams Township, of which 29.11 miles (46.85 km) were maintained by the Pennsylvania Department of Transportation (PennDOT) and 46.11 miles (74.21 km) were maintained by the township.

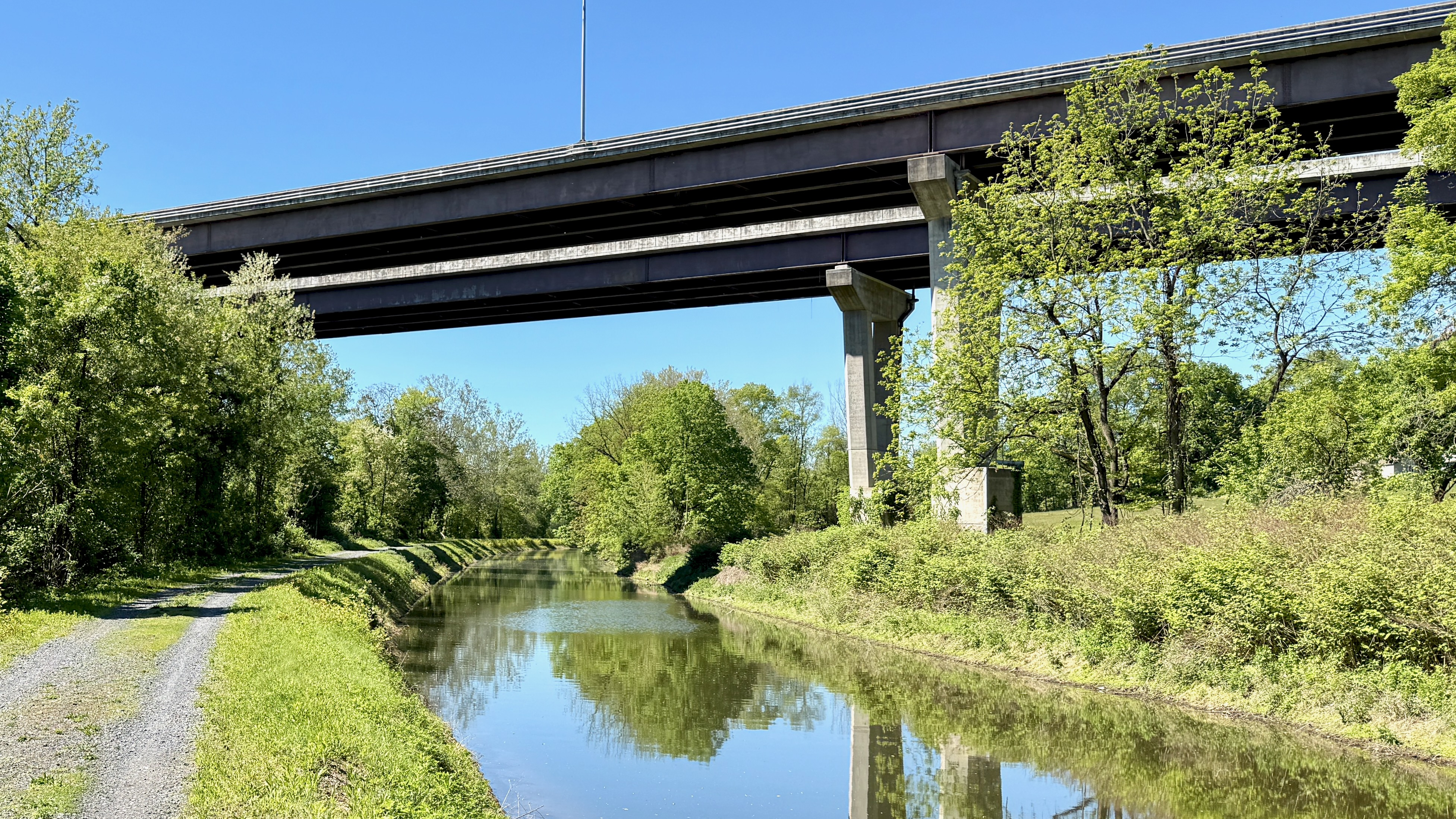
Interstate 78 Toll Bridge crossing the Delaware Canal in the township

Interstate 78 follows an east-to-west alignment in the northern part of Washington Township. I-78's Easton interchange is with Old Philadelphia Road/Morgan Hill Road in the township. The western end of the Interstate 78 Toll Bridge, which crosses the Delaware River to Phillipsburg, New Jersey, is located in Williams Township. Route 611 follows a north–south alignment along the Delaware River from Martins Creek via Easton to Kintnersville. It is connected to the I-78 interchange by Cedarville Road. Other notable local roads are Durham Road, Hellertown-Raubsville Road, and Island Park Road.

== Education ==
The township is served by the Wilson Area School District. Students in grades K through 4 attend Williams Township Elementary School, 5 through 8 attend Wilson Area Intermediate School, and 9 through 12 attend Wilson Area High School in the district.
