= Dave Burke (Australian footballer) =

Australian rules footballer

Personal information
- Full name: David Barmby Burke
- Born: 14 October 1916; Bellerive, Tasmania
- Died: 4 January 1987 (aged 70); Burwood East, Victoria
- Height: 185 cm (6 ft 1 in)
- Weight: 83 kg (183 lb)

Playing career^{1}
Years	Club	Games (Goals)
1936–37, 1939	North Melbourne	20 (8)
- ^{1} Playing statistics correct to the end of 1939.

David Barmby Burke MC (14 October 1916 – 4 January 1987) was an Australian rules footballer who played with North Melbourne in the Victorian Football League (VFL).

== Personal life ==
Burke served as a lieutenant in the Second Australian Imperial Force during the Second World War. He was awarded the Military Cross for actions in the South Pacific in November 1943.
