= Wilson Area School District =

School district in Pennsylvania

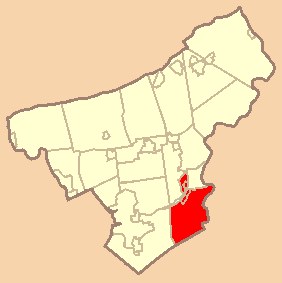
- Map of Wilson Area School District in Northampton County, Pennsylvania

Address
- 2040 Washington Boulevard Easton, Pennsylvania, 19042; United States
- Coordinates: 40.6854°N 75.2425°W

District information
- Type: Public
- Motto: Enter to learn, go forth to serve
- Grades: K through 12
- Established: February 10, 1913
- Superintendent: Doug Wagner
- Schools: Five, including Wilson Area High School
- Budget: $45.727 million
- NCES District ID: 4226550

Students and staff
- Students: 2,123 (2023-24)
- Teachers: 156.00 (on an FTE basis)
- Student–teacher ratio: 13.61
- Athletic conference: Colonial League
- Colors: Blue and gold

Other information
- Website: www.wilsonareasd.org

Wilson Area School District is a public school district located in Northampton County, Pennsylvania in the Lehigh Valley region of eastern Pennsylvania. It serves the boroughs of Glendon, West Easton, and Wilson, and Williams Township.

Students in ninth through 12th grades attend Wilson Area High School in the district. As of the 2023–24 school year, the school district had a total enrollment of 2,123 students between all five of its schools, according to National Center for Education Statistics data.

== History ==
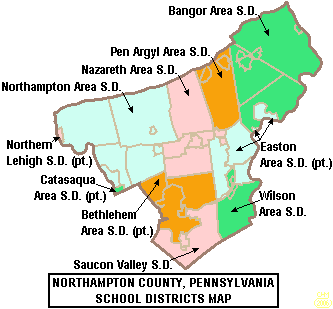
Map of Northampton County, Pennsylvania school districts, including Wilson Area School District

The school district was established on February 10, 1913 when the township of Wilson, Pennsylvania was formed.

In July 2021, following a year of demands for racial justice after the murder of George Floyd, Wilson Area School District Superintendent Doug Wanger announced that the district would no longer be purchasing school uniforms with Native American imagery. They will continue using the Warriors mascot name, but will be using a scripted W logo instead of the feathered headdress that had been previously used.

=== Litigation ===
Palmer School District v. Wilson School District, 1914- Representing Palmer: George L. Xander, Representing Wilson- Asher Seip. According to the report by Henry D. Maxwell of Easton, this case stemmed from the fact a certain amount of indebtedness was created when on Feb. 10, 1913 the Township of Wilson was created and thus automatically created a certain amount of debt owed back to Palmer for the related loss. While Wilson attempted to delay the matter in court, this delay inevitably failed. The resultant of the case was on June 14, 1915, Wilson School District owed Palmer School District $8,428.33.

Wilson Area School District, Borough of Wilson, and Northampton County v. Easton Hospital, 708 A.2d 835 (Pa. Cmwlth. 1998)- This 2000 decision of Supreme Court of Pennsylvania appeal deals with the rights of the governing bodies to assess real estate taxation upon Easton Hospital, which at the time was involved with various for-profit subsidiary entities. The decision was found in favor of the hospital and its non-profit status. Justice Nigro filed a dissenting opinion.

On April 21, 2008, the Wilson Area School Board approved $44.8 million in renovations to the Philip F. Lauer Middle School. Construction began in the late summer of 2009. The plan entails adding new building wings to both sides of the school's current gymnasium and athletics building, then demolishing the rest of the building, essentially creating a new school building on the same property. The board chose this option instead of a $45.7 million plan that would renovate the existing building and make minimal building additions because it would result in a longer construction period, less open space and more classroom disruption. The 38-year-old middle school building had not been renovated since its construction, and school officials had discussed renovations for years the plans were approved.

The sixth, seventh, and eighth grade students moved into the new building on April 25, 2011. The school will begin servicing the fifth graders of the district starting in the 2011–2012 school year. Now that it will be serving fifth grade students, the building has been renamed Wilson Area Intermediate School.

== Schools ==
- Wilson Area High School
- Wilson Area Intermediate School
- Avona Elementary School
- Williams Township Elementary School
- Wilson Borough Elementary School

== Notable alumni ==
- Dee Roscioli, Broadway musical Wicked
