= David Burke (Australian footballer, born 1959) =

Australian rules footballer and coach

Personal information
- Full name: David Burke
- Nickname: legovich (legs)
- Born: 6 November 1959 (age 66)
- Original team: Horsham
- Height: 189 cm (6 ft 2 in)
- Weight: 83 kg (183 lb)

Playing career^{1}
Years	Club	Games (Goals)
1980	Essendon	3 (6)
- ^{1} Playing statistics correct to the end of 1980.

David Burke (born 6 November 1959) is a former Australian rules footballer who played with Essendon in the Victorian Football League (VFL).

Burke played only three senior games for Essendon, but notably kicked five goals on his league debut, against North Melbourne at Arden Street Oval. He played in the Geelong Football League after leaving Essendon, first at St Mary's in 1982, then Bell Park from 1983 to 1986, as a playing assistant coach.
