= Glendon, Pennsylvania =

Borough in Pennsylvania, US

Borough of Glendon
- Borough
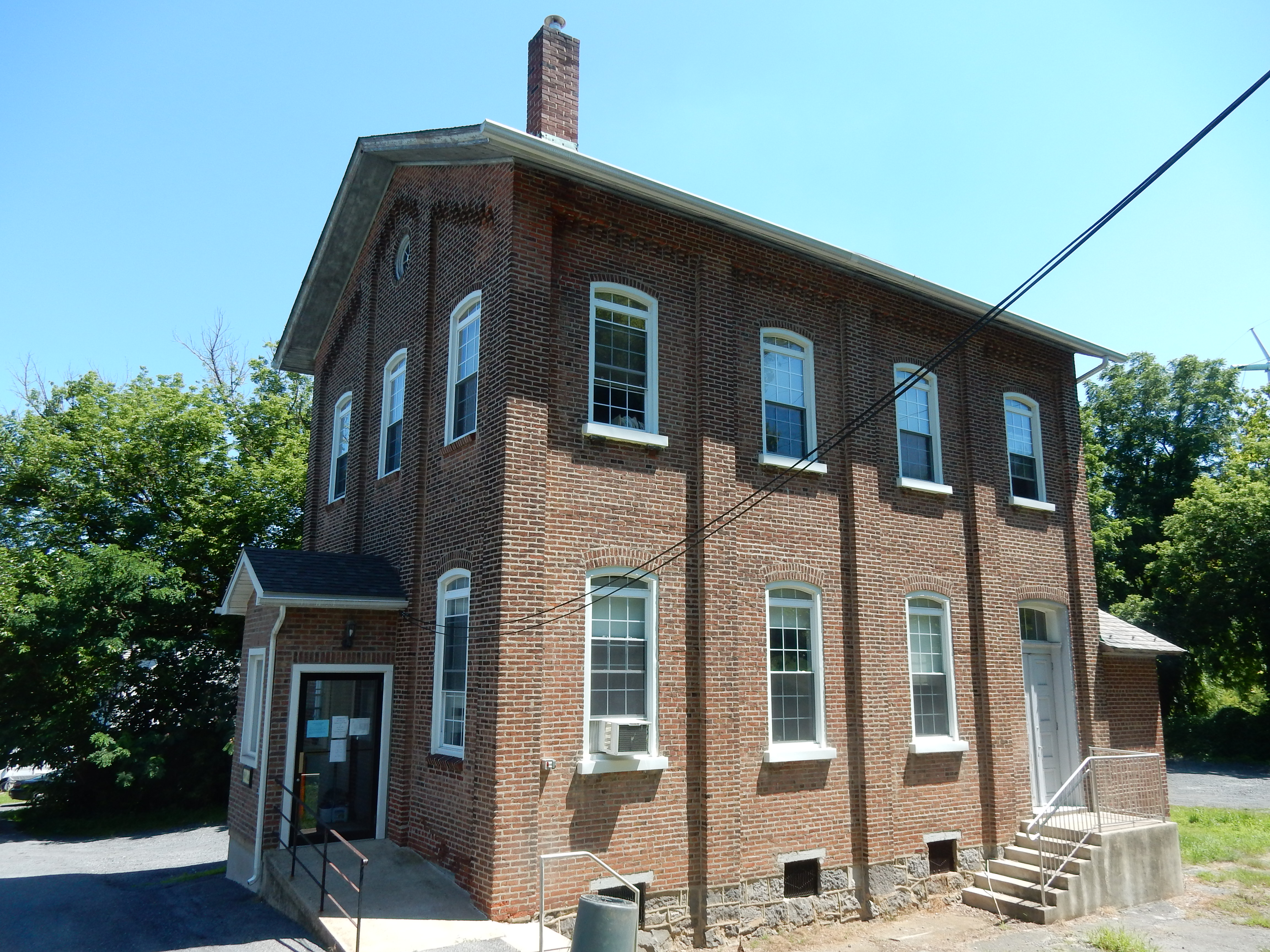
- Glendon Borough Hall in July 2015

- Location of Glendon in Northampton County, Pennsylvania (left) and of Northampton County in Pennsylvania (right)

- Location of Glendon in Pennsylvania Glendon (the United States)
- Coordinates: 40°39′44″N 75°14′09″W
- Country: United States
- State: Pennsylvania
- County: Northampton

Government
  - Mayor: Mindy McAllister

Area
  - Borough: 0.62 sq mi (1.60 km^{2})
  - Land: 0.61 sq mi (1.59 km^{2})
  - Water: 0 sq mi (0.00 km^{2})
- Elevation: 230 ft (70 m)

Population (2020)
  - Borough: 373
  - Density: 606.3/sq mi (234.09/km^{2})
  - Metro: 865,310 (US: 68th)
- Time zone: UTC-5 (EST)
  - Summer (DST): UTC-4 (EDT)
- ZIP Code: 18042
- Area codes: 610 and 484
- FIPS code: 42-29568
- Primary airport: Lehigh Valley International Airport
- Major hospital: St Lukes-Easton
- School district: Wilson Area
- Website: www.glendonboro.com

Glendon is a borough in Northampton County, Pennsylvania. The population of Glendon was 373 at the 2020 census. Glendon is part of the Lehigh Valley metropolitan area, which had a population of 861,899 and was thus the 68th-most populous metropolitan area in the U.S. as of the 2020 census. Glendon is the second smallest municipality in Northampton County by population, just ahead of Chapman.

== History ==
=== Foundation ===
The territory that would make up Glendon consisted of a few scattered farms prior to 1844 when the Glendon Iron Works opened. By 1856, the iron works was recognized as one of the best in Pennsylvania in terms of quality leading to the construction of 30 to 40 buildings to support the growing workforce. The company town quickly grew, and by 1867 had a population of 141, enough to warrant the community to be incorporated as a borough, resulting in even more growth, with the population jumping to 707 by 1870.

Joseph Morrison, an immigrant from Castle Toothery in Killowen, Ireland was named the first Chief Burgess (Note: Chief Burgess is a discontinued title from early American municipal governments in Pennsylvania, that was a largely ceremonial executive officer of a municipality that usually served one year terms) and by 1880 the population reached 1,000. Around this time the mining industry was starting to fade, and the residents, who mostly spent their salaries on cheap whiskey, caused the borough to develop a reputation for rowdiness.

Despite being a company town, Glendon was known for never having a strike during the gilded age, never having a union presence among its workers, and high wages among its workers that were comparable to what financial analysts on Wall Street were making at the time. Additionally, the residents of Glendon where notably more conservative than other laborers, opening a chapter of the Patriotic Order Sons of America, which is still in operation. Despite the small size, the borough also maintained a police force and public school system.

== Geography ==
Glendon is located at 40°39′44″N 75°14′9″W (40.662152, -75.235758). According to the U.S. Census Bureau, the borough has a total area of 0.6 square miles (1.6 km^{2}), all land.

== Transportation ==
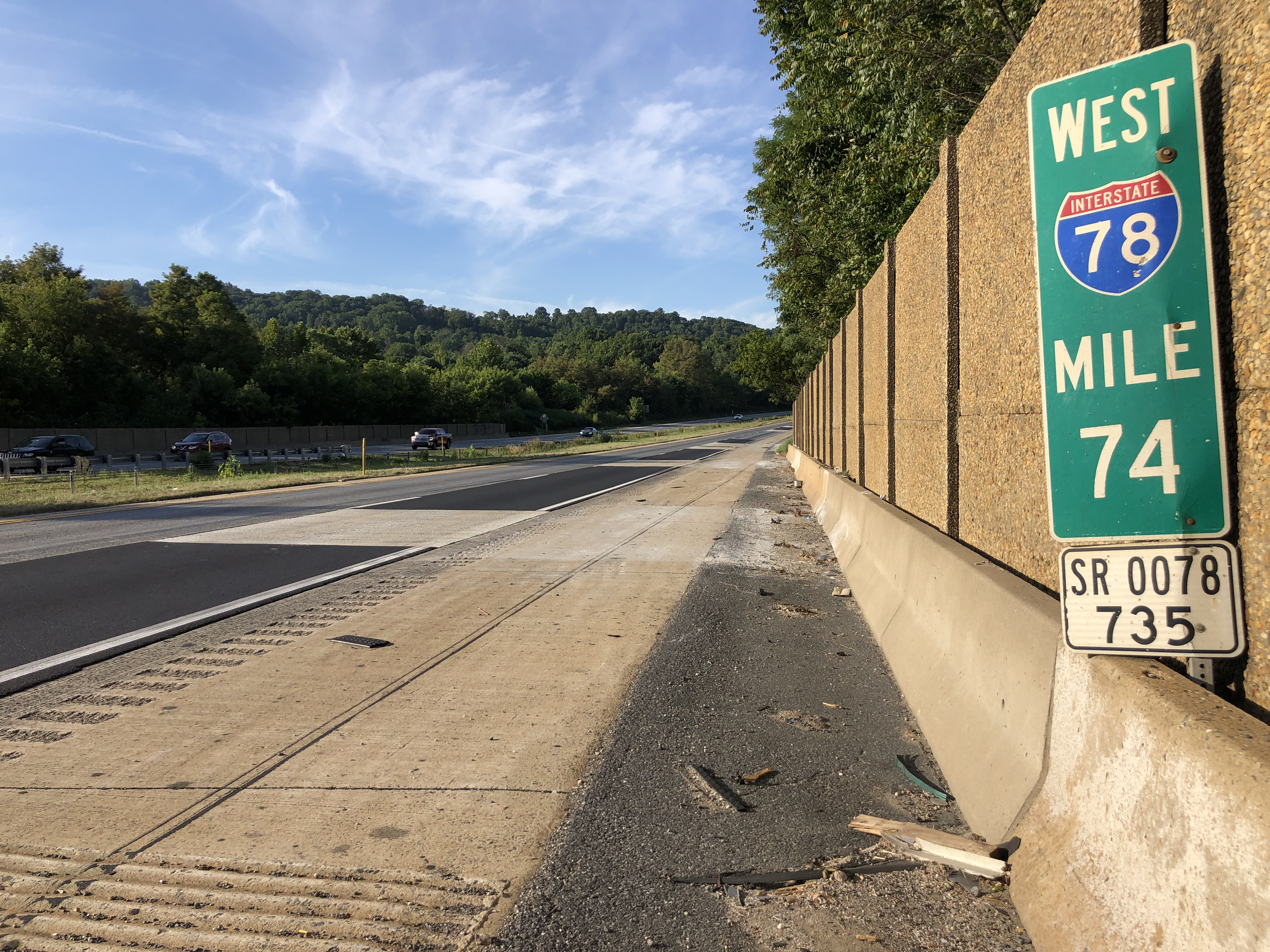
I-78 West in Glendon

As of 2007, there were 4.33 miles (6.97 km) of public roads in Glendon, of which 1.07 miles (1.72 km) were maintained by the Pennsylvania Department of Transportation (PennDOT) and 3.26 miles (5.25 km) were maintained by the borough.

Interstate 78 passes through Glendon, following a southwest–northeast alignment through the length of the borough. However, the nearest exit is in neighboring Williams Township. Main thoroughfares in the borough include Island Park Road, Main Street, and 25th Street.

== Demographics ==
Historical population
Census	Pop.	Note	%±
1870	707		—
1880	982		38.9%
1890	907		−7.6%
1900	704		−22.4%
1910	823		16.9%
1920	715		−13.1%
1930	615		−14.0%
1940	552		−10.2%
1950	601		8.9%
1960	555		−7.7%
1970	637		14.8%
1980	354		−44.4%
1990	391		10.5%
2000	367		−6.1%
2010	440		19.9%
2020	373		−15.2%

As of the 2000 census, there were 367 people, 139 households, and 98 families residing in the borough. The population density was 573.7 inhabitants per square mile (221.5/km^{2}). There were 150 housing units at an average density of 234.5 per square mile (90.5/km^{2}). The racial makeup of the borough was 95.64% White, 0.82% African American, 1.36% Asian, 0.27% from other races, and 1.91% from two or more races. Hispanic or Latino of any race were 2.18% of the population.

There were 139 households, out of which 33.1% had children under the age of 18 living with them, 58.3% were married couples living together, 7.9% had a female householder with no husband present, and 28.8% were non-families. 23.0% of all households were made up of individuals, and 16.5% had someone living alone who was 65 years of age or older. The average household size was 2.64 and the average family size was 3.15.

In the borough, the population was spread out, with 28.9% under the age of 18, 4.4% from 18 to 24, 30.2% from 25 to 44, 23.4% from 45 to 64, and 13.1% who were 65 years of age or older. The median age was 36 years. For every 100 females there were 109.7 males. For every 100 females age 18 and over, there were 107.1 males.

The median income for a household in the borough was $42,969, and the median income for a family was $45,417. Males had a median income of $37,813 versus $33,375 for females. The per capita income for the borough was $17,593. About 12.9% of families and 15.4% of the population were below the poverty line, including 28.4% of those under age 18 and 9.1% of those age 65 or over.

== Public education ==
The borough is served by the Wilson Area School District. Students in grades nine through 12 attend Wilson Area High School in Easton.

== Gallery ==
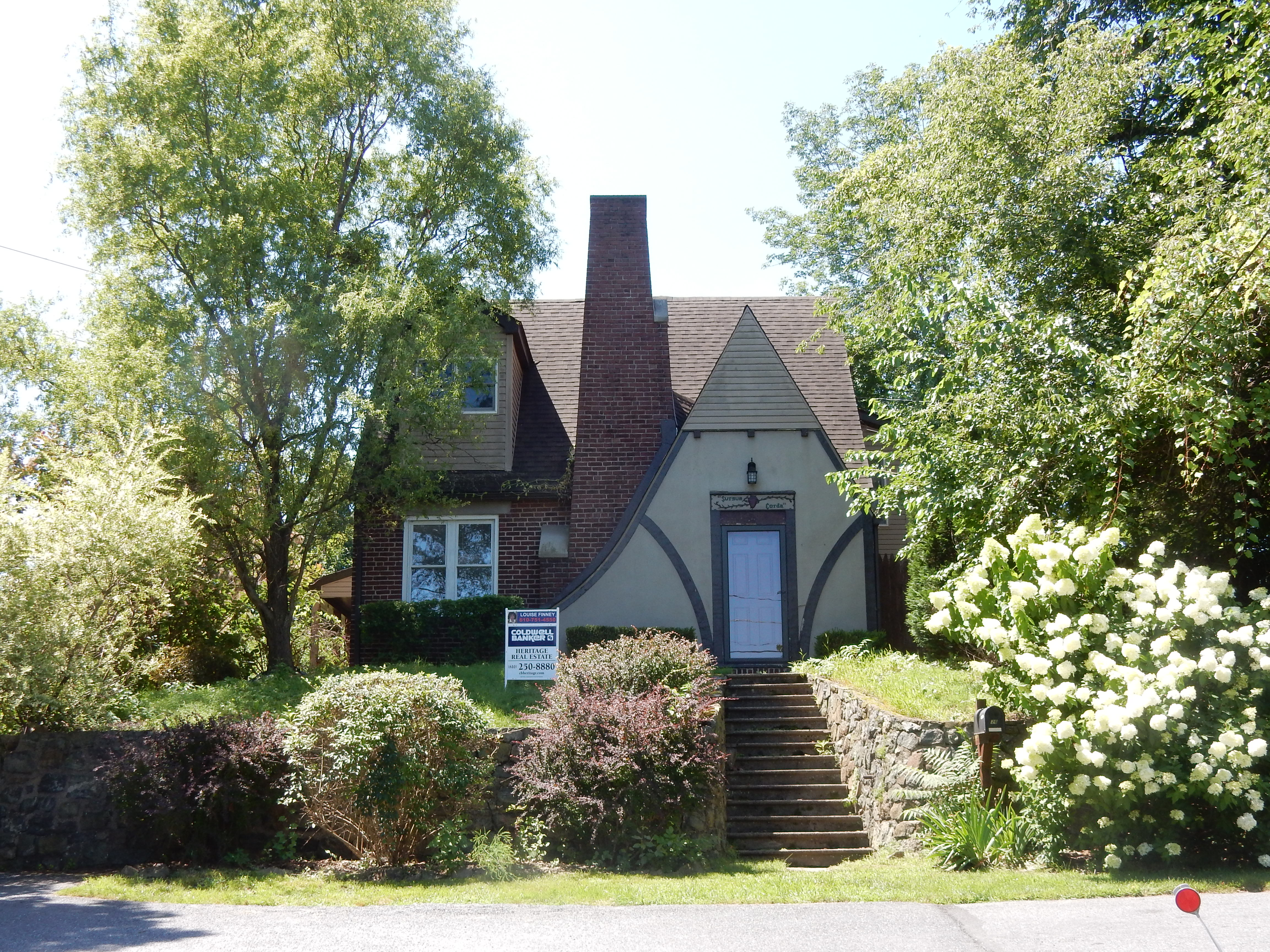
House on Franklin Street

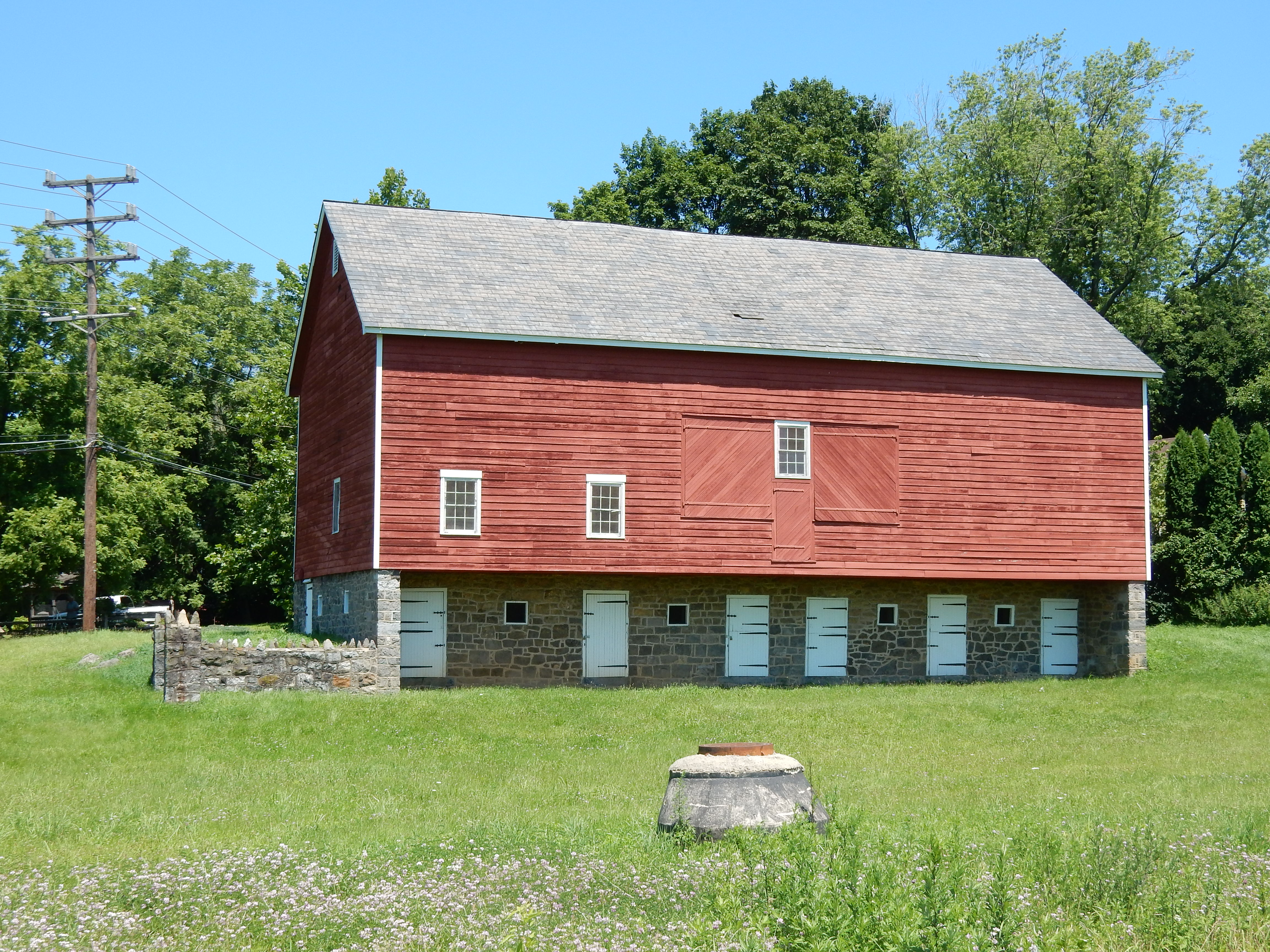
Barn on High Street
