= Wilson Area High School =

Location
- 424 Warrior Lane; Easton, Pennsylvania 18042; United States; 40.6844°N 75.2446°W

Information
- Type: Public high school
- NCES School ID: 422655003522
- Principal: John Martuscelli
- Teaching staff: 46.25 (on an FTE basis)
- Grades: 9th–12th
- Enrollment: 709 (2024–25)
- Student to teacher ratio: 15.33
- Campus type: Suburb: Large
- Colors: Blue and gold
- Athletics conference: Colonial League
- Mascot: Warrior
- Team name: Warriors
- Publication: Jostens
- Newspaper: The Echo
- Yearbook: Les Memoires
- Website: wahs.wilsonareasd.org

Wilson Area High School is a four-year public high school located in Easton, Pennsylvania in the Lehigh Valley region of eastern Pennsylvania. It is the only high school in the Wilson Area School District. The high school supports the residents of Wilson, West Easton and Glendon boroughs, and Williams Township.

As of the 2024–25 school year, the school had an enrollment of 709 students, according to National Center for Education Statistics data.

The school mascot is the Warrior, and its colors are blue and gold. The school superintendent announced in July 2021 that the entire school district will be using a 'W' logo instead of the feathered headdress on future purchases of uniforms and merchandise.

== Athletics ==
The school's athletic teams belongs to PIAA's District XI and are a member of the Colonial League.

=== Football ===
Wilson's football team has been noted for its dominance in the Colonial League in the mid-2000s. It was the state title runners-up in 2005 with a final team record of 12–3. It went undefeated in 2006 and won the PIAA AA-State Championship against Jeannette Senior High School with a final record of 16–0. The Warriors won the PIAA District 11 title consecutively in 2005, 2006 and then again in 2008. They also held the Colonial League title in 1984, 1989, 2006, 2008, and 2009. Games can be spectated at Smith Field, next to the high school.

=== Track and field ===
Wilson's track and field program has been undefeated for seven years (2005–2011) with a team record of 70–0. The boys team has won the Colonial League title in 2001, 2006, 2007, 2008, 2009, 2010, and 2011.

=== Wrestling ===
The Wilson wrestling team has won Pennsylvania state titles in 2001 and 2002 and been ranked as high as 8th nationally and includes several state champions.

=== Mascot controversy ===
In July 2021, the school superintendent announced that the school district would be using a 'W' logo on future purchases of uniforms and merchandise. In August, however, this decision was reversed due to pushback from the community.

== Activities ==
The school's drama club has put on a show almost every year since 1924 and its first show was in 1912. It participates in the Freddy Awards, a local awards show organized by State Theatre for high school musicals in the Lehigh Valley.

== Notable alumni ==
- Jeff Fisher, high school football journalist and co-founder, High School Football America
- Dee Roscioli, Broadway singer and actress, Wicked
- Dave Van Horne, former play-by-play announcer, Miami Marlins Radio Network
