= Pat Glendon =

Irish hurler

Personal information
- Native name: Pádraig Mac Giolla Fhiondáin (Irish)
- Born: 10 March 1895 Urlingford, County Kilkenny, Ireland
- Died: 22 June 1967 (aged 72) Urlingford, County Kilkenny, Ireland
- Occupation: Farmer

Sport
- Sport: Hurling
- Position: Left corner-back
Club
- Years: Club
- 1912–1928: Clomanto
Club titles
- Kilkenny titles: 0
Inter-county
- Years: County
- 1922–1926: Kilkenny
Inter-county titles
- Leinster titles: 2
- All-Irelands: 1

Patrick Glendon (10 March 1895 – 22 June 1967) was an Irish hurler. Usually lining out as at corner-back, he was a member of the Kilkenny team that won the 1922 All-Ireland Championship.

Glendon had a lengthy career with Clomanto, however, he had little in terms of club success.

After being selected for the Kilkenny senior team in 1922, he was a regular member of the team at various times over the following five championship seasons. He won his first Leinster medal in his debut season in 1922 before later winning his sole All-Ireland medal after Kilkenny's defeat of Tipperary in the final. Glendon won a second Leinster medal in 1926.

Glendon was married to Johanna (née Moriarty). Prior to his hurling career he was an active member of the Old IRA during the War of Independence. Glendon died suddenly at his home on 22 June 1967.

== Honours ==
Kilkenny

- All-Ireland Senior Hurling Championship (1): 1922
- Leinster Senior Hurling Championship (2): 1922, 1926
