= Jimmy Tobin =

Irish hurler (1898–1978)

Personal information
- Native name: Séamus Ó Tóibín (Irish)
- Born: 7 April 1898 Urlingford, County Kilkenny, Ireland
- Died: 12 July 1978 (aged 80) Urlingford, County Kilkenny, Ireland
- Occupation: Farmer

Sport
- Sport: Hurling
- Position: Right corner-back
Club
- Years: Club
- 1916-1926: Urlingford
Club titles
- Kilkenny titles: 0
Inter-county
- Years: County
- 1920-1924: Kilkenny
Inter-county titles
- Leinster titles: 2
- All-Irelands: 1

James Tobin (7 April 1898 – 12 July 1978) was an Irish hurler. Usually lining out at corner-back, he was a member of the Kilkenny team that won the 1922 All-Ireland Championship.

Tobin enjoyed a decade-long club career with Urlingford, however, he enjoyed little in terms of championship success.

After being selected for the Kilkenny senior team in 1920, Tobin held his position on the team for the following five championship seasons. He won his first Leinster medal in 1922 before later winning his sole All-Ireland medal after Kilkenny's defeat of Tipperary in the final. Tobin won a second Leinster medal in 1923.

Tobin was married to Anastatia (née Talbot) and had nine children. He died on 12 July 1978.

== Honours ==
Kilkenny

- All-Ireland Senior Hurling Championship (1): 1922
- Leinster Senior Hurling Championship (2): 1922, 1923
