= Urlingford =

Town in County Kilkenny, Ireland

Urlingford Irish: Áth na nUrlainn
- Town
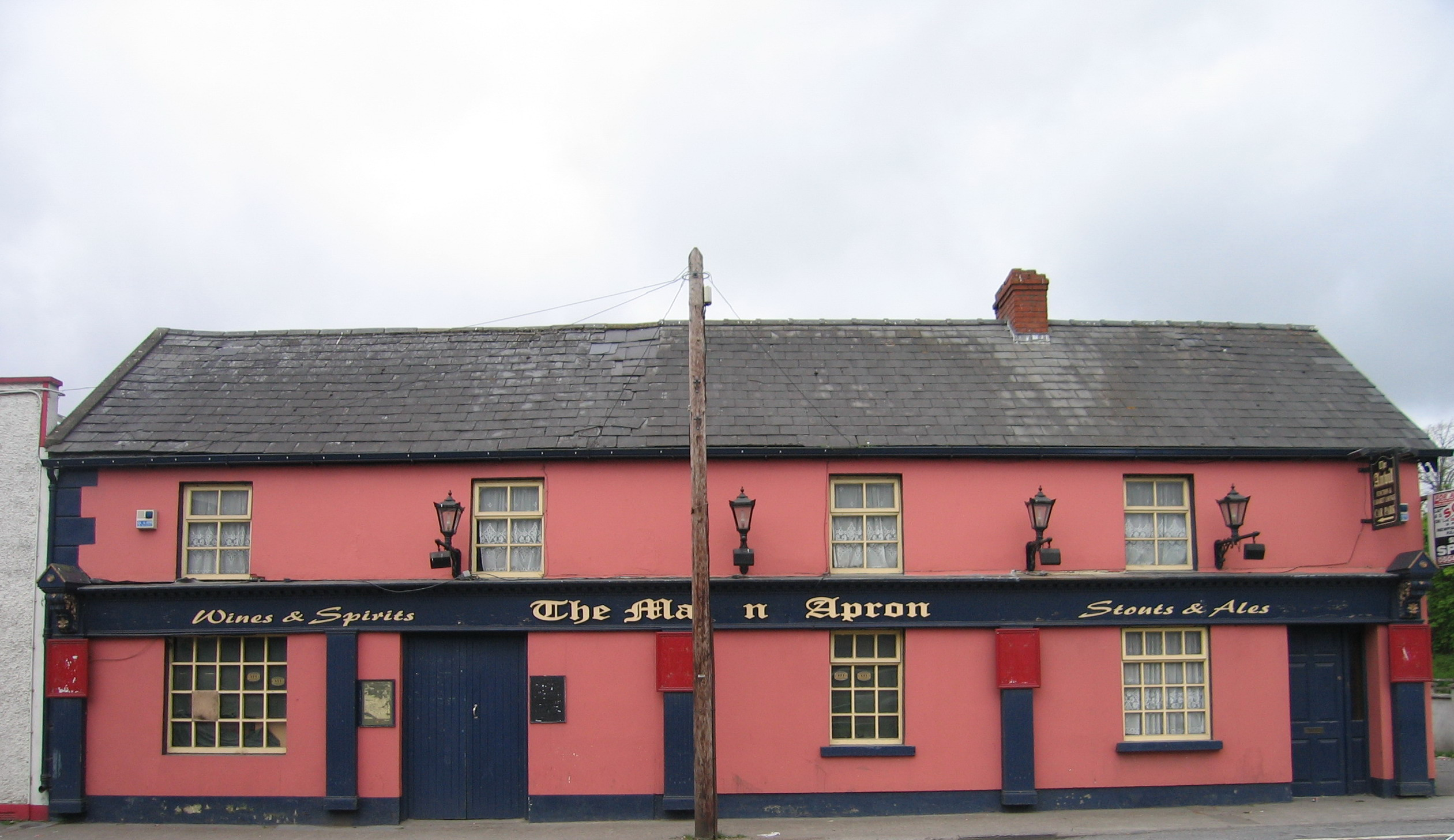
- The Mason's Apron, Urlingford

- Location in Ireland
- Coordinates: 52°43′13″N 7°34′57″W
- Country: Ireland
- Province: Leinster
- County: County Kilkenny
- Elevation: 120 m (390 ft)

Population (2016)
  - Total: 1,038
- Time zone: UTC+0 (WET)
  - Summer (DST): UTC+1 (IST (WEST))
- Irish Grid Reference: S282633

Urlingford (Irish: Áth na nUrlainn, meaning 'Ford of the slaughter') is a town in County Kilkenny, Ireland. It is also a civil parish within the barony of Galmoy. The town is in the north west of the county, along the boundary with County Tipperary, 16 km north-east of Thurles.

== Access ==
The town lies on the R639. The M8 motorway runs just west of the town, from which both Urlingford and nearby Johnstown are accessed via Junction Four. Urlingford is a bus hub, with major operator JJ Kavanagh and Sons based there. Situated 125 km (78 mi) from Dublin and 129 km (80 mi) from Cork, Urlingford has long been a resting point for travellers halfway between the Republic of Ireland's two largest cities. As a result, until May 2012 the Bus Éireann Dublin to Cork bus service called here. It is now replaced by route 828 from Portlaoise which connects with express bus at Cashel and the 858 Portlaoise to Thurles service also serves the town.

== Toponymy ==
The Irish name Áth na nUrlainn means "ford of the slaughter" and has been anglicised as Aghnenurlin, Aghnenoorlin, Awnanoorlin and similar.

== History ==
Historical population
Year	Pop.	±%
1831	1,366	—
1841	1,742	+27.5%
1851	1,168	−33.0%
1936	492	−57.9%
1946	586	+19.1%
2011	973	+66.0%
2016	1,038	+6.7%

In 1526, Piers Butler, 8th Earl of Ormond, gave possession of the lands of Urlingford to John Tobin and Nicolas Mothing (chaplins). The earlier settlement was focused around the castle, church and graveyard.

The town had an organised planned growth with traditional plot patterns. It was built over a cut-over bog, an extension to the Templetuohy Bog, much of which has been reclaimed. Urlingford is a linear town around the focused primary axis, the Main Street. In 1837 it was the centre of manufacture of coarse stuffs, flannels, and worsteds, and carries on an extensive retail trade with the surrounding districts.

The town was recorded on Griffith's Valuation in 1864. Urlingford has taken part in the Tidy Towns Competition.

=== Rivers ===
A minor tributary of the River Nore, the River Goul, enters the town from the southeast. It sources 6 kilometers away from the town in the Slieveardagh hills. The river passes under the Main Street and towards the bridge at Urlingford Castle (and mill).

== Buildings ==
There is a library in Urlingford which is based in the old courthouse. Urlingford Castle and mill are located in Urlingford.

== Sport ==
Emeralds GAA is a junior Gaelic Athletic Association club, founded in 1972.

== See also ==
- List of towns and villages in Ireland

== Sources ==
- Fiontar (2008). "Placenames Database of Ireland". logainm.ie. Department of Community, Rural and Gaeltacht Affairs of the Government of Ireland. Archived from the original on 22 April 2010.
- Griffith (1864). "Griffith's Valuation". Ask About Ireland. Archived from the original on 13 July 2016.
- Carrigan, William (1905). The History and Antiquities of the Diocese of Ossory. Sealy, Bryers & Walker. ISBN 9785879206463. Archived from the original on 25 September 2021.
- Tighe, William (1802). Statistical observations relative to the county of Kilkenny: made in the years 1800 & 1801. Printed by Graisberry and Campbell. Archived from the original on 25 September 2021.
- CSO, Central Statistics Office. "CSO Website". cso.ie. Government of Ireland. Archived from the original on 4 April 2016.
- OHPR. "The Online Historical Population Reports Project". Histpop. University of Essex. Archived from the original on 7 May 2016.
- Lewis, Samuel (1837). A Topographical Dictionary of Ireland. Archived from the original on 7 July 2016.
