= Jacobsburg Environmental Education Center =

State park in Pennsylvania, US

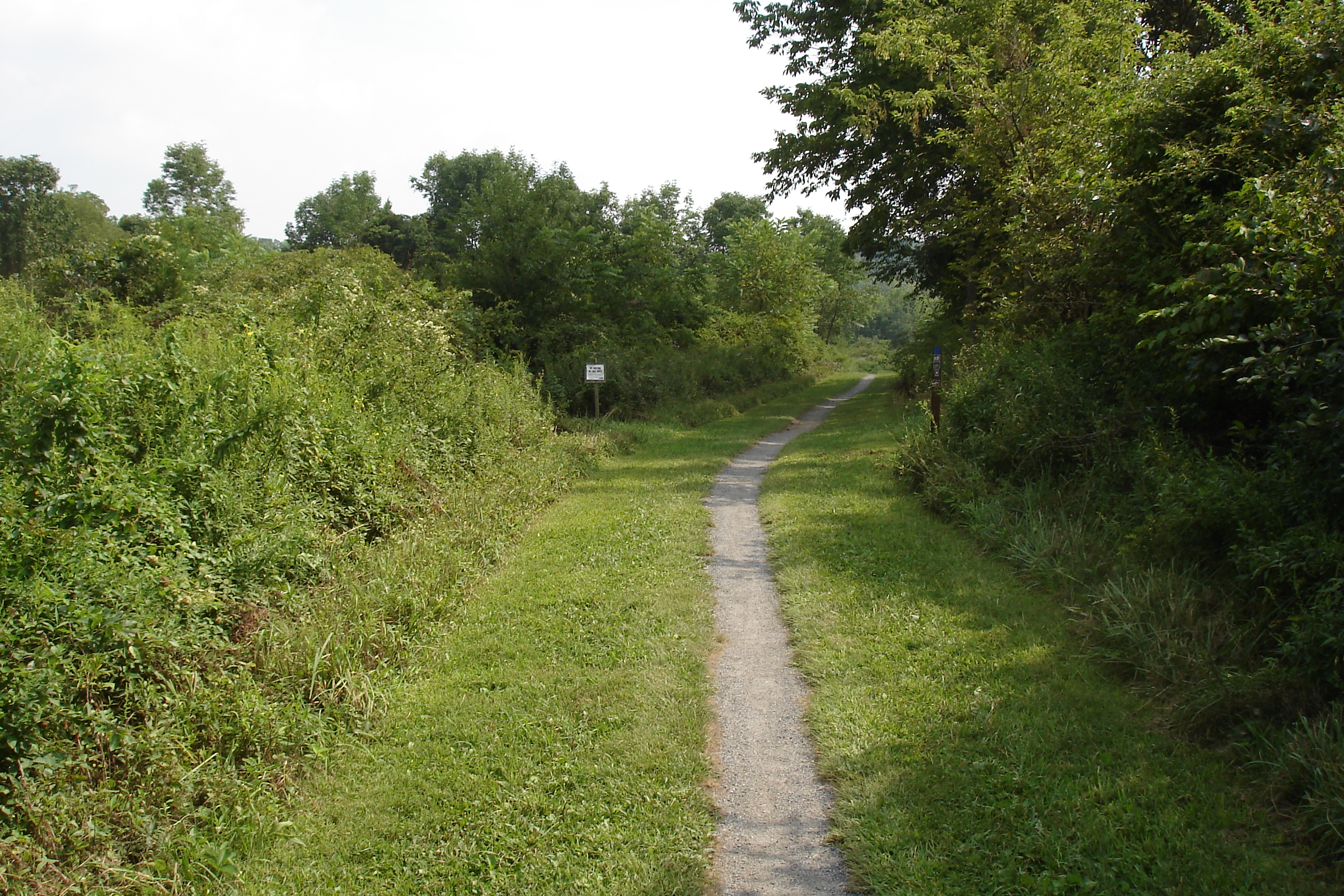

- Location within Pennsylvania Location within the United States
- Interactive map of Jacobsburg Environmental Education Center
- Location: Bushkill Township, Northampton County, Pennsylvania, United States
- Coordinates: 40°47′02″N 75°17′37″W
- Area: 1,168 acres (473 ha)
- Elevation: 489 feet (149 m)
- Established: 1959
- Administrator: Pennsylvania Department of Conservation and Natural Resources
- Website: Official website
- Pennsylvania State Parks
- Jacobsburg Historic District
- U.S. National Register of Historic Places
- U.S. Historic district
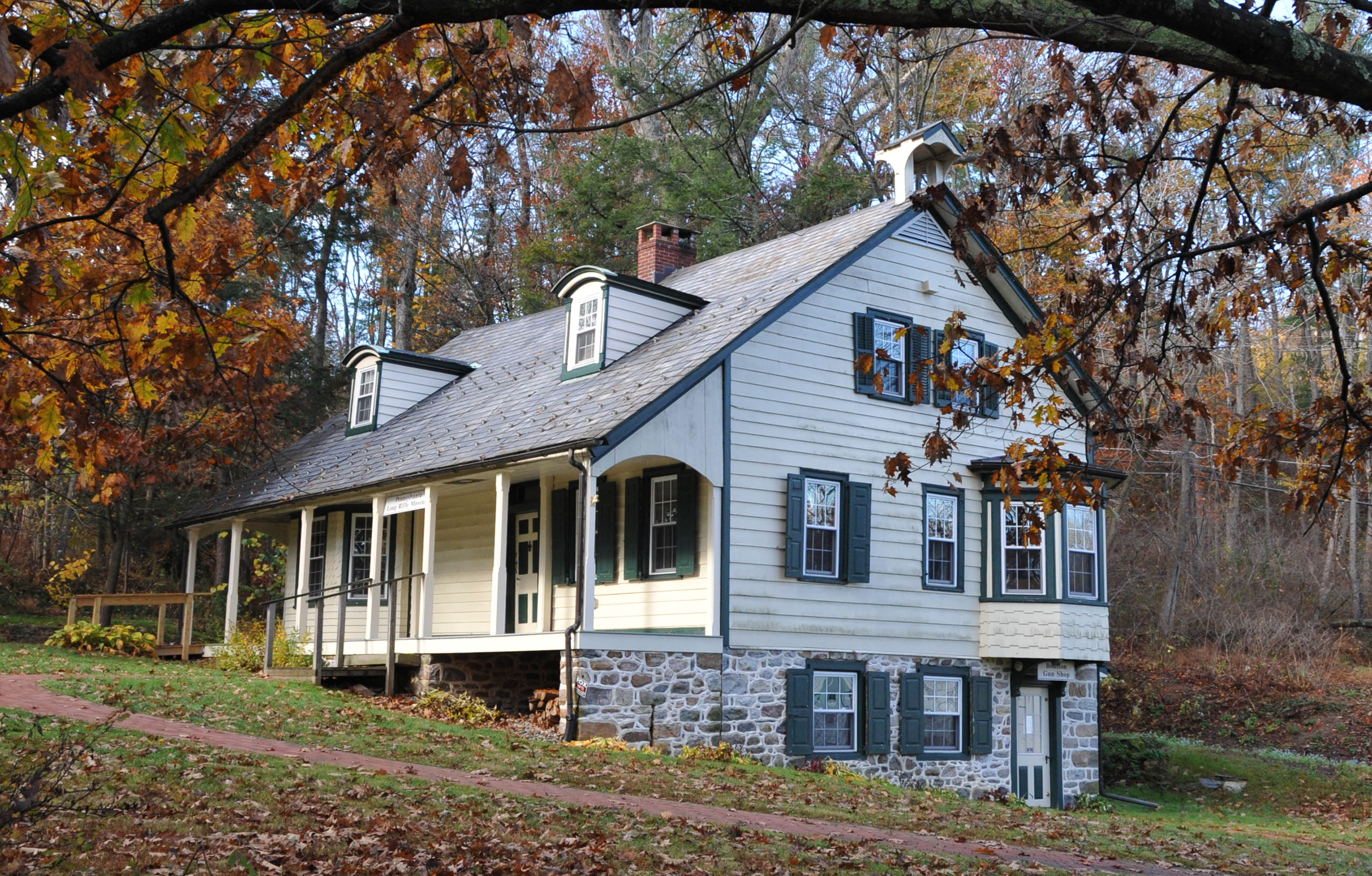
- The Henry homestead
- Nearest city: Nazareth, Pennsylvania
- Area: 500 acres (200 ha)
- Built: 1740
- Architect: Multiple
- Architectural style: Federal
- NRHP reference No.: 77001181
- Added to NRHP: October 17, 1977

Jacobsburg Environmental Education Center is a 1,168-acre (473 ha) Pennsylvania state park near Wind Gap, in Bushkill Township, Northampton County in Pennsylvania. The Jacobsburg National Historic District is almost entirely surrounded by the park. Jacobsburg Environmental Education Center is just off the Belfast exit of Pennsylvania Route 33.

== Environmental education ==
The main purpose of Jacobsburg Environmental Education Center is to provide environmental education for the citizens of Pennsylvania and specifically the students of the nearby elementary schools, high schools, colleges, and universities. Jacobsburg stays busy offering hands on opportunities to these students and their teachers with a "discovery and problem solving" approach.

== Jacobsburg National Historic District ==
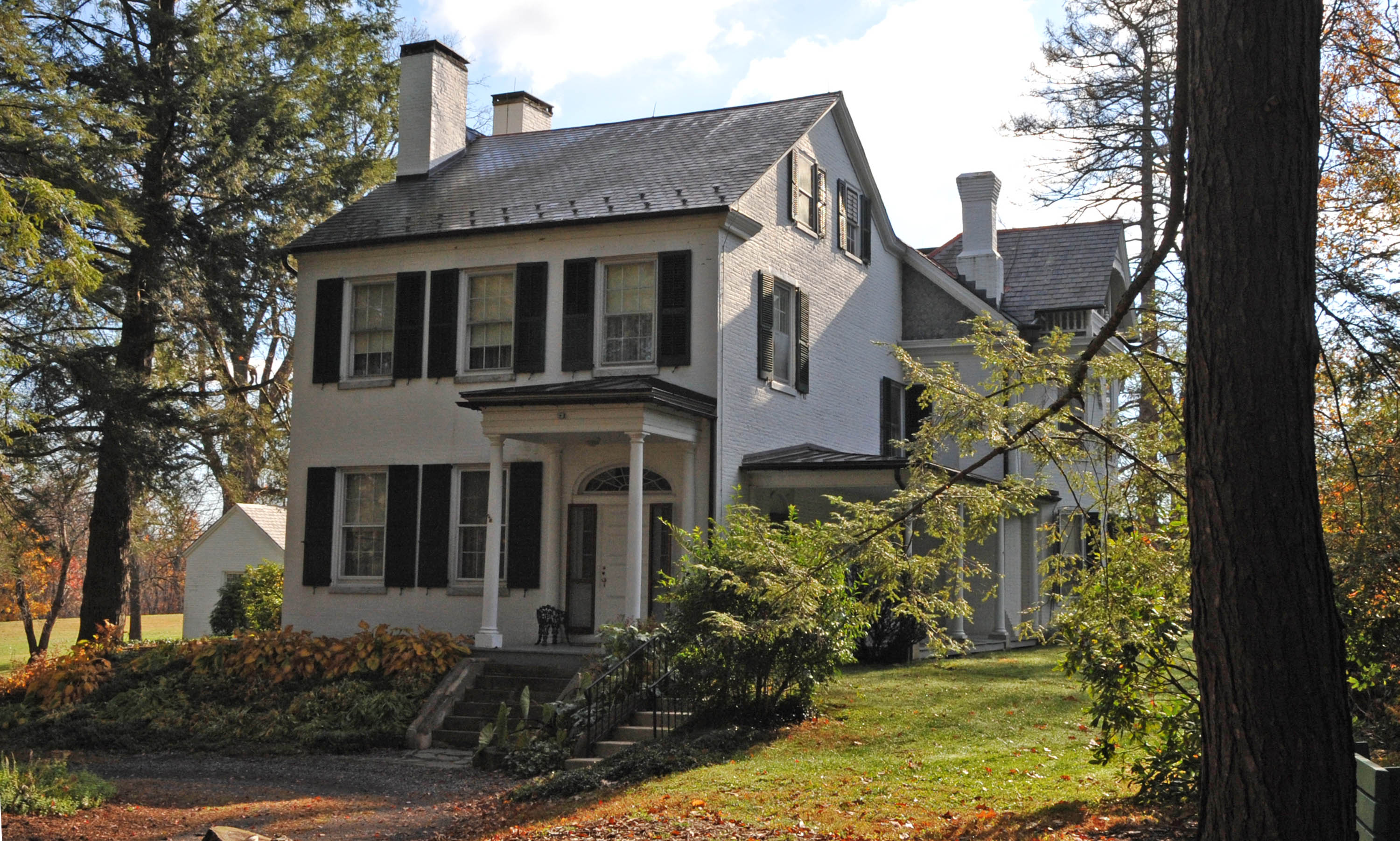
The Jacobsburg house, built in 1832

The Jacobsburg National Historic District is the location of the Henry Homestead. The district includes 11 contributing buildings and 34 contributing sites. Jacobsburg Historical Society provides a heritage education program with classes in gunmaking and blacksmithing. Rendezvouses and period military encampments are included in the center's living history program.

The Pennsylvania Longrifle Heritage Museum is located in the Henry Homestead.

The Henry family had a long history of rifle making going back before the French and Indian War. William Henry opened his first gun factory in Lancaster in 1750. During the French and Indian War, he was an armorer for the Braddock Campaign of 1755 and the Forbes Expedition of 1758. His son William Henry II established a small gunmaking shop in Christian Springs in 1778. He moved his operation to Jacobsburg in 1792 and built an iron forge to provide the needed iron to manufacture his rifles at Jacobsburg.

The War of 1812 lead to an increase in demand, and Henry II built a second and larger factory in Boulton, Pennsylvania. The Henry family continued manufacturing rifles for three generations.

== Ecology ==
Jacobsburg Environmental Education Center is home to the only remaining old-growth forest in the Lehigh Valley. The Henry's Woods section of the park is a largely virgin forest. Ecologists note the lack of large eastern white pines in what is otherwise a stand of old growth deciduous trees and eastern hemlock. The trees are up to 130 feet in height.

== Recreation ==
Recreational opportunities include hiking on 18.5 miles (29.8 km), fishing, biking, horseback riding, cross-country skiing, hunting, and picnicking. The walking bridge adjacent to the main parking lot was destroyed in 2004 during a flood caused by Hurricane Frances, and was replaced in 2008. The center provides an environmental education program, with classes in natural history. The center is known for its diversity of wildflowers that are especially striking during springtime. There is a heritage education program at Jacobsburg Environmental Education Center. This program displays and demonstrates early gunmaking practices. A living history program includes a mid-1840s rendezvous and military re-enactments. Blacksmith and gunsmith classes are offered and the historic buildings are open for tours.

Hunting is permitted on about 937 acres (379 ha) of Jacobsburg Environmental Education Center. The most common game species are squirrels, pheasants, rabbits and white-tailed deer. The hunting of groundhogs is prohibited.

Bushkill Creek is stocked with trout by the Pennsylvania Fish and Boat Commission.

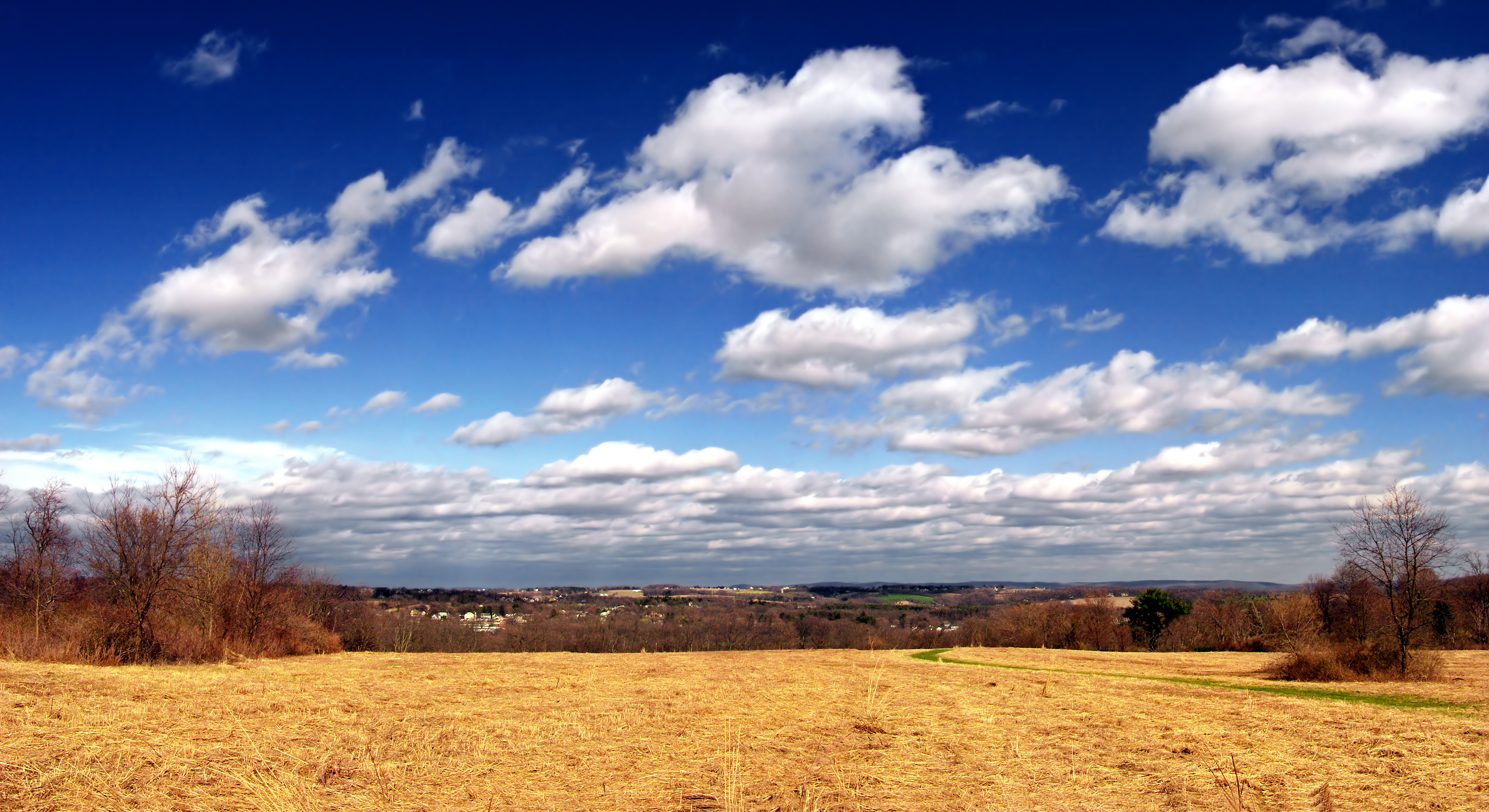
Jacobsburg Environmental Education Center
