= Bushkill =

Bushkill or Bush Kill may refer to the following geographical locations in the United States:

== Communities ==
- Bushkill, Pennsylvania
- Bushkill Center, Pennsylvania
- Bushkill Township, Pennsylvania

== Streams ==
- Big Bushkill Creek in Pennsylvania
  - Little Bush Kill, a tributary of the above creek
- Bush Kill (Esopus Creek), a tributary of Esopus Creek in New York
- Bush Kill (New York), a stream that flows into Dry Brook near Arkville
- Bushkill Creek, a tributary of the Delaware River in Pennsylvania
- Bushkill Brook, a tributary of the South Branch Raritan River in New Jersey

== Other water features ==
- Bushkill Falls
- Bushkill Swamp
