= PA33 =

PA33 may refer to:

- Pennsylvania Route 33
- Pennsylvania's 33rd congressional district
- Piper PA-33 Comanche
