= Pennsylvania Route 33 =

State highway in Pennsylvania, US

Pennsylvania Route 33
- PA 33 highlighted in red

Route information
- Maintained by PennDOT
- Length: 27.738 mi (44.640 km)
- Existed: 1972–present

Major junctions
- South end: I-78 in Lower Saucon Township
- US 22 in Bethlehem Township; PA 248 in Lower Nazareth Township; PA 191 in Stockertown; PA 512 near Wind Gap; US 209 in Hamilton Township; US 209 Bus. in Hamilton Township
- North end: I-80 / PA 611 in Stroud Township

Location
- Country: United States
- State: Pennsylvania
- Counties: Northampton, Monroe

Highway system
- Pennsylvania State Route System; Interstate; US; State; Scenic; Legislative
← PA 32	→ PA 34

Pennsylvania Route 33 (PA 33) is a 27.7-mile-long (44.6 km) freeway in eastern Pennsylvania. The highway runs from its interchange with Interstate 78 (I-78) south of Easton in the Lehigh Valley to I-80 and PA 611 west of Stroudsburg.

Until 2002, the route's southern terminus was at U.S. Route 22 (US 22), and the extension south of the US 22 interchange is known as the Gen. Anthony Clement McAuliffe Memorial Highway, named in honor of American World War II general Anthony McAuliffe. The route is commonly used as a hazmat bypass for the Pennsylvania Turnpike's Northeast Extension due to the restrictions in place on the Lehigh Tunnel. PA 33 provides a freeway connection between the Lehigh Valley and Pocono Mountains regions of Pennsylvania.

As of March 2016, PA 33 north of the US 22 interchange in Bethlehem Township was the busiest state highway or street in the Lehigh Valley with an average of 68,800 vehicles daily.

== Route description ==
=== Northampton County ===
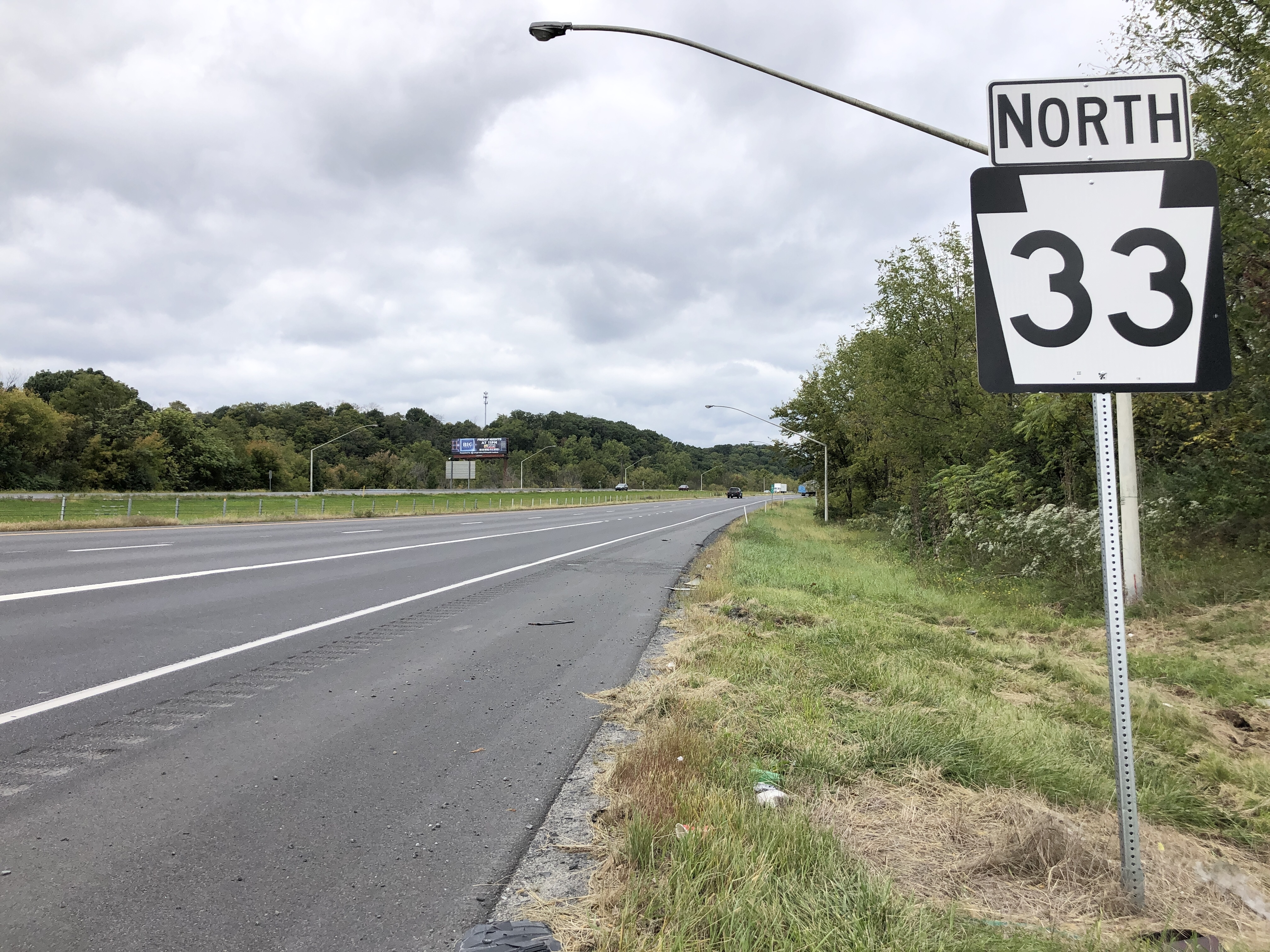
PA 33 northbound past the PA 191 interchange in Stockertown

PA 33 begins at a trumpet interchange with I-78 in Lower Saucon Township in Northampton County, which is in the Lehigh Valley. From this interchange, the route heads northwest as a four-lane freeway onto the Gene Hartzell Memorial Bridge, passing over Norfolk Southern's Lehigh Line and the Lehigh River, where the highway briefly cuts through the southwestern tip of Easton and then crosses the Lehigh Canal into Bethlehem Township. Past the bridge, the freeway passes farm fields before it comes to a partial cloverleaf interchange with Freemansburg Avenue in a business area adjacent to St. Luke's Hospital. Following this, PA 33 curves north near commercial development and reaches a diamond interchange with William Penn Highway, with a park and ride lot located at the northwest quadrant of this interchange. The route heads near a mix of residential development and farmland, curving northeast before turning north and coming to a cloverleaf interchange with the US 22 freeway.

After the US 22 interchange, the freeway crosses into Lower Nazareth Township and reaches a half-folded diamond interchange with Hecktown Road. PA 33 continues north past farm fields and curves northeast as it comes to a partial cloverleaf interchange with PA 248 in a business area.

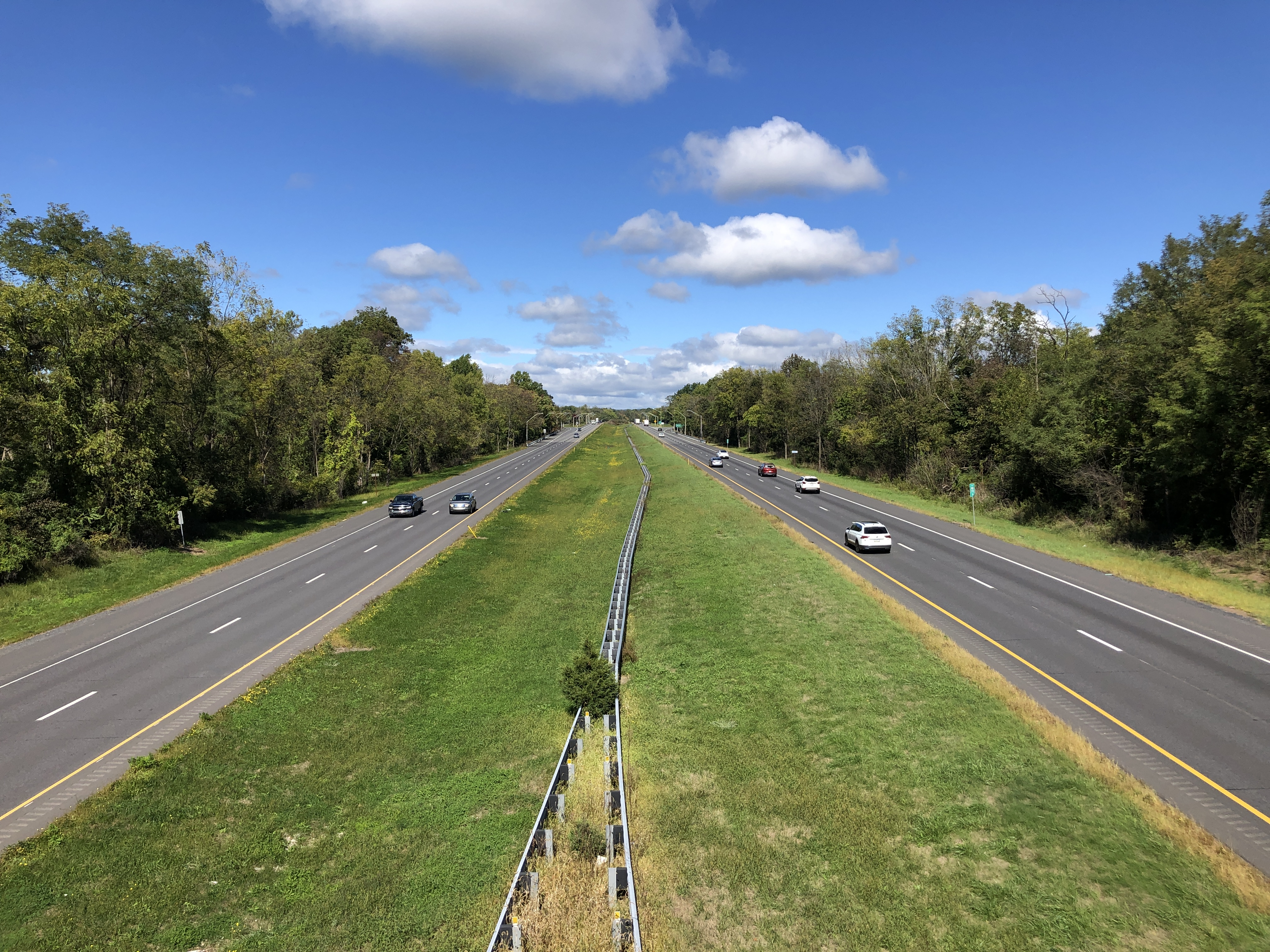
PA 33 northbound in Plainfield Township

The route enters Palmer Township and runs through a mix of farm fields and industrial development, coming to a diamond interchange with Main Street that serves Tatamy and the warehouse district to the east. The freeway curves north and crosses Bushkill Creek into Stockertown, where it passes over Norfolk Southern's Cement Secondary line and a railroad spur and turns northwest to reach a diamond interchange with PA 191. PA 33 continues past industrial areas and leaves Stockertown for Plainfield Township, passing over a Norfolk Southern railroad spur. The route heads into wooded areas and crosses into Bushkill Township, where it reaches a diamond interchange with Henry Road serving Belfast to the east. A park and ride lot is located within the southeast quadrant of this interchange.

Past this interchange, the freeway heads east of the Jacobsburg Environmental Education Center as it continues through woodland with some farm fields and residential development. PA 33 turns north and crosses back into Plainfield Township, where it comes to a partial cloverleaf interchange with PA 512 in an area of businesses that serves Wind Gap. Past this interchange, the freeway heads into forested areas, heading through a gap in the Blue Mountain ridge, with a partial diamond interchange with Broadway (Old PA 115) providing southbound access to Wind Gap and the Appalachian Trail.

=== Monroe County ===
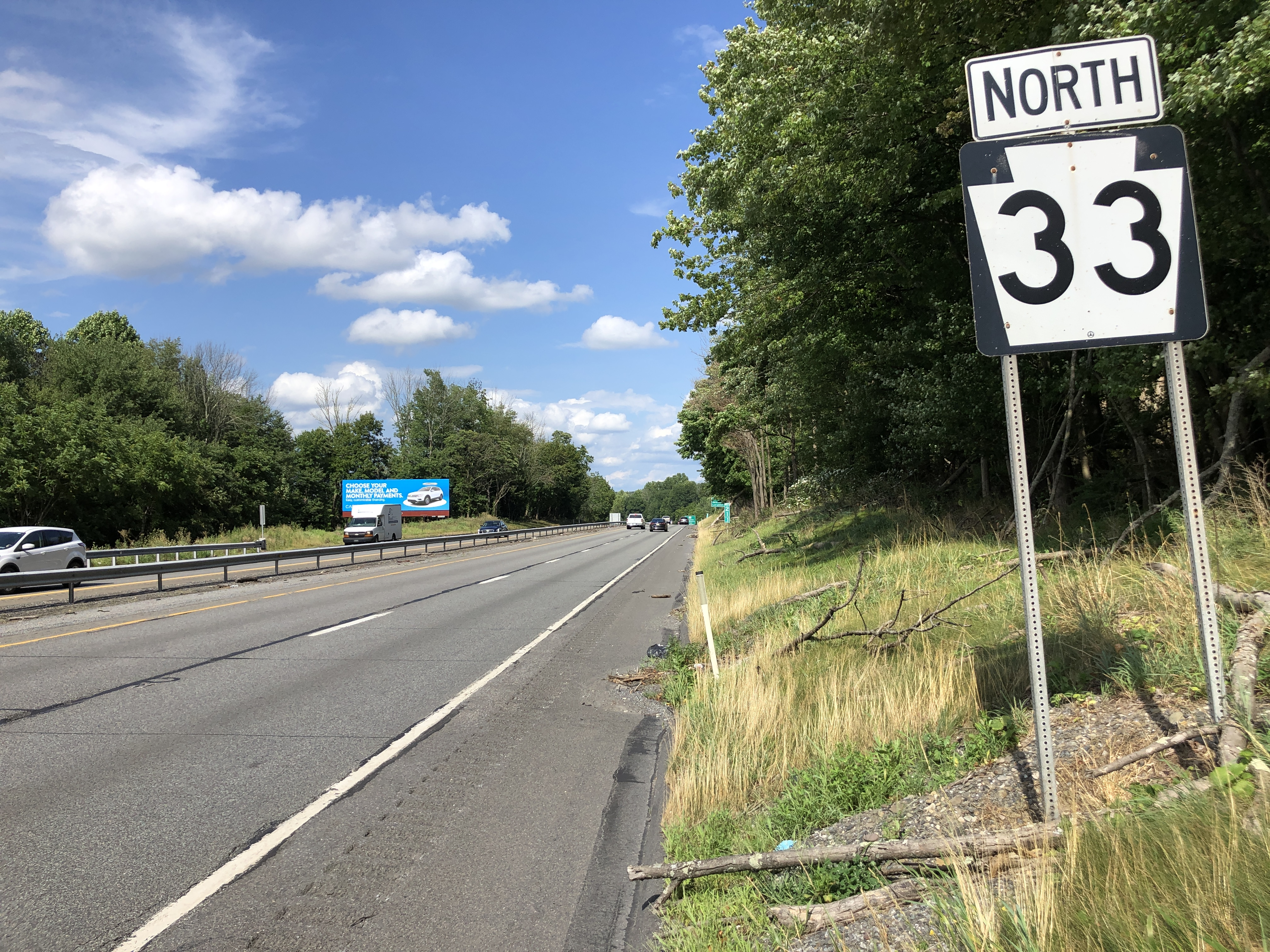
PA 33 northbound past Cherry Valley Road in Hamilton Township

PA 33 crosses into Hamilton Township and continues through forested areas, turning northwest and briefly entering Ross Township before curving back northeast as it passes west of a section of the Cherry Valley National Wildlife Refuge. The route reaches Saylorsburg, where a southbound exit and entrance connects to Wilkes Barre Turnpike (Old PA 115), and a northbound exit and entrance connects to Cherry Valley Road. From here, PA 33 turns northeast and runs through wooded areas with some fields and homes, soon making a curve to the north at a trumpet interchange with US 209, at which point US 209 joins PA 33 in a concurrency on the freeway. The two routes continue northeast through woodland with some development, crossing McMichael Creek and coming to a diamond interchange with Manor Drive that serves Snydersville.

From here, the freeway passes west of Monroe County Correctional Facility and crosses Appenzell Creek before PA 33 exits northbound from the US 209 expressway, with signs leading travelers to eastbound and from westbound I-80 via US 209. After this, PA 33 reaches a southbound exit and northbound entrance with US 209 Bus. that serves Snydersville. The route continues northeast through wooded areas, passing to the northwest of Snydersville Raceway before turning north. The freeway heads through forested areas with some homes, curving to the north-northeast and crossing Pocono Creek. The route comes to a partial interchange with I-80, with no access from northbound PA 33 to eastbound I-80 or from westbound I-80 to southbound PA 33, the missing movements being provided by US 209 at the freeway split. Past this, PA 33 crosses into Stroud Township and reaches its northern terminus at an at-grade traffic light with PA 611 in a business area.

== History ==
=== 20th century ===
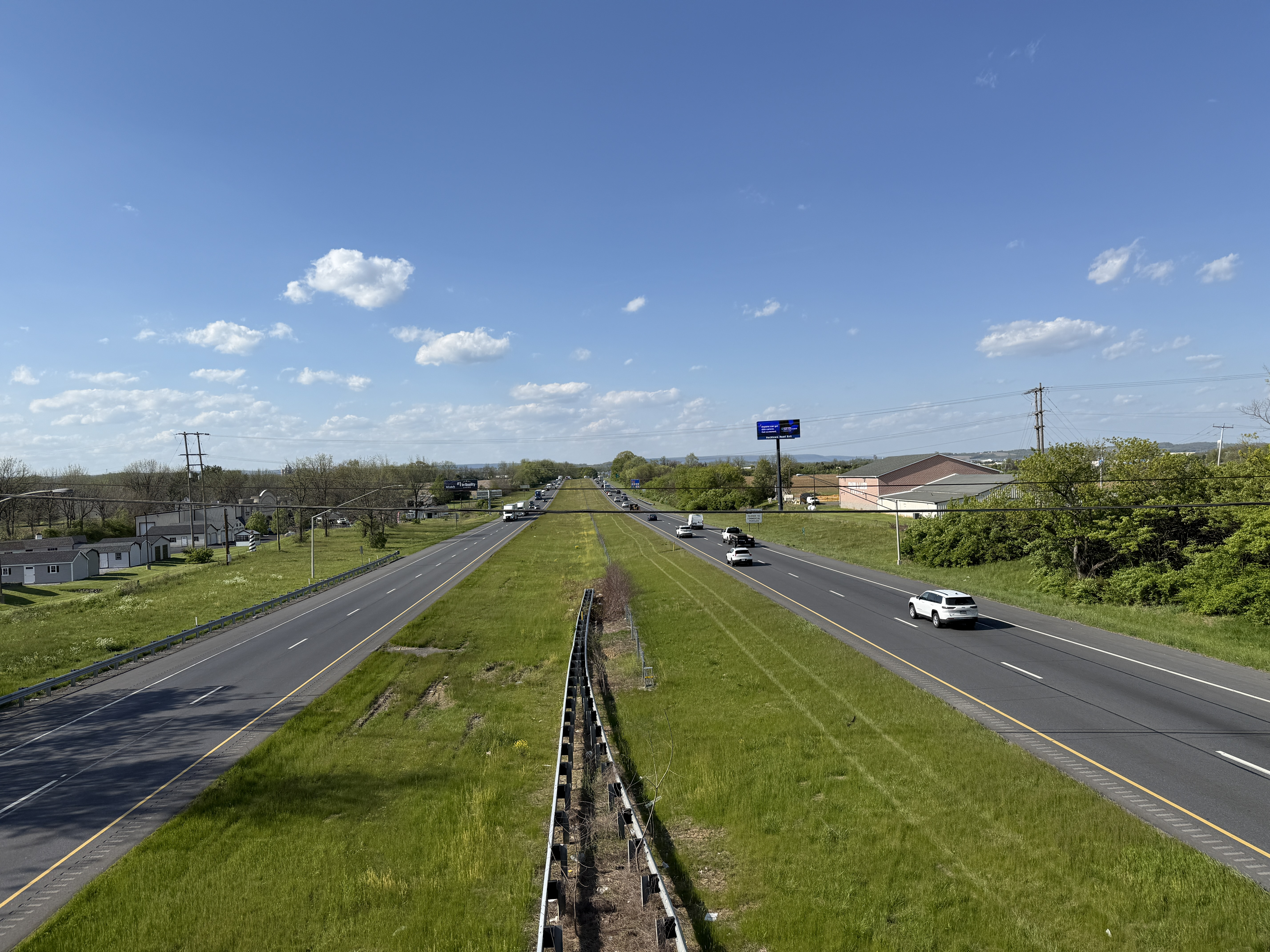
PA 33 northbound in Lower Nazareth Township

The construction of PA 33 started in 1959, and stretched from the PA 512 interchange to Saylorsburg. Construction finished in 1960. The stretch connecting the highway to I-80 was built and completed by 1964. Construction on PA 33 was not continued until 1969, when work began on the stretch from PA 512 in Wind Gap to Henry Road in Belfast. This stretch was completed by 1970. By 1972, the road had reached what is now PA 191 in Stockertown, and was extended down to its long-term southern terminus at US 22. The highway was left at that until 1999 when construction began on a final segment that would connect the US 22 interchange to I-78. The final three-mile (5 km) stretch opened in January 2002.

=== 21st century ===
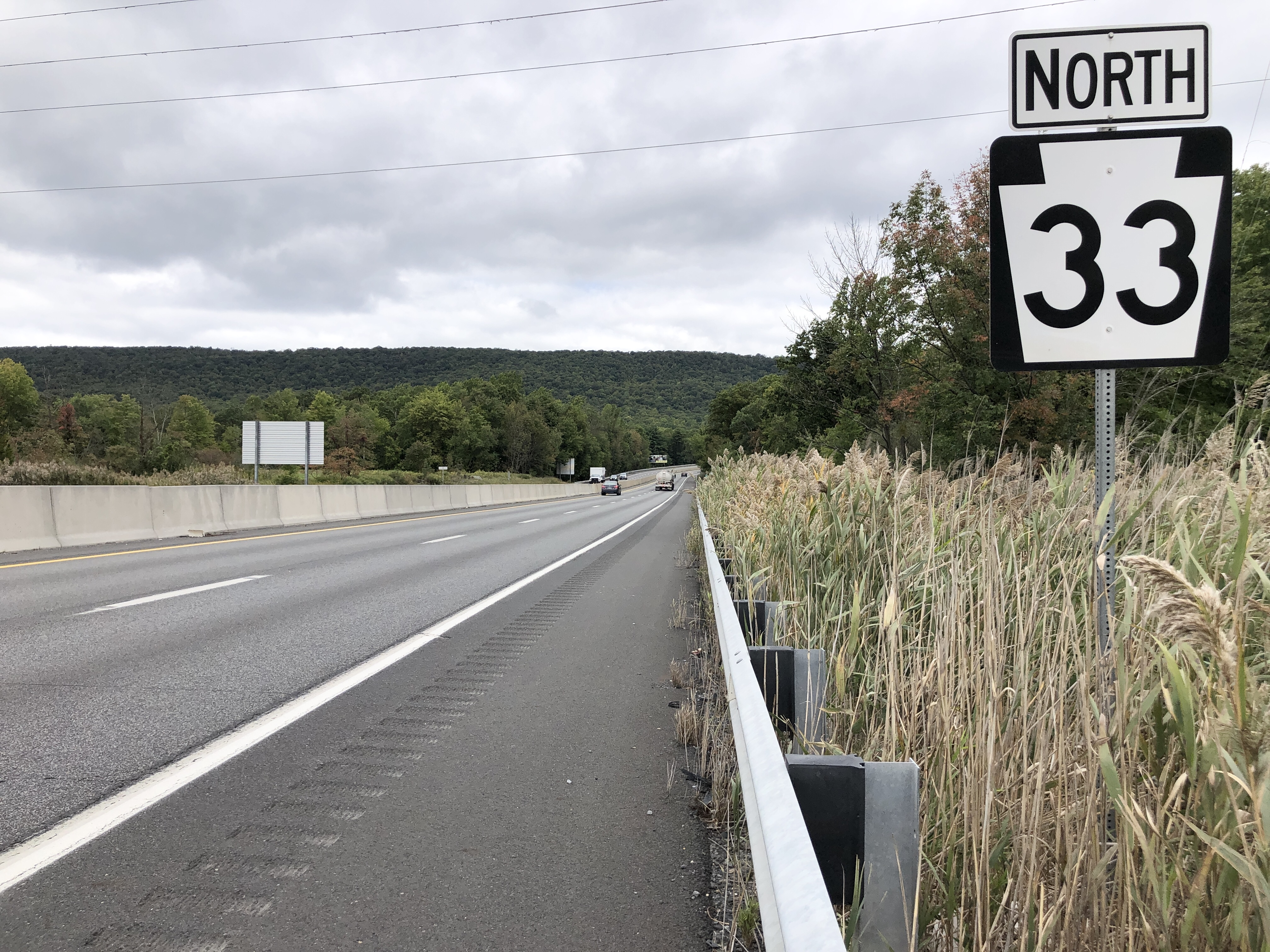
PA 33 northbound past the PA 512 interchange in Wind Gap, approaching Blue Mountain

In January 2004, the freeway was shut down between Lower Nazareth Township (PA 248) and Stockertown (PA 191) because of a sinkhole that was in the area of the Bushkill Creek directly under a northbound bridge support beam. Crossovers were created, narrowing the highway to one lane in each direction through Stockertown. Studies were conducted, and came to the conclusion that the bridge was dangerous and could not be fixed. The northbound bridge was demolished in February of the same year. Just 21 days later, a sinkhole was discovered under the southbound bridge over the Bushkill Creek, which resulted in the demolition of the southbound bridge. Once the new northbound bridge was completed, another crossover was created, detouring southbound traffic onto the northbound side of the highway. On April 21, 2004, a depression formed under the new northbound bridge, and the highway was shut down once again to fill the area with bituminous material. The bridge reopened within twenty minutes. By November 19, 2004, both bridges were completed and opened. All of this happened feet from the Bushkill Street Bridge connecting Stockertown and Palmer Township, which has been closed since 1999 because of numerous sinkholes causing the bridge to collapse.

On March 21, 2009, a tractor-trailer carrying 32,000 pounds of hydrofluoric acid overturned on southbound PA 33 in Plainfield Township, prompting the evacuation of about 5,000 people. The truck, registered to the Honeywell company, flipped over at about 2:40 a.m. after the driver swerved to avoid a deer. No one was injured, and the highway was reopened later that day. Hundreds of evacuees were taken to the Pen Argyl Area High School in nearby Pen Argyl.

On January 31, 2013, ground was broken for a new interchange at Main Street in Palmer Township to the west of Tatamy, with Governor Tom Corbett in attendance. This interchange is being constructed to serve the Palmer Industrial Park and is expected to bring economic development to the area. Completion of this interchange, which is to cost $40 million, was originally planned for November 2014. However, work on the project was halted during the winter of 2014–2015, with completion pushed back to June 2015.

=== Future ===
PennDOT eventually intends to have PA 33 resigned as an interstate highway. As of June 2026, it has twice attempted to submit a request to the American Association of State Highway and Transportation Officials (AASHTO), without success. AASHTO has cited "deficiencies of geometrics" as reasoning for its denial. No number has yet been proposed.

== Exit list ==
All exits are unnumbered.

County	Location	mi	km	Destinations	Notes
Northampton	Lower Saucon Township	0.000	0.000	I-78 – New Jersey, New York City, Allentown, Harrisburg	Southern terminus; exit 71 on I-78
Northampton	Bethlehem Township	1.147	1.846	Freemansburg Avenue	
Northampton	Bethlehem Township	2.148	3.457	William Penn Highway	Access to Easton Avenue
Northampton	Bethlehem Township	3.324	5.349	US 22 – Easton, Bethlehem, Allentown	Allentown not signed northbound; access to Lehigh Valley International Airport
Northampton	Lower Nazareth Township	4.315	6.944	Hecktown Road	
Northampton	Lower Nazareth Township	5.678	9.138	PA 248 – Nazareth, Wilson	Nazareth not signed southbound
Northampton	Palmer Township	7.626	12.273	Tatamy	Access via Main Street
Northampton	Stockertown	8.814	14.185	PA 191 – Stockertown, Bangor, Nazareth	Signed for Bangor northbound, Nazareth southbound
Northampton	Bushkill Township	10.598	17.056	Belfast	Access via Henry Road
Northampton	Plainfield Township	14.603	23.501	PA 512 – Bath, Wind Gap	
Northampton	Wind Gap	16.735	26.932	Wind Gap	Southbound exit and northbound entrance; access via Broadway
Monroe	Hamilton Township	19.727	31.748	Saylorsburg	Access via Cherry Valley Road/Old PA 115
Monroe	Hamilton Township	22.209	35.742	US 209 south – Lehighton	Southern end of US 209 concurrency; access to Sciota and Brodheadsville
Monroe	Hamilton Township	23.821	38.336	Snydersville	Access via Manor Drive
Monroe	Hamilton Township	24.465	39.373	US 209 north to I-80 east – Stroudsburg	Northbound exit and southbound entrance; northern end of US 209 concurrency
Monroe	Hamilton Township	24.838	39.973	US 209 Bus. – Snydersville	Southbound exit and northbound entrance; no tractor trailers
Monroe	Hamilton Township	27.558	44.350	I-80 to US 209 north – Hazleton, Stroudsburg	No northbound access to I-80 east; exit 302A on I-80
Monroe	Stroud Township	27.738	44.640	PA 611 (North Ninth Street) – Bartonsville, Stroudsburg	Northern terminus; at-grade intersection
1.000 mi = 1.609 km; 1.000 km = 0.621 mi: Concurrency terminus; Incomplete access
