= Bushkill Township, Pennsylvania =

Township in Pennsylvania, US

- Township
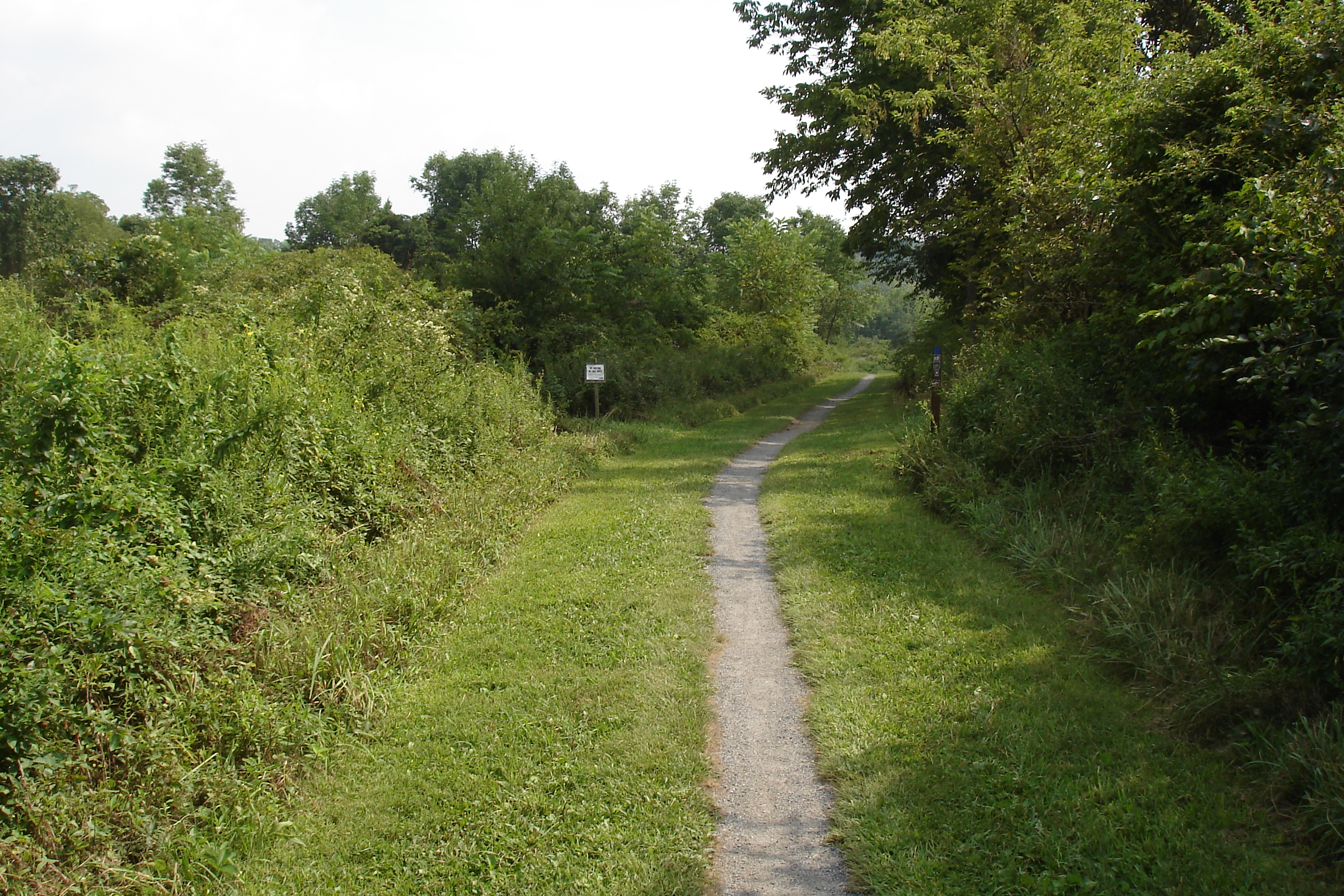
- A trail in Jacobsburg Environmental Education Center, a Pennsylvania state park in the township

- Seal

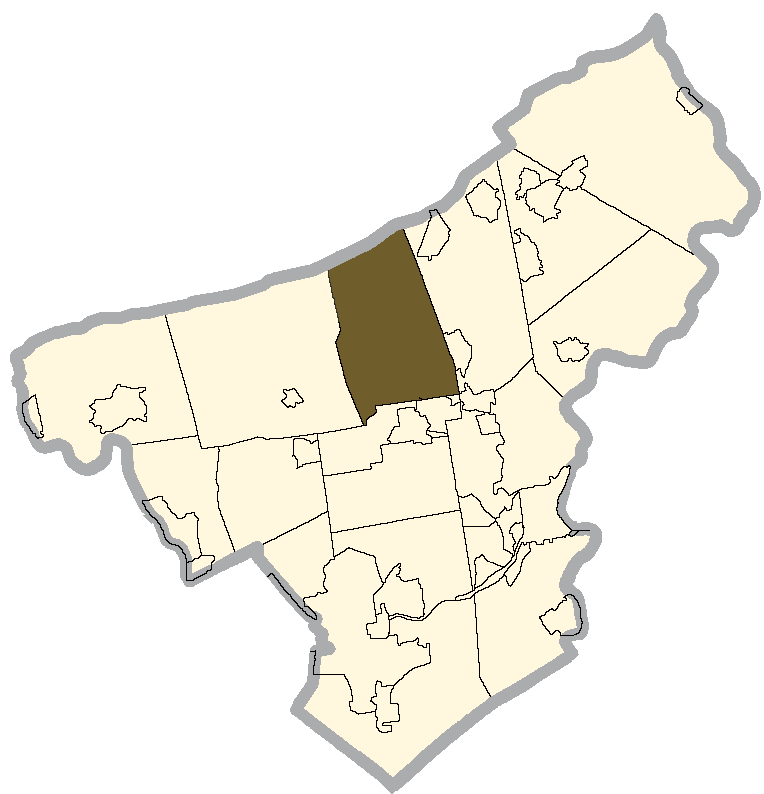
- Location of Bushkill Township in Northampton County, Pennsylvania

- Location of Bushkill Township in Pennsylvania
- Coordinates: 40°44′59″N 75°20′29″W
- Country: United States
- State: Pennsylvania
- County: Northampton
- Founded: 1813

Area
  - Township: 25.25 sq mi (65.40 km^{2})
  - Land: 24.93 sq mi (64.56 km^{2})
  - Water: 0.32 sq mi (0.84 km^{2})
- Elevation: 659 ft (201 m)

Population (2020)
  - Township: 8,490
  - Estimate (2023): 8,649
  - Density: 339.0/sq mi (130.89/km^{2})
  - Metro: 865,310 (US: 68th)
- Time zone: UTC-5 (EST)
  - Summer (DST): UTC-4 (EDT)
- Area code: 610
- FIPS code: 42-095-10400
- Primary airport: Lehigh Valley International Airport
- Major hospital: Lehigh Valley Hospital–Cedar Crest
- School district: Nazareth Area
- Website: www.bushkilltownship.com

Bushkill Township is a township in Northampton County, Pennsylvania, United States. Its population was 8,490 at the 2020 census. It is part of the Lehigh Valley metropolitan area, which had a population of 861,899 and was the 68th-most populous metropolitan area in the U.S. as of the 2020 census.

== Geography ==
According to the U.S. Census Bureau, the township has a total area of 25.3 square miles (66 km^{2}), of which 25.3 square miles (66 km^{2}) is land and 0.1 square miles (0.26 km^{2}) (0.20%) is water. It is in the Delaware River watershed and is drained by the Bushkill Creek, except for a very small area in the southwest drained by the Mononacy Creek into the Lehigh River.

Blue Mountain forms its natural northern boundary. Its villages include Bushkill Center, Cherry Hill, Clearfield, Copella (also in Moore Township,) Katellen, and Rismiller.

=== Neighboring municipalities ===
- Moore Township (west)
- Upper Nazareth Township (south)
- Plainfield Township (east)
- Ross Township, Monroe County (north)

== Demographics ==
Historical population
Census	Pop.	Note	%±
2000	6,982		—
2010	8,178		17.1%
2020	8,490		3.8%
2023 (est.)	8,649		1.9%
U.S. Decennial Census

As of the census of 2000, there were 6,982 people, 2,333 households, and 2,011 families residing in the township. The population density was 276.1 inhabitants per square mile (106.6/km^{2}). There were 2,406 housing units at an average density of 95.2 units per square mile (36.8 units/km^{2}). The racial makeup of the township was 98.27% White, 0.19% African American, 0.24% Native American, 0.39% Asian, 0.34% from other races, and 0.57% from two or more races. Hispanic or Latino of any race were 1.00% of the population.

There were 2,333 households, out of which 42.0% had children under the age of 18 living with them, 76.4% were married couples living together, 6.1% had a female householder with no husband present, and 13.8% were non-families. 11.1% of all households were made up of individuals, and 5.2% had someone living alone who was 65 years of age or older. The average household size was 2.99 and the average family size was 3.22.

In the township, the population was spread out, with 28.1% under the age of 18, 5.9% from 18 to 24, 29.8% from 25 to 44, 26.9% from 45 to 64, and 9.3% who were 65 years of age or older. The median age was 38 years. For every 100 females, there were 101.0 males. For every 100 females age 18 and over, there were 99.2 males.

The median income for a household in the township was $63,966, and the median income for a family was $67,649. Males had a median income of $42,097 versus $30,275 for females. The per capita income for the township was $23,569. About 1.9% of families and 3.1% of the population were below the poverty line, including 1.3% of those under age 18 and 10.3% of those age 65 or over.

== Transportation ==
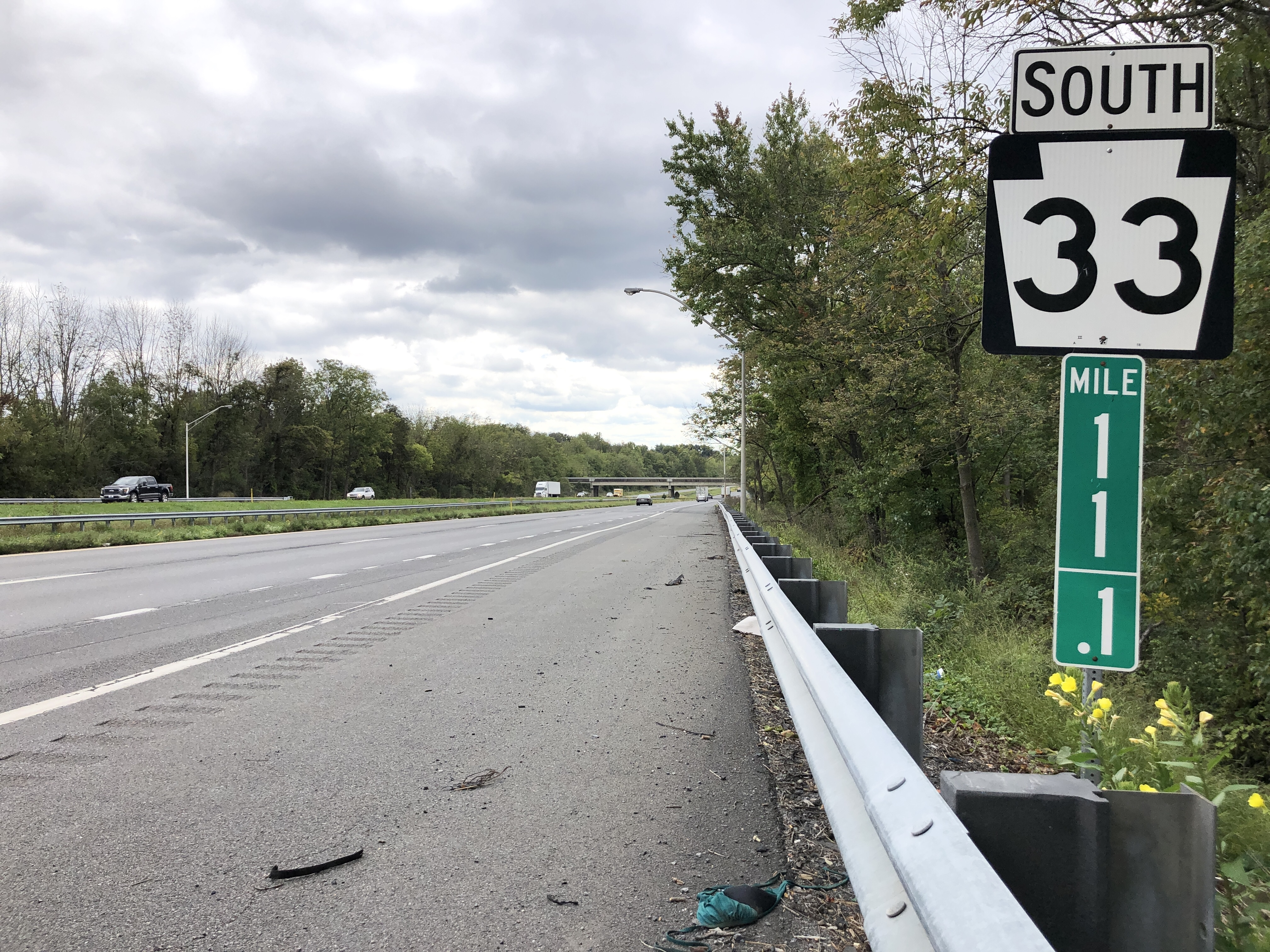
PA Route 33 South in Bushkill Township

As of 2016, there were 93.91 miles (151.13 km) of public roads in Bushkill Township, of which 35.67 miles (57.41 km) were maintained by the Pennsylvania Department of Transportation (PennDOT) and 58.24 miles (93.73 km) were maintained by the township.

Pennsylvania Route 33, Pennsylvania Route 512, and Pennsylvania Route 946 are the numbered highways serving Bushkill Township. PA 33 follows a north–south alignment along the eastern edge of the township, PA 512 follows a northeast–southwest alignment across the northern and western portions of the township, and PA 946 follows a northwest–southeast alignment across the far southwestern corner of the township.

== Education ==
Bushkill Township is served by the Nazareth Area School District. High school students attend Nazareth Area High School in Nazareth. Middle school students attend Nazareth Area Middle School.

== Public safety ==
Bushkill Township Volunteer Fire Company provides fire rescue services and Cetronia EMS provides basic and advanced life support services to all residents and travelers in the township.
