= Ross Township, Pennsylvania =

Ross Township is the name of some places in Pennsylvania:

- Ross Township, Allegheny County, Pennsylvania
- Ross Township, Luzerne County, Pennsylvania
- Ross Township, Monroe County, Pennsylvania
