= Plainfield Township, Pennsylvania =

Borough in Pennsylvania, US

Plainfield Township
- Township
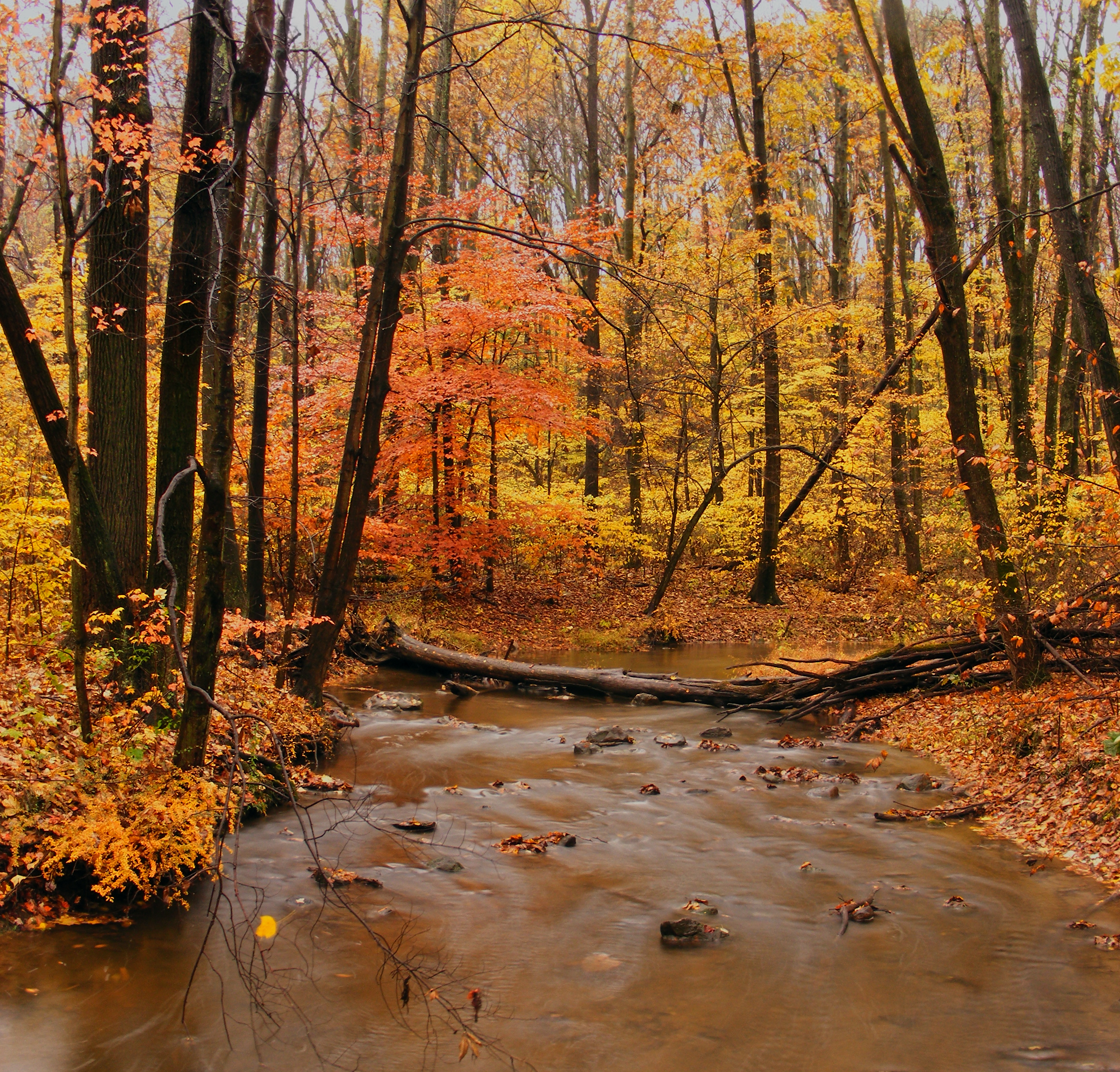
- Bushkill Creek in Plainfield Township in October 2010

- Flag Seal

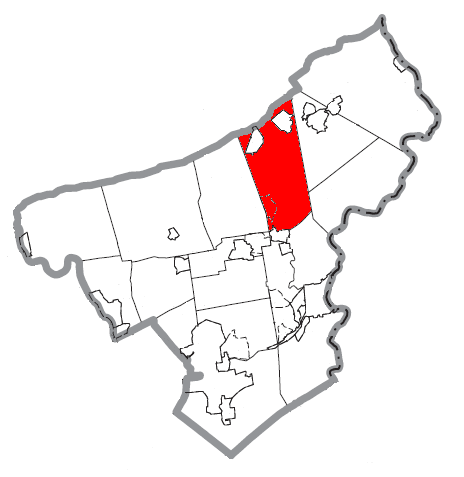
- Location of Plainfield Township in Northampton County, Pennsylvania

- Location of Pennsylvania in the United States
- Coordinates: 40°50′00″N 75°15′59″W
- Country: United States
- State: Pennsylvania
- County: Northampton

Area
  - Township: 24.98 sq mi (64.69 km^{2})
  - Land: 24.75 sq mi (64.11 km^{2})
  - Water: 0.22 sq mi (0.58 km^{2})
- Elevation: 568 ft (173 m)

Population (2010)
  - Township: 6,138
  - Estimate (2016): 6,153
  - Density: 248.6/sq mi (95.97/km^{2})
  - Metro: 865,310 (US: 68th)
- Time zone: UTC-5 (EST)
  - Summer (DST): UTC-4 (EDT)
- Area code: 610
- FIPS code: 42-095-61088
- Primary airport: Lehigh Valley International Airport
- Major hospital: Lehigh Valley Hospital–Cedar Crest
- School district: Pen Argyl Area
- Website: plainfieldtownship.org

Plainfield Township is a township in Northampton County, Pennsylvania, United States. The population of Plainfield Township was 6,138 at the 2010 census. The township is part of the Lehigh Valley metropolitan area, which had a population of 861,899 and was the 68th-most populous metropolitan area in the U.S. as of the 2020 census.

== Geography ==
According to the U.S. Census Bureau, the township has a total area of 24.8 square miles (64 km^{2}), 24.7 square miles (64 km^{2}) of which is land and 0.04 square miles (0.10 km^{2}), or 0.16%, of which is water. It is located in the Delaware River watershed and drained by Bushkill Creek and Martins Creek. Its natural northern boundary is Blue Mountain. Its seven villages are Belfast, Delabole, Edelman, Kesslersville, Miller, West Bangor, and West Pen Argyl.

=== Neighboring municipalities ===
- Bushkill Township (west)
- Upper Nazareth Township (southwest)
- Stockertown (southwest)
- Forks Township (south)
- Lower Mount Bethel Township (southeast)
- Washington Township (east)
- Hamilton Township, Monroe County (north)
- Ross Township, Monroe County (northwest)

Plainfield Township surrounds Pen Argyl in the northeast and nearly surrounds Wind Gap in the northwest.

== Transportation ==
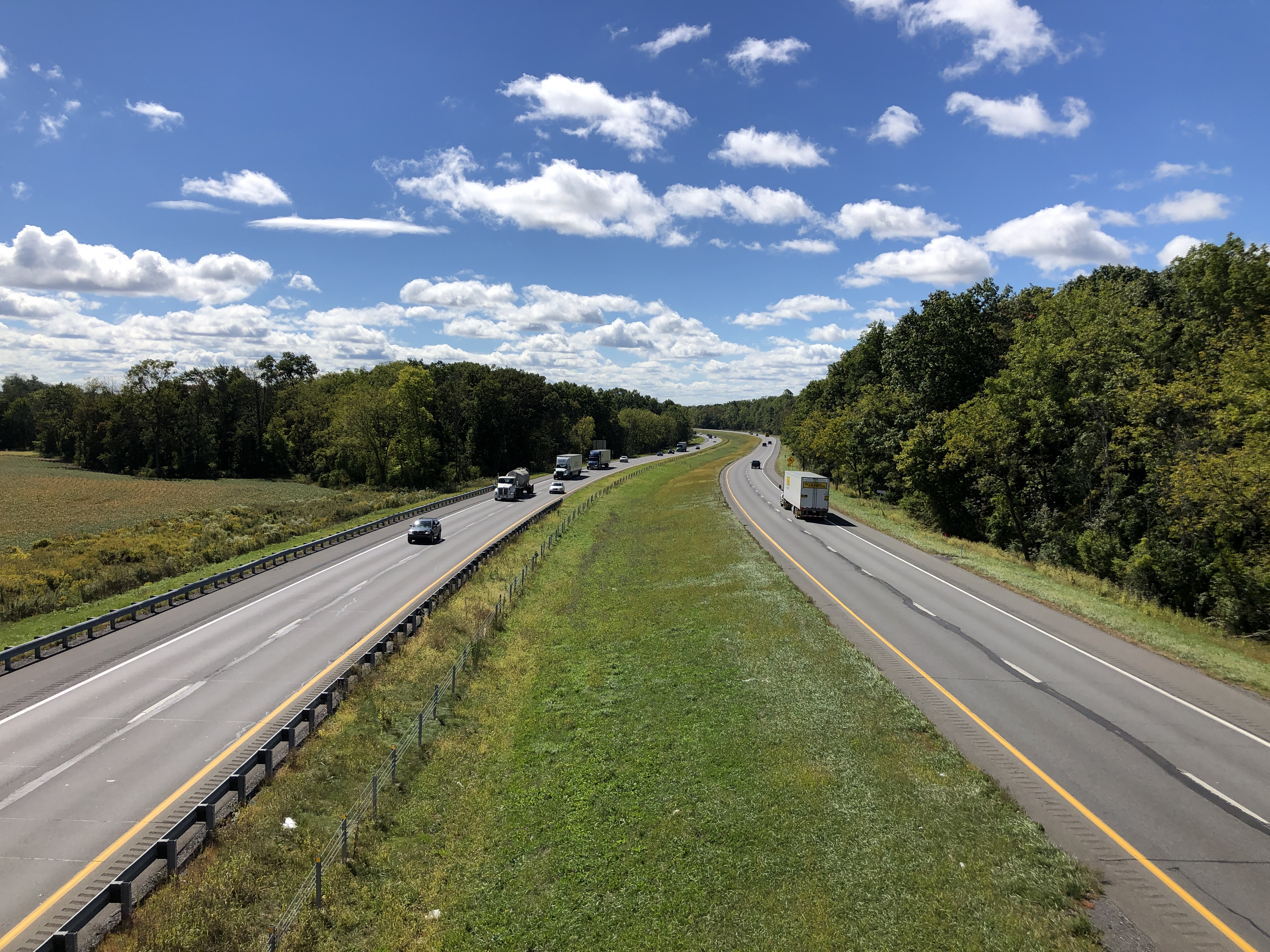
PA Route 33 South in Plainfield Township

As of 2015, there were 86.38 miles (139.02 km) of public roads in Plainfield Township, of which 34.23 miles (55.09 km) were maintained by the Pennsylvania Department of Transportation (PennDOT) and 52.15 miles (83.93 km) were maintained by the township.

Pennsylvania Route 33 is the most prominent highway serving Plainfield Township. It follows a north-south alignment across the western portion of the township. Pennsylvania Route 191 follows a southwest-northeast alignment through the southern and eastern portions of the township. Pennsylvania Route 512 also follows a southwest-northeast alignment, but through the northern and western parts of the township.

== Demographics ==
Historical population
Census	Pop.	Note	%±
2000	5,668		—
2010	6,138		8.3%
2016 (est.)	6,153		0.2%
U.S. Decennial Census

As of the census of 2000, there were 5,668 people, 2,130 households, and 1,637 families residing in the township. The population density was 229.2 inhabitants per square mile (88.5/km^{2}). There were 2,191 housing units at an average density of 88.6 per square mile (34.2/km^{2}). The racial makeup of the township was 98.85% White, 0.37% African American, 0.02% Native American, 0.28% Asian, 0.14% from other races, and 0.34% from two or more races. Hispanic or Latino of any race were 0.67% of the population.

There were 2,130 households, out of which 30.4% had children under the age of 18 living with them, 68.0% were married couples living together, 5.6% had a female householder with no husband present, and 23.1% were non-families. 18.6% of all households were made up of individuals, and 9.0% had someone living alone who was 65 years of age or older. The average household size was 2.62 and the average family size was 3.00.

In the township, the population was spread out, with 22.2% under the age of 18, 6.1% from 18 to 24, 27.1% from 25 to 44, 27.8% from 45 to 64, and 16.7% who were 65 years of age or older. The median age was 42 years. For every 100 females, there were 96.9 males. For every 100 females age 18 and over, there were 93.2 males.

The median income for a household in the township was $49,019, and the median income for a family was $54,856. Males had a median income of $39,334 versus $25,145 for females. The per capita income for the township was $20,639. About 1.7% of families and 3.7% of the population were below the poverty line, including 2.9% of those under age 18 and 4.9% of those age 65 or over.

== Education ==
The township is served by the Pen Argyl Area School District. Students in grades nine through 12 attend Pen Argyl Area High School in Pen Argyl.
