= Lower Nazareth Township, Pennsylvania =

Township in Pennsylvania, US

Lower Nazareth Township
- Township
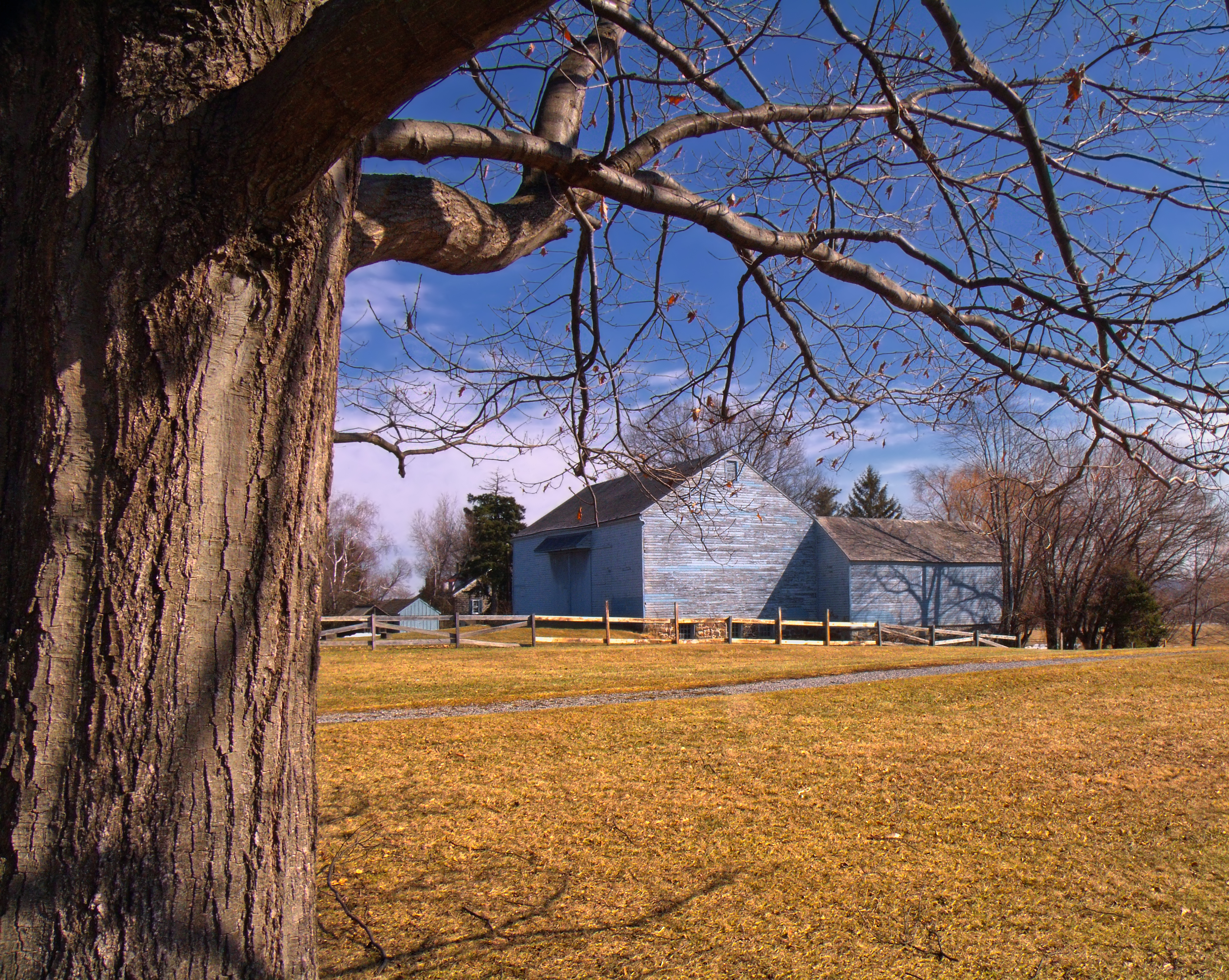
- Louise W. Moore Park in Lower Nazareth Township in February 2011

- Seal
- Interactive map of Lower Nazareth Township
- Coordinates: 40°42′30″N 75°22′36″W
- Country: United States
- State: Pennsylvania
- County: Northampton
- Founded: 1807

Area
  - Township: 13.59 sq mi (35.19 km^{2})
  - Land: 13.46 sq mi (34.87 km^{2})
  - Water: 0.12 sq mi (0.32 km^{2})
- Elevation: 397 ft (121 m)

Population (2010)
  - Township: 5,674
  - Estimate (2016): 6,111
  - Density: 453.8/sq mi (175.23/km^{2})
  - Metro: 865,310 (US: 68th)
- Time zone: UTC-5 (EST)
  - Summer (DST): UTC-4 (EDT)
- Area code: 610
- FIPS code: 42-095-45024
- Primary airport: Lehigh Valley International Airport
- Major hospital: Lehigh Valley Hospital–Cedar Crest
- School district: Nazareth Area
- Website: www.lowernazareth.com

Lower Nazareth Township is a township in Northampton County, Pennsylvania, United States. The population of Lower Nazareth Township was 5,674 at the 2010 census. The township is located in the Lehigh Valley, which had a population of 861,899 and was the 68th-most populous metropolitan area in the U.S. as of the 2020 census.

== Geography ==
According to the U.S. Census Bureau, the township has a total area of 13.4 square miles (34.7 km^{2}), all land. It is in the Delaware watershed and is drained by two Lehigh River tributaries, Monocacy Creek and Bushkill Creek. Its six villages include Georgetown, Hecktown, Hollo, Newburg, Newburg Homes, and Steuben.

=== Neighboring municipalities ===
- Upper Nazareth Township (north)
- Nazareth (north)
- Palmer Township (east)
- Bethlehem Township (south)
- Hanover Township (southwest)
- East Allen Township (west)

== Demographics ==
Historical population
Census	Pop.	Note	%±
2000	5,259		—
2010	5,674		7.9%
2016 (est.)	6,111		7.7%
U.S. Decennial Census

As of the 2000 census, of there were 5,259 people, 1,788 households, and 1,534 families residing in the township. The population density was 392.5 inhabitants per square mile (151.5/km^{2}). There were 1,821 housing units at an average density of 135.9 per square mile (52.5/km^{2}). The racial makeup of the township was 96.98% White, 0.89% African American, 0.17% Native American, 1.20% Asian, 0.13% from other races, and 0.63% from two or more races. Hispanic or Latino of any race were 1.39% of the population.

There were 1,788 households, out of which 41.8% had children under the age of 18 living with them, 77.8% were married couples living together, 5.5% had a female householder with no husband present, and 14.2% were non-families. 11.5% of all households were made up of individuals, and 5.2% had someone living alone who was 65 years of age or older. The average household size was 2.94 and the average family size was 3.19.

In the township, the population was spread out, with 27.6% under the age of 18, 6.2% from 18 to 24, 26.2% from 25 to 44, 30.8% from 45 to 64, and 9.1% who were 65 years of age or older. The median age was 40 years. For every 100 females, there were 99.6 males. For every 100 females age 18 and over, there were 98.0 males.

The median income for a household in the township was $70,250, and the median income for a family was $76,193. Males had a median income of $48,343 versus $31,956 for females. The per capita income for the township was $26,624. About 1.5% of families and 2.1% of the population were below the poverty line, including 1.3% of those under age 18 and 7.7% of those age 65 or over.

== Education ==
The Township is served by the Nazareth Area School District. High school students attend Nazareth Area High School in Nazareth. Middle school students attend Nazareth Area Middle School.

== Transportation ==
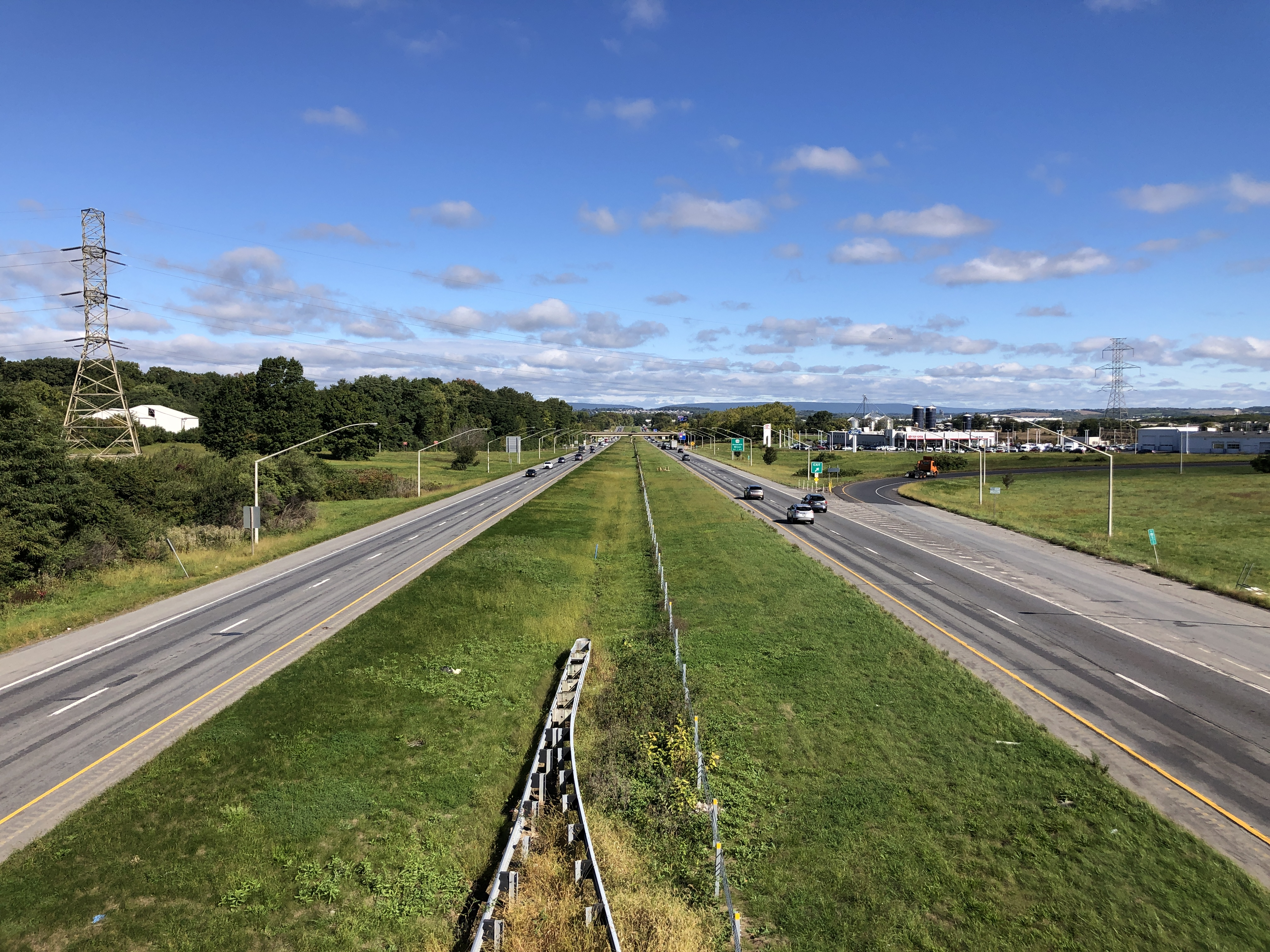
PA Route 33 North in Lower Nazareth Township

As of 2021, there were 63.92 miles (102.87 km) of public roads in Lower Nazareth Township, of which 14.34 miles (23.08 km) were maintained by the Pennsylvania Department of Transportation (PennDOT) and 49.58 miles (79.79 km) were maintained by the township.

Pennsylvania Route 33 is the most prominent highway serving Lower Nazareth Township. It follows a north–south alignment across the eastern portion of the township. Pennsylvania Route 191 follows the Nazareth Pike along a southwest–northeast alignment through the middle of the township. Pennsylvania Route 248 follows Easton-Nazareth Highway along a northwest–southeast alignment across the northeastern portion of the township. Pennsylvania Route 946 begins at PA 191 in the center of the township and heads northwestward along Daniels Road. Other notable local roads include Georgetown Road, Hanoverville Road/Hecktown Road, Newburg Road, Steuben Road, and Township Line Road.

== In popular culture ==
- On Season 4, Episode 9 of the HBO series The Sopranos, titled "Whoever Did This", which aired initially on November 10, 2002, the scene in which Christopher Moltisanti is ordered by Tony Soprano to dispose of the remains of Ralph Cifaretto after Tony kills him were filmed in Lower Nazareth Township.
