= Upper Nazareth Township, Pennsylvania =

Borough in Pennsylvania, US

Upper Nazareth Township
- Township
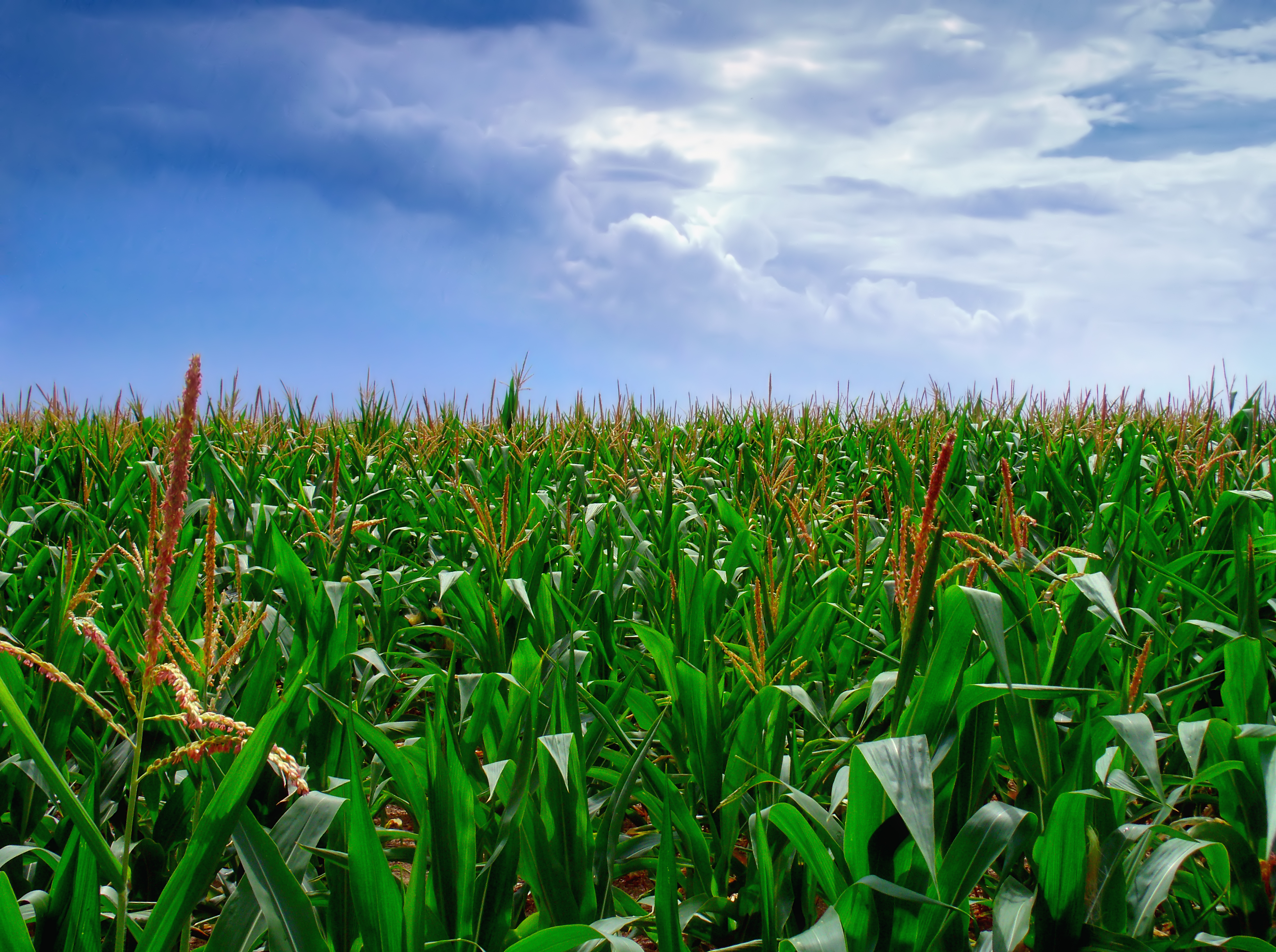
- Cornfield in Upper Nazareth Township in July 2012

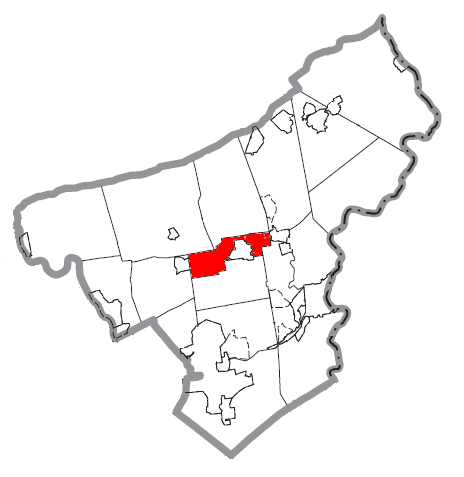
- Location of Upper Nazareth Township in Northampton County, Pennsylvania

- Location of Pennsylvania in the United States
- Coordinates: 40°43′30″N 75°22′30″W
- Country: United States
- State: Pennsylvania
- County: Northampton

Area
  - Township: 7.45 sq mi (19.30 km^{2})
  - Land: 7.31 sq mi (18.94 km^{2})
  - Water: 0.14 sq mi (0.36 km^{2})
- Elevation: 413 ft (126 m)

Population (2020)
  - Township: 8,127
  - Density: 1,111.6/sq mi (429.18/km^{2})
  - Metro: 865,310 (US: 68th)
- Time zone: UTC-5 (EST)
  - Summer (DST): UTC-4 (EDT)
- Area code: 610
- FIPS code: 42-095-79192
- Primary airport: Lehigh Valley International Airport
- Major hospital: Lehigh Valley Hospital–Cedar Crest
- School district: Nazareth Area
- Website: www.uppernazarethtownship.org

Upper Nazareth Township is a township in Northampton County, Pennsylvania, United States. It is part of the Lehigh Valley metropolitan area, which had a population of 861,899 and was the 68th-most populous metropolitan area in the U.S. as of the 2020 census. At the 2020 census, Upper Nazareth Township's population was 8,127.

The township spans from the Stockertown Borough western border, wrapping most of the way Nazareth westward toward Bath. Most of the township's population is centered in the part of the township that lies northeast of Nazareth, an area and census designated place commonly referred to as East Lawn, or East Lawn Gardens.

Pennsylvania Route 191 runs through Upper Nazareth Township. Schoeneck, an Upper Nazareth Township village, is located in the township north of Nazareth and Nazareth Borough Park.

== Geography ==
According to the U.S. Census Bureau, the township has a total area of 7.4 square miles (19.3 km^{2}), 7.3 square miles (18.9 km^{2}) of which is land and 0.1 square miles (0.4 km^{2}) (1.89%) of which is water. It is in the Delaware River watershed and is drained by two Lehigh River tributaries, Monocacy Creek and Bushkill Creek. Its five villages are Christian Springs, Eastlawn Gardens, Georgetown, Penn Allen, and Schoeneck.

=== Neighboring municipalities ===
- Nazareth (south)
- Lower Nazareth Township (south)
- East Allen Township (west)
- Bath (west)
- Moore Township (northwest)
- Bushkill Township (north)
- Plainfield Township (northeast)
- Stockertown (east)
- Palmer Township (southeast)

== Transportation ==
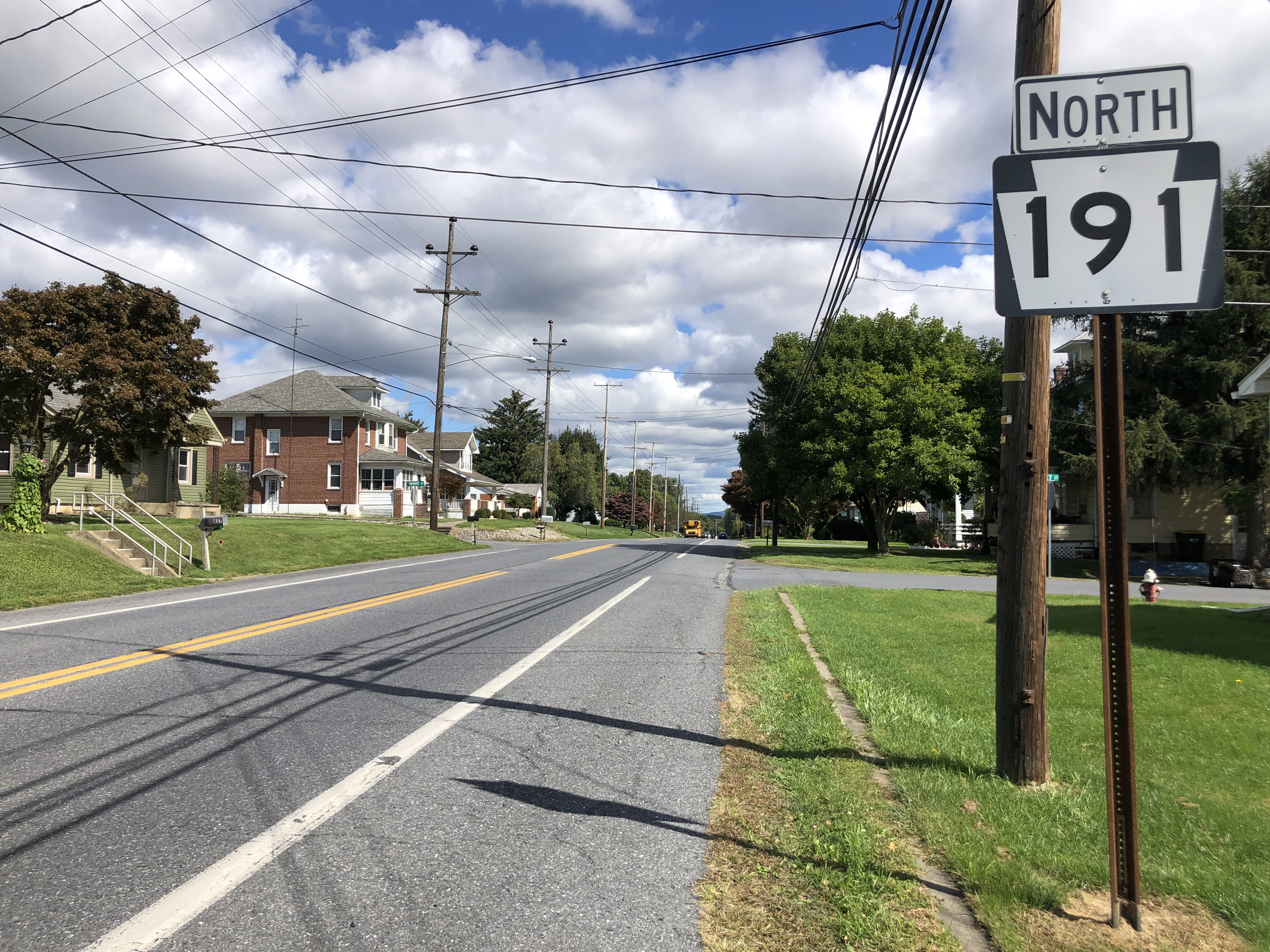
PA Route 191 North in Upper Nazareth Township

As of 2017, there were 43.18 miles (69.49 km) of public roads in Upper Nazareth Township, of which 11.47 miles (18.46 km) were maintained by the Pennsylvania Department of Transportation (PennDOT) and 31.71 miles (51.03 km) were maintained by the township.

Numbered highways serving Upper Nazareth Township include Pennsylvania Route 191, Pennsylvania Route 248 and Pennsylvania Route 946. PA 191 follows a southwest–northeast alignment through the northeastern portion of the township. PA 248 follows an east–west alignment through the southwestern portion of the township. PA 946 follows a north–south alignment through the southwestern portion of the township.

== Demographics ==
Historical population
| Census | Pop. | Note | %± |
|---|---|---|---|
| 2000 | 4,426 | | — |
| 2010 | 6,231 | | 40.8% |
| 2020 | 8,127 | | 30.4% |
U.S. Decennial Census

As of 2000 census, there were 4,426 people, 1,327 households, and 1,044 families residing in the township. The population density was 603.9 inhabitants per square mile (233.2/km^{2}). There were 1,364 housing units at an average density of 186.1 per square mile (71.9/km^{2}). The racial makeup of the township was 97.99% White, 0.61% African American, 0.11% Native American, 0.41% Asian, 0.50% from other races, and 0.38% from two or more races. Hispanic or Latino people of any race were 1.47% of the population.

There were 1,327 households, out of which 38.8% had children under the age of 18 living with them, 68.0% were married couples living together, 8.4% had a female householder with no husband present, and 21.3% were non-families. 16.8% of all households were made up of individuals, and 9.1% had someone living alone who was 65 years of age or older. The average household size was 2.73 and the average family size was 3.10.

In the township, the population was spread out, with 21.8% under the age of 18, 4.2% from 18 to 24, 25.8% from 25 to 44, 18.8% from 45 to 64, and 29.3% who were 65 years of age or older. The median age was 44 years. For every 100 females, there were 81.1 males. For every 100 females age 18 and over, there were 74.9 males. The median income for a household in the township was $55,291, and the median income for a family was $61,298. Males had a median income of $42,102 versus $26,161 for females. The per capita income for the township was $21,300. About 0.7% of families and 1.7% of the population were below the poverty line, including 2.6% of those under age 18 and none of those age 65 or over.

== Education ==
Upper Nazareth Township is served by the Nazareth Area School District. Students in grades nine through 12 attend the district's Nazareth Area High School. Students in grades seven through eight attend Nazareth Area Middle School.
