= Saylorsburg, Pennsylvania =

Unincorporated community in Pennsylvania, US

- Census-designated place
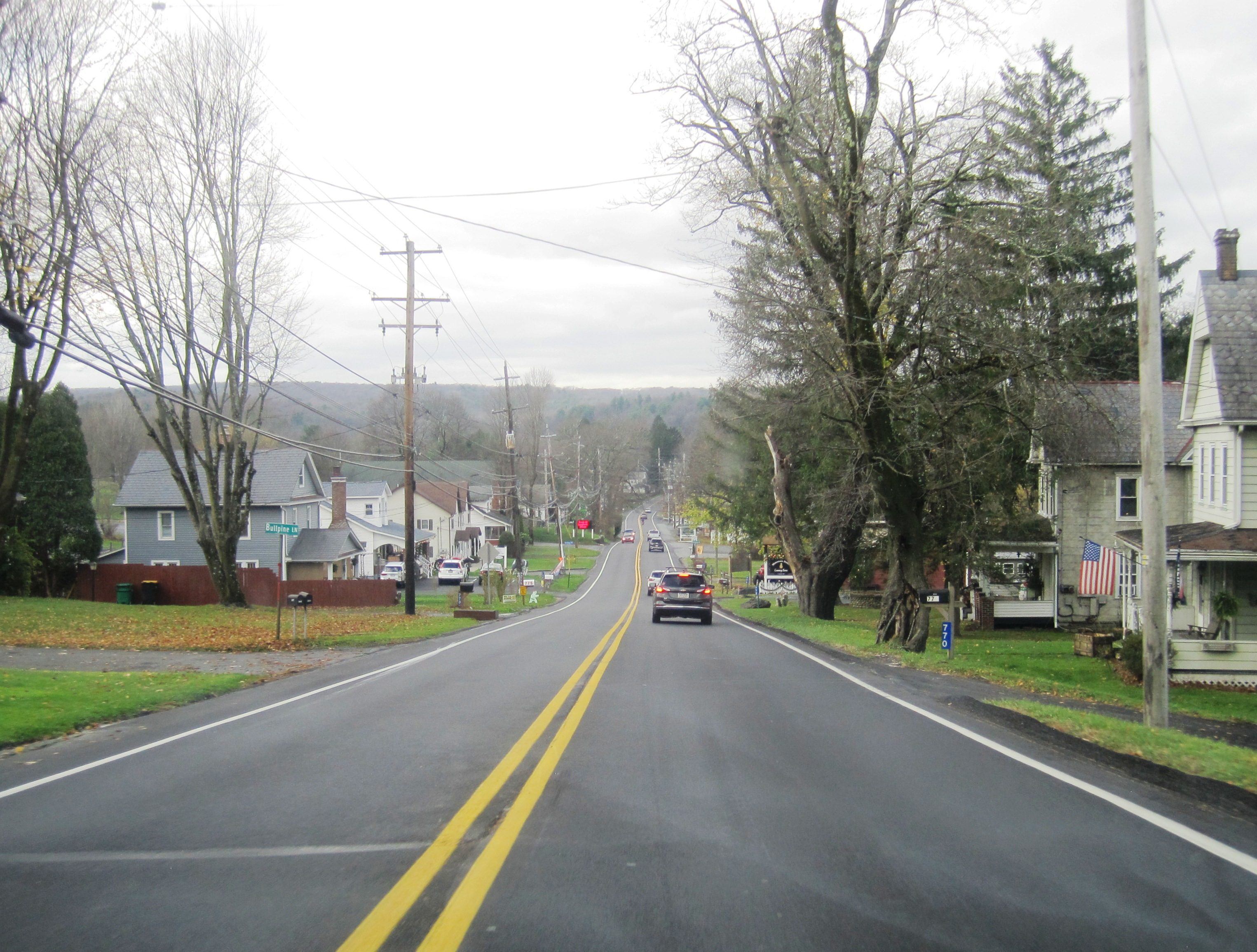
- Saylorsburg along Wilkes Barre Turnpike

- Location within Pennsylvania Location within the United States
- Coordinates: 40°53′44″N 75°19′25″W
- Country: United States
- State: Pennsylvania
- County: Monroe
- Townships: Hamilton, Ross

Area
  - Total: 1.26 sq mi (3.3 km^{2})
  - Land: 1.2 sq mi (3.1 km^{2})
  - Water: 0.06 sq mi (0.16 km^{2})
- Elevation: 669 ft (204 m)

Population (2010)
  - Total: 1,126
  - Density: 938.3/sq mi (362.3/km^{2})
- Time zone: UTC-5 (Eastern (EST))
  - Summer (DST): UTC-4 (EDT)
- ZIP code: 18353
- Area codes: 570 and 272
- GNIS feature ID: 1187049

Saylorsburg is a census-designated place and unincorporated community in Monroe County, Pennsylvania, United States. Saylorsburg is located off Pennsylvania Route 33, 5 miles (8.0 km) northwest of Wind Gap. As of the 2010 census, its population was 1,126. The village is located in both Ross Township and Hamilton Township.

Saylorsburg is in the Pocono Mountains.

== Wildlife ==
Saylorsburg is home to some species of wildlife, including American black bear, gray & red fox, white-tailed deer, groundhog, Virginia opossum, raccoon, and fisher. Saylorsburg is also home to several bird species including great blue heron, wild turkey, and bald eagle. Although only few sightings have been reported, it is commonly known that elk reside in higher elevations in the Pocono Mountains.

== Education ==
The Hamilton Township side of the CDP is in Stroudsburg Area School District while the Ross Township side is in Pleasant Valley School District.

== Notable people ==
- Jeff Bittiger, Major League Baseball player
- Fethullah Gülen, founder of the Gülen movement
