= Monocacy Creek (Lehigh River tributary) =

Coordinates: 40.66068°N 75.38138°W

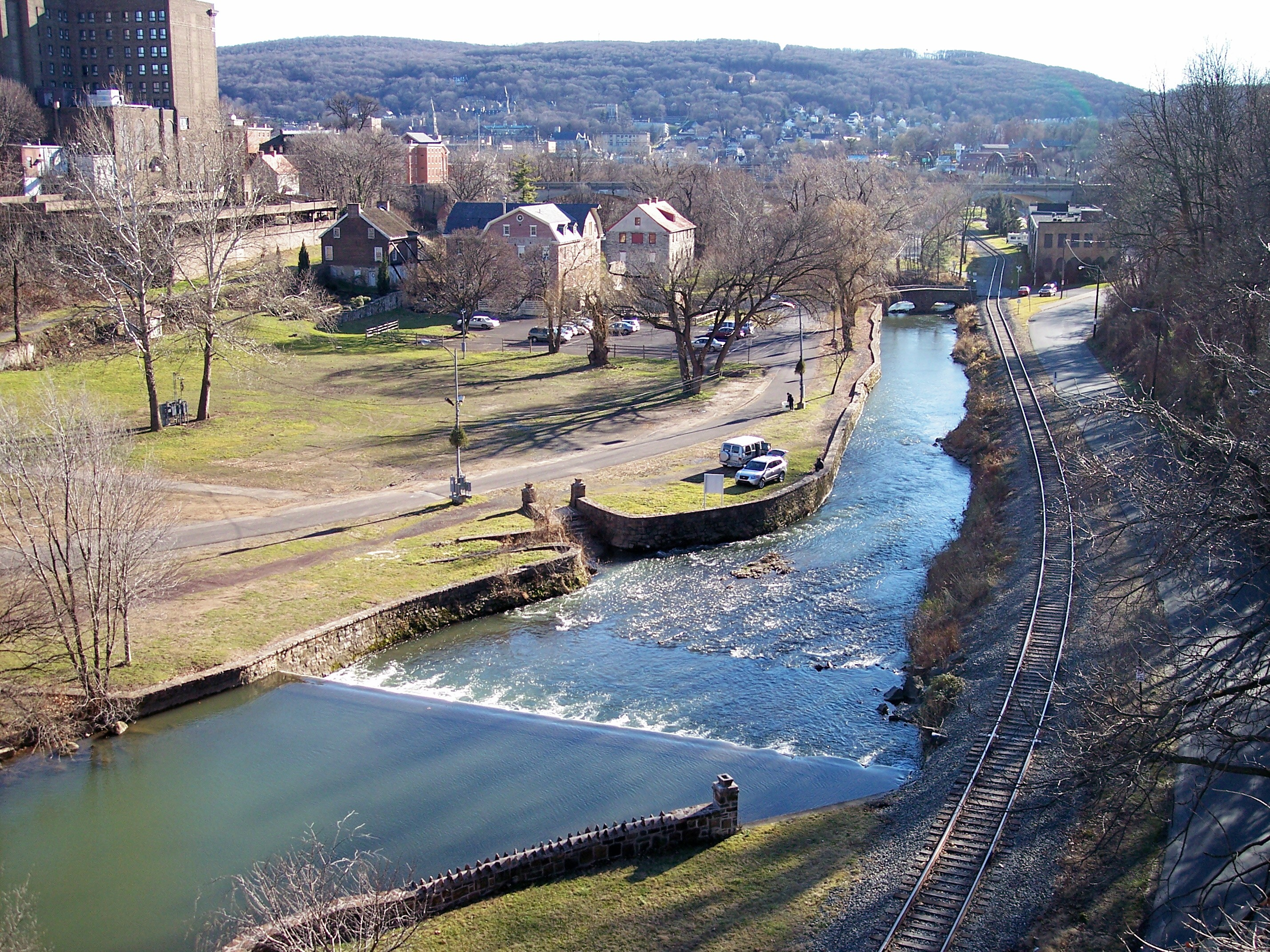
Monocacy Creek near downtown Bethlehem in January 2007

Monocacy Creek (pronounced muh-naw-cuh-see) is a tributary of the Lehigh River in Northampton County, Pennsylvania.

== History and notable features ==
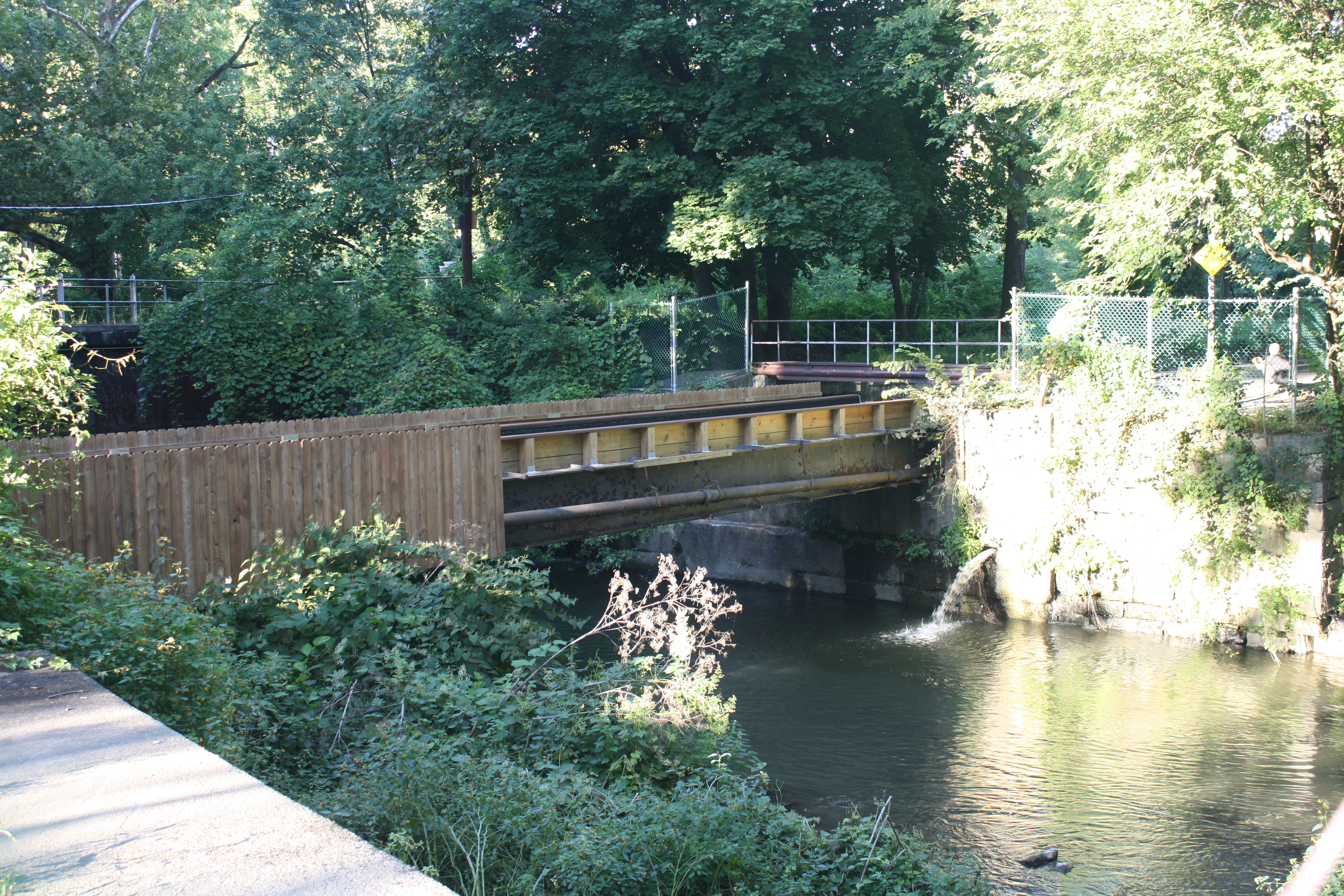
Lehigh Canal aqueduct over Monocacy Creek in Bethlehem in September 2013

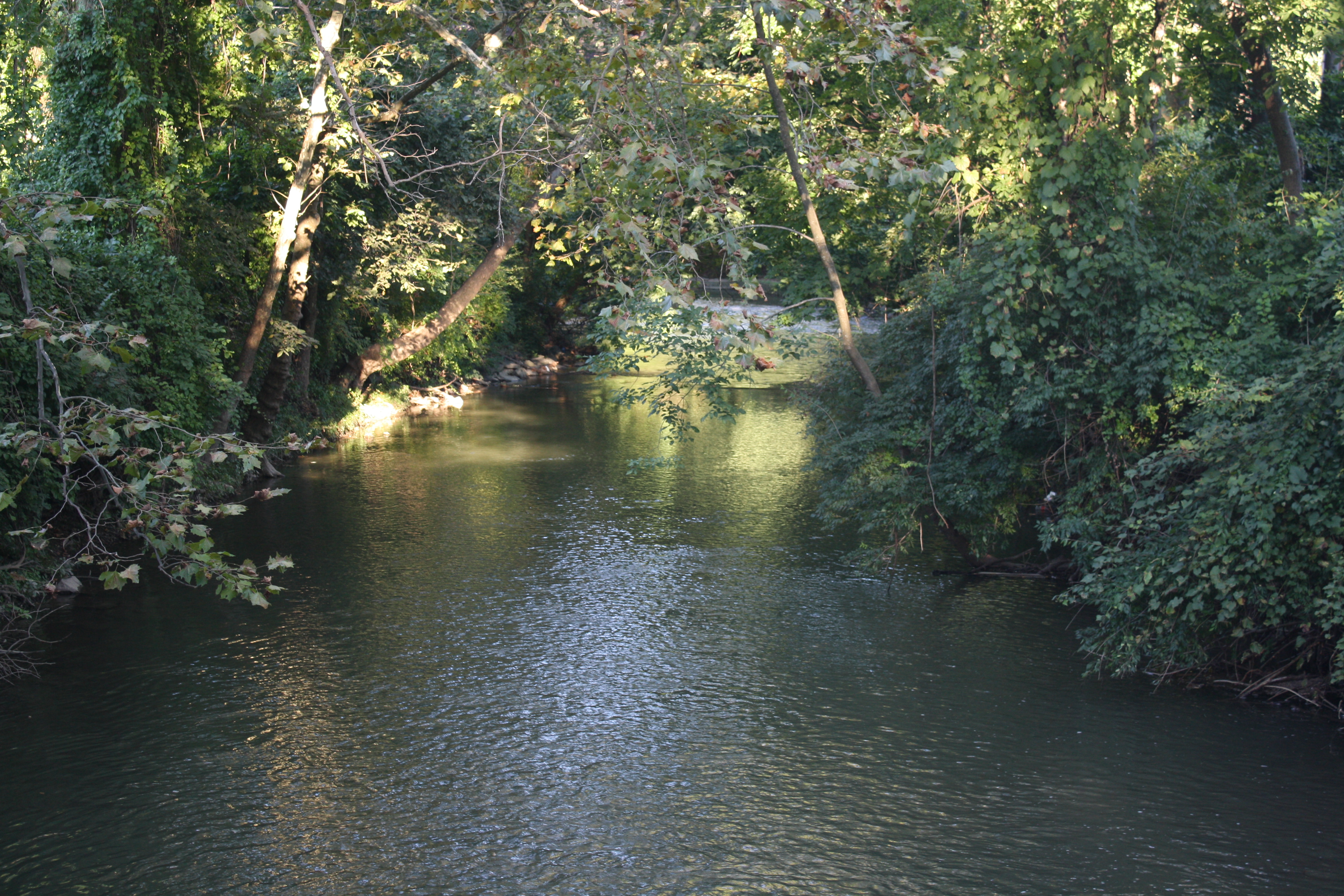
Monocacy Creek near its confluence with the Lehigh River in September 2013

The creek's name is a corruption of the Native American menagassi, which means "stream with several large bends." Its spelling has had many variants. In the early 18th century, the creek was referred to as Manakisy and Manakesis. Later spellings included Manakes, Manoquesay, Manockisy, and Manokissy. As late as 1883, it was known as the Manokesy River, but by the twentieth century the spelling became standardized as Monocacy.

One of only fifty-six limestone streams in Pennsylvania, this creek's headwaters lie in the Slate Belt, near the borough of Chapman. From Chapman, the Monocacy follows a 20.3-mile (32.7 km) course through the limestone Lehigh Valley.

In all, the creek drains an area of about 49.6 square miles, flowing through six townships, Bushkill, Moore, East Allen, Upper Nazareth, Lower Nazareth, and Hanover before reaching its confluence with the Lehigh River in Bethlehem.

Monocacy Creek Watershed Association protects the creek and its tributaries by sponsoring creek cleanups and other conservation events.

== See also ==
- List of rivers of Pennsylvania
