= Hollo, Pennsylvania =

Unincorporated community in Pennsylvania, US

Hollo
- Unincorporated community
- Location of Hollo in Pennsylvania Hollo (the United States)
- Coordinates: 40°43′22″N 75°17′44″W
- Country: United States
- State: Pennsylvania
- County: Northampton
- Township: Lower Macungie; Lower Nazareth Township

Population (2000)
  - Metro: 865,310 (US: 68th)
- Time zone: UTC-5 (Eastern (EST))
  - Summer (DST): UTC-4 (EDT)
- ZIP Codes: 18045, 18064
- Area code: 610
- GNIS feature ID: 1203827

Hollo (also Hallo, Niesky, or Nisky) is an unincorporated community in Northampton County, Pennsylvania, United States. It is part of the Lehigh Valley metropolitan area, which had a population of 861,899 and was the 68th-most populous metropolitan area in the U.S. as of the 2020 census.
