= Ross Common Manor =

Historic house in Pennsylvania, United States

- U.S. National Register of Historic Places
- U.S. Historic district
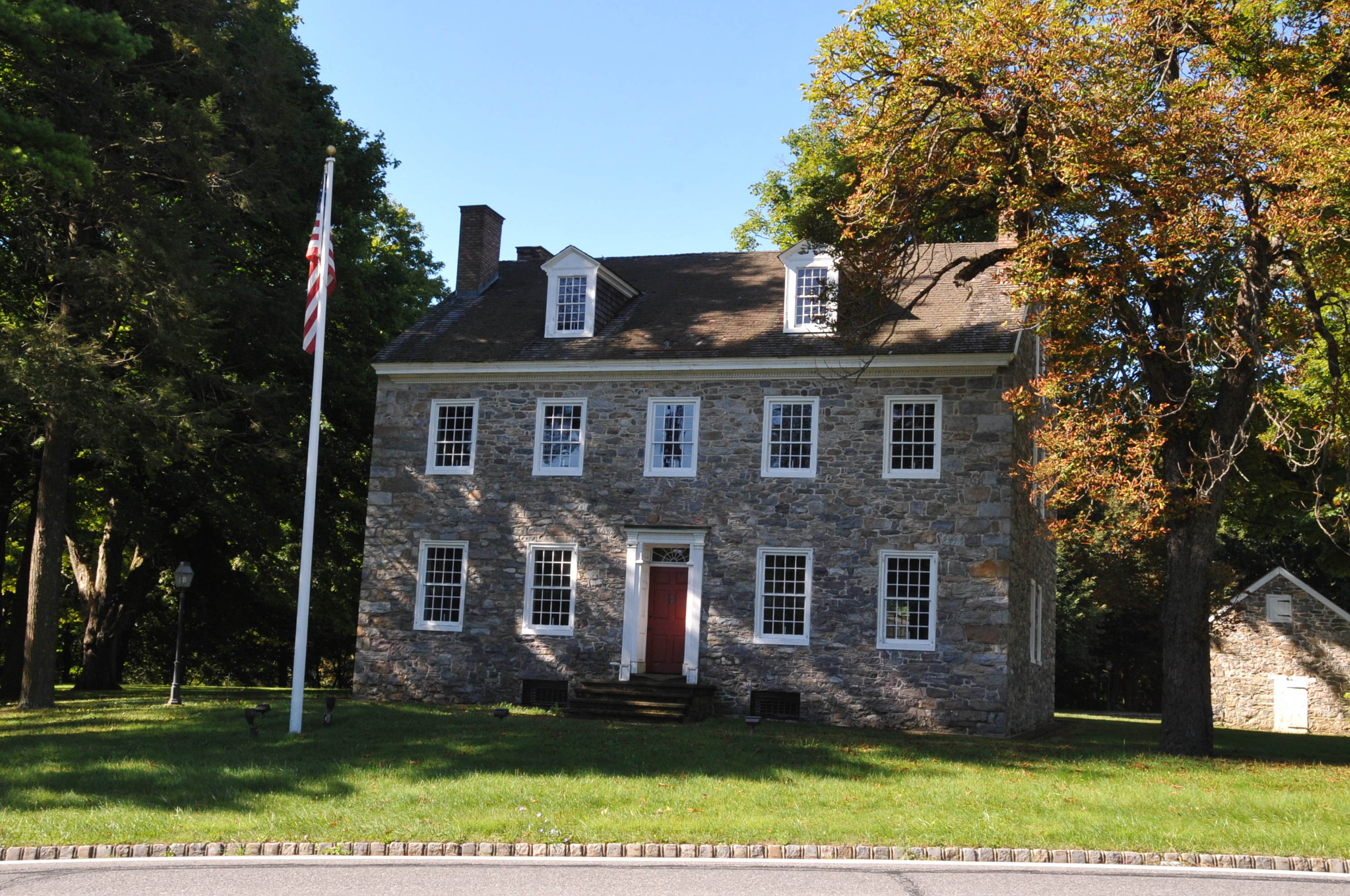

- Location within Pennsylvania Location within the United States
- Interactive map showing the location of Ross Common Manor
- Location: South of Saylorsburg on Pennsylvania Route 115 in Ross Township, Pennsylvania
- Coordinates: 40°51′54″N 75°18′23″W
- Area: 3 acres (1.2 ha)
- Built: c. 1810
- Built by: Ross, John
- NRHP reference No.: 78002432
- Added to NRHP: November 22, 1978

Ross Common Manor is a national historic district that is located in Ross Township, Monroe County, Pennsylvania.

It was added to the National Register of Historic Places in 1978.

== History and architectural features ==
This district encompasses four contributing buildings and one contributing site that are located on the historic estate of Ross Common Manor. The manor house was built circa 1810, and is a 2 1/2-story, five-bay-wide, stone dwelling with a gable roof. The 1809 stone kitchen building was attached to the main house around 1890, and was built by John Ross (1770–1834), who served as a U.S. Congressman.

Also located on the property are a stone ice house (1810), a 3 1/2-story frame grist mill, a former barn (1880) that was converted to a theater in the 1930s, and the Ross family cemetery with burials dating from 1814 to the 1850s.

During the mid-19th century, the manor house was used as an inn and tavern.
