= Ross Township, Monroe County, Pennsylvania =

Township in Pennsylvania, US

Ross Township
- Township
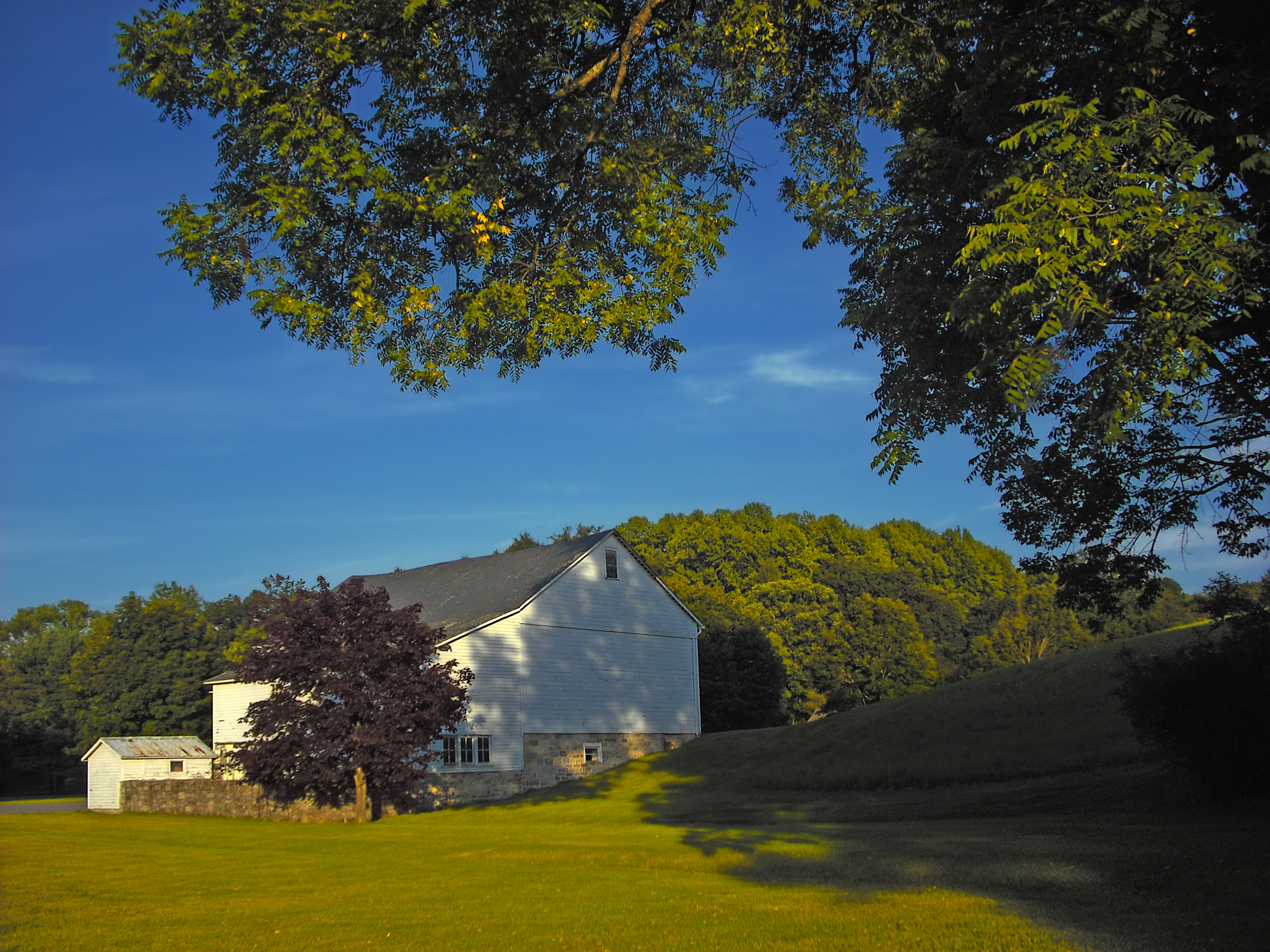
- A farm in Ross Township

- Map of Ross Township in Monroe County, Pennsylvania (left) and of Monroe County in Pennsylvania (right)

- Pennsylvania
- Coordinates: 40°51′00″N 75°22′59″W
- Country: United States
- State: Pennsylvania
- County: Monroe

Area
  - Total: 22.93 sq mi (59.39 km^{2})
  - Land: 22.90 sq mi (59.30 km^{2})
  - Water: 0.035 sq mi (0.09 km^{2})
- Elevation: 771 ft (235 m)

Population (2020)
  - Total: 5,464 ▼
  - Estimate (2021): 5,510
  - Density: 250.9/sq mi (96.89/km^{2})
- Time zone: UTC-5 (EST)
  - Summer (DST): UTC-4 (EDT)
- Area code: 570
- FIPS code: 42-089-66280
- Website: https://rosstwpmcpa.gov/

Ross Township is a township in Monroe County, Pennsylvania, United States. The population was 5,464 at the 2020 census. Ross Township is one of 16 townships in Monroe County.

== History ==
Ross Common Manor was listed on the National Register of Historic Places in 1978.

=== 2013 shooting ===
On August 5, 2013, three people were killed, and at least three were in critical condition in a shooting at a township supervisors' monthly meeting after 7:30 p.m. EDT at the Ross Township building. The gunman, 59-year-old Rockne Newell, was tackled by West End Open Space Commission executive director, Bernie Kozen, and Newell was shot with his own gun. He was taken to the hospital and released into police custody. Newell approached the building armed with a long gun and opened fire through the windows. Up to 18 people were inside at the time.

Newell had an ongoing dispute with the Ross Township board of supervisors and they repeatedly told him to clean his land.

== Geography ==
According to the U.S. Census Bureau, the township has a total area of 22.7 square miles (58.7 km^{2}), 22.6 square miles (58.6 km^{2}) of which is land and 0.04 square mile (0.1 km^{2}) (0.18%) of which is water. It is drained by the Aquashicola Creek westward into the Lehigh River. Blue Mountain forms its natural southern boundary. Its three villages are Ross Common, Rossland, and Saylorsburg.

=== Neighboring municipalities ===
- Eldred Township (west)
- Polk Township (tangent to the northwest)
- Chestnuthill Township (north)
- Hamilton Township (east)
- Plainfield Township, Northampton County (southeast)
- Bushkill Township, Northampton County (south)
- Moore Township, Northampton County (southwest)

== Demographics ==
Historical population
Census	Pop.	Note	%±
2000	5,435		—
2010	5,940		9.3%
2020	5,464		−8.0%
2021 (est.)	5,510		0.8%
U.S. Decennial Census

As of the census of 2000, there were 5,435 people, 1,875 households, and 1,518 families residing in the township. The population density was 240.3 inhabitants per square mile (92.8/km^{2}). There were 1,974 housing units at an average density of 87.3 per square mile (33.7/km^{2}). The racial makeup of the township was 96.61% White, 1.09% African American, 0.07% Native American, 0.39% Asian, 0.77% from other races, and 1.07% from two or more races. Hispanic or Latino of any race were 2.19% of the population.

There were 1,875 households, out of which 40.1% had children under the age of 18 living with them, 69.9% were married couples living together, 6.9% had a female householder with no husband present, and 19.0% were non-families. 13.0% of all households were made up of individuals, and 3.9% had someone living alone who was 65 years of age or older. The average household size was 2.87 and the average family size was 3.16.

In the township the population was spread out, with 28.6% under the age of 18, 5.7% from 18 to 24, 31.0% from 25 to 44, 25.0% from 45 to 64, and 9.7% who were 65 years of age or older. The median age was 38 years. For every 100 females, there were 102.7 males. For every 100 females age 18 and over, there were 100.8 males.

The median income for a household in the township was $48,750, and the median income for a family was $52,639. Males had a median income of $40,716 versus $28,750 for females. The per capita income for the township was $20,002. About 5.0% of families and 7.2% of the population were below the poverty line, including 7.8% of those under age 18 and 5.8% of those age 65 or over.

United States presidential election results for Ross Township, Monroe County, Pennsylvania
Year	Republican		Democratic		Third party(ies)	
Year	No.	%	No.	%	No.	%
2024	2,099	65.72%	1,066	33.38%	29	0.91%
2020	1,744	60.62%	1,091	37.92%	42	1.46%
2016	1,599	63.88%	809	32.32%	95	3.80%
2012	1,237	54.02%	1,015	44.32%	38	1.66%
2008	1,199	49.20%	1,209	49.61%	29	1.19%
2004	1,201	55.35%	957	44.10%	12	0.55%
2000	877	51.83%	753	44.50%	62	3.66%

== Climate ==
According to the Trewartha climate classification system, Ross Township has a Temperate Continental climate (Dc) with warm summers (b), cold winters (o) and year-around precipitation (Dcbo). Dcbo climates are characterized by at least one month having an average mean temperature ≤ 32.0 °F (0.0 °C), four to seven months with an average mean temperature ≥ 50.0 °F (10.0 °C), all months with an average mean temperature < 72.0 °F (22.2 °C) and no significant precipitation difference between seasons. Although most summer days are slightly humid in Ross Township, episodes of heat and high humidity can occur with heat index values > 101 °F (38 °C). Since 1981, the highest air temperature was 99.1 °F (37.3 °C) on 07/22/2011, and the highest daily average mean dew point was 72.2 °F (22.3 °C) on 08/01/2006. July is the peak month for thunderstorm activity which correlates with the average warmest month of the year. The average wettest month is September which correlates with tropical storm remnants during the peak of the Atlantic hurricane season. Since 1981, the wettest calendar day was 5.98 inches (152 mm) on 09/30/2010. During the winter months, the plant hardiness zone is 6a with an average annual extreme minimum air temperature of −6.8 °F (−21.6 °C). Since 1981, the coldest air temperature was −19.5 °F (−28.6 °C) on 01/21/1994. Episodes of extreme cold and wind can occur with wind chill values < −19 °F (−28 °C). The average snowiest month is January which correlates with the average coldest month of the year. Ice storms and large snowstorms depositing ≥ 12 inches (30 cm) of snow occur once every couple of years, particularly during nor’easters from December through March.

Climate data for Ross Twp, Elevation 768 ft (234 m), 1981-2010 normals, extremes 1981-2018
Month	Jan	Feb	Mar	Apr	May	Jun	Jul	Aug	Sep	Oct	Nov	Dec	Year
Record high °F (°C)	66.6 (19.2)	75.9 (24.4)	84.4 (29.1)	91.4 (33.0)	92.6 (33.7)	92.8 (33.8)	99.1 (37.3)	96.9 (36.1)	94.3 (34.6)	86.9 (30.5)	77.3 (25.2)	69.7 (20.9)	99.1 (37.3)
Mean daily maximum °F (°C)	35.1 (1.7)	38.4 (3.6)	47.4 (8.6)	59.9 (15.5)	70.4 (21.3)	78.4 (25.8)	82.9 (28.3)	81.0 (27.2)	74.0 (23.3)	62.5 (16.9)	51.2 (10.7)	39.2 (4.0)	60.1 (15.6)
Daily mean °F (°C)	26.4 (−3.1)	28.8 (−1.8)	37.1 (2.8)	48.3 (9.1)	58.4 (14.7)	67.1 (19.5)	71.5 (21.9)	69.7 (20.9)	62.4 (16.9)	50.8 (10.4)	41.5 (5.3)	31.0 (−0.6)	49.5 (9.7)
Mean daily minimum °F (°C)	17.6 (−8.0)	19.1 (−7.2)	26.8 (−2.9)	36.5 (2.5)	46.3 (7.9)	55.7 (13.2)	60.1 (15.6)	58.5 (14.7)	50.8 (10.4)	39.2 (4.0)	31.8 (−0.1)	22.8 (−5.1)	38.9 (3.8)
Record low °F (°C)	−19.5 (−28.6)	−8.5 (−22.5)	−0.9 (−18.3)	13.9 (−10.1)	29.4 (−1.4)	36.1 (2.3)	41.8 (5.4)	37.1 (2.8)	30.3 (−0.9)	18.9 (−7.3)	4.9 (−15.1)	−6.3 (−21.3)	−19.5 (−28.6)
Average precipitation inches (mm)	3.48 (88)	2.96 (75)	3.77 (96)	4.16 (106)	4.36 (111)	4.79 (122)	4.62 (117)	4.20 (107)	4.93 (125)	4.60 (117)	3.96 (101)	4.08 (104)	49.91 (1,268)
Average snowfall inches (cm)	13.2 (34)	9.5 (24)	9.8 (25)	2.3 (5.8)	0.0 (0.0)	0.0 (0.0)	0.0 (0.0)	0.0 (0.0)	0.0 (0.0)	0.1 (0.25)	2.5 (6.4)	7.9 (20)	45.4 (115)
Average relative humidity (%)	70.8	66.7	61.5	58.9	62.9	70.5	70.0	73.4	74.0	71.7	70.7	72.5	68.6
Average dew point °F (°C)	18.2 (−7.7)	19.1 (−7.2)	25.1 (−3.8)	34.6 (1.4)	45.8 (7.7)	57.2 (14.0)	61.2 (16.2)	60.8 (16.0)	54.0 (12.2)	42.0 (5.6)	32.7 (0.4)	23.2 (−4.9)	39.6 (4.2)
Source: PRISM

== Transportation ==
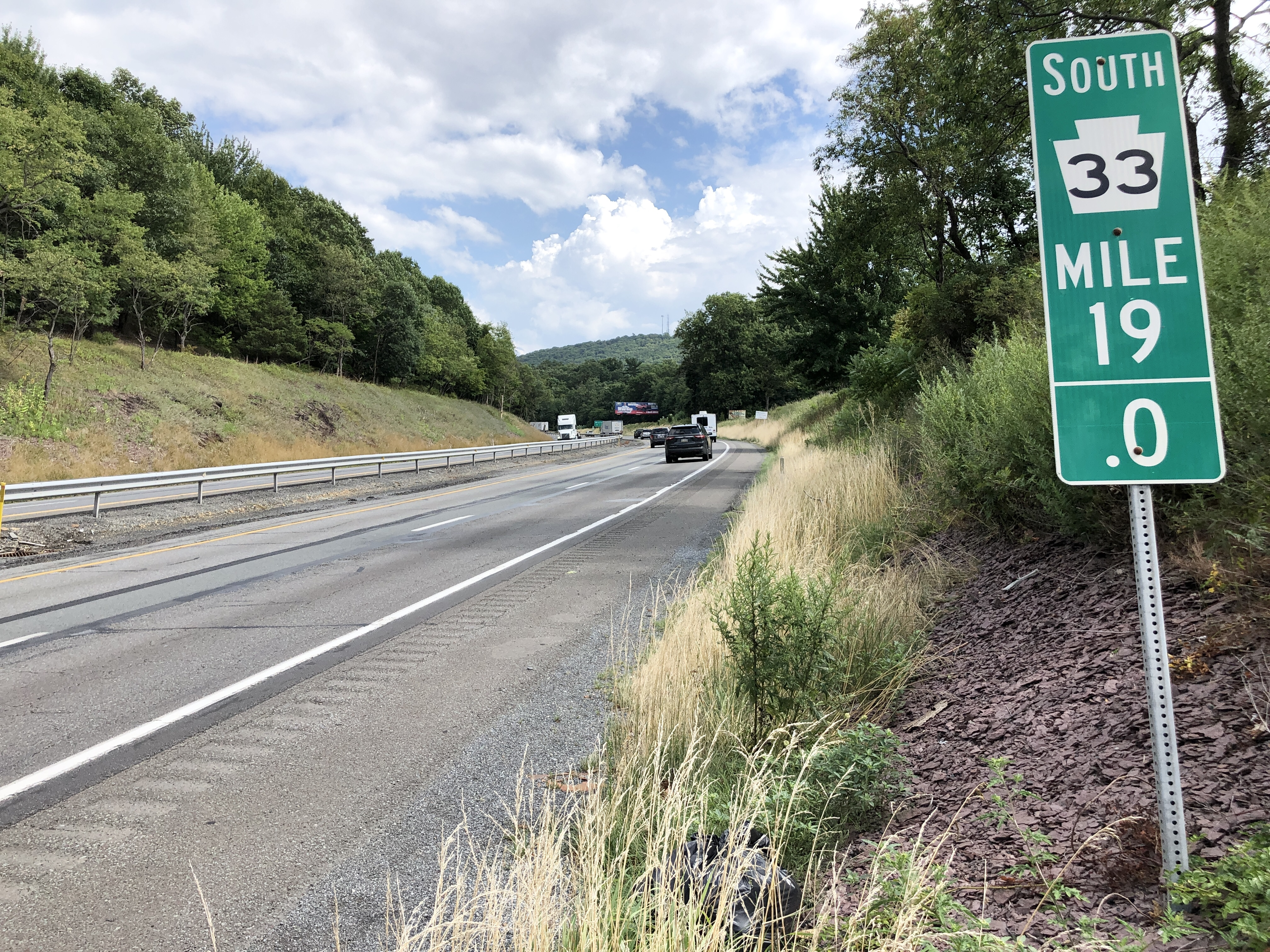
PA 33 southbound in Ross Township

As of 2013, there were 68.07 miles (109.55 km) of public roads in Ross Township, of which 19.91 miles (32.04 km) were maintained by the Pennsylvania Department of Transportation (PennDOT) and 48.16 miles (77.51 km) were maintained by the township.

Pennsylvania Route 33 is the only numbered highway serving Ross Township. It briefly crosses the eastern corner of the township, but the nearest interchanges are in neighboring townships. Main thoroughfares within the township include Kunkletown Road, Mount Eaton Road, Old Route 115, Upper Smith Gap Road, and Weir Lake Road.

== Ecology ==
According to the A. W. Kuchler's U.S. potential natural vegetation types, Ross Township has a dominant vegetation type of Appalachian Oak (104) with a dominant vegetation form of Eastern Hardwood Forest (25). The peak spring bloom typically occurs in late-April and peak fall color usually occurs in mid-October. The plant hardiness zone is 6a with an average annual extreme minimum air temperature of −6.8 °F (−21.6 °C).
