= Katellen, Pennsylvania =

Unincorporated community in Pennsylvania, U.S.

Coordinates: 40°49′29″N 75°22′03″W

Katellen is an unincorporated community in Northampton County, Pennsylvania. It is part of the Lehigh Valley metropolitan area, which had a population of 861,899 and was the 68th-most populous metropolitan area in the U.S. as of the 2020 census.

== History ==
Katellen was named for Kate Ellen Brodhead.
