= Belfast, Pennsylvania =

Unincorporated community in Pennsylvania, US

Belfast
- Census-designated place
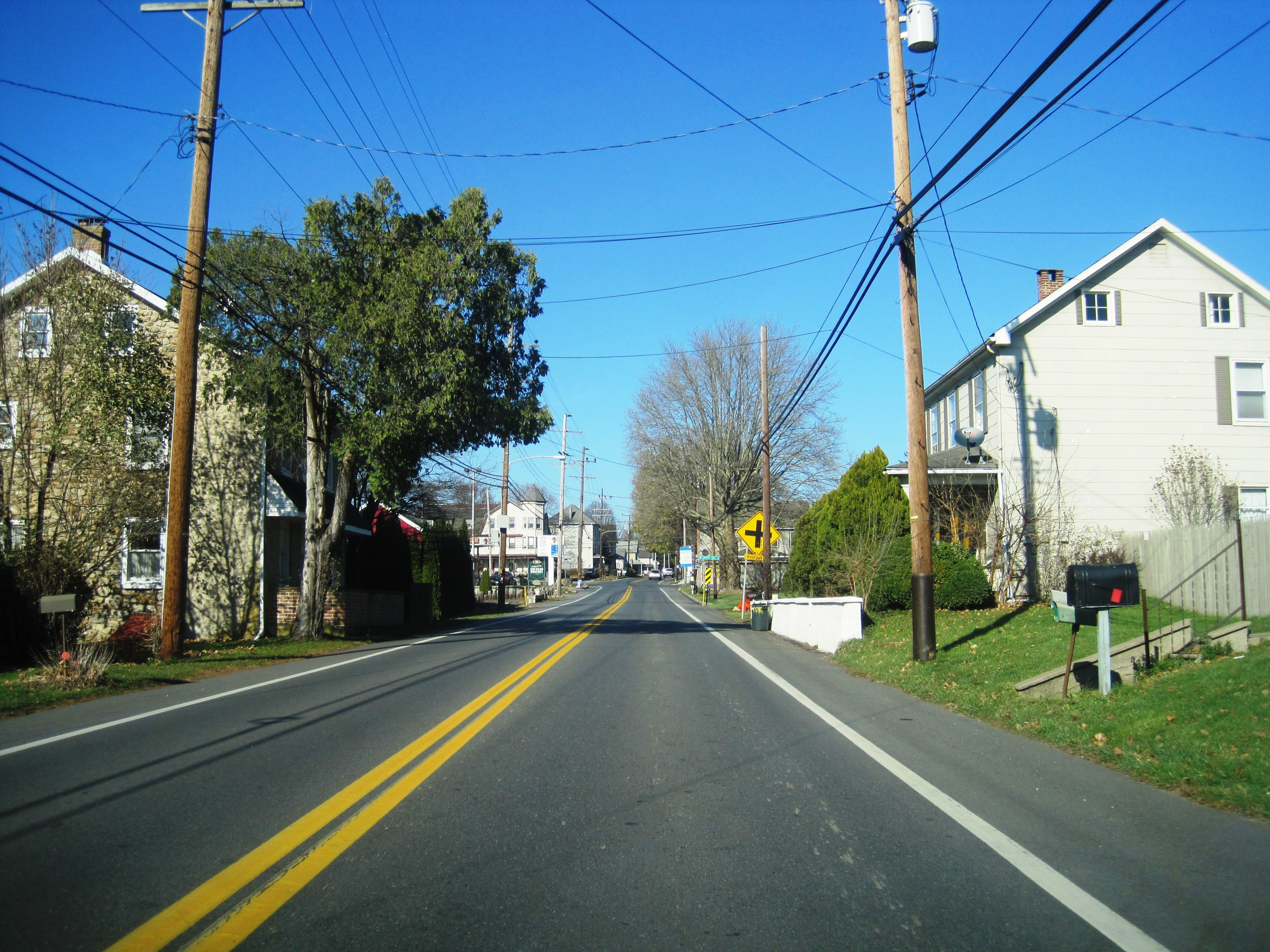
- Sullivan Trail in Belfast in November 2022

- Location of Belfast in Pennsylvania Belfast (the United States)
- Coordinates: 40°47′0″N 75°16′35″W
- Country: United States
- State: Pennsylvania
- County: Northampton

Area
  - Census-designated place: 1.1 sq mi (2.8 km^{2})
  - Land: 1.1 sq mi (2.8 km^{2})
  - Water: 0.0 sq mi (0 km^{2})
- Elevation: 525 ft (160 m)

Population (2010)
  - Census-designated place: 1,257
  - Density: 1,100/sq mi (440/km^{2})
  - Metro: 865,310 (US: 68th)
- Time zone: UTC-5 (EST)
  - Summer (DST): UTC-4 (EDT)
- ZIP Code: 18064
- Area code: 610

Belfast is a census-designated place (CDP) in Plainfield Township in Northampton County, Pennsylvania, United States. It is part of the Lehigh Valley metropolitan area, which had a population of 861,899 and was the 68th-most populous metropolitan area in the U.S. as of the 2020 census. As of the 2020 census, Belfast had a population of 1,279.

Located in one of the first settled areas in the township, the village is believed to have been named for the city of Belfast in Ireland. Its settlers, who were predominantly German and Welsh, arrived in the area in the late 18th century. The village was originally known as Belleville or Bellville because of its scenic view. The name Belfast came into use sometime after the Civil War.

== Geography ==
According to the U.S. Census Bureau, Belfast has a total area of 1.1 square miles (2.8 km^{2}), all land.

== Demographics ==
As of the 2000 census, there were 1,301 people, 505 households, and 382 families residing in the CDP. The population density was 1,181.0 inhabitants per square mile (456.0/km^{2}). There were 517 housing units at an average density of 469.3 per square mile (181.2/km^{2}). The racial makeup of the CDP was 98.00% White, 0.46% African American, 0.08% Native American, 0.54% Asian, 0.31% from other races, and 0.61% from two or more races. Hispanic or Latino of any race were 0.92% of the population.

There were 505 households, out of which 29.3% had children under the age of 18 living with them, 65.9% were married couples living together, 6.9% had a female householder with no husband present, and 24.2% were non-families. 18.4% of all households were made up of individuals, and 7.9% had someone living alone who was 65 years of age or older. The average household size was 2.58 and the average family size was 2.93.

In Belfast, the population was spread out, with 22.4% under the age of 18, 5.9% from 18 to 24, 27.5% from 25 to 44, 28.3% from 45 to 64, and 15.9% who were 65 years of age or older. The median age was 42 years. For every 100 females, there were 93.9 males. For every 100 females age 18 and over, there were 92.7 males. The median income for a household in the CDP was $43,784, and the median income for a family was $56,894. Males had a median income of $37,000 versus $23,362 for females. The per capita income for the CDP was $19,155. About 3.4% of families and 6.6% of the population were below the poverty line, including 6.8% of those under age 18 and 9.6% of those age 65 or over.

== Education ==
The community is served by the Pen Argyl Area School District. Students in grades nine through 12 attend Pen Argyl Area High School in Pen Argyl.
