= Bushkill Creek =

Tributary of the Delaware River in eastern Pennsylvania

Bushkill Creek (Dutch for "bushy" or "forest creek") is a 22.1-mile-long (35.6 km) tributary of the Delaware River in the Lehigh Valley region of eastern Pennsylvania.

A portion of Bushkill Creek passes through the Jacobsburg Environmental Education Center. The confluence with the Delaware River is in Easton.

The stream was historically named Lafever Creek, Lefebres Creek, Lefevres Creek, Lefrever Creek, Leheihan Creek, Lehieton Creek, Tatamys Creek, Tatemy's Creek, or Tattamys Creek.

== See also ==
- List of Pennsylvania rivers
- List of Delaware River tributaries
