= Goodacre =

Goodacre is a surname. Notable people with the surname include:

- Bill Goodacre (1951–2019), Canadian politician from British Columbia
- Chelsea Goodacre (born 1993), American softball player
- Geoff Goodacre (1927–2004), Australian hurdler
- Glenna Goodacre (1939–2020), American sculptor who designed the obverse of the U.S. Sacagawea dollar
- Hugh Goodacre (died 1553), English Protestant clergyman, briefly Church of Ireland Archbishop of Armagh and Primate of Ireland
- Jill Goodacre (born 1965), American actress and model
- Mark Goodacre (born 1967), New Testament scholar
- Reg Goodacre (1908–1998), English footballer
- Ross Goodacre (born 1978), New Zealand football player
- Roy Goodacre, (born 1967), British microbiologist and chemist
- Sara Goodacre, British geneticist and arachnologist
- Walter Goodacre (1856–1938), British businessman and amateur astronomer
- William Goodacre (1873–1948), English cricketer

== See also ==
- Goodacre (crater), lunar impact crater
- God's Acre
