= Stockertown, Pennsylvania =

Borough in Pennsylvania, US

Borough of Stockertown
- Borough
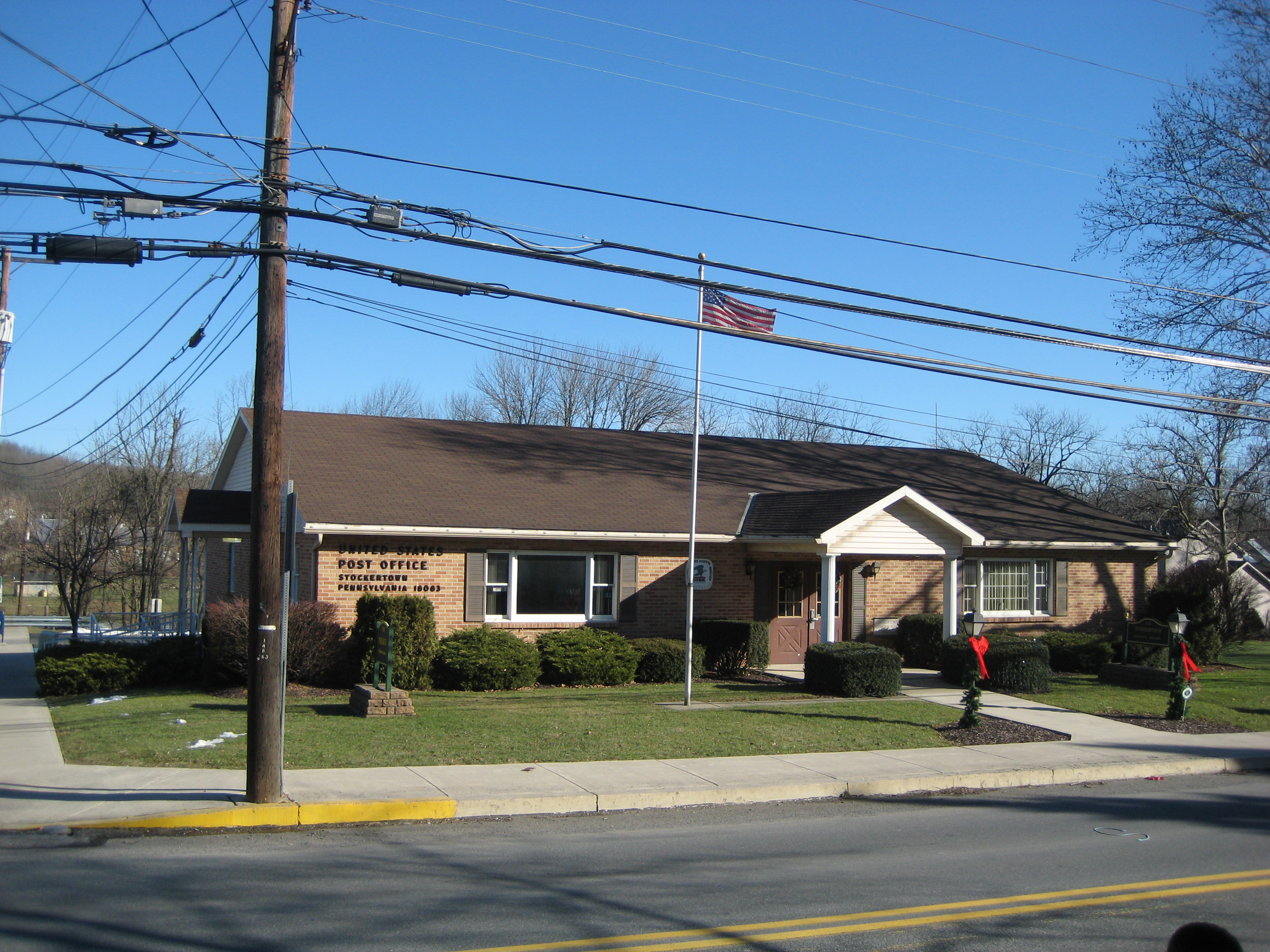
- Stockertown's post office and municipal building in December 2008

- Seal

- Location of Stockertown in Northampton County, Pennsylvania (left) and of Northampton County in Pennsylvania (right)

- Location of Stockertown in Pennsylvania Stockertown (the United States)
- Coordinates: 40°45′15″N 75°15′53″W
- Country: United States
- State: Pennsylvania
- County: Northampton
- Incorporated: 1901
- Named for: Stocker family

Government
  - Mayor: Charles Davis

Area
  - Borough: 1.00 sq mi (2.59 km^{2})
  - Land: 0.97 sq mi (2.51 km^{2})
  - Water: 0.031 sq mi (0.08 km^{2})
- Elevation: 374 ft (114 m)

Population (2010)
  - Borough: 927
  - Estimate (2019): 926
  - Density: 955.1/sq mi (368.76/km^{2})
  - Metro: 865,310 (US: 68th)
- Time zone: UTC-5 (EST)
  - Summer (DST): UTC-4 (EDT)
- ZIP Code: 18083
- Area codes: 610 and 484
- FIPS code: 42-74232
- Primary airport: Lehigh Valley International Airport
- Major hospital: Lehigh Valley Hospital–Cedar Crest
- School district: Nazareth Area
- Website: www.stockertown.org

Stockertown is a borough in Northampton County, Pennsylvania. As of the 2020 census, Stockertown had a population of 919. It is part of the Lehigh Valley metropolitan area.

The borough contains large industries such as Hercules Cement, Polymer Products, and Praxair. The borough spans a 2 1/2-mile radius and provides services for a population of 919 residents. Stockertown is at the hub of five surrounding second-class townships, and until the Charles Chrin Interchange was built near Tatamy in 2015, provided the closest access to Pennsylvania Route 33 for many industrial parks in these townships.

Since 2006, Forks Township has been contracted to provide fire services to the borough, and the borough maintains its own police department. It is located in Pennsylvania's 17th Congressional District, and in Pennsylvania's 137th (State House of Representatives) and 18th (State Senate) Legislative Districts.

== History ==
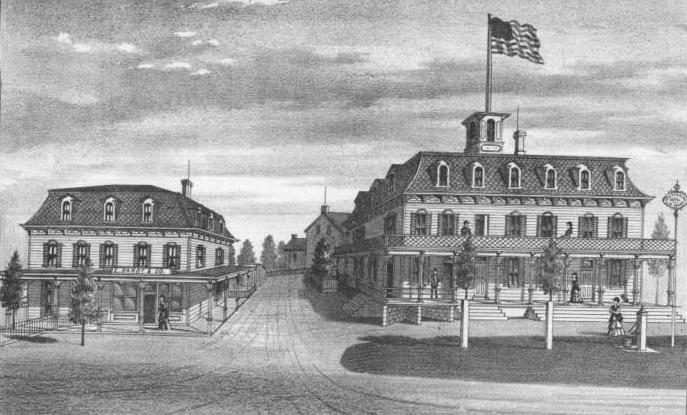
An 1877 lithograph print of the Sandt & Co. Building and the Centennial Hotel

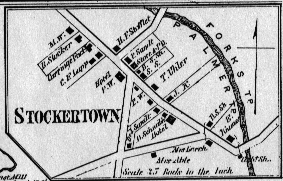
An inset from an 1874 atlas of Northampton County showing Stockertown

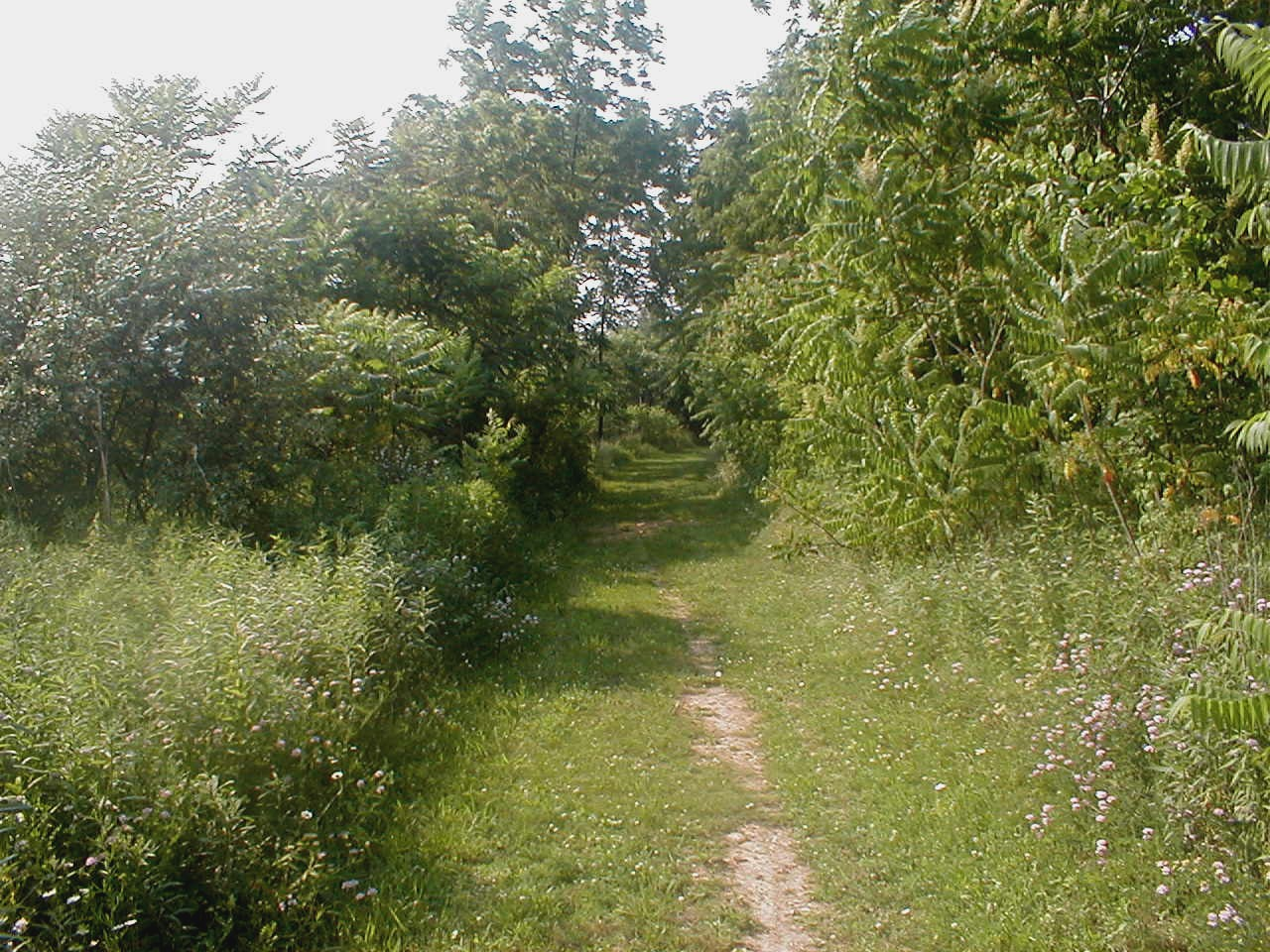
A September 2006 view of the formerly-undeveloped Stockertown Rail Trail. Its intersection with Dogwood Lane is just out of view.

Stockertown was named for the Stockers, a Swiss family who settled on the land in the late 18th century. The post village was referred to as Stockersville as of 1845, and described as a very fertile area. In late 1900, by which time the village was being called Stockertown, a group of the village's citizens petitioned Northampton County Court to grant the community the status of a borough. That petition was granted and, early in 1901, the borough government was organized.

In 1906, a cement plant, which later became Hercules Cement, was constructed as The Nazareth Works of Atlantic Portland Cement Company. It acquired the name of Hercules Cement Company in 1916 after its holdings after Atlantic Portland Cement filed for bankruptcy. It has changed owners many times through mergers, and as of 2008 is owned by Buzzi Unicem.

Liberty Hose Fire Company #1 formed in 1922, and the borough bought their first firetruck in 1925. After World War II, Liberty Hose opted to build a memorial in honor of the war's veterans. The building became the borough's Memorial Hall. In the late 1990s, Liberty Hose moved from its original building on Main Street to a new facility along State Street. This building is now the home to Stockertown's police offices and other emergency vehicles. In 2006, Liberty Hose Fire Company was disbanded.

The freeway now known as Route 33, which runs through Stockertown, began construction in 1959 from Wind Gap to Saylorsburg. Meetings were first held with residents of Stockertown in the mid 1960s, and the Stockertown portion of the highway was constructed in 1971, opening in 1972.

== Demographics ==
Historical population
Census	Pop.	Note	%±
1880	143		—
1910	426		—
1920	432		1.4%
1930	602		39.4%
1940	729		21.1%
1950	757		3.8%
1960	777		2.6%
1970	753		−3.1%
1980	661		−12.2%
1990	641		−3.0%
2000	687		7.2%
2010	927		34.9%
2020	919		−0.9%

As of the 2010 census, there were 927 people, up from 687 in 2000. The population density was 927 inhabitants per square mile (358/km^{2}). There were 293 housing units at an average density of 294.1 per square mile (113.6/km^{2}). The racial makeup of the borough was 99.56% White, 0.15% African American, 0.15% Asian, 0.15% from other races. Hispanic or Latino of any race were 0.29% of the population.

There were 279 households, out of which 28.3% had children under the age of 18 living with them, 58.1% were married couples living together, 8.2% had a female householder with no husband present, and 30.1% were non-families. 27.2% of all households were made up of individuals, and 12.2% had someone living alone who was 65 years of age or older. The average household size was 2.46 and the average family size was 2.95.

In the borough, the population was spread out, with 24.0% under the age of 18, 6.7% from 18 to 24, 29.0% from 25 to 44, 24.5% from 45 to 64, and 15.9% who were 65 years of age or older. The median age was 38 years. For every 100 females there were 87.2 males. For every 100 females age 18 and over, there were 85.8 males. The median income for a household in the borough was $48,542, and the median income for a family was $59,375. Males had a median income of $39,926 versus $26,500 for females. The per capita income for the borough was $20,984. About 5.1% of families and 6.4% of the population were below the poverty line, including 5.4% of those under age 18 and 2.0% of those age 65 or over.

== Land use ==
Land Use (as of 2006)		
Residential	161.0	(25.3%)
Commercial	37.7	(5.9%)
Industrial	102.4	(16.1%)
Transportation and Utilities	112.2	(17.7%)
Public Spaces	12.2	(2.0%)
Parks and Recreation	38.4	(6.0%)
Agriculture and Vacant	171.9	(27.0%)

== Geography ==
Stockertown is located at 40°45′15″N 75°15′53″W (40.754064, -75.264775). According to the U.S. Census Bureau, the borough has a total area of 1.0 square mile (2.6 km^{2}), of which 1.0 square mile (2.6 km^{2}) is land and 0.99% is water.

Belts of limestone lie under a part of the borough that borders Palmer Township and the nearby borough of Tatamy. This along with Hercules Cement's nearby quarrying makes these areas prone to sinkholes, (see Karst Topography) and led to the closure of a bridge that carried Bushkill Street, a state road, over the Bushkill Creek. This bridge remains closed as of 2018.

== Public education ==
Stockertown is served by the Nazareth Area School District. High school students attend Nazareth Area High School in Nazareth.

== Transportation ==
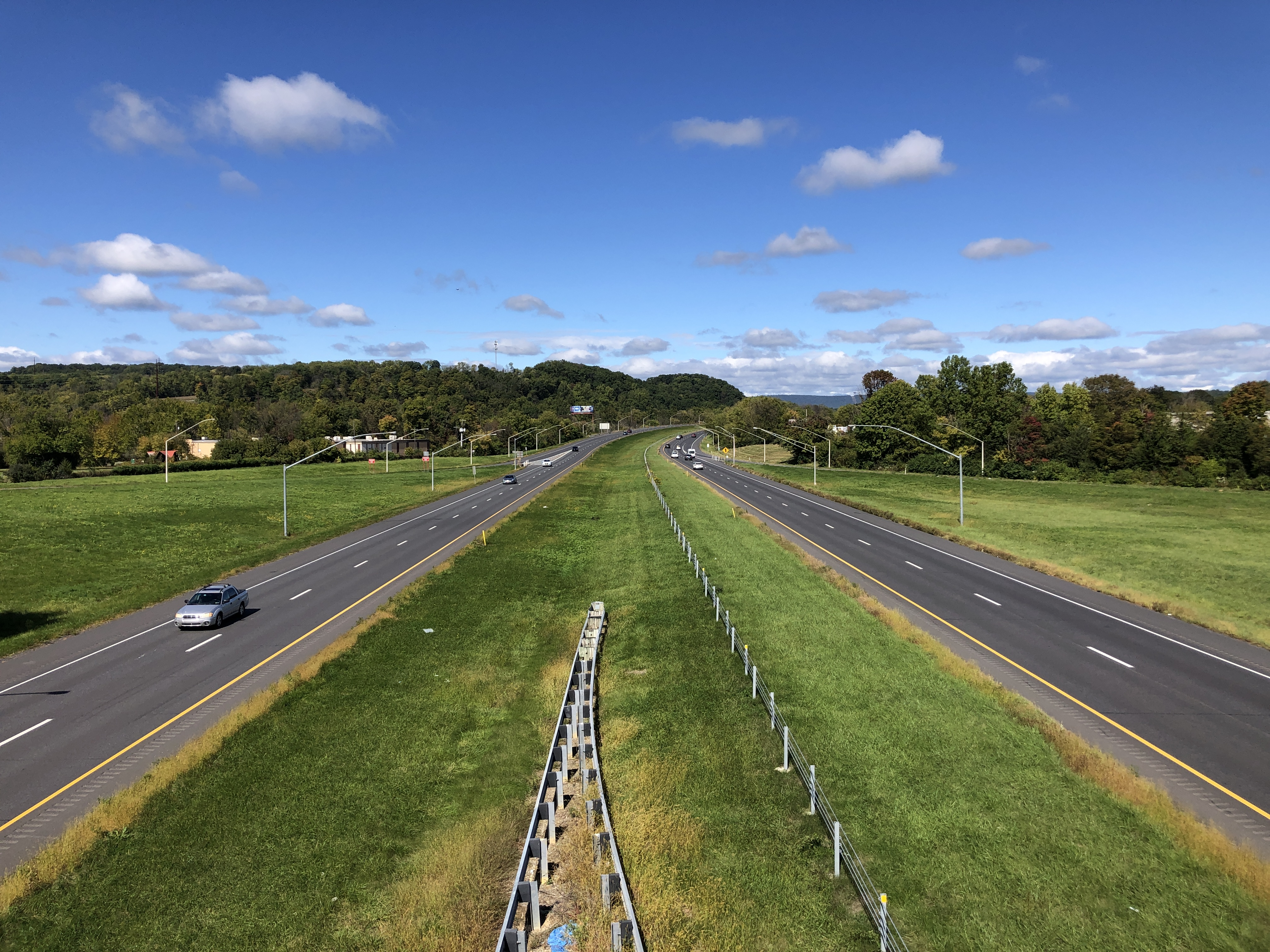
PA Route 33 northbound in Stockertown

As of 2022, there were 7.34 miles (11.81 km) of public roads in Stockertown, of which 2.95 miles (4.75 km) were maintained by the Pennsylvania Department of Transportation (PennDOT) and 4.39 miles (7.07 km) were maintained by the borough.

Pennsylvania Route 33 is the main highway serving Stockertown. It follows a northwest-southeast alignment across the southwestern portion of the borough. Pennsylvania Route 191 also traverses the borough, following a north-south route via Industrial Boulevard and Main Street.

== Rail trail ==
Stockertown is home to a packed cinder rail trail, which, once fully developed, is slated to link the Plainfield Township Trail and the Palmer Bikeway. The existing trail is about a mile long, starting at Sherman Metzgar Park, and extending to a parking area along Main Street at the North edge of the borough (Belfast Junction). A missing link of the trail, which is still in the planning stages, would be a major step towards a regional trail system by connecting Stockertown and Tatamy. Another proposed trail would extend from the Northern hub of the Stockertown Rail Trail to Jacobsburg State Park, adding connections to Bushkill Township.
