= God's Acre =

Ancient Germanic designation for a burial ground

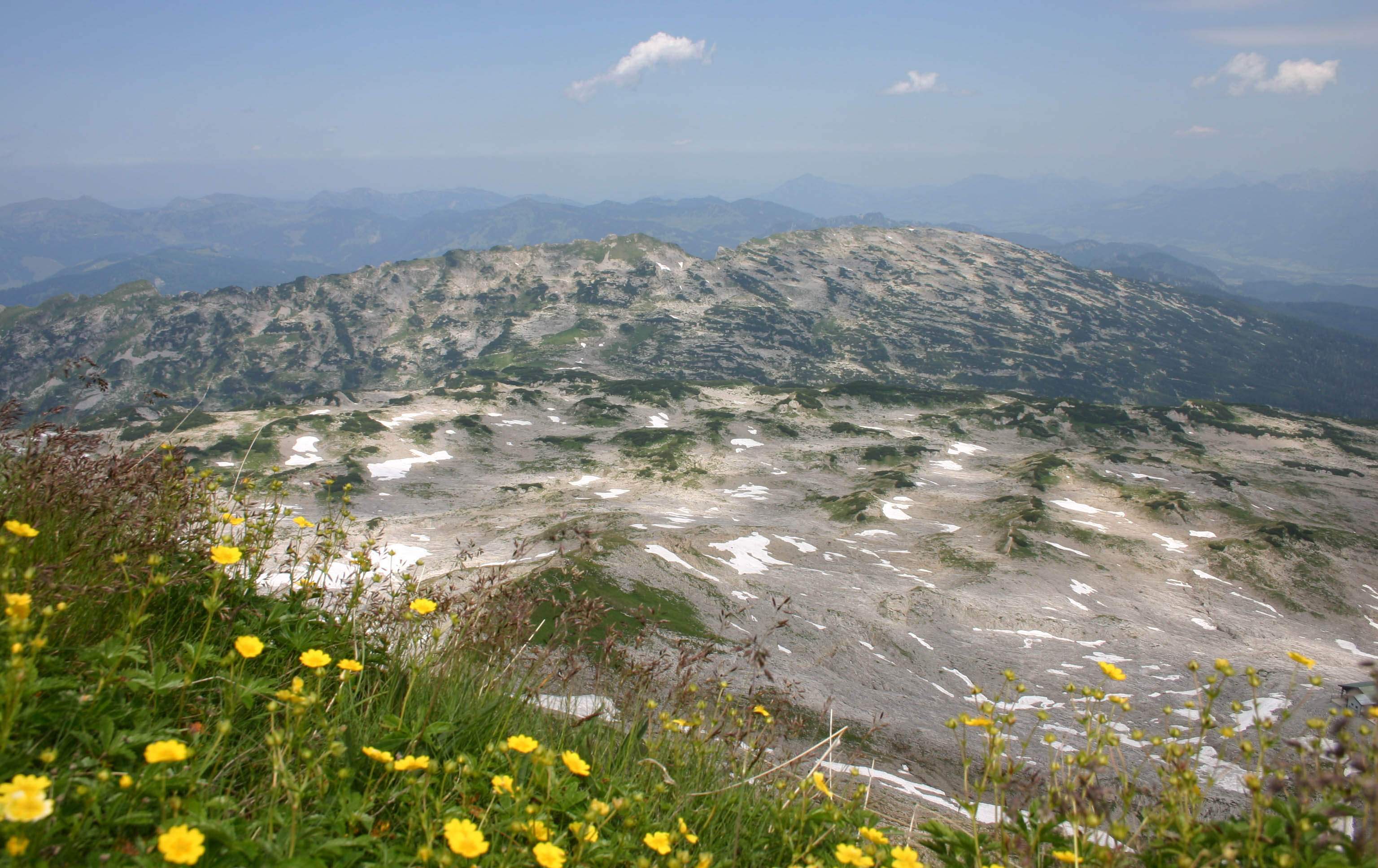
Gottesacker plateau in the Allgäu Alps

"God's Acre" refers to a churchyard, and more specifically a burial ground. The word comes from the German word Gottesacker (Field of God), an ancient designation for a burial ground. The use of "Acre" is related to, but not derived from the unit of measurement and can be of any size. In the early 17th century, the term was used as a translation of the German, but by the end of the century, it was accepted as an English term.

American Congregationalist poet Henry Wadsworth Longfellow wrote an 1842 poem called "God's Acre" which referenced this term.

While used to refer to graveyards generally in English, the term is used particularly among communicants of the Moravian Church in parts of North America, but not in the Moravian independent provinces of Alaska and Newfoundland and Labrador.

== In Christianity ==
In England, prior to the 19th century, most parish churches were surrounded by a burial ground. Particularly in the 19th century, the churchyard was referred to by a number of gentle, less stark terms, including "God's Acre". The term is less used today but is still employed when drawing attention to the field-like quality rather than the disposal function. For example, the God's Acre Project is a national (UK) project which "recognises churchyards and cemeteries as significant areas for flora, fauna and social history and seeks to provide advice and guidance for their management".

=== Moravians ===
It has become the traditional name given to the graveyards of Congregations of the Moravian Church. The first Moravian God's Acre was begun in 1730 on the western slope of the Hutberg (“Hill of Watching”) at Herrnhut Saxony in Germany, the Moravian Mother Congregation. As the Moravian Church spread around the world, they laid out their graveyards on hilltops, also calling them Hutberg and naming the graveyard God's Acre. The name comes from the belief that the bodies of the dead are "sown as seed" in God's Acre, as in a field, so that they can rise again when Jesus Christ returns to the world. God's Acre is not literally one acre in size; many are larger or smaller.

Moravians believe strongly in equality, even in death; therefore, every stone in a God's Acre is a recumbent stone of the same material with the same proportions so that no one person stands out among the stones. The Communion of Saints is continued even in the graveyard as it reflects the continuity of the congregation. In addition, the deceased are buried by choir; to the Moravians, these were the living groups into which the congregation was originally divided to meet the needs of the members according to their age and station in life. Originally, men and women sat in their choir groups in church at worship. The burial by choir in God's Acre also reflects the way the members of the congregation sat as a worshipping community so that visually and symbolically the congregation continues in the graveyard.

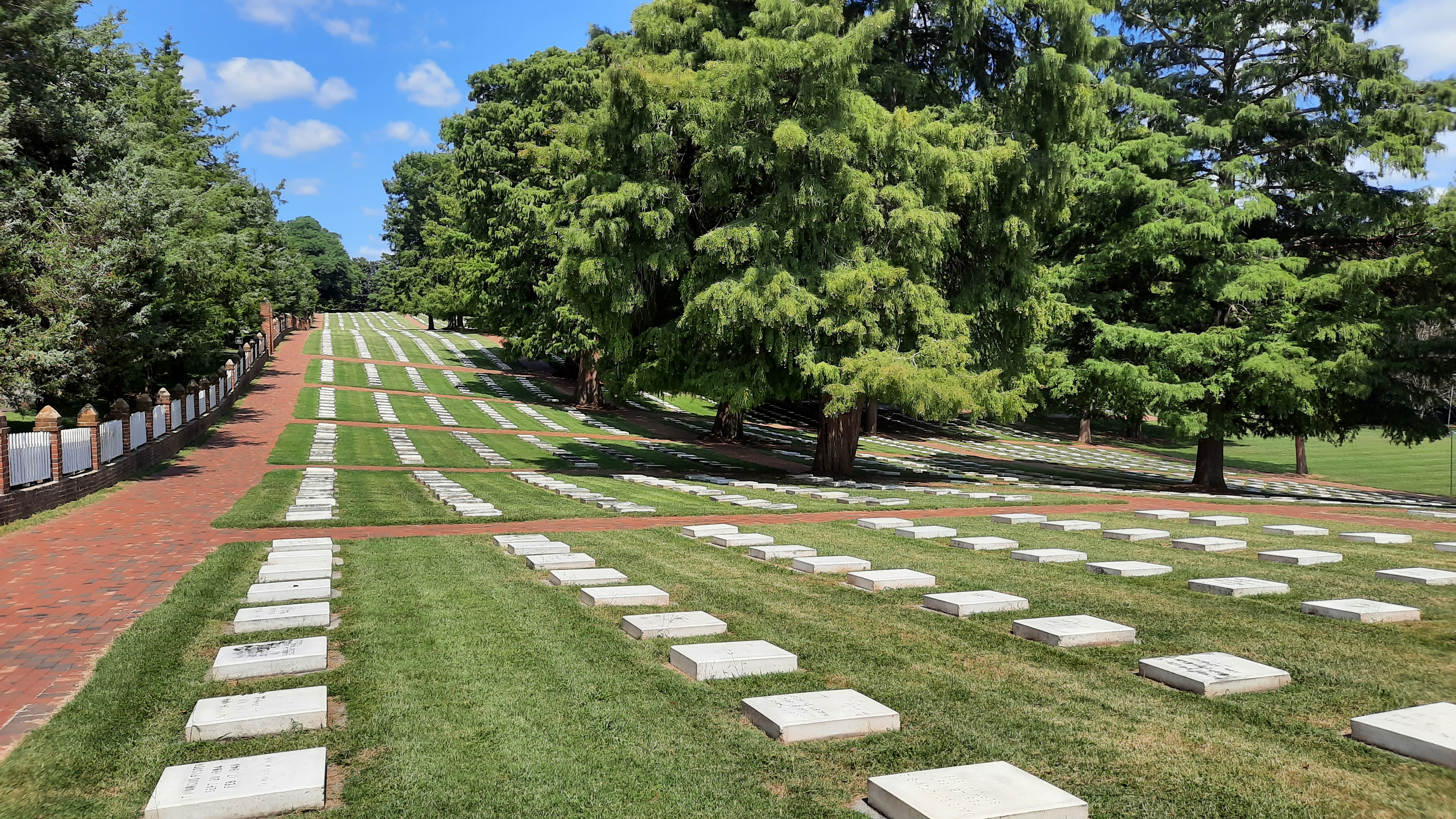
God's Acre Cemetery in Old Salem, North Carolina

Along with being separated by gender, there are also sections for people of different ages and marital statuses. The typical configuration has sections for infant girls and infant boys, girls and boys, single men and single women, and married men and married women. The deceased are buried in their respective section in the order they have died. Smaller God's Acres may combine the infant and children sections. Some larger God's Acres, such as the Salem Moravian Graveyard in Old Salem, North Carolina, may also have separate sections for those who are cremated, as their remains take up less space than those who are buried with their bodies intact.

In addition to the God's Acre on the Hutberg in Herrnhut there are striking God's Acres in almost every Moravian congregation, including in Chelsea Moravian Burial Ground (part of London) in the United Kingdom, Bethania in North Carolina and Koenigsfeld in the Black Forest of Germany. Many God's Acres also feature arched entrance gates inscribed with an appropriate Bible verse along the top; if there is more than one entrance, each gate will usually have a verse above it.

There is also the Good Friday tradition of cleaning gravestones in Moravian cemeteries. The week before Easter, families and church groups clean the uniform gravestones and decorate them with flowers, transforming the God's Acre into an almost garden-like place.

Many Moravian churches have a custom of holding an Easter sunrise service, or Resurrection Service in a God's Acre, the "Church Militant" gathering together amid the graves of the "Church Triumphant" before the Risen Christ. The opening words of the Resurrection Service, "The Lord is risen!/The Lord is risen indeed!" date from the first such Moravian-style service in Herrnhut, Germany in 1732. The liturgy for the service is a Confession of Faith drawn up by Nicolaus Ludwig, Count von Zinzendorf (1700–1760), patron and leader of the Renewed Unitas Fratrum. It is based on Martin Luther's Small Catechism.

==== Bethlehem, Pennsylvania ====
The God's Acre in Bethlehem, Pennsylvania, also known as Moravian Cemetery, is the oldest Moravian cemetery in North America and the second oldest God's Acre, just behind the one in Herrnhut. It was created in 1742 when Johannes Müller died of a fever. Müller was one of the first Moravian converts in North America. Born in Rhinebeck New York, he had personally met the first group of Moravian missionaries, the First Sea Congregation, when they arrived in Philadelphia on June 7, 1742. He then abandoned his life to move with them and establish Bethlehem. Shortly after the Moravian’s arrival in Bethlehem, Müller succumbed to a fever on June 26, 1742. His death spurred the Moravian community to make their first God's Acre in North America. Zinzendorf personally found a suitable location, a three-acre plot to the northeast of the settlement. The cemetery was in continuous use from 1742 to 1912 when all 2,716 plots were filled. At that time, it was the oldest continuously used cemetery in the United States. The cemetery consists of the distinct flat stones used in other God's Acres, and burial mounds mostly used by Indians. The occupants are interred in alphabetical order, with the poor and rich, Black and white, Indian and settler being buried side by side with no distinction. The only change to the cemetery came in 1921 when the burial mounds were flattened as they had started to suffer structural damage and threatened to destroy portions of the cemetery. The cemetery was made a National Historic Landmark in 1953. The cemetery, and its age, is also the source of many of Bethlehem's ghost stories and urban legends.

Notable burials include:

- David Nitschmann der Bischof, Bethlehem's first bishop
- James McDonald Ross, Cherokee chief John Ross' son, a Civil War veteran who died as a POW in St. Louis
- Mohican Chief Tschoop, upon whom Chingachgook in The Last of the Mohicans is modeled
- Jacob B. Kemerer, State Senator from 1899 to 1901

==== Nazareth, Pennsylvania ====
On July 16, 1741, the Moravians purchased 5,000 acres in present-day Nazareth, Pennsylvania in the Lehigh Valley region of eastern Pennsylvania. Following the success of the Girls' School in Bethlehem, Pennsylvania, Nazareth would become home to their boys’ school. A community in Nazareth quickly grew as a supplemental center for Bethlehem. They formed the church's second God's Acre in North America, also known as the Indian Cemetery, in 1744. This cemetery remained active until 1762, and Nazareth grew into the second-most important site for the church in North America. However, by 1762, the God's Acre was abandoned, and the Pennsylvania Dutch became the primary ethnic group of the region.

Following reports of Moravian missionary efforts in the region, and the fact the church buried Indians and settlers side by side with no distinction, it came to be believed that the interred in the cemetery were predominately Indians from Welagamika, a nearby village, earning its name as the Indian Cemetery. However, of the 71 burials, 67 were white Moravian settlers, and only four belonged to the Lenape Indians. The property's owner, John Jordan Jr., gifted the land to the Moravian Historical Society in 1867.

The Jordan family had built a pavilion over the burial site which was demolished in favor of a marble Obelisk dedicated by Robert Haas later in 1867. In 1916, a two-story structure was built at the summit of the hill known as Indian Tower which has served numerous purposes throughout its existence, including as a Repeater station during WWII before ownership was transferred to the Nazareth Moravian Church. The church has struggled to maintain the tower from vandalism citing the cost of repairing the tower, including an instance of vandalism two days after a restoration effort. The tower has also been the source of several of Nazareth's persisting ghost stories. The obelisk is a National Historic Landmark while the tower is a state landmark.

==== Salem, North Carolina ====
August Gottlieb Spangenberg founded Salem, North Carolina as the second Moravian missionary colony in North America. A Choir System was implemented and in 1771 the first of the settlers, John Birkhead, died, and as such a God's Acre was established in the settlement. Over 7,000 Moravians are buried on the plot with 20 by 24 inch flat headstones aligned in chronological order. As the city has grown around the God's Acre, the undeveloped plot has become a sort of oasis in the urban downtown. Unlike other God's Acres in North America, the God's Acre in Winston-Salem is still in use by the Salem Congregation, a group of 13 Moravian churches in the city, making it one of the oldest continuously used burial grounds in North America.

== Blackville, South Carolina ==
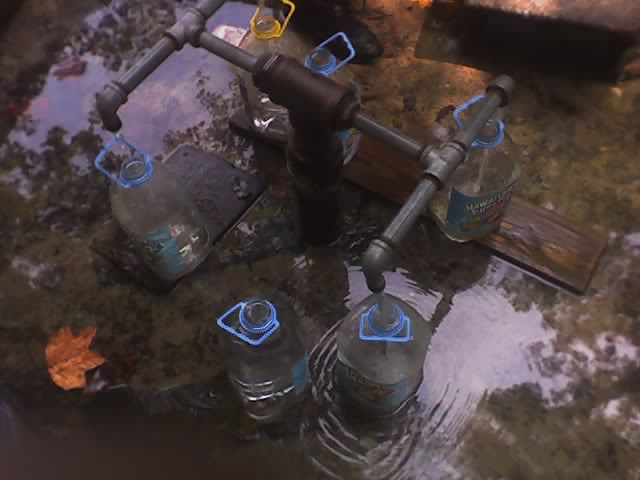
Water being retrieved from God's Acre Healing Spring

God's Acre also refers to a small patch of land whose legal owner is "God Almighty". The land includes a natural spring whose water, local tradition holds, has healing powers. Located near Blackville, South Carolina, the land was owned by L. P. "Lute" Boylston until 1944 when he died. In his will, Boylston gave the land to "God Almighty" to ensure that the water from its spring would always be free for anyone to drink. Coordinates: 33.392160°N 81.273276°W The spring is listed as part of the South Carolina National Heritage Corridor. There is also a nearby historical marker on SC 3.

== New Canaan, Connecticut ==
A section of town in New Canaan, Connecticut, where there are three large, white churches side by side, is referred to locally as "God's Acre", although the area is actually less than an acre and the name came about because the area was once a cemetery.
