= Glennys Young =

Historian

Glennys Young is a professor of history and the chair of the history department at the University of Washington. She also is a professor of Russian studies at the Jackson School of International Studies and is affiliated with University of Washington's Comparative History of Ideas Department. From 2016 to 2019, she was the Jon Bridgman Endowed Professor in History. Her research focuses include Russia, the former Soviet Union, religion in the Soviet Union, Soviet foreign policy, Russian foreign relations, the Cold War, and 20th century Spain.

== Early life and education ==
Young graduated from Nazareth Area High School in Nazareth, Pennsylvania, in 1977. She then attended Lafayette College, and transferred to the University of Pennsylvania in 1981, where she graduated summa cum laude with a bachelor's in history. In 1989, she earned her PhD in history from the University of California, Berkeley.

== Career ==
In 1989, Young began her academic career as a visiting scholar at the Hoover Institution at Stanford University in Stanford, California. From 1990 to 1992, she worked as a lecturer at Stanford University before being hired as a professor at the University of Washington, where she received a dual appointment in the department of history and the Jackson School of International Studies.

== Selected publications ==
- Young, Glennys. The Communist Experience in the Twentieth Century: A Global History through Sources. New York: Oxford University Press, 2011. Print.
- Young, Glennys. Power and the Sacred in Revolutionary Russia: Religious Activists in the Village. University Park, Pa.: Pennsylvania State University Press, 1997. Print.
- Young, Glennys. To Russia with 'Spain': Spanish Exiles in the USSR and the Longue Durée of Soviet History. Bloomington: Slavica Publishers, Indiana University. 2014. Print.
