= Moses Tunda Tatamy =

Lenape translator and guide

Moses Tunda Tatamy (c. 1690—1760) or Tashawaylennahan was a Lenape translator and guide.

== Life ==
Tashawaylennahan was born around 1690 in New Jersey and was a translator and guide for the early settlers of New Jersey and Pennsylvania in the early 18th century. He lived near what is now Stockertown, Pennsylvania and Forks Township, Northampton County, Pennsylvania, north of Easton, Pennsylvania in the Lehigh Valley, along the Delaware River.

He moved from New Jersey as early as 1733. The Lenape were displaced from their land by the Walking Purchase, but on 28 April 1738, Tatamy was given 325 acres (1.32 km^{2}) by John, Thomas and Richard Penn, the descendants of William Penn. Worried that he would be displaced from his land, he formally purchased it in 1741 for 48 pounds, 16 shillings, and 5 pence. This made him the first native-born individual to make a formal purchase of land in Pennsylvania. After the Native Americans were forced to leave the Lehigh Valley, Tatamy petitioned the Pennsylvania Provincial Council for the right to remain on his land. In 1745, Tatamy was the first Native American baptized by David Brainerd.

He died in 1760 and around 1780, Tatamy's neighbors, Henry and Matthias Stecher, claimed the property, and transferred it to William Allen. Tatamy's widow was listed on the 1790 United States census.

== Land Claim ==
In 2003 two Delaware Indian tribes based in Oklahoma claimed the land once owned by Tatamy. At the time of the lawsuit, the parcel was occupied by Binney & Smith, the maker of Crayola crayons, as well as 25 single-family homes. The tribes went to court to regain title to the land with the intention of opening a casino.

A federal judge dismissed the case in 2004, and the 3rd U.S. Circuit Court of Appeals rejected the case in 2006. Both courts agreed that while the Lenape may have been cheated out of their lands through the Walking Purchase, William Penn had the authority to seize the land. The US Supreme Court refused to review the ruling later that year.

== Legacy ==
Tatamy, Pennsylvania in the Lehigh Valley is named for him.
