= Nazareth Historic District =

Historic district in Pennsylvania, United States

- U.S. National Register of Historic Places
- U.S. Historic district
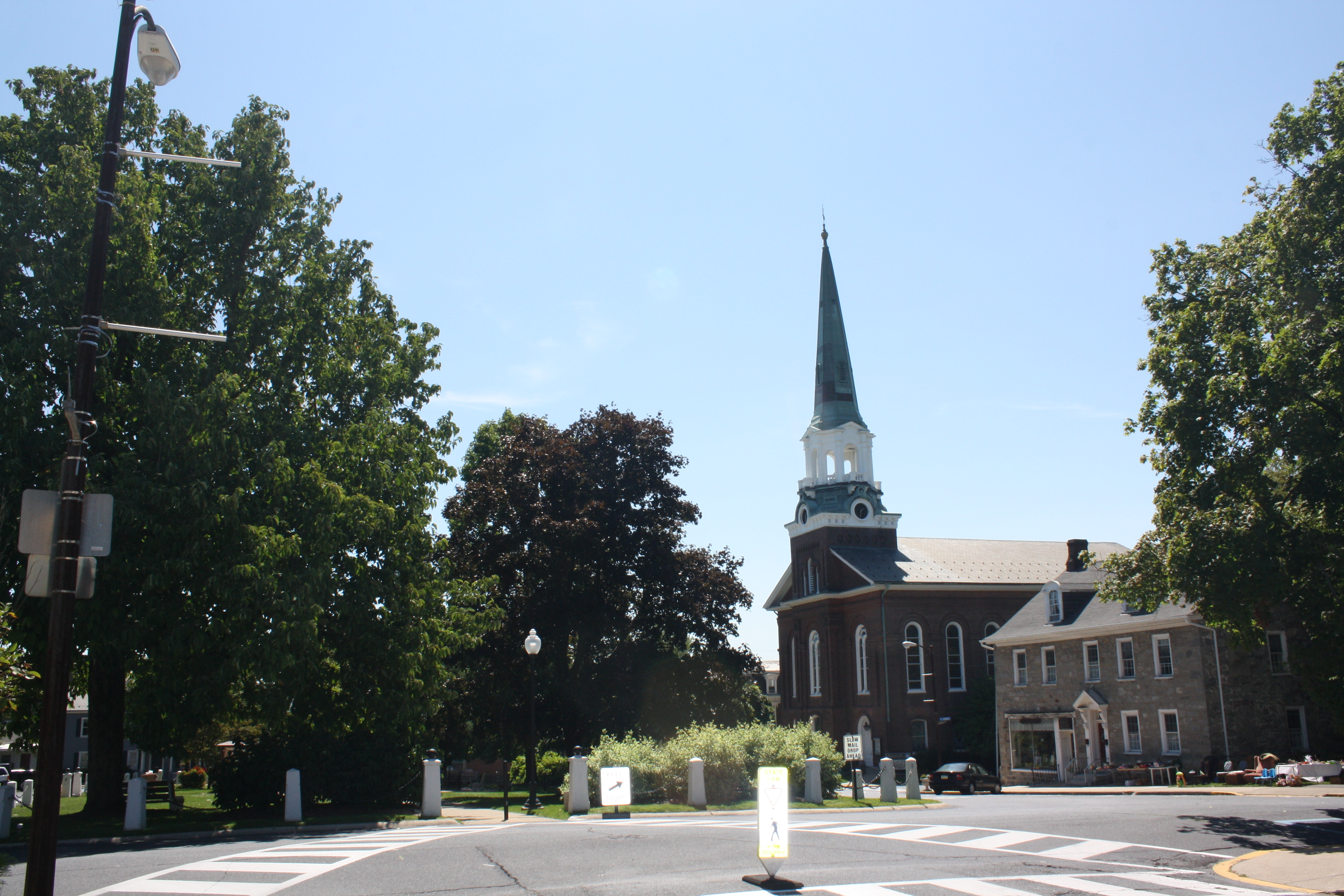
- Center Square. Nazareth Moravian Church. August 2013.

- Location within Pennsylvania Location within the United States
- Location: Centered on Center and Main Sts., Nazareth, Pennsylvania
- Coordinates: 40°44′31″N 75°18′39″W
- Area: 188 acres (76 ha)
- Built: 1858
- Architectural style: Late 19th And 20th Century Revivals, Late Victorian, Moravian
- NRHP reference No.: 88001203
- Added to NRHP: August 11, 1988

The Nazareth Historic District is a national historic district located in the center of the Borough of Nazareth, Northampton County, Pennsylvania. It is located ten miles northeast of Bethlehem and seven miles northwest of Easton.

It was added to the National Register of Historic Places in 1988.

== History ==
Mostly residential in nature, with commercial buildings located in its central section, the Nazareth Historic District was laid out in a grid pattern between the mid-eighteenth and early twentieth centuries, and includes 503 contributing buildings and one contributing site (Moravian Congregational Cemetery). The buildings are primarily 2 1/2 stories tall and constructed of brick or frame. Most of the remaining stone buildings were built prior to 1858; in that year Nazareth came under civil jurisdiction after having been a closed Moravian settlement.

Notable non-residential buildings include the Nazareth Moravian Church (1861), St. John's U.C.C. Church (1905–1907), and St. John's Lutheran Church (1858). Located in the district is the separately listed Nazareth Hall Tract.

It was added to the National Register of Historic Places in 1988.

== Gallery ==
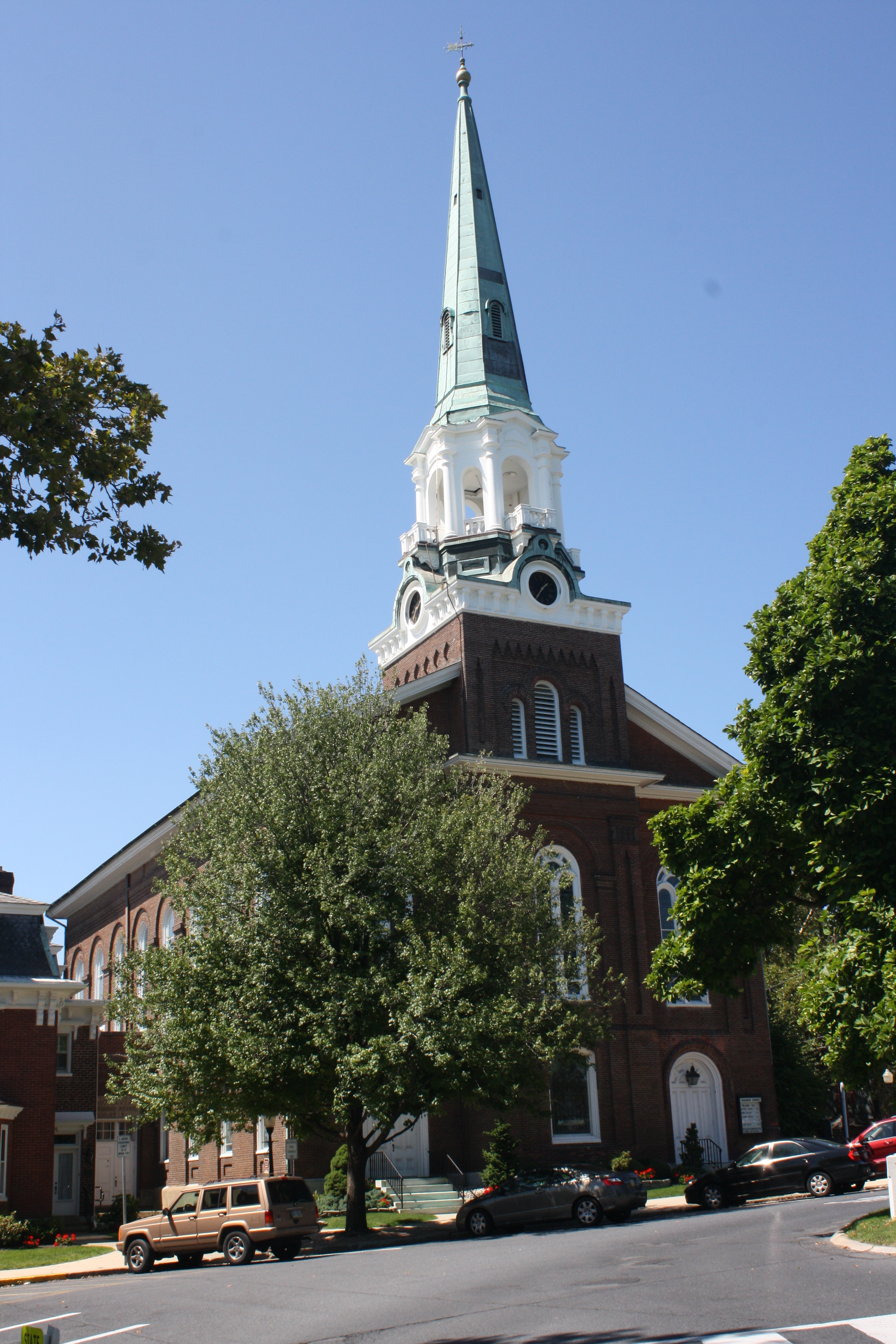
Nazareth Moravian Church

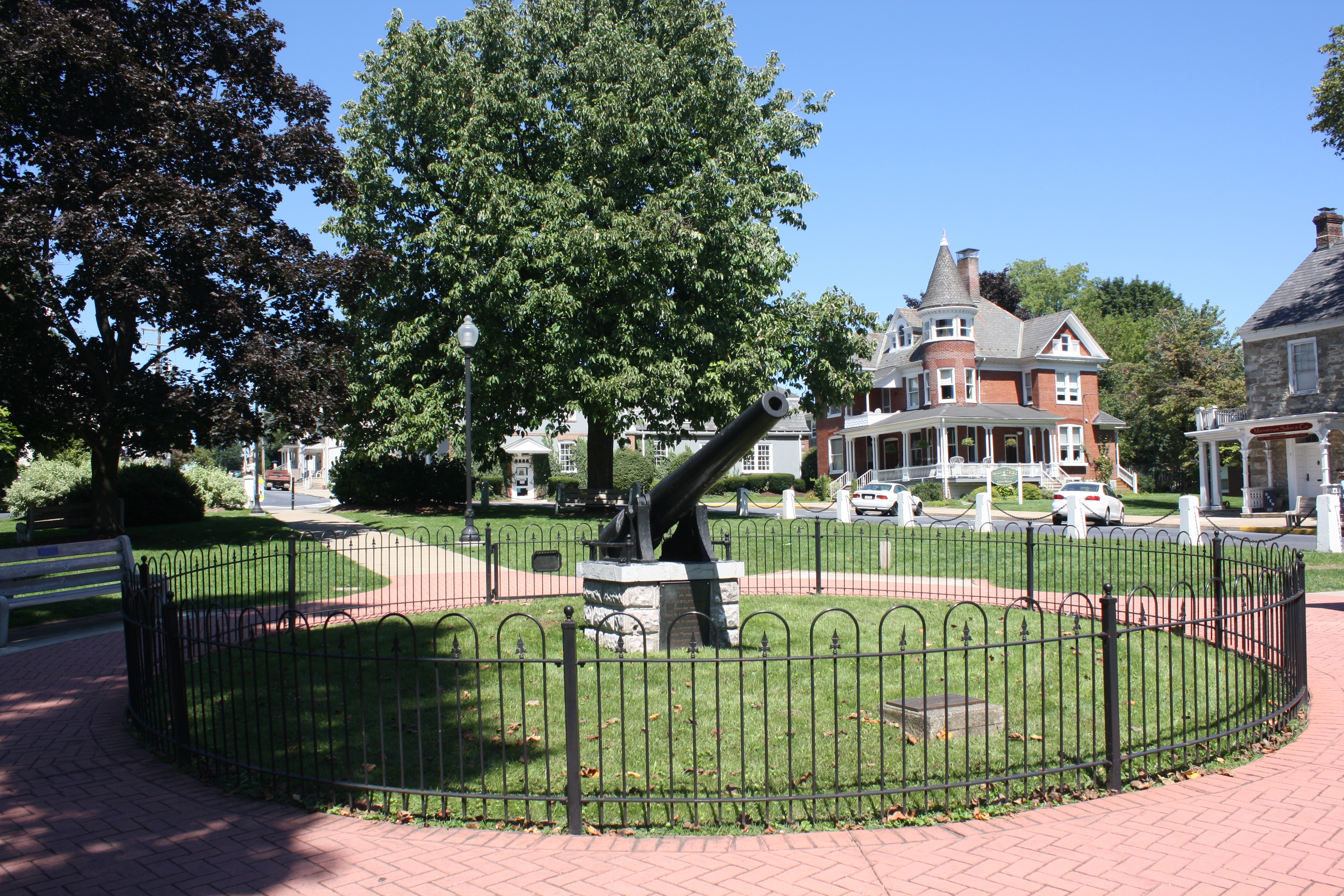
Civil War Monument on Center Square

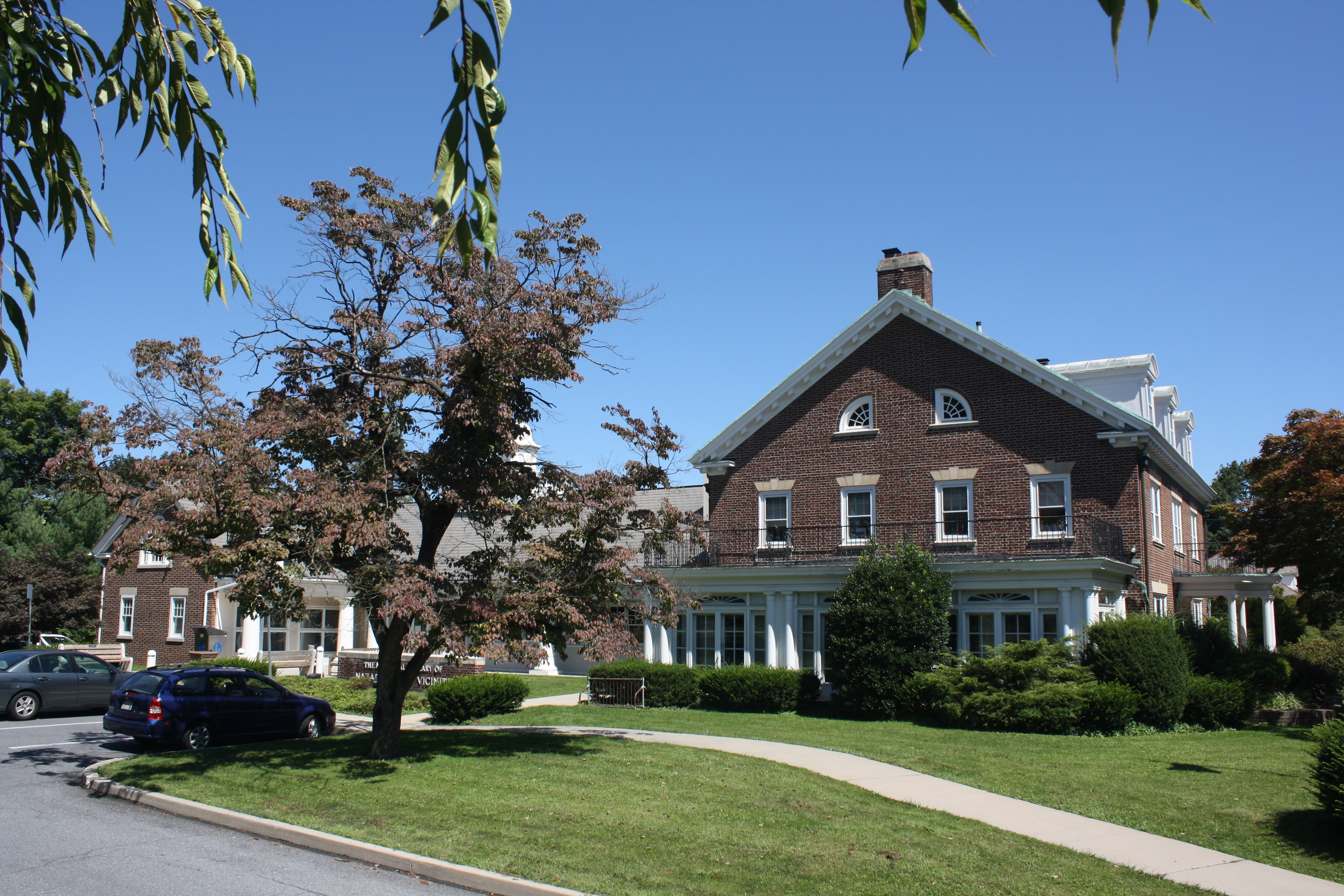
Memorial Library of Nazareth

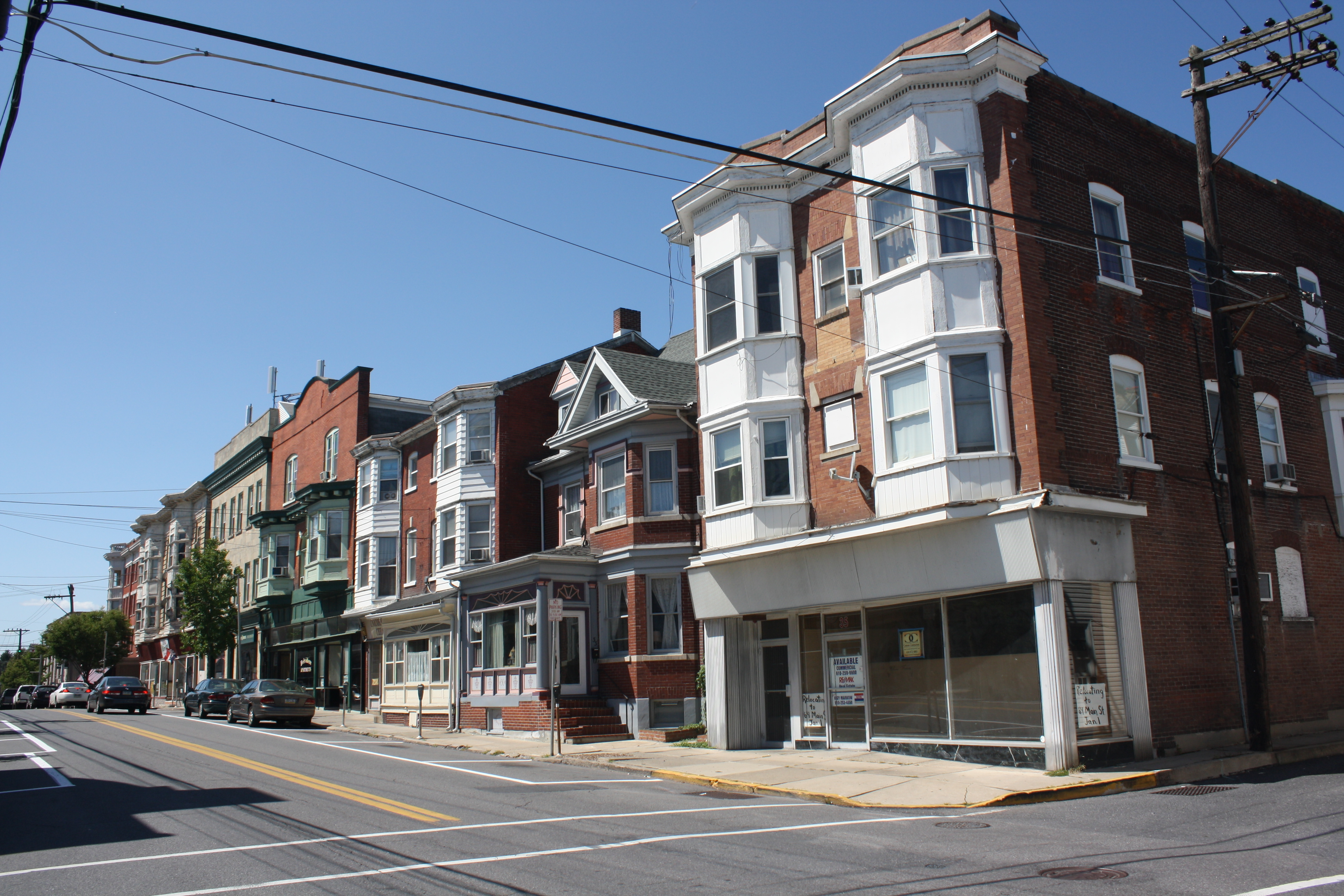
Belvidere Street

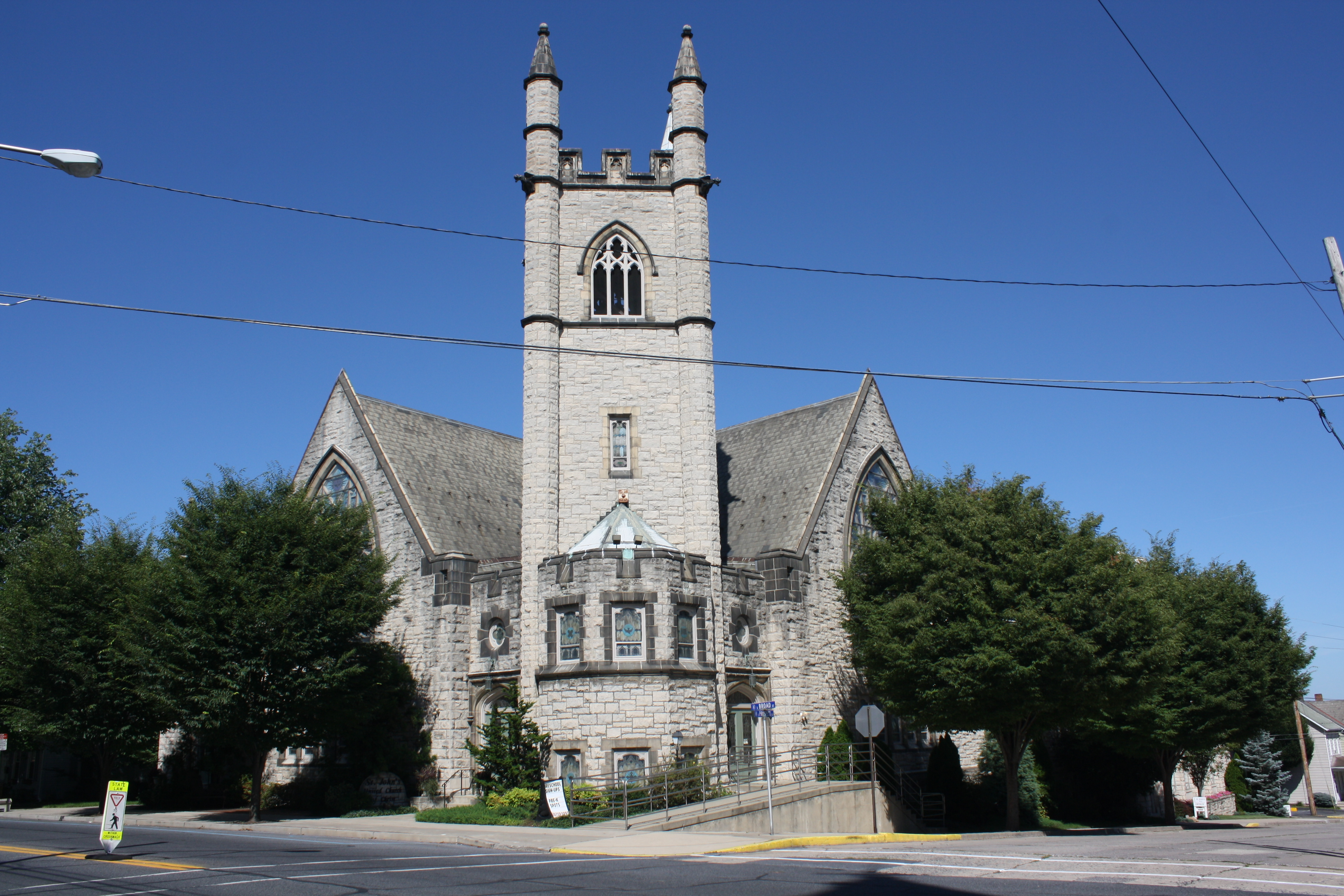
St. John's United Church of Christ (1906)
