= Tatamy, Pennsylvania =

Borough in Pennsylvania, US

Borough of Tatamy
- Borough
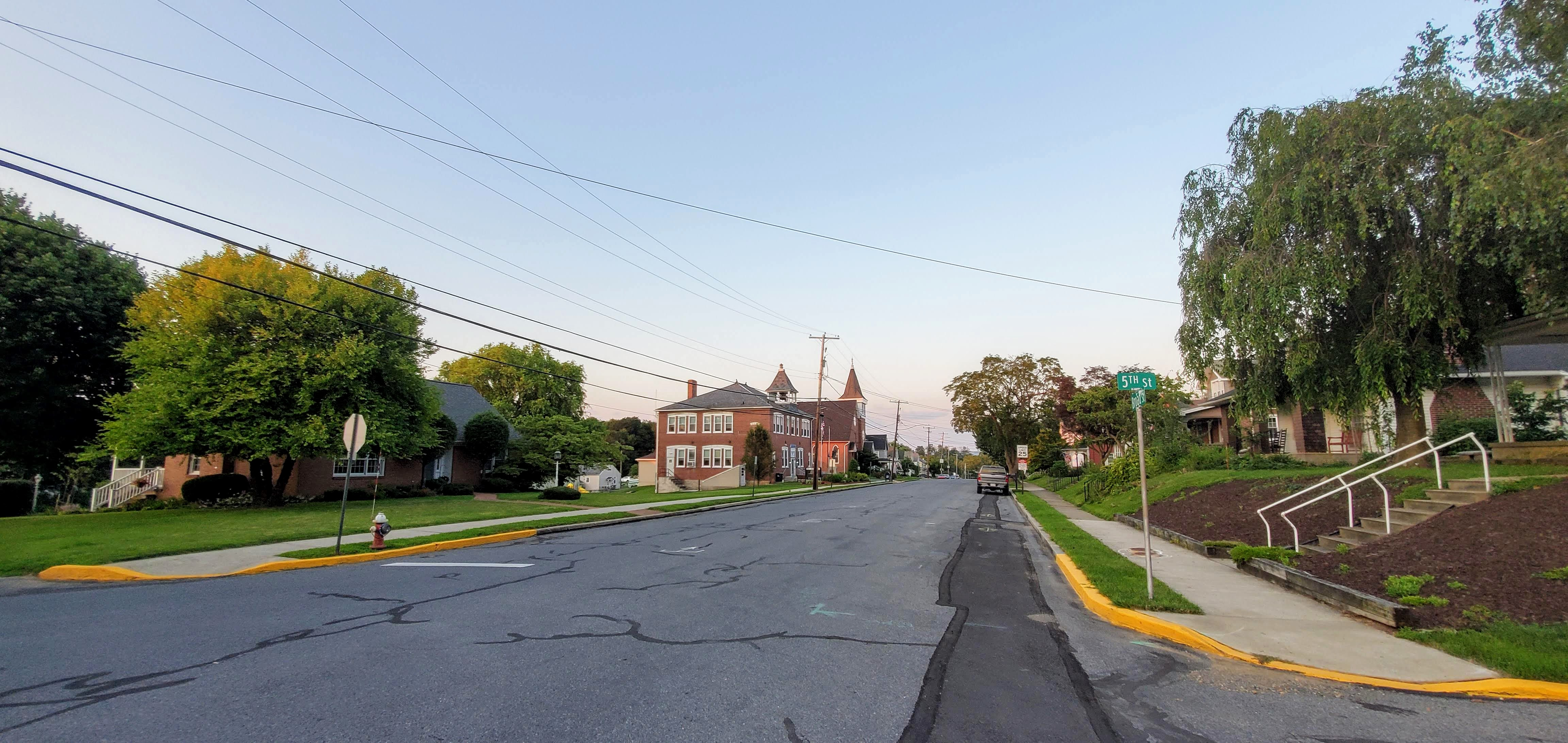
- 5th and Broad Streets in Tatamy, July 2021

- Seal

- Location of Tatamy in Northampton County, Pennsylvania (left) and of Northampton County in Pennsylvania (right)

- Location of Tatamy in Pennsylvania Tatamy (the United States)
- Coordinates: 40°44′27″N 75°15′12″W
- Country: United States
- State: Pennsylvania
- County: Northampton
- Incorporated: June 12, 1893
- Settled: 1771
- Named after: Moses Tunda Tatamy

Government
  - Mayor: James Pallante

Area
  - Borough: 0.57 sq mi (1.47 km^{2})
  - Land: 0.56 sq mi (1.44 km^{2})
  - Water: 0.012 sq mi (0.03 km^{2})
- Elevation: 387 ft (118 m)

Population (2020)
  - Borough: 1,203
  - Density: 2,168.5/sq mi (837.28/km^{2})
  - Metro: 865,310 (US: 68th)
- Time zone: UTC-5 (EST)
  - Summer (DST): UTC-4 (EDT)
- ZIP Code: 18085
- Area codes: 610 and 484
- FIPS code: 42-76144
- Primary airport: Lehigh Valley International Airport
- Major hospital: Lehigh Valley Hospital–Cedar Crest
- School district: Nazareth Area
- Website: www.tatamypa.com

Tatamy is a borough in Northampton County, Pennsylvania, United States. The borough's population was 1,203 as of the 2020 census. Tatamy is part of the Lehigh Valley metropolitan area, which had a population of 861,899 and was the 68th most populous metropolitan area in the U.S. as of the 2020 census.

== History ==
The borough is named for Moses Tunda Tatamy, a Native American leader. Tatamy was awarded the land that would become the borough by the Penn family for his work as an interpreter, and in 1745 was the first American Indian to be baptized by David Brainerd. In 1771 the territory would be purchased by one Michael Messinger Sr. who plotted a village. In 1892 the village had become large enough to warrant incorporation as a borough, and was incorporated on June 12, 1893, by Judge H.J. Reeder.

== Geography ==
Tatamy is located at 40°44′27″N 75°15′12″W. According to the U.S. Census Bureau, the borough has a total area of 0.5 square miles (1.3 km^{2}), all land.

== Transportation ==
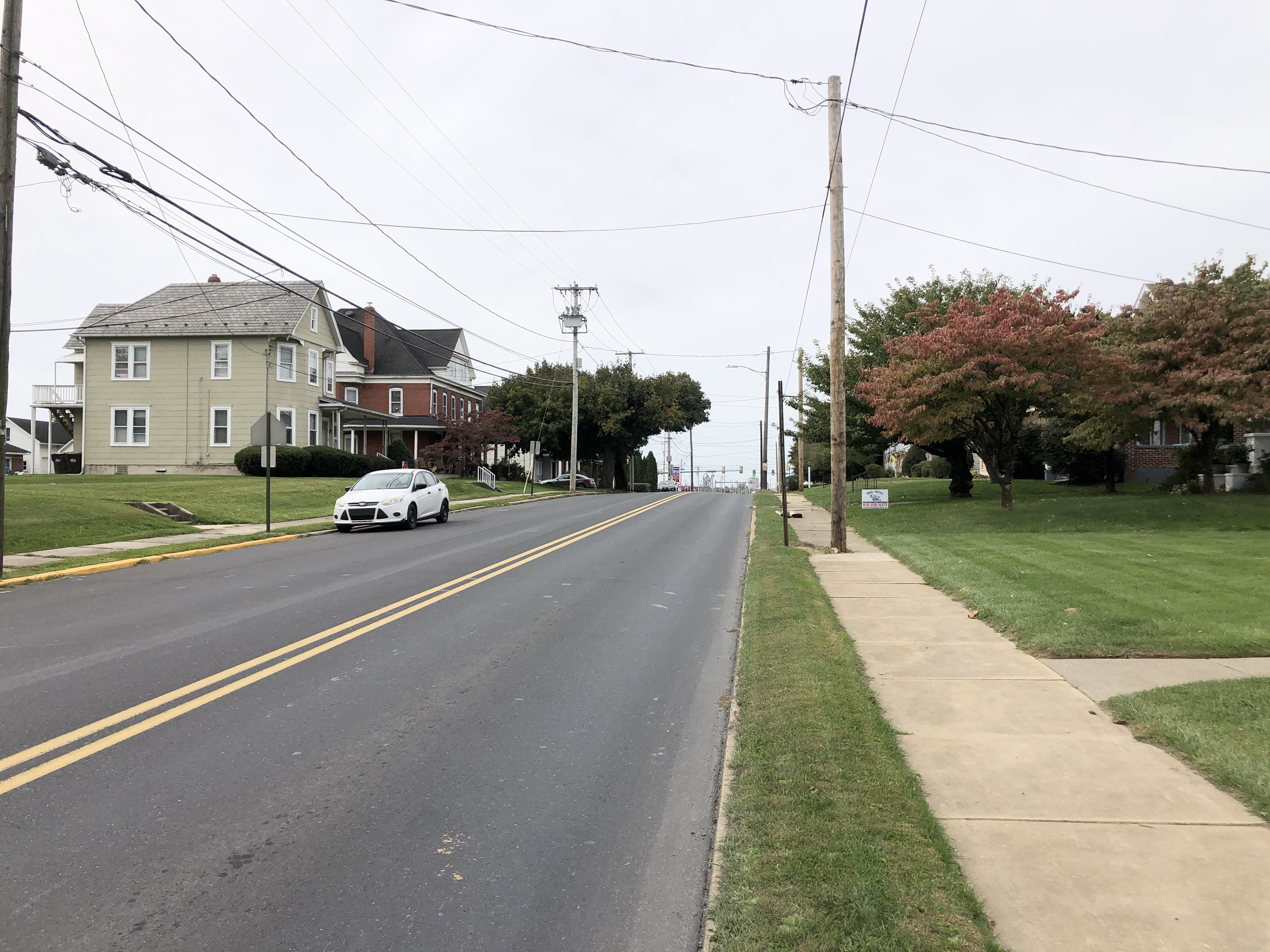
Main Street in Tatamy

As of 2021, there were 6.59 miles (10.61 km) of public roads in Tatamy, of which 1.76 miles (2.83 km) were maintained by the Pennsylvania Department of Transportation (PennDOT) and 4.83 miles (7.77 km) were maintained by the borough.

Main thoroughfares through the borough include Main Street and Eighth Street. Pennsylvania Route 33 passes to the west in neighboring Palmer Township.

== Demographics ==
Historical population
Census	Pop.	Note	%±
1900	260		—
1910	512		96.9%
1920	478		−6.6%
1930	592		23.8%
1940	604		2.0%
1950	681		12.7%
1960	762		11.9%
1970	891		16.9%
1980	910		2.1%
1990	873		−4.1%
2000	930		6.5%
2010	1,203		29.4%
2020	1,203		0.0%
U.S. Decennial Census

As of the 2000 census, there were 930 people, 352 households, and 267 families residing in the borough. The population density was 1,789.1 inhabitants per square mile (690.8/km^{2}). There were 356 housing units at an average density of 684.9 per square mile (264.4/km^{2}). The racial makeup of the borough was 98.49% White, 0.22% African American, 0.32% Native American, 0.11% Asian, 0.43% from other races, and 0.43% from two or more races. Hispanic or Latino of any race were 0.97% of the population.

There were 352 households, out of which 32.4% had children under the age of 18 living with them, 63.6% were married couples living together, 8.2% had a female householder with no husband present, and 24.1% were non-families. 21.0% of all households were made up of individuals, and 10.2% had someone living alone who was 65 years of age or older. The average household size was 2.63 and the average family size was 3.03.

In the borough, the population was spread out, with 24.8% under the age of 18, 6.0% from 18 to 24, 28.9% from 25 to 44, 28.5% from 45 to 64, and 11.7% who were 65 years of age or older. The median age was 40 years. For every 100 females there were 91.0 males. For every 100 females age 18 and over, there were 89.4 males. The median income for a household in the borough was $48,942, and the median income for a family was $55,750. Males had a median income of $38,333 versus $26,797 for females. The per capita income for the borough was $21,759. About 2.9% of families and 3.8% of the population were below the poverty line, including 6.2% of those under age 18 and 5.0% of those age 65 or over.

== Public education ==
Tatamy is served by the Nazareth Area School District. High school students attend Nazareth Area High School in Nazareth.
