= Jahan Dotson =

American football player (born 2000)

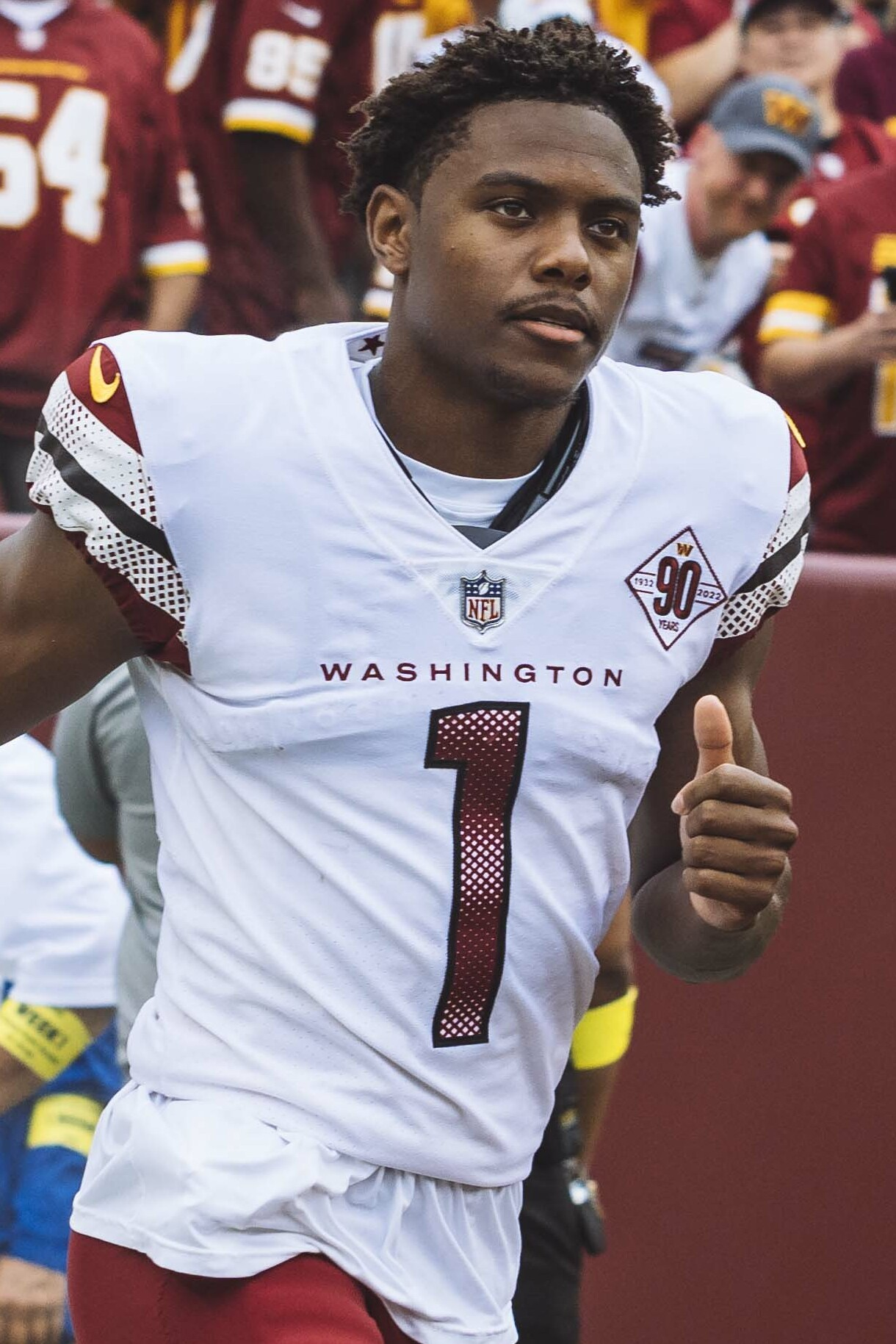
- Dotson with the Washington Commanders in 2022

No. 4 – Atlanta Falcons
- Position: Wide receiver
- Roster status: Active

Personal information
- Born: March 22, 2000 (age 26); Newark, New Jersey, U.S.
- Listed height: 5 ft 11 in (1.80 m)
- Listed weight: 184 lb (83 kg)

Career information
- High school: Nazareth Area (Nazareth, Pennsylvania)
- College: Penn State (2018–2021)
- NFL draft: 2022: 1st round, 16th overall pick

Career history
- Washington Commanders (2022–2023); Philadelphia Eagles (2024–2025); Atlanta Falcons (2026–present)

Awards and highlights
- Super Bowl champion (LIX); First-team All-Big Ten (2021); Third-team All-Big Ten (2020)

Career NFL statistics as of Week 10, 2026
- Receptions: 140
- Receiving yards: 1,935
- Receiving touchdowns: 14
- Stats at Pro Football Reference

Jahan Waltè Dotson (/dʒəˈhɑːn/ jə-HAHN; born March 22, 2000) is an American professional football wide receiver for the Atlanta Falcons of the National Football League (NFL). He played college football for the Penn State Nittany Lions and was selected by the Washington Commanders in the first round of the 2022 NFL draft. Dotson was traded to the Philadelphia Eagles in 2024, and became a Super Bowl champion that season.

== Early life ==
Dotson was born on March 22, 2000, in Newark, New Jersey, and grew up in nearby East Orange, before moving to Pennsylvania. He attended Nazareth Area High School in Nazareth, Pennsylvania in the Lehigh Valley. He transferred to Peddie School in Hightstown, New Jersey for his junior year, but then returned to Nazareth High School for his senior year in 2017. He set school career records at Nazareth for most receptions (187), most receiving yards (2,755), and most touchdowns (40).

Dotson originally committed to play college football at UCLA but later rescinded his commitment to play for Penn State.

College recruiting
Name	Hometown	School	Height	Weight	Commit date
Jahan Dotson; WR	Nazareth, Pennsylvania	Nazareth Area	5 ft 11 in (1.80 m)	165 lb (75 kg)	Dec 20, 2017
Jahan Dotson; WR	Recruit ratings: Rivals: 247Sports: ESPN:				
Overall recruit ranking:
Note: In many cases, Scout, Rivals, 247Sports, On3, and ESPN may conflict in their listings of height and weight.; In these cases, the average was taken. ESPN grades are on a 100-point scale.; Sources: "2018 Team Ranking". Rivals.com.

== College career ==
Dotson appeared in eight games for the Penn State Nittany Lions as a freshman in the 2018 season and made four starts, recording 13 receptions for 203 yards.

As a sophomore in the 2019 season, Dotson started all 13 games and had 27 receptions for 488 yards and five touchdowns.

In the 2020 season, as a junior, Dotson was Penn State's leading receiver. Against the Ohio State Buckeyes, Dotson recorded eight catches for 144 yards and three touchdowns. Against Michigan State, Dotson became the third Big Ten player since 2000 to have a punt return touchdown and 100 receiving yards in the same game. Dotson finished the 2020 season with 884 receiving yards and eight touchdowns, and was named third-team All-Big Ten for the season.

As a senior in the 2021 season, Dotson recorded 11 receptions for 242 yards and 3 touchdowns in Penn State's win over Maryland, breaking Deon Butler's school record for receiving yards in a game.

In December 2021, announced his intention to enter the 2022 NFL draft. In May 2022, he graduated from Penn State with a degree in telecommunications.

Dotson finished his Penn State career second in school history in both career (183) and single-season (91 in 2021) receptions, fourth in career receiving yards (2,757), second in single-season receiving yards (1,182 in 2021), and second in both career (25) and single-season (12 in 2021) touchdowns.

== Professional career ==
Pre-draft measurables
Height	Weight	Arm length	Hand span	Wingspan	40-yard dash	10-yard split	20-yard split	Three-cone drill	Vertical jump	Broad jump	Bench press
5 ft 10 5/8 in (1.79 m)	178 lb (81 kg)	30 3/4 in (0.78 m)	9 1/2 in (0.24 m)	6 ft 2 in (1.88 m)	4.43 s	1.55 s	2.57 s	7.28 s	36 in (0.91 m)	10 ft 1 in (3.07 m)	15 reps
All values from NFL Combine/Pro Day

=== Washington Commanders ===
Dotson was selected by the Washington Commanders in the first round (16th overall) of the 2022 NFL draft. The team originally had the 11th selection before trading down and picking up third and fourth round picks later in the draft. Dotson signed his four-year rookie contract, worth $15 million, on May 18, 2022.

In Dotson's debut in week 1 of the 2022 season, Dotson helped lead the Commanders to victory over the Jacksonville Jaguars, catching three passes for 40 yards and two touchdowns; he was named the week 1 Pepsi NFL Rookie of the Week.

In week 4, Dotson suffered a hamstring injury in the Commanders loss to the Dallas Cowboys. The injury sidelined him for five games, but he returned in week 10 against the Philadelphia Eagles. He was again named Pepsi NFL Rookie of the Week in week 15 after catching four passes for 105 yards and a touchdown against the New York Giants. Dotson finished his inaugural 2022 season with the Commanders with 35 receptions for 523 yards and seven touchdowns.

In week 8 of the 2023 season, against the Eagles, Dotson had eight receptions for 108 yards and a touchdown in the loss. In his second year, Dotson played in all 17 games, catching 49 balls for 518 yards and four touchdowns.

=== Philadelphia Eagles ===
On August 22, 2024, the Commanders traded Dotson and a fifth-round pick to the Philadelphia Eagles in exchange for a conditional third-round pick (higher of Eagles or Dolphins) and two seventh-round picks in the 2025 NFL draft. In the 2024 season, he had 19 receptions for 219 yards. He had a receiving touchdown in the Eagles' 22–10 win over the Packers in the Wild Card Round.

In Super Bowl LIX, he had two receptions for 42 yards in the Eagles' 40–22 championship-clinching win over the Chiefs. The first of his two catches, a 27-yard first quarter reception, had initially appeared to be a touchdown, but a subsequent booth review determined Dotson to be just short of the goal line. Nonetheless, it would set up a one-yard touchdown run by eventual Super Bowl MVP Jalen Hurts on the very next play for the game's first score en route to Philadelphia's victory.

On April 23, 2025, the Eagles declined the fifth-year option of Dotson's contract, making him a free agent in the 2026 offseason.

=== Atlanta Falcons ===
On March 12, 2026, Dotson signed a two-year, $15 million contract with the Atlanta Falcons.

== Career statistics ==
=== NFL ===
Legend
	Won the Super Bowl
**Bold**	Career High

==== Regular season ====
Year	Team	Games		Receiving					Rushing					Fumbles	
Year	Team	GP	GS	Rec	Yds	Y/R	Lng	TD	Att	Yds	Y/A	Lng	TD	Fum	Lost
2022	WAS	12	10	35	**523**	**14.9**	**61**	**7**	**2**	-7	-3.5	3	0	0	0
2023	WAS	17	16	**49**	518	10.6	33	4	0	0	–	–	0	0	0
2024	PHI	17	6	19	216	11.4	36	0	1	**13**	13.0	**13**	0	0	0
2025	PHI	17	10	18	262	14.6	51	1	0	0	0.0	0	0	0	0
2026	ATL	10	9	19	416	21.9	76	2	0	0	0.0	0	0	0	0
Career		73	51	140	1,935	13.8	76	14	3	6	2.0	13	0	0	0

==== Postseason ====
Year	Team	Games		Receiving					Fumbles	
Year	Team	GP	GS	Rec	Yds	Avg	Lng	TD	Fum	Lost
2024	PHI	**4**	**2**	**3**	**53**	**17.7**	**27**	**1**	0	0
Career		4	2	3	53	17.7	27	1	0	0

=== College ===
Season	GP	Receptions				Rushing			
Season	GP	Rec	Yds	Avg	TD	Att	Yds	Avg	TD
2018	8	13	203	15.6	0	0	0	0.0	0
2019	13	27	488	18.1	5	2	0	0.0	0
2020	9	52	884	17.0	8	0	0	0.0	0
2021	12	91	1,182	13.0	12	6	18	3.0	1
Career	42	183	2,757	15.1	25	6	18	3.0	1
