= Nazareth Area School District =

School district in Pennsylvania

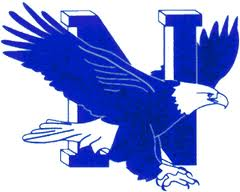

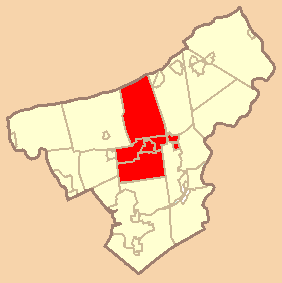
- Location of Nazareth Area School District in Northampton County, Pennsylvania

Address
- One Education Plaza Nazareth, Northampton County, Pennsylvania, 18064; United States

District information
- Superintendent: Isabel C. Resende
- Schools: Six, including Nazareth Area High School
- Budget: $104.4 million
- NCES District ID: 4216380

Students and staff
- Students: 4,885 (2024-25)
- Faculty: 342.0 (on an FTE basis)
- Student–teacher ratio: 14.28
- Athletic conference: Eastern Pennsylvania Conference
- District mascot: Blue Eagle
- Colors: Blue, White, and Black

Other information
- Website: www.nazarethasd.k12.pa.us

Nazareth Area School District is a public school district located in Northampton County, Pennsylvania in the Lehigh Valley region of eastern Pennsylvania. It serves the boroughs of Nazareth, Stockertown, and Tatamy, and the townships of Bushkill, Lower Nazareth, and Upper Nazareth.

Students in grades nine through 12 attend Nazareth Area High School in Nazareth. Students in grades seven and eight attend Nazareth Area Middle School, and students in grades five and six attend Nazareth Area Intermediate School. The district maintains three elementary schools for kindergarten through fourth grade, Kenneth N. Butz, Floyd R. Shafer, and Lower Nazareth.

As of the 2024–25 school year, the school district had a total enrollment of 4,885 students between all six of its schools, according to National Center for Education Statistics data. The current superintendent of schools is Isabel C. Resende.

== Schools ==
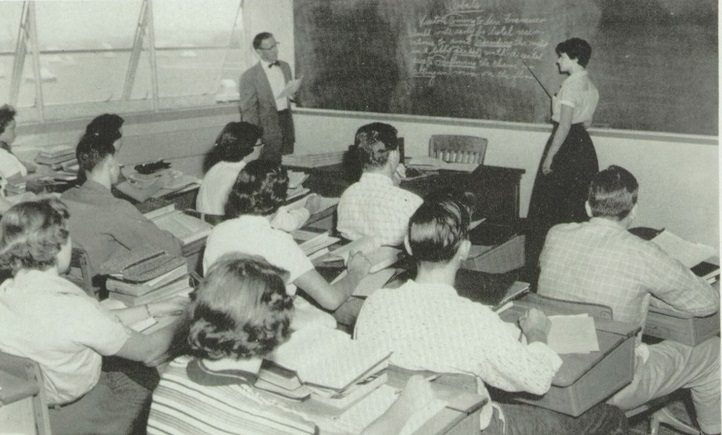
Students at Nazareth Area High School in Nazareth, Pennsylvania in 1955

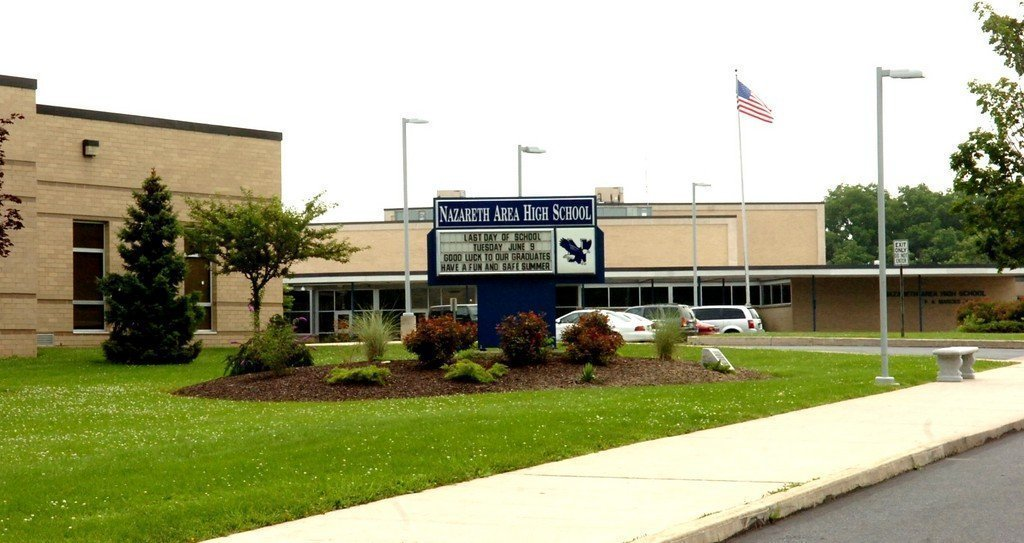
Nazareth Area High School in Nazareth, Pennsylvania in April 2013

- Nazareth Area High School - Grades 9-12
- Nazareth Area Middle School - Grades 7-8
- Nazareth Area Intermediate School - Grades 5-6
- Kenneth N. Butz, Jr. Elementary School - Grades K-4
- Floyd R. Shafer Elementary School - Grades K-4
- Lower Nazareth Elementary School - Grades K-4

=== Middle school ===
Due to population growth, the Nazareth Area School District constructed a new middle school for grades seven and eight with approximately 800 students. The project included a new $7 million swimming pool. The new building is located on Friedenstahl Avenue in Upper Nazareth Township adjacent to the high school campus. The school was completed in 2009 in time for the 2009-2010 school year. It cost an estimated total of $57 million.

With the opening of the new middle school in 2009, the Nazareth area underwent a district-wide grade reconfiguration. Kindergarten through third grade students remained in the elementary schools. Fourth, fifth, and sixth grade students were placed in a new intermediate level school, Nazareth Area Intermediate School, utilizing the former middle school building at 355 Tatamy Road. Seventh and eighth grade students now attend the new middle school. Students at Nazareth Area High School, which serves ninth through 12th grade students, were not impacted by the changes.

== Statistics ==
A 2006 survey distributed to every household in the Nazareth Area School District, which had a 19% participation rate, reported the following residency and attendance statistics in the district:

=== Residency in district ===
- 30.9% of respondents lived in Bushkill Township
- 23.3% lived in Lower Nazareth Township
- 19.7% lived in Upper Nazareth Township
- 18.8% lived in the borough of Nazareth
- 2.5% lived in the borough of Stockertown.
- 4.4% lived in the borough of Tatamy.

=== Attendance distribution ===
40.8% of responding households had NASD students, of those:

- 18% had children attending Bushkill Elementary School
- 17% had children attending Lower Nazareth Elementary School
- 18% had children attending Floyd R. Shafer Elementary School
- 37% had children attending Nazareth Area Middle School
- 43% had children attending Nazareth Area High School

== Communication ==
Attuned to the importance of parent and school communication, the district has established a parental web portal, a web friendly, state-of-the-art communication tool on its website. School events and School Board meetings are posted on the district website calendar. Two regional newspapers, The Morning Call in Allentown and The Express-Times in Easton, both cover the school district and its schools.

As of January 2011, Nazareth Area High School began utilizing the Eagle Call system, allowing students to receive school-related text messages and e-mails directly on mobile devices and cell phones.
