= Heredity (journal) =

Peer-reviewed scientific journal

- Discipline: Genetics, heredity
- Language: English
- Edited by: Sara Goodacre

Publication details
- History: 1947–present
- Publisher: Nature Portfolio for The Genetics Society
- Frequency: Monthly
- Open access: Hybrid
- Impact factor: 3.832 (2021)

Standard abbreviations
- ISO 4: Heredity (Hered.)

Indexing
- CODEN: HDTYAT
- ISSN: 0018-067X (print); 1365-2540 (web)
- OCLC no.: 01752017

Links
- Journal homepage; Online archive

Heredity is a monthly peer-reviewed scientific journal published by Nature Portfolio. It covers heredity in a biological sense, i.e. genetics. The journal was founded by Ronald Fisher and C. D. Darlington in 1947 and is the official journal of The Genetics Society. From 1996 the publishing was taken over by Nature Portfolio. The editor-in-chief is Louise J. Johnson.

According to the Journal Citation Reports, the journal has a 2021 impact factor of 3.832, ranking it 61st out of 173 journals in the category "Ecology", 19th out of 51 journals in the category "Evolutionary Biology", and 79th out of 175 journals in the category "Genetics & Heredity".
