= Sara Goodacre =

British arachnologist

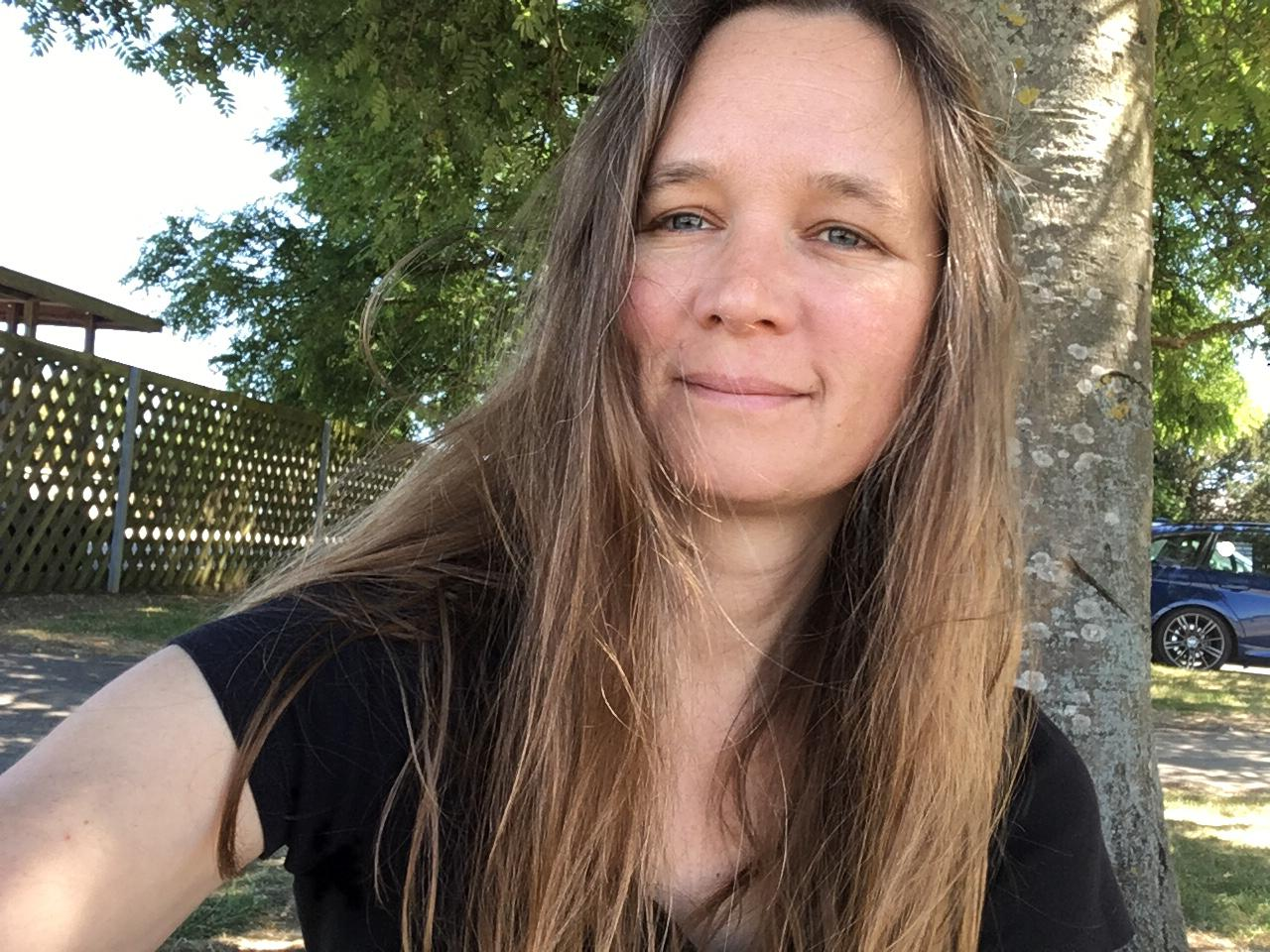
- Born: Sara L. Goodacre
- Education: University of Cambridge (BA); University of Nottingham (PhD)
- Known for: SpiderLab
- Scientific career
- Fields: Evolutionary genetics Population genetics Conservation genetics Arachnology
- Workplaces: University of East Anglia; University of Nottingham; University of Oxford
- Thesis: Studies on the evolution of Partula (1999)
- Website: arachnotts.com

Sara L. Goodacre is a research geneticist and Professor of Evolutionary Biology and Genetics at the University of Nottingham. She is the lead for the Open Air Laboratories, a citizen science project that engages people with the outdoor environment and Deputy Director of the Biotechnology and Biological Sciences Doctoral Training Programme.

== Education ==
Goodacre studied the Natural Sciences Tripos at the University of Cambridge as a student of Gonville and Caius College, Cambridge, graduating in 1995. Goodacre joined the University of Nottingham for her graduate studies and earned her PhD in 1999 for studies on the evolution of Partula land snails.

== Career ==
Goodacre joined the University of Oxford as a research fellow in 1999. She was a research fellow at the University of East Anglia from 2002. She was described by the BBC as Spider Woman. As of 2018, Goodacre is based at the University of Nottingham, where she founded the SpiderLab in 2007 and leads the ArachNotts research group. As a geneticist, Goodacre studies the evolution, population and conservation of spiders. She monitored the mating behaviour and sex ratio of the linyphiid spider Pityohyphantes phrygianus with Bengt Gunnarsson at the University of Gothenburg. She also studied the silk of Mygalomorphae spiders and the genetic diversity of spider silk genes and found evidence for antimicrobial activity in the silk of common house spiders. She found that Erigone atra, a pest controlling spider, uses long-distance airborne dispersal. Goodacre contributed to the 2011 book Spider Physiology and Behaviour: Physiology. In 2015 Goodacre reported that spiders could survive "sailing" across oceans.

ArachNotts study the diving bell spider and its silk, which it uses to build a diving bell in which it stores air underwater, and have so far identified some of the silk genes used by this spider. They also work on the relationship between spiders and the microbes that they carry with them, including the mating behaviour and sex-ratio of offspring, the ecology and biological control potential of spiders in agriculture and the use of genetic tools in the conservation of the endangered raft spider.

Goodacre worked alongside chemists at the University of Nottingham to create functionalised spider silk that could be used for drug delivery, wound healing and regenerative medicine. This involved attaching fluorescent dyes and antibiotics by click chemistry to silk synthesised by Escherichia coli. The intention is this synthetic silk can slowly deliver antibiotics or be used as a scaffold to grow new tissues. She has patented the synthesised silk (functionalised spidroin).

Goodacre created the app Spider in da House. She works to make people to be less frightened of spiders, as well as engaging the public in improving the UK's biodiversity. In June 2017, Goodacre took the SpiderLab to a series of primary schools, working in partnership with the Zoological Society of London. She appears regularly on the BBC. She has contributed to The Conversation, The Guardian and serves as an editor of both PeerJ and Heredity.
