= William Goodacre =

English cricketer

Personal information
- Full name: William Bennett Goodacre
- Born: 26 February 1873; Nottingham, England
- Died: 29 June 1948 (aged 75); Sproxton, Leicestershire, England
- Batting: Right-handed
- Role: Batter

Domestic team information
- Years: Team
- 1898–1903: Nottinghamshire

Career statistics
Competition	First-class
Matches	43
Runs scored	1,169
Batting average	18.85
100s/50s	1/4
Top score	104*
Balls bowled	805
Wickets	12
Bowling average	36.66
5 wickets in innings	–
10 wickets in match	–
Best bowling	3/30
Catches/stumpings	27/–
- Source: CricketArchive, 8 November 2024

William Bennett Goodacre (26 February 1873 – 29 June 1948) was an English first-class cricketer who played for Nottinghamshire from 1898 to 1903. He was born in Nottingham and died in Sproxton, Leicestershire.

Educated at Nottingham High School, Goodacre was 25 before he appeared in first-class cricket. In 1899, he hit three scores of more than 50 in nine matches, and in 1900 he made an unbeaten century against Yorkshire at Scarborough in 135 minutes, and an innings of 67 against Derbyshire when he added 73 in 65 minutes with James Iremonger after five wickets had fallen for 41 runs. He played in 19 further first-class matches over the next three seasons but failed to reach 50 in any innings.
