= Indian Tower =

Coordinates: 40.747350°N 75.323233°W

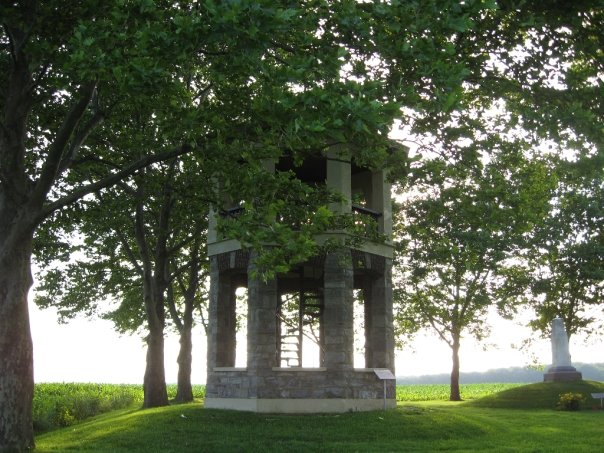
The Indian Tower

The Indian Tower is a lookout tower that sits at the highest point of the original 5,000 acres (20 km^{2}) of Nazareth, Pennsylvania.

The original structure was a pavilion called "the summer house" built in 1867 by John Jordan, Jr. Jordan later donated $200 to the Moravian Historical Society to replace the pavilion with the present-day tower, which was completed in 1916. The Indian Tower is commonly thought to have been a lookout for hostile Native Americans. In actuality, the local Native Americans had assimilated in Pennsylvania, and the tower received its name from the Moravian Graveyard it overlooks, which contains some Indian burials. The Moravian Graveyard was in use from 1744 to 1762. However, out of the 67 people buried there, only four were Native Americans. The original Indians would have been from the nearby village of Welagamika. The height of the tower is 30 feet. The tower has been used for many purposes: as a civil defense lookout during World War II, as a repeater station for emergency services, and also as a place to rest and reflect.
