= Nazareth, Pennsylvania =

Borough in Pennsylvania, US

Nazareth
- Borough
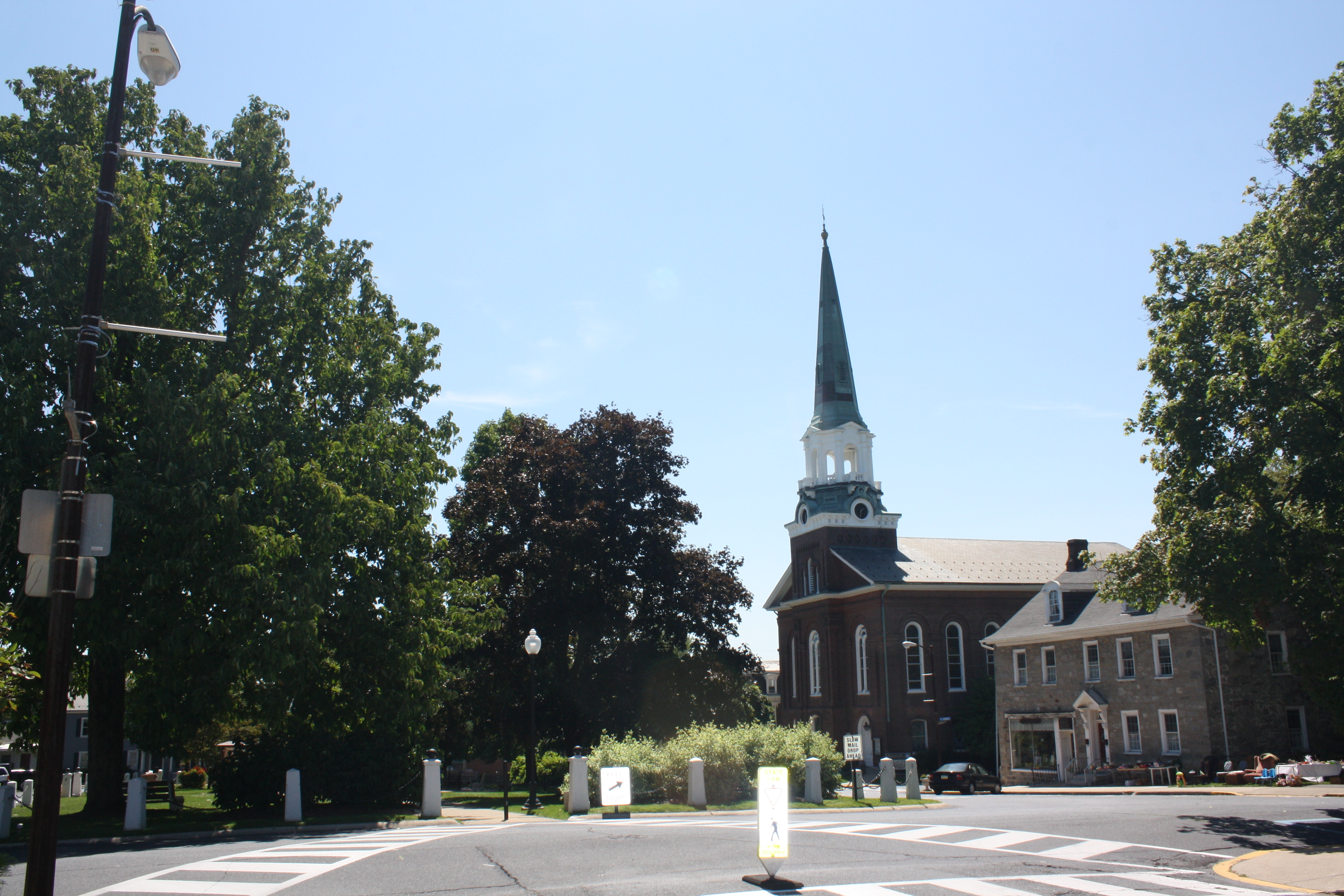
- Center Square in Nazareth in August 2013

- Logo

- Location of Nazareth in Northampton County, Pennsylvania (left) and of Northampton County in Pennsylvania (right)

- Location of Nazareth in Pennsylvania Nazareth (the United States)
- Coordinates: 40°44′24″N 75°18′40″W
- Country: United States
- State: Pennsylvania
- County: Northampton
- Founded: 1740

Government
  - Mayor: Lance Colondo

Area
  - Borough: 1.67 sq mi (4.32 km^{2})
  - Land: 1.59 sq mi (4.11 km^{2})
  - Water: 0.085 sq mi (0.22 km^{2})
- Elevation: 492 ft (150 m)

Population (2020)
  - Borough: 6,053
  - Density: 3,818.3/sq mi (1,474.26/km^{2})
  - Metro: 865,310 (US: 68th)
- Time zone: UTC-5 (EST)
  - Summer (DST): UTC-4 (EDT)
- ZIP Code: 18064
- Area codes: 610 and 484
- FIPS code: 42-52808
- Primary airport: Lehigh Valley International Airport
- Major hospital: Lehigh Valley Hospital–Cedar Crest
- School district: Nazareth Area
- Website: www.nazarethboroughpa.com

Nazareth is a borough in Northampton County, Pennsylvania, United States. The borough's population was 6,053 at the 2020 census. Nazareth is part of the Lehigh Valley metropolitan area, which had a population of 861,899 and was the 68th-most populous metropolitan area in the U.S. as of 2020.

== History ==
=== Etymology ===
The borough is named for the Biblical town of Nazareth, where Jesus spent his youth. The names of a number of other places in the Lehigh Valley area of Pennsylvania are similarly inspired, including Bethlehem, Emmaus, Egypt, and Allentown's Jordan Creek.

=== 18th and 19th centuries ===
Nazareth was founded in 1740 by ethnically German Moravian immigrants, who came from Georgia as "working guests" of Methodist evangelist and British cleric George Whitefield.

A "doctrinal dispute" led to Whitefield insisting the Moravians leave his land. In February 1741, Nathaniel Irish, a miller at Saucon Creek, sold five-hundred acres to the Moravians on the banks of the Monocacy River, which the Moravians moved to by June of that year.

When Whitefield's business manager died, Whitefield discovered that his finances were in such a poor state that he could not retain ownership of the Nazareth estate, and he was forced to sell the whole tract. On July 16, 1741, it officially became Moravian property.

Nazareth was originally planned as a central English-speaking church village, but in October 1742 its 18 English inhabitants departed for Philadelphia. They left Nazareth largely in the hands of Captain John, a Lenape chieftain, and his followers, who refused to leave. In December 1742, Count Nicolaus Zinzendorf, the Moravian benefactor and organizer, negotiated a settlement with Captain John, and his tribe moved back into the hinterland.

In 1743, the still-unfinished Whitefield House was put in readiness for 32 young married couples who were to arrive from Europe. On January 2, 1744, the couples went overland to Nazareth to settle in the nearly completed Whitefield House. Whitefield House and adjacent Gray Cottage now belong to the Moravian Historical Society.

In 1759, Nazareth Hall became the central boarding school for sons of Moravian parents. It later attained wide fame as a "classical academy", which led to the founding, in 1807, of Moravian College and Theological Seminary, now located in Bethlehem. Nazareth Hall Tract was added to the National Register of Historic Places in 1980.

Nazareth had been an exclusively Monrovian community, but by an 1820 meeting of the "Overseers Committee," the Moravians has become more liberal and allowed the admission of non-Moravians to live in the village. Christian minorities, at the time, included Evangelicals, Lutherans, and the Reformed Church.

On March 28, 1856, the Overseers' Committee of the Moravian Church gave up its governing powers, and Nazareth was able to form a popular government. The Borough of Nazareth became an official "functional municipal corporation" on November 27, 1858.

=== 20th and 21st centuries ===
Up until the mid-1900s, a large part of Nazareth's population was Pennsylvania Dutch. The Pennsylvania Dutch were spread throughout many counties of southern and central Pennsylvania. Many Pennsylvania Dutch came from Switzerland and Alsace in addition to what would become modern Germany.

Nazareth residents' religion reflected a largely German background in evangelical churches of fairly large sizes for such a small town, divided among the Moravian, Lutheran, German Reformed (now part of the United Church of Christ), and Roman Catholic worship centers of the town. The town also hosted a sizable Italian and Polish population, which largely attended Holy Family Catholic Church.

Amidst extensive migration to eastern Pennsylvania counties from New Jersey and New York in the late 20th century, the population expanded significantly. Developers from New Jersey were responding to tighter controls and regulations on new construction in the state of New Jersey by moving their enterprises to Pennsylvania. This new expansion and housing boom was enabled by the local completion of the Interstate Highway System, first begun by former U.S. President Dwight Eisenhower in the 1950s. In the Nazareth area, this was caused by the completion of the nearby Pennsylvania Route 33, which ran north and south, thereby connecting Interstate 78, U.S. Route 22, and Interstate 80, all of which ran east–west, and the completion of the Interstate 78 southern Lehigh Valley corridor high speed interstate, which connected the Lehigh Valley to New Jersey and New York City to the east and Harrisburg and Pittsburgh to the west.

The Nazareth Historic District was added to the National Register of Historic Places in 1988.

== Demographics ==
Historical population
Census	Pop.	Note	%±
1860	781		—
1870	949		21.5%
1880	984		3.7%
1890	1,318		33.9%
1900	2,304		74.8%
1910	3,978		72.7%
1920	4,288		7.8%
1930	5,505		28.4%
1940	5,721		3.9%
1950	5,830		1.9%
1960	6,209		6.5%
1970	5,815		−6.3%
1980	5,443		−6.4%
1990	5,713		5.0%
2000	6,023		5.4%
2010	5,746		−4.6%
2020	6,053		5.3%

As of the census of 2000, there were 6,023 people, 2,560 households, and 1,515 families residing in the borough. The population density was 3,603.8 inhabitants per square mile (1,391.4/km^{2}). There were 2,658 housing units at an average density of 1,590.4 per square mile (614.1/km^{2}). The racial makeup of the borough was 98.46% White, 0.55% African American, 0.08% Native American, 0.40% Asian, 0.28% from other races, and 0.23% from two or more races. Hispanic or Latino of any race were 0.95% of the population.

There were 2,560 households, out of which 25.1% had children under the age of 18 living with them, 47.1% were married couples living together, 8.9% had a female householder with no husband present, and 40.8% were non-families. 35.5% of all households were made up of individuals, and 19.3% had someone living alone who was 65 years of age or older. The average household size was 2.22 and the average family size was 2.89. Nazareth's population is spread out, with 20.2% under the age of 18, 6.7% from 18 to 24, 28.7% from 25 to 44, 20.0% from 45 to 64, and 24.4% who were 65 years of age or older. The median age was 41 years. For every 100 females there were 85.3 males. For every 100 females age 18 and over, there were 80.7 males.

As of the 2000 census, the median income for a household in the borough was $39,038, and the median income for a family was $50,298. Males had a median income of $35,642 versus $24,900 for females. The per capita income for the borough was $21,292. About 4.2% of families and 8.0% of the population were below the poverty line, including 9.3% of those under age 18 and 11.4% of those age 65 or over. In 1900, 2,304 people lived there, and in 1910, 3,978 inhabitants existed; 5,721 people lived in Nazareth in 1940. Its population was 6,023 at the 2000 census.

== Geography ==
Nazareth is located at 40°44′24″N 75°18′40″W (40.739993, -75.311214). According to the U.S. Census Bureau, the borough has a total area of 1.7 square miles (4.4 km^{2}), all land.

Nazareth's climate is similar to the rest of the Lehigh Valley with four distinct seasons, humid summers, cold winters, and very short and mild springs and falls. This climate is hot-summer humid continental (Dfa) and average monthly temperatures range from 28.1 °F (−2.2 °C) in January to 73.4 °F (23.0 °C) in July. The hardiness zone is 6b. Nazareth's topography can best be described as hilly, as the town itself sits atop a local outcropping underground of one of the richest veins of limestone in the U.S. Much of the farmland surrounding Nazareth is being converted into close sitting lots of suburban housing, for predominantly commuter households.

== Transportation ==
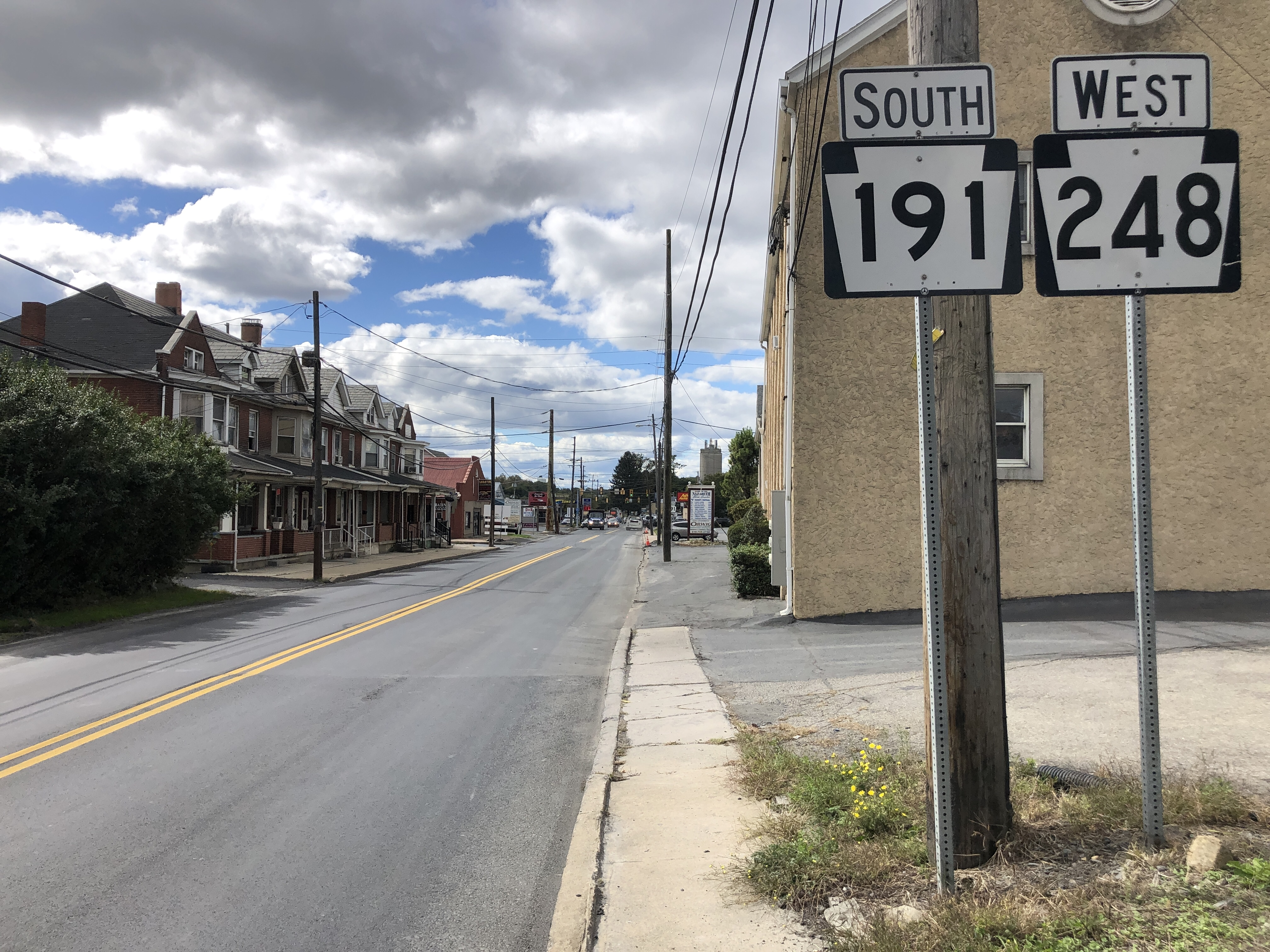
PA Route 191 South and PA Route 248 West in Nazareth

As of 2016, there were 22.48 miles (36.18 km) of public roads in Nazareth, of which 5.24 miles (8.43 km) were maintained by the Pennsylvania Department of Transportation (PennDOT) and 17.24 miles (27.75 km) were maintained by the borough.

Pennsylvania Route 191 and Pennsylvania Route 248 are the numbered highways serving Nazareth. PA 248 follows Easton Road along an east-west alignment across the southern edge of the borough. PA 191 follows a southwest-northeast alignment via Easton Road, Broad Street, Center Street and New Street, including a short concurrency with PA 248.

== Education ==
Nazareth Borough is served by the Nazareth Area School District, which also comprises the surrounding townships of Bushkill, Upper Nazareth, and Lower Nazareth, and the boroughs of Tatamy and Stockertown. Students in grades nine through 12 attend Nazareth Area High School. Students in grades seven through eight attend Nazareth Area Middle School.

The district's schools include:

- Lower Nazareth Elementary
- Floyd R. Shafer Elementary
- Kenneth N. Butz Jr Elementary
- Nazareth Area Intermediate School
- Nazareth Area Middle School
- Nazareth Area High School

== Media ==
News about the Nazareth community is reported regularly in regional newspapers The Morning Call and The Express-Times daily newspapers and local shoppers, including The Nazareth Times, The Home News, and The Key.

== Nazareth Speedway ==
Nazareth was home to the Nazareth Speedway, a one-mile tri-oval automobile racing course. The track opened in 1910 and closed in 2004; the site has remained vacant ever since. Nazareth is also home to racing champions Mario Andretti and Michael Andretti, and third-generation driver Marco Andretti.

== Industry ==
Nazareth is home to a mix of historic and modern businesses that shape its small-town economy and identity. The borough home to the headquarters and factory of C. F. Martin & Company, the world-renowned guitar maker, which has operated in Nazareth since relocating from New York City in 1839.

Another long-standing business is Kraemer Textiles, a mill established in 1887 that still produces yarns for both industrial use and hand-knitting, including supplying Merino wool for U.S. Olympic team sweaters. Alongside these heritage manufacturers, Nazareth supports a number of local retailers, restaurants, and service businesses. There is also a Chevy dealership in the area.

=== Kraemer Textiles Inc. ===
Kraemer Textiles Inc., which started out as a silk hosiery maker in 1887, is based in Nazareth. Over the years, the company changed to spinning yarns out of manmade and natural fibers for clients to use in the manufacture of upholstery, clothing, and home furnishings. The company creates and markets its own brand of handicraft yarns under the Kraemer Yarns label. The company also spun the Merino wool yarn that was used in creating the end-to-end American-made sweaters produced by the Ralph Lauren Corporation for the athletes of the 2014 Winter Olympics.

=== Martin Guitar ===
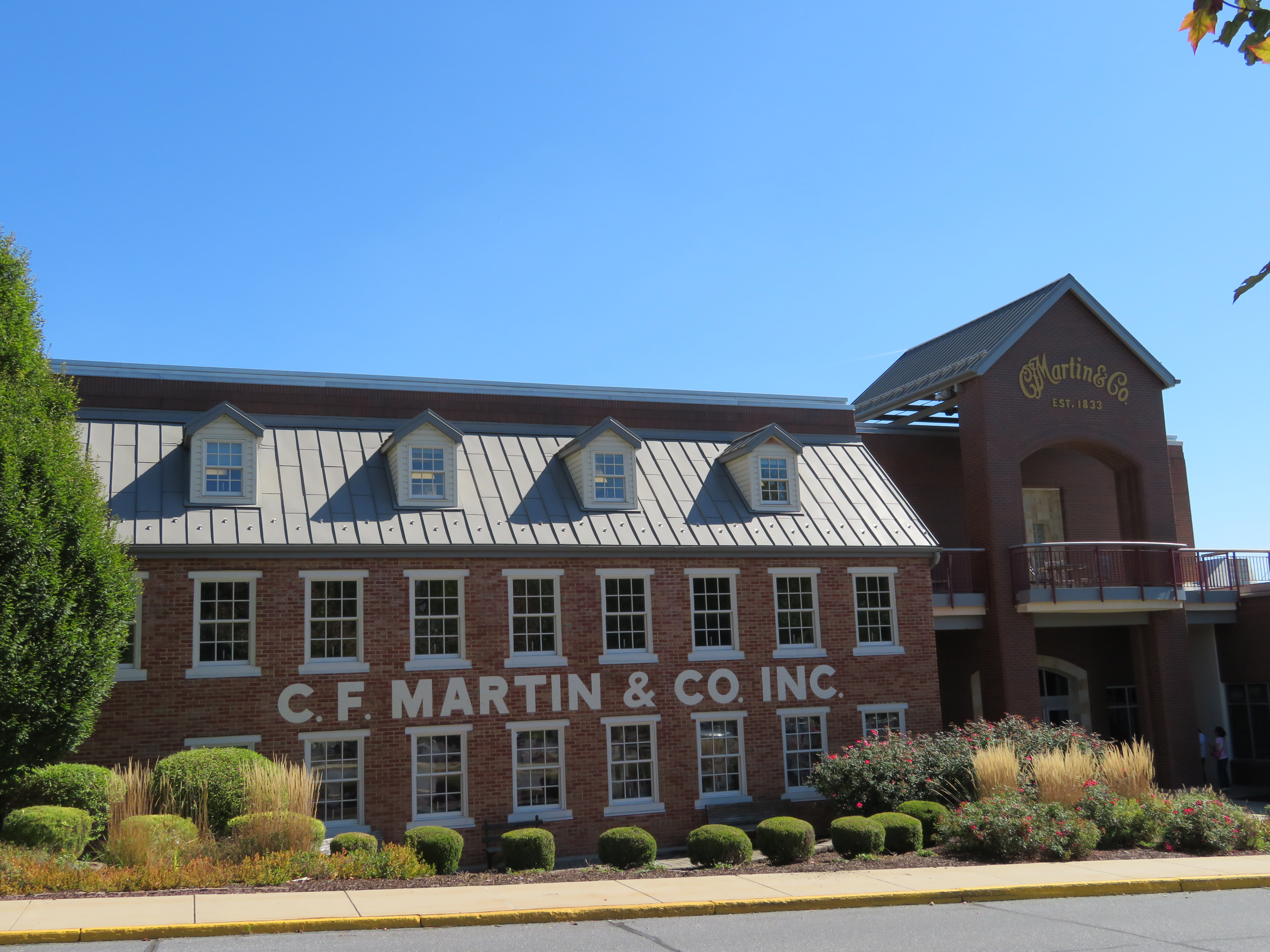
The headquarters and factory of C. F. Martin & Company in Nazareth.

Nazareth houses the global headquarters and main factory of C. F. Martin & Company, which manufactures acoustic guitars and ukuleles. Founded in New York City in 1833, it relocated to Nazareth in 1839. Martin guitars have been used by some of the world's most prominent guitarists, including Johnny Cash, Elvis Presley, Bob Dylan, Hank Williams, Neil Young, John Lennon, Willie Nelson, Kurt Cobain, Eric Clapton, and John Mayer.

=== Cement manufacturing ===
In the 1960s, at least three large cement companies surrounded the Nazareth borough area, Essroc (formally Coplay Cement), Hercules Cement, and Penn-Dixie Cement Companies. The Coplay plant on the south side has undergone company ownership changes through the years (and was also known as the Nazareth Cement Company, among other names). Hundreds of union laborers of the United Gypsum, Lime and Cement Unions worked in each plant around the town from the early 1900s.

Stories of the hard pre-union days at the cement plants are replete with the description of twelve-hour days for survival wages, poor working and health conditions, and many dangerous incidents and accidents causing loss of life and or limb without medical plans or benefits to survivors. Since the 1980s, however, the automation of the plants and eventual reselling of them to foreign firms has brought about the loss of most of the high-paying union cement jobs, presenting a blow to the Lehigh Valley economy. The impact on the local economy of these lost cement jobs was intensified by the closure of Bethlehem Steel in 2003. In the case of Bethlehem Steel, it was not automation and modernization that downsized the workforce, but failure to modernize the mills, overloaded management, and a laissez-faire management attitude about foreign competition and cheap foreign steel production.

== Notable people ==
- Marco Andretti, professional IndyCar Series race car driver
- Mario Andretti, 1967 Daytona 500 winner, 1969 Indy 500 winner, 1978 Formula One champion, 1984 IndyCar Series champion, and 29-time Indy 500 starter
- Michael Andretti, 1991 IndyCar Series champion, Formula One race car driver and IndyCar Series team owner
- Jahan Dotson (born 2000), professional football wide receiver for the Philadelphia Eagles
- Sage Karam, professional NASCAR Xfinity Series race car driver
- Joe Kovacs, track and field athlete, Olympic silver medalist, world champion in shot put
- Christian Frederick Martin, luthier and founder of C. F. Martin & Company
- Kate Micucci, actress, comedian, artist, and singer-songwriter
- Jordan White, rock musician

== In literature and popular culture ==
- Lydia Sigourney's poem "Funeral at Nazareth" is accompanied by text in relation to the Moravian settlements both there and in Bethlehem.
- The 1968 song "The Weight" by the Band concerns a traveler who arrives in Nazareth and the people he encounters there, including the Devil. Songwriter Robbie Robertson included Nazareth in the song after seeing its name printed on his Martin guitar. The Scottish rock band Nazareth later took their name from the song.
- Mark Knopfler wrote a 2000 song about a season of racing at Nazareth Speedway titled "Speedway At Nazareth." The song appears on Knopfler's second solo album, Sailing to Philadelphia.

== See also ==
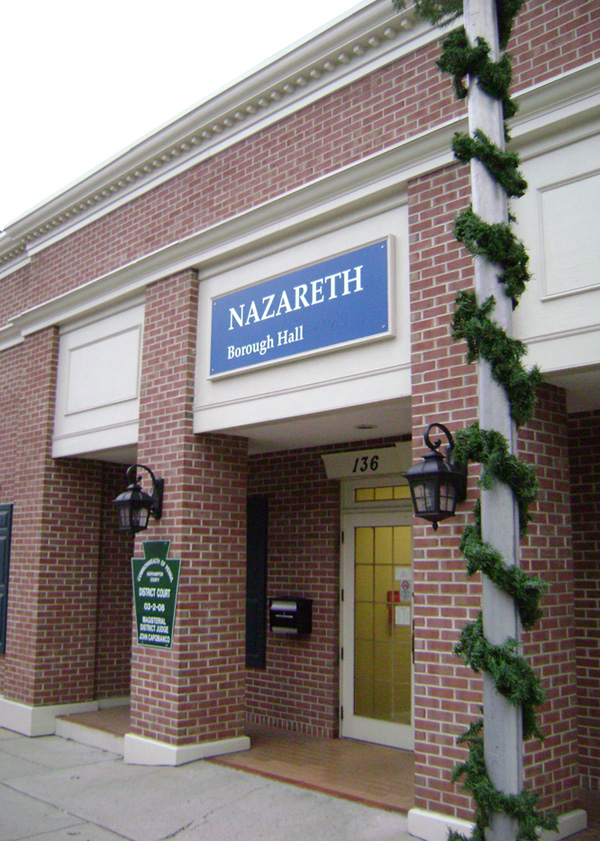
Nazareth Borough Hall

- Indian Tower
- Memorial Library of Nazareth & Vicinity
