= Nazareth Area High School =

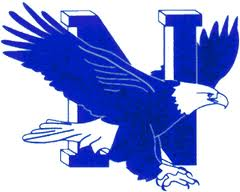

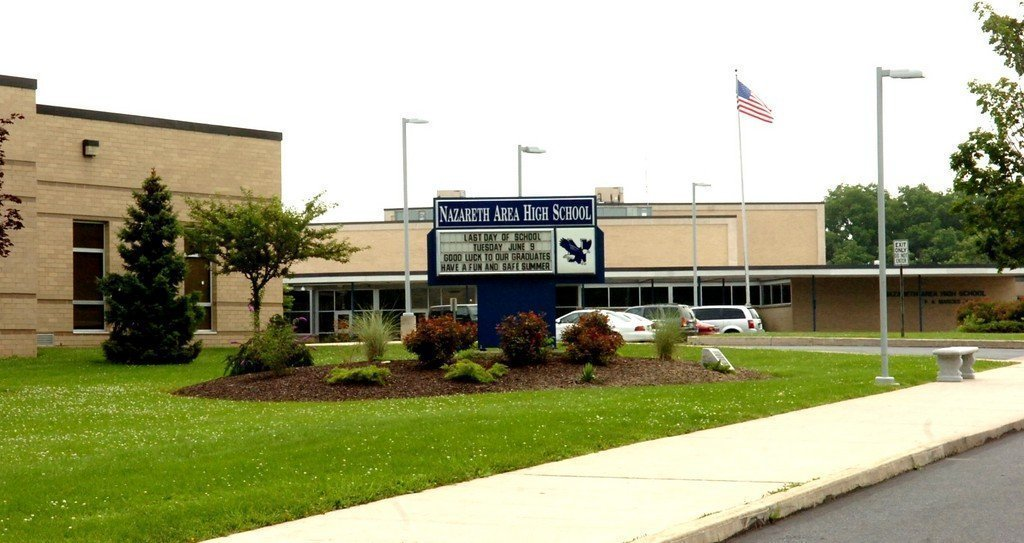
- Nazareth Area High School in April 2013

Location
- 501 East Center Street; Nazareth, Pennsylvania 18064; United States; 40°44′33″N 75°17′54″W

Information
- Type: Public high school
- Established: October 3, 1955
- School district: Nazareth Area School District
- Superintendent: Isabel C. Resende
- NCES School ID: 421638003495
- Principal: Scott Breidinger
- Teaching staff: 102.57 (on an FTE basis)
- Grades: 9th–12th
- Enrollment: 1,607 (2024–2025)
- Student to teacher ratio: 15.67
- Campus type: Suburb: Large
- Colors: Blue, white, black
- Athletics conference: Eastern Pennsylvania Conference
- Mascot: Blue Eagle
- Nickname: Blue Eagles
- Newspaper: Blue and White Standard
- Website: www.nazarethasd.org/o/nahs

Nazareth Area High School is a public high school located in Nazareth, Pennsylvania in the Lehigh Valley region of eastern Pennsylvania. It is the only high school in the Nazareth Area School District and serves grades 9 through 12. Its mascot is the Blue Eagle and school colors are blue and white.

As of the 2024–25 school year, the school had an enrollment of 1,607 students and 102.57 classroom teachers (on an FTE basis) for a student–teacher ratio of 15.67, according to National Center for Education Statistics data. There were 226 students eligible for free lunch and 25 eligible for reduced-cost lunch.

During the 2009–2010 school year, the high school obtained full accreditation by the Middle States Association of Colleges and Schools. In 2012, Nazareth Area High School received the Keystone Award from the Pennsylvania Department of Education for achieving annual progress for two consecutive years as measured by the Pennsylvania System of School Assessment (PSSA) tests.

Nazareth Area High School has also appeared on the College Boards Advanced Placement Honor Roll for four consecutive years. Nazareth Area High School has an AP test passing rate of 87%, above state average of 69% and global average of 61%.

== History ==
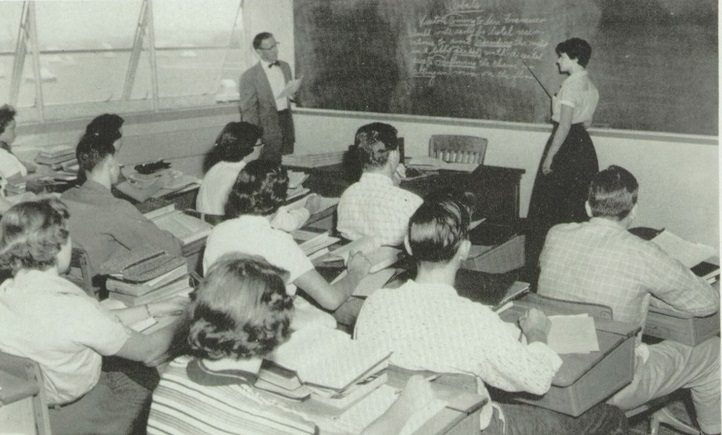
Students at Nazareth Area High School in Nazareth, in 1955

The current high school was first built in 1954 and opened to students on October 3, 1955. It was dedicated on April 8, 1956, to Frederic A. Marcks, a former teacher and the first Superintendent of the Nazareth Area School District, following the merger of the regional districts. The original construction of the building consisted of two floors of academic classrooms with an auditorium, a gym, and a large cafeteria.

In 1971, the school underwent construction of a new wing consisting mainly of classrooms which made the school twice as large as it was originally intended to be. In addition to new classrooms, the addition included of the Sharon L. Adams Library and Media Center, expanded the cafeteria to nearly four times its original size, and added onto the current gym, doubling the size while also adding a lower level which housed a fitness room and coach's offices.

In 1998, the school experienced a mold problem which destroyed most of the old ceilings in the original building while causing the lead paint in the 1971 addition to chip faster than expected. The problem was deemed a health issue, and the school was forced to close for emergency renovations. That same year, with the new middle school built, the old junior high school, constructed in 1983, became the school's "North Campus."

In 1999, the new auditorium and music wing were constructed. The new auditorium was twice the size of the old auditorium and housed a complete light and sound power station with two floors of stage equipment storage. The music wing contains an instrument storage facility, practice rooms, offices, and classrooms that can hold in excess of 200 students at a time.

== Extracurricular activities ==
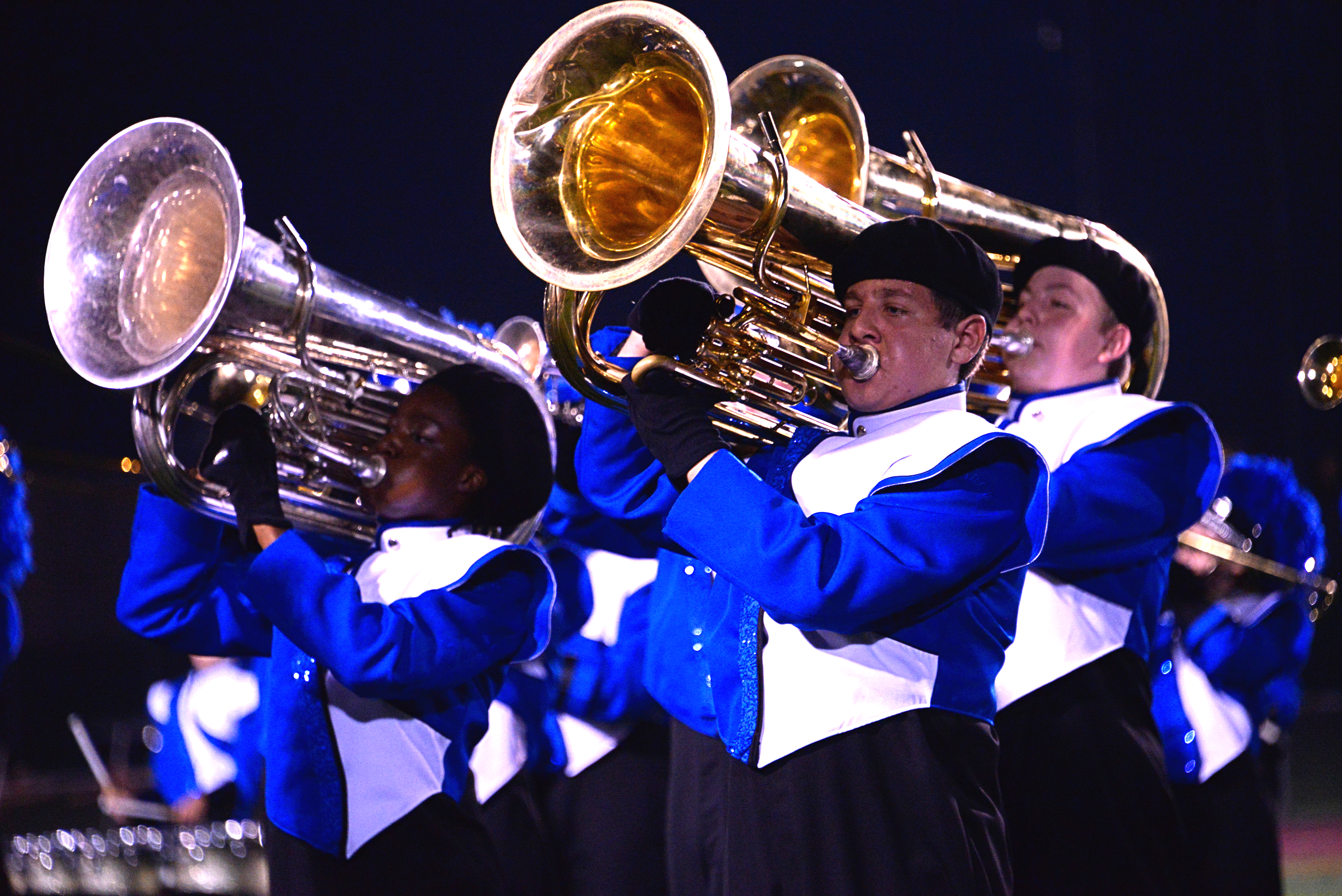
The tuba section of Nazareth Area High School's marching band in November 2018

=== Athletics ===
Nazareth Area High School competes athletically in the Eastern Pennsylvania Conference (EPC) in the District XI division of the Pennsylvania Interscholastic Athletic Association, one of the premier high school athletic divisions in the nation. Nazareth's main Eastern Pennsylvania Conference athletic rivals are Northampton High School, Parkland High School, Freedom High School, and Easton High School.

Nazareth is one of eleven Lehigh Valley-area high schools with an ice hockey team; the team is a member of the Lehigh Valley Scholastic Ice Hockey League.

=== Arts ===
- Choral Programs
- General Art
- Guitar & Piano
- Nazareth Area Blue Eagle Marching Band
- Nazareth Area Theatre Troupe

=== Blue Eagle Marching Band ===
The Nazareth Area Blue Eagle Marching Band is one of many arts programs in the Nazareth Area High School. The band has been performing field shows since 1980 and has competed in a number of different competitive circuits, including U.S. Bands and Cavalcade of Bands. The band has won multiple national championships. Their most recent accomplishment includes winning the Cavalcade of Bands Yankee open-class championships in November 2024 at Dallastown Area High School.

- 2008 USSBA Group 4 Open (Northern States Championship) – 1st Place
- 2008 USSBA National Championship (Group 4 Open and Grand National Champion)
- 2010 USSBA Group 4 Open Championship (Northern States) – 1st Place
- 2010 USSBA Group 4 National Championship – 1st Place
- 2012 USBands Group 4 Pennsylvania State Championship – 1st Place
- 2013 USBands Group 4 Pennsylvania State Championship - 1st Place
- 2013 USBands Group 4 Mid-Atlantic States Championship - 1st Place
- 2014 USBands Group 4 National Championship – 1st Place.
- 2015 USBands Group 4 Pennsylvania State Championship – 1st Place
- 2019 Cavalcade of Bands Patriot Open - 1st Place - High Visual - High Music
- 2021 Cavalcade of Bands Yankee Open - 1st place - High Visual - High Music - High Overall Effect
- 2022 Cavalcade of Bands Patriot Open - 1st Place - High Visual - High Music - High Overall Effect - High Percussion
- 2023 Cavalcade of Bands Yankee Open - 1st Place - High Visual - High Music - High Overall Effect - High Percussion - High Auxiliary
- 2024 Cavalcade of Bands Yankee Open - 1st Place - High Visual - High Music - High Overall Effect - High Percussion

=== Eagle Nest Gallery ===
The Eagle Nest Gallery, located in the high school, is a professional gallery which hosts artists from the community in monthly shows. The gallery can show both two-dimensional and three-dimensional pieces. Each month a gallery reception is held, where the public can meet and talk with the artists.

== Notable alumni ==
- Jeff Andretti, former professional racing driver
- Michael Andretti, former racing driver and former racing team owner, Andretti Global
- Jahan Dotson, football player, Philadelphia Eagles
- Sage Karam, professional racing driver
- Milou Mackenzie, Pennsylvania state representative
- Kate Micucci, actress, comedian, artist, and singer-songwriter
- John Strohmeyer, Pulitzer Prize-winning journalist
- Jordan White, rock musician
- Glennys Young, historian and history department chairman, University of Washington
