= Allegory of Chastity =

Painting by Lorenzo Lotto, c. 1505

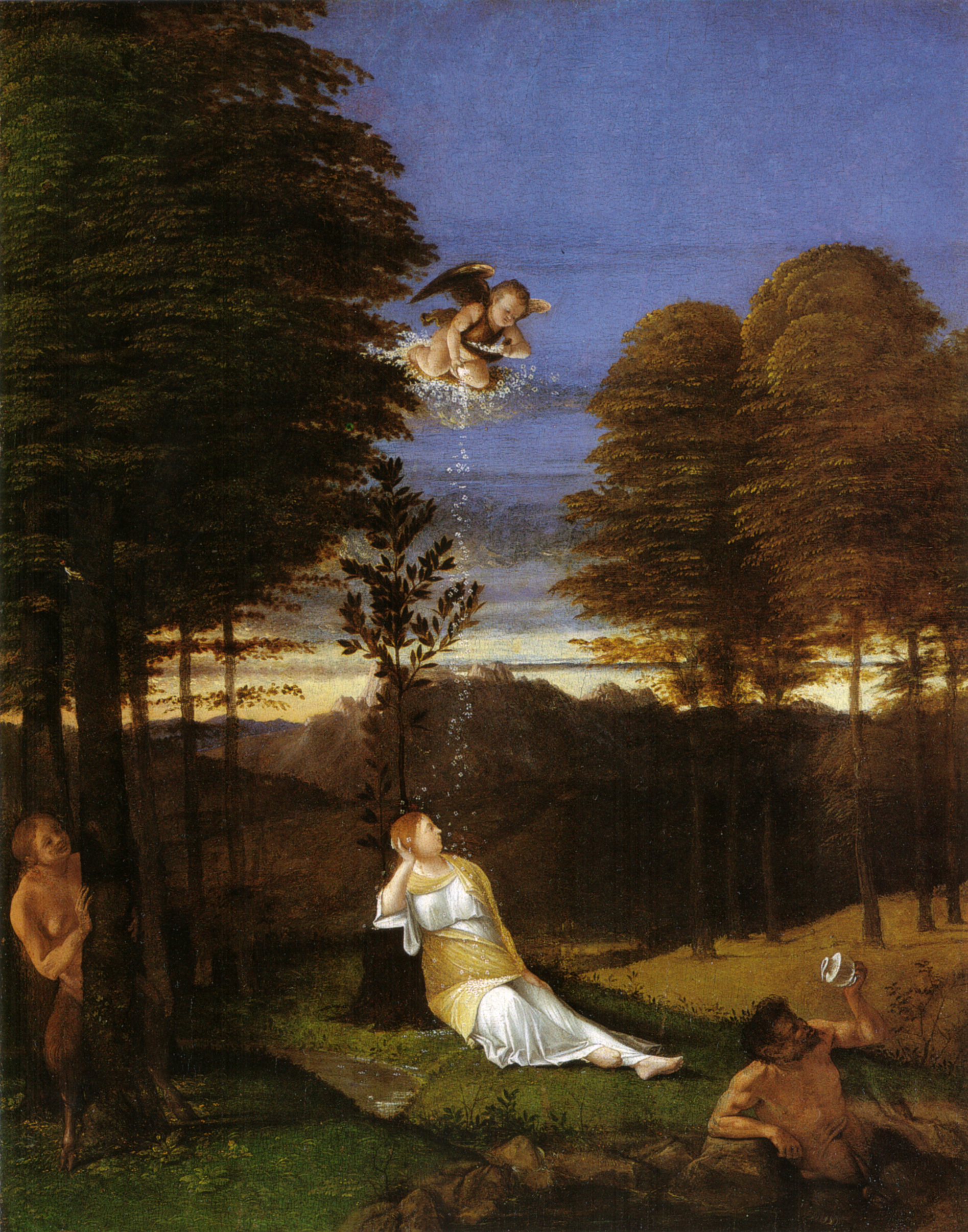
- Year: c. 1505
- Medium: oil paint
- Dimensions: 42.9 cm (16.9 in) × 33.7 cm (13.3 in)
- Location: National Gallery of Art
- Collection: Samuel H. Kress Collection

Allegory of Chastity is a c.1505 oil-on-panel painting by the Italian Renaissance artist Lorenzo Lotto.

== History ==
It was first recorded in the 19th century, when it was in the Castelbarco collection in Milan. It was then sold to Sir William Martin Conway in 1887 and moved to his home at Allington Castle in Kent. Its next owner was Alessandro Contini-Bonacossi, who on 4 October 1934 sold it to Samuel H. Kress, who took it to the USA and gave it to the National Gallery of Art in 1939, where it still hangs.

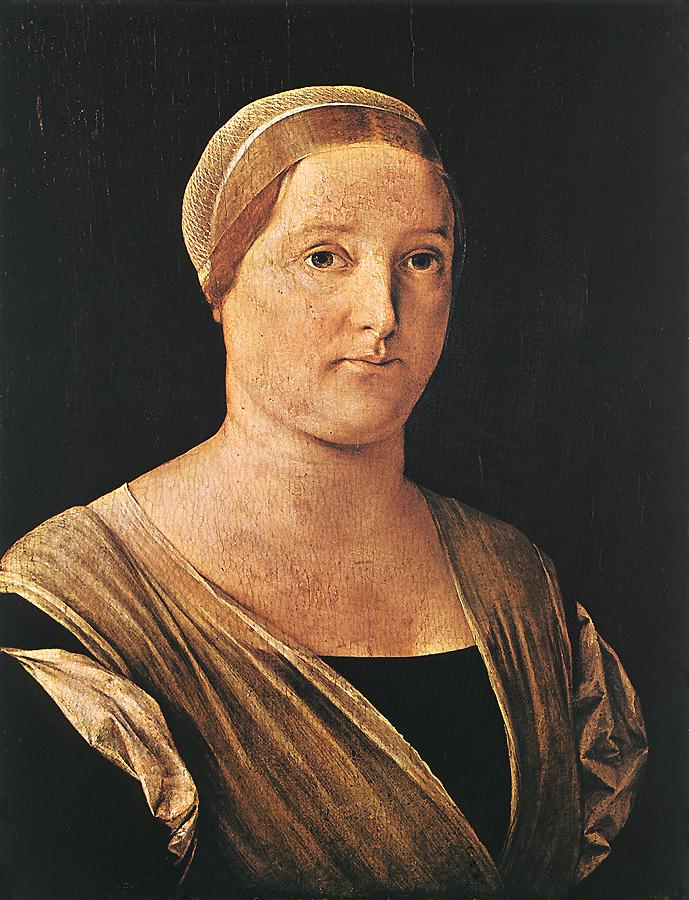
Portrait of a Woman

Its dating is based on stylistic similarities to Lotto's Allegory of Virtue and Vice, a cover Lotto had produced for his own Portrait of Bernardo de' Rossi. It was probably a cover itself, possibly for Portrait of a Woman (Musée des Beaux-Arts de Dijon). Lotto was then a young protege of de' Rossi, who had gathered a small circle of writers and artists around him. Radiography has shown a partial under-drawing for a different image, probably a Hercules at the Crossroads, another theme on the choice between vice and virtue.

== Description ==
The background landscape recalls Dürer's watercolours and Giorgione's landscape paintings. A young woman in white and gold leans against a laurel tree in the centre, possibly referring to Daphne, and ignores two satyrs (one female, one male), symbolising intoxication and lust. A putto pours a cascade of white flowers over her.

== Bibliography ==
- Carlo Pirovano, Lotto, Milano 2002, Electa, ISBN 88-435-7550-3.
- Roberta D'Adda, Lotto, Milano, Skira, 2004.
