= Washington Township, Lehigh County, Pennsylvania =

Township in Pennsylvania, US

Washington Township
- Township
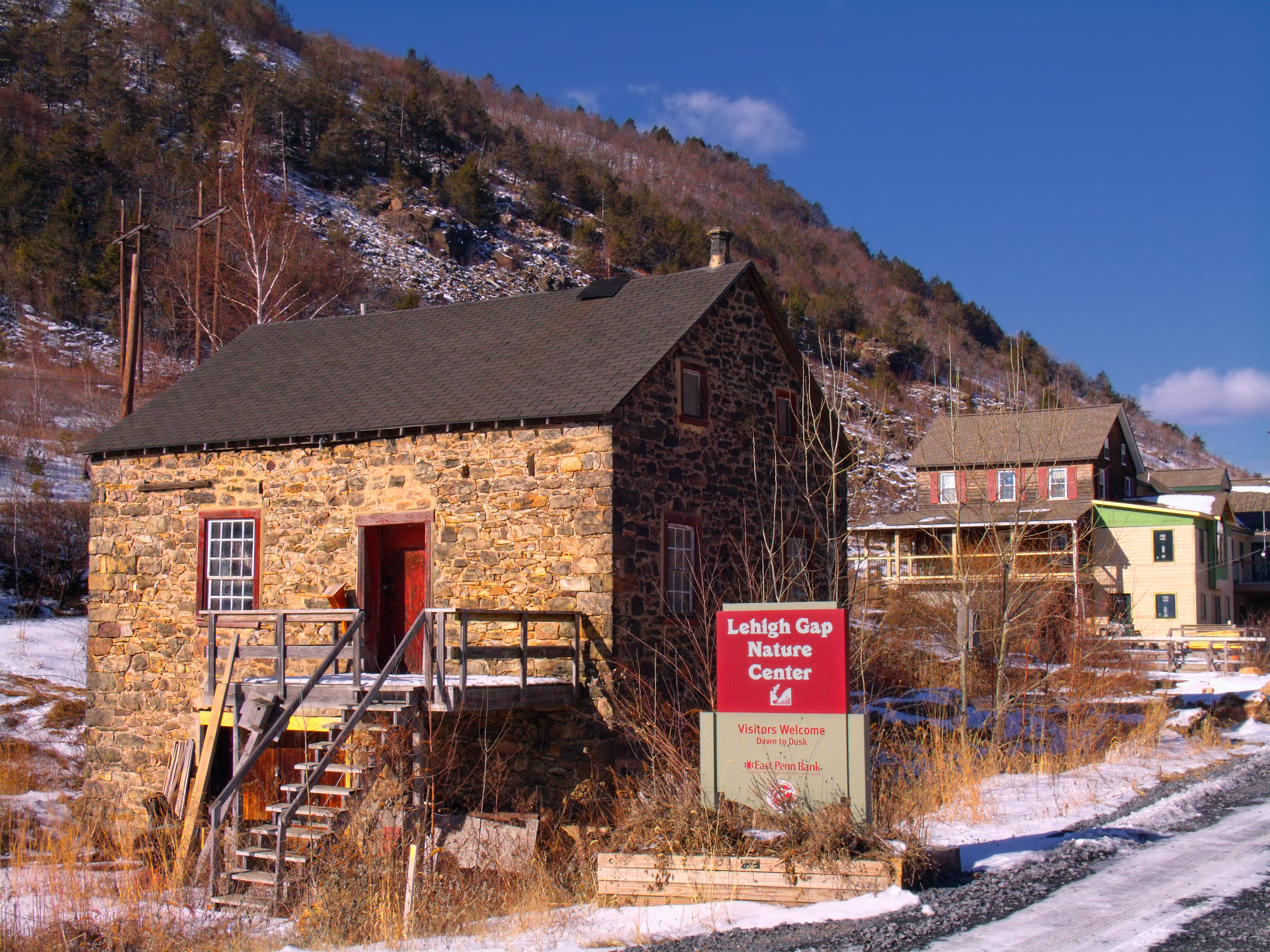
- Lehigh Gap Nature Center in Washington Township in 2011

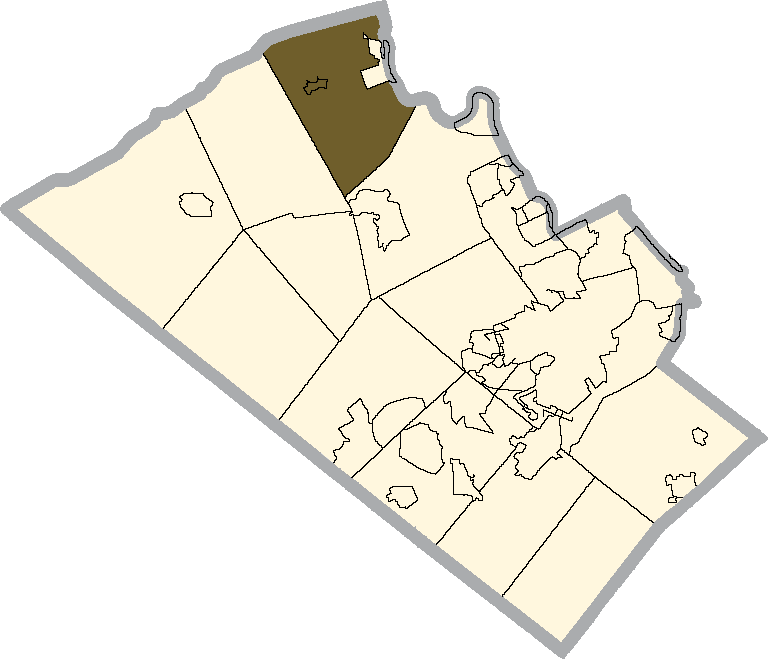
- Location of Washington Township in Lehigh County, Pennsylvania

- Location of Washington Township in Pennsylvania Location in the United States
- Coordinates: 40°44′59″N 75°37′30″W
- Country: United States
- State: Pennsylvania
- County: Lehigh

Area
  - Township: 23.74 sq mi (61.48 km^{2})
  - Land: 23.56 sq mi (61.01 km^{2})
  - Water: 0.19 sq mi (0.48 km^{2})
- Elevation: 518 ft (158 m)

Population (2010)
  - Township: 6,624
  - Estimate (2016): 6,761
  - Density: 287.0/sq mi (110.83/km^{2})
  - Metro: 865,310 (US: 68th)
- Time zone: UTC-5 (EST)
  - Summer (DST): UTC-4 (EDT)
- ZIP codes: 18065, 18078, 18079, 18080
- Area code: 610
- FIPS code: 42-077-81280
- Primary airport: Lehigh Valley International Airport
- Major hospital: Lehigh Valley Hospital–Cedar Crest
- School district: Northern Lehigh
- Website: www.washingtonlehigh.org

Washington Township is a township in Lehigh County, Pennsylvania, United States. The population of Washington Township was 6,624 at the 2010 census. It is a suburb of Allentown in the Lehigh Valley, which had a population of 861,899 and was the 68th-most populous metropolitan area in the U.S. as of the 2020 census.

== History ==
Vigilant Fire Company Firemen's Monument, erected in 1909 in Washington Township, was added to the National Register of Historic Places in 2004.

== Geography ==
Washington Township is the northernmost in Lehigh County. According to the U.S. Census Bureau, the township has a total area of 23.7 square miles (61.5 km^{2}), of which 23.6 square miles (61.0 km^{2}) are land and 0.2 square miles (0.5 km^{2}), or 0.74%, are water. It is drained by the Lehigh River, which separates it from Northampton County to the east, and Blue Mountain separates it from Carbon County to the north.

The township includes nine villages: Best Station, Emerald, Friedens, Lehigh Furnace, Lehigh Gap, Neffs, Newhard, Newside, and Slatedale.

=== Adjacent municipalities ===
- North Whitehall Township (south)
- Heidelberg Township (west)
- East Penn Township, Carbon County (north)
- Lower Towamensing Township (tangent to the northeast)
- Lehigh Township (east)
- Slatington (east)
- Walnutport (east)

=== Climate ===
The township has a humid continental climate (Dfa/Dfb) and the hardiness zones are 6a and 6b. Average monthly temperatures range from 27.9 °F (−2.3 °C) in January to 72.3 °F (22.4 °C) in July.

== Demographics ==
Historical population
Census	Pop.	Note	%±
2000	6,588		—
2010	6,624		0.5%
2016 (est.)	6,761		2.1%
U.S. Decennial Census

As of the census of 2000, there were 6,588 people, 2,512 households, and 1,929 families residing in the township. The population density was 278.4 inhabitants per square mile (107.5/km^{2}). There were 2,594 housing units at an average density of 109.6 per square mile (42.3/km^{2}). The racial makeup of the township was 98.71% White, 0.21% African American, 0.08% Native American, 0.41% Asian, 0.24% from other races, and 0.35% from two or more races. Hispanic or Latino of any race were 0.97% of the population.

There were 2,512 households, out of which 32.0% had children under the age of 18 living with them, 65.2% were married couples living together, 7.2% had a female householder with no husband present, and 23.2% were non-families. 18.0% of all households were made up of individuals, and 7.8% had someone living alone who was 65 years of age or older. The average household size was 2.62 and the average family size was 2.97.

In the township, the population was spread out, with 22.7% under the age of 18, 6.9% from 18 to 24, 31.4% from 25 to 44, 27.3% from 45 to 64, and 11.7% who were 65 years of age or older. The median age was 40 years. For every 100 females, there were 103.0 males. For every 100 females age 18 and over, there were 101.8 males. The median income for a household in the township was $50,587, and the median income for a family was $55,332. Males had a median income of $35,340 versus $26,967 for females. The per capita income for the township was $19,980. About 3.5% of families and 5.1% of the population were below the poverty line, including 3.0% of those under age 18 and 10.9% of those age 65 or over.

United States presidential election results for Washington Township, Lehigh County, Pennsylvania
Year	Republican		Democratic		Third party(ies)	
Year	No.	%	No.	%	No.	%
2024	2,682	67.73%	1,251	31.59%	27	0.68%
2020	2,583	67.21%	1,227	31.93%	33	0.86%
2016	2,181	67.86%	935	29.09%	98	3.05%
2012	1,658	58.18%	1,155	40.53%	37	1.30%
2008	1,574	51.49%	1,432	46.84%	51	1.67%
2004	1,647	56.31%	1,254	42.87%	24	0.82%

== Education ==
The township is served by the Northern Lehigh School District. Students in grades nine through 12 attend Northern Lehigh High School in Slatington.

== Transportation ==
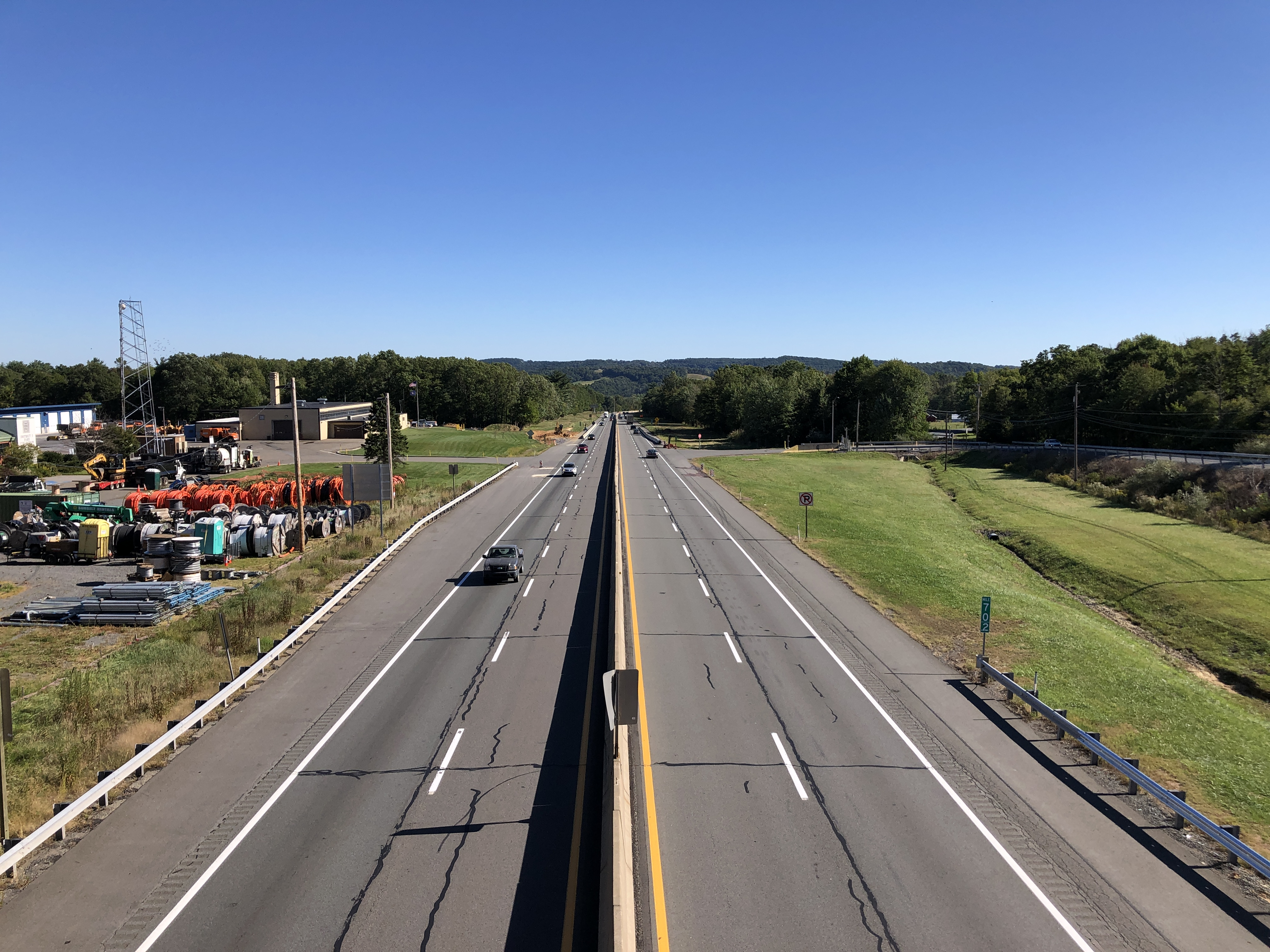
I-476, the Northeast Extension of the Pennsylvania Turnpike South in Washington Township

As of 2010, there were 88.07 miles (141.73 km) of public roads in Washington Township, of which 6.00 miles (9.66 km) were maintained by the Pennsylvania Turnpike Commission (PTC), 19.25 miles (30.98 km) were maintained by the Pennsylvania Department of Transportation (PennDOT) and 62.82 miles (101.10 km) were maintained by the township.

Interstate 476 follows the Pennsylvania Turnpike's Northeast Extension along a northwest–southeast alignment through Washington Township, entering the Lehigh Tunnel near the north edge of the township. However, the nearest interchange is in South Whitehall Township. Local access to the township is provided by Pennsylvania Route 873, which crosses north-to-south from Pennsylvania Route 248 in Lehigh Gap to PA Route 329 in Neffs and PA Route 309 in Schnecksville. An important east-to-west thoroughfare is Mountain Road, which proceeds west from PA 873 in Lehigh Gap to PA 309 north of New Tripoli. LANta serves the township with bus route 325.
