= Cherryville, Pennsylvania =

Unincorporated community in Pennsylvania, US

- Census-designated place
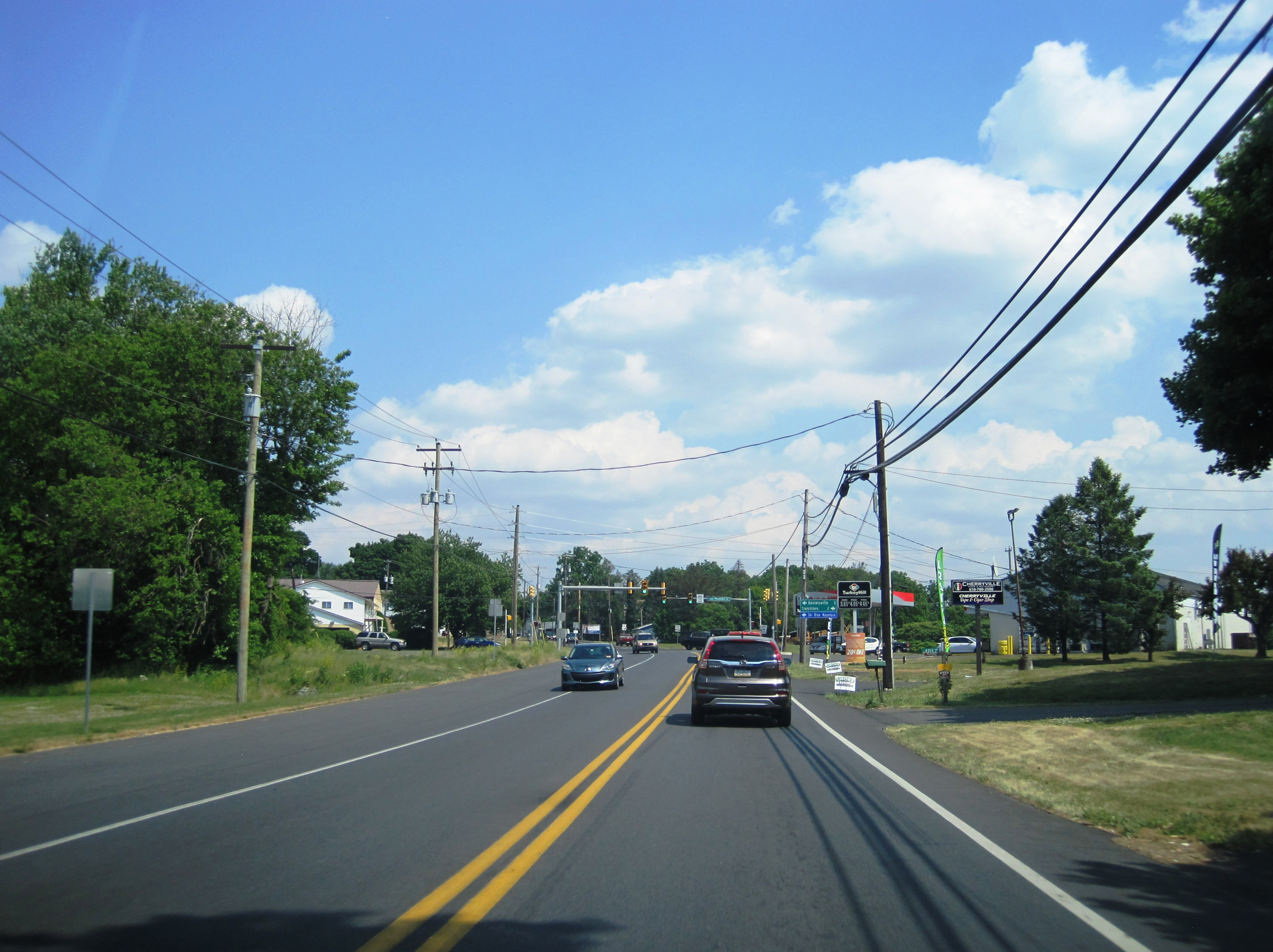
- Eastbound PA 248 in Cherryville

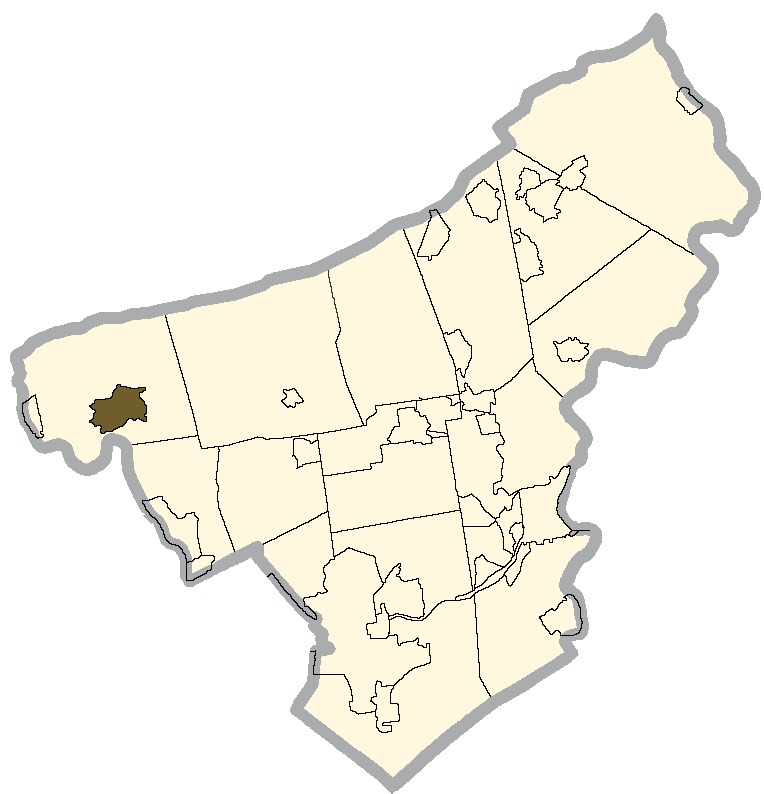
- Location of Cherryville in Northampton County, Pennsylvania

- Location of Cherryville in Pennsylvania Cherryville, Pennsylvania (the United States) Cherryville, Pennsylvania (the United States)
- Coordinates: 40°45′14″N 75°32′19″W
- Country: United States
- State: Pennsylvania
- County: Northampton
- Township: Lehigh

Area
  - Census-designated place: 2.63 sq mi (6.81 km^{2})
  - Land: 2.62 sq mi (6.79 km^{2})
  - Water: 0.0077 sq mi (0.02 km^{2})

Population (2020)
  - Census-designated place: 1,618
  - Density: 617.4/sq mi (238.38/km^{2})
  - Metro: 865,310 (US: 68th)
- Time zone: UTC-5 (Eastern (EST))
  - Summer (DST): UTC-4 (EDT)
- ZIP codes: 18035
- Area code: 610
- FIPS code: 42-13168

Cherryville is a census-designated place in Lehigh Township in Northampton County, Pennsylvania, United States. Its population was 1,618 as of the 2020 U.S. census.

The village is located approximately 3 miles (4.8 km) east of Walnutport, 12.5 miles (20.1 km) north of Allentown and 5.5 miles (8.9 km) northwest of Northampton. It is situated along Pennsylvania Route 248, between the villages of Indianland and Pennsville. The ZIP Code is 18035.

It is part of the Lehigh Valley metropolitan area, which had a population of 861,899 and was the 68th-most populous metropolitan area in the U.S. as of the 2020 census.

== History ==
Historical population
Census	Pop.	Note	%±
2020	1,618		—
U.S. Decennial Census

The village was founded around 1804, making it one of the township's earliest settlements. The name Cherryville is believed to have been taken from a road called Cherry Row Lane which was bordered by 100 cherry trees. A post office was established here in 1816. By the 1870s, the village included 25 houses, two carriage shops, two blacksmith shops, a wheel shop, a tailor, and four stores.

== Notable people ==
- Samuel Henry Kress, founder of S. H. Kress & Co. and art collector
