= Northern Lehigh School District =

School district in Pennsylvania, US

Coordinates: 40.76528°N 75.61436°W

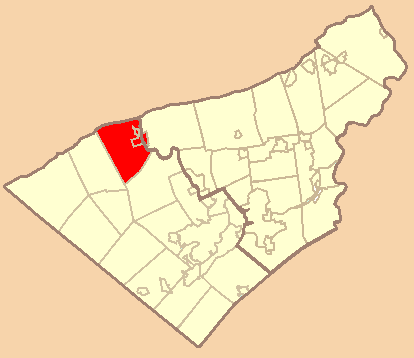
- Location of Northern Lehigh School District in Lehigh and Northampton Counties, Pennsylvania

Location
- 1201 Shadow Oaks Lane Slatington, Pennsylvania, 18080; United States

District information
- Type: Public
- Established: July 1, 1966
- Superintendent: Matthew Link
- Schools: Four, including Northern Lehigh High School
- Budget: $38.17 million
- NCES District ID: 4217670

Students and staff
- Enrollment: 1,597 (2023-24)
- Faculty: 113.16 (on an FTE basis)
- Student–teacher ratio: 14.11
- Athletic conference: Colonial League
- Colors: Navy and White

Other information
- Website: www.nlsd.org

Northern Lehigh School District is a school district primarily serving Lehigh County with a smaller portion serving Northampton County, both within the Lehigh Valley region of eastern Pennsylvania. It serves the boroughs of Slatington and Walnutport, and Washington Township.

Students in grades nine through 12 attend Northern Lehigh High School in Slatington. As of the 2023–24 school year, the school district had a total enrollment of 1,597 students between all five of its schools, according to National Center for Education Statistics data.

Their school mascot is a bulldog and their nickname is Bulldogs.

== Schools ==
=== Northern Lehigh High School ===
Students in grades nine through 12 attend Northern Lehigh High School in Slatington. The principal of the High School is Lori Bali.

=== Northern Lehigh Middle School ===
The Northern Lehigh Middle School in Slatington admits students in grades 7 and 8 from the Northern Lehigh School District. The principal of the Middle School is Daniel Williams.

=== Peters Elementary School ===
Peters Elementary School is the only grade K-2 Elementary School in the district and is near the village of Friedens in Washington Township. The principal of Peters Elementary is James Schneiderite

=== Slatington Elementary School ===
Slatington Elementary School is in Slatington and is the only school that teaches students from grades 3–6 in the Northern Lehigh School District. The principal of Slatington Elementary is Todd Breiner. The building also houses the district warehouse and administrative offices.

==== Slatington Elementary Renovations ====
Construction began during the summer of 2010, with completion occurring in late 2011. Changes included adding more classrooms, new computer labs, a different playground, and modifying the setup from an open concept building to closed, individual classrooms.

== History ==
=== 19th Century ===
1890 postcard showing the first high school constructed in Slatington (on the left)

Prior to 1858, the children of Slatington attended a school one-half mile north of the Borough of Slatington while the children of "uptown" Slatington attended the Friedensville School, approximately one-half mile south of the borough.

The first school within the present limits of Slatington was in the old stone mill in Lower Slatington in 1820 which was built by William Kern, but it was only operated for a year or two. The next school was opened in 1858. At this time, a Welsh Church divided and the School Directors of Washington Township rented the stone church building located on West Church Street in the borough. This building was used for school purposes until 1868. A school also operated for a time in the second story of the Lehigh Slate Company's store.

From 1857 to 1866 Rev. A.G. Hamed, pastor of the Presbyterian congregation, maintained a private school in the church. It was taught for a part of the term by Solomon Berry of Maine. Other schools were held in private houses, but in 1868 most of them gave way to the Public Schools. In that year, the new school house was erected. It was a substantial structure measuring 47 feet by 50 feet, two stories high and built at a cost of $7,000. Dedicated on Sunday, August 30, 1868, the schools were divided into four departments: primary, secondary, grammar and high school. Enrollment hovered near the 200 pupil mark. In 1875, Professor Frank J. Stettler, who directed the grammar school for two years, became the principal. He re-graded the schools, established a better classification, and introduced a regular course of study. At this time, the attendance increased considerably and another primary school was opened in the McDowell Hall in Slatington. Higher studies were also introduced for advanced pupils in the high school.

In 1879, the number of pupils had increased substantially and more room was necessary. Consequently, an addition, two stories high and 25 feet by 45 feet, was built for $2,500, with the rooms being furnished for $1,000.

Slatington High School became popular and was attended by non-resident pupils from Northampton and Carbon County and adjoining districts in Lehigh County. In 1883, the overcrowded conditions of the school demanded more room and another addition was built. In September, a total of eight schools were opened. Beginning in 1875, Professor Stettler conducted a Summer Normal Institute for thirteen years during which time approximately 150 young men and women graduated as teachers. Most of them secured positions in Lehigh and adjoining counties. Two night schools were conducted for several years, one attended by quarry and factory boys, the other by teachers and advanced pupils. In 1890, the school had again become so overcrowded that more room was absolutely necessary. During the summer of 1890, a two-story, four-room brick building, 50 feet by 50 feet, was erected on Fairview Avenue, in the southeastern part of the borough.

In 1892, the board elected an assistant teacher in the high school. However, the primary school in the new building became overcrowded, it was necessary to employ an assistant teacher making 14 teachers in all. In 1897, the school authorities decided to require the high school to cover a period of three years instead of the former two year courses. This act retained the C years class in the high school for the years 1897 and 1898, and thus no graduation was held in the year 1897.

In 1896, the school, overcrowded for several years, reached its highest enrollment. In the spring of 1897, the school board broke ground for the erection of a new school building on Kuntz Street. The corner stone was laid on July 31, 1897 by the R.W. Grand Lodge of F. and A.M. of the Grand Jurisdiction of Pennsylvania.

=== 20th Century ===
The original Slatington High School on Kuntz Street, c. 1916

The first course of action in the new century involved the 1905 construction of the Franklin School House in Emerald, Washington Township. Just one year later, another school, the Third Ward School, later known as the Roosevelt Elementary School, was constructed on Walnut Street within the borough of Slatington. At the turn of the new decade, construction on another elementary school, took place in Slatedale. In 1916, construction on a new high school was begun at the corner of Second and Main Streets, taking the spot of the old elementary school. The new high school opened to students in January 1918. In the meantime, in February 1917, fire destroyed the original high school, which was rebuilt and then reopened in 1919 as the Lincoln Elementary School.

Little occurred for the school district over the next twenty years, until, in 1937, the new Smith Hall Athletic Complex was constructed, giving a home court for the Slatington Slater basketball team closer to their home high school, located one block away.

On July 7, 1952, a merger between the Slatington School District and the Walnutport School District became reality. The new school district became the Blue Valley Union School District. Washington Township School District remained as before. In the early portion of 1953, construction of new Walnutport Elementary School, located at Lincoln Avenue in the borough of Walnutport began. On August 20, 1953, a joint school agreement was made between the Blue Valley Union School District and the Washington Township School District known as the Northern Lehigh Joint Schools. From 1953 to 1966, three board meetings were conducted each month; the Blue Valley Union School Board, the Washington Township School Board, and the Northern Lehigh Joint Schools. The Board of the Northern Lehigh Joint Schools was composed of representatives from the two school districts' Boards.

In 1954, two elementary schools within the district underwent transformations. An addition was added to the Slatedale Building while Peters Elementary was constructed in Friedens. 1955 was deemed the last full school year children from Lynn and Heidelberg Townships could attend Slatington High School, due to the addition of the Northwestern Lehigh School District. The next year, Lynn-Heidelberg seniors were granted the ability to finish their final year of schooling in Slatington. At the end of the decade, in 1959, construction of the new high school at 600 North Diamond Street on Kuehner Hill was completed. The former high school building on Main Street then became the Junior High School.

The year 1966 was a busy one for the Northern Lehigh schools. To kick off the year, an addition to Peters Elementary was accomplished. On July 1, 1966, the Blue Valley Union School District and the Washington Township School District merged to form the Northern Lehigh School District as we know it today. The district is now composed of the Boroughs of Walnutport, Slatington, and the Township of Washington; a total of 27 square miles (70 km2). On August 27, 1966 the Franklin School House, located in Emerald, was sold.

The first elementary school in Maple Spring Acres, Slatington Elementary School and its adjoining Administrative Offices at 1201 Shadow Oaks Lane, was completed on October 11, 1973. Just two years later, due to the building of the new elementary school, the Walnutport Elementary School, known as the "Whitehouse Building" was sold and the former Lincoln Elementary school demolished.

On June 11, 1980, the Slatington High School and Slatington Junior High School names were changed on June 11, 1980 to the Northern Lehigh High School and the Northern Lehigh Junior High School. On October 10 of the same year the Lincoln Elementary School property and Smith Hall Athletic Complex property were sold to Lehigh County Housing Authority for $75,000.00. A year later, in May 1981, the Slatedale Elementary building was sold; from this point forward, the only elementary school in Washington Township was found at Peters Elementary. Construction of the new Northern Lehigh High School was completed this year, just across the street from the former high school building on the site of the old Alumni Football Field. At this juncture in time, the student enrollment for the district was 2,220, the highest on record.

On October 2, 1982 the old Junior High School at Main and Second Streets was sold. This building was later demolished in the early 2000s. Also in this year, the former Smith Hall Athletic Complex was demolished in order to build housing for the elderly of Slatington. Renovations to the former high school at 600 North Diamond Street completed its transition to a Junior High School.

In 1990, construction of a new 50-foot x 50-foot weight room facility was completed; the facilities were fully supported by Northern Lehigh Athletic Association parents. Since then, renovations have occurred. Two years later, the Peters Elementary building was renovated, adding another two-story wing. Enrollment for the district was slightly down from its 1981 record, at 2,158 students.

=== 21st century ===
To kick off the turn of the century, an addition to the Northern Lehigh High School composed of two classrooms and a library was completed; this helped accommodate the transfer of 9th Grade from the Junior High School. Renovations were also completed at the Junior High School, which completed the transition to a Middle School building.

Extensive work has been done to the schools since 2001. Each school has been beautified with various murals and Northern Lehigh banners flying on their premises. Renovations to Slatington Elementary were completed in the fall of 2011, converting the school from an open-concept building to a classroom setting. Just a year later, a fully synthetic turf field was installed at the newly renamed Bulldog Community Stadium, which allowed soccer and field hockey matches to be played in the stadium on a full-time basis along with football.

== School board ==
- President Gary S. Fedorcha (2021)
- Vice President Robin T. Distler (2019)
- Secretary Kristie D. Wilk (2019)
- Treasurer Donna M. Kulp (2019)
- Robin Distler (2019)
- Matthias J. Green Jr. (2019)
- Michelle M. Heckman (2021)
- Gale Husack (2019)
- Robert J. Keegan Jr. (2021)
- Michele Martineau (2019)

Year in parentheses is when terms expire.
