= Maury Schleicher =

American gridiron football player (1937–2004)

No. 87, 81
- Positions: Defensive end, linebacker

Personal information
- Born: July 17, 1937; Walnutport, Pennsylvania, U.S.
- Died: April 15, 2004 (aged 66); Modesto, California, U.S.
- Listed height: 6 ft 3 in (1.91 m)
- Listed weight: 238 lb (108 kg)

Career information
- High school: Slatington (Slatington, Pennsylvania)
- College: Penn State
- NFL draft: 1959: 5th round, 50th overall pick

Career history

Playing
- Chicago Cardinals (1959); Los Angeles / San Diego Chargers (1960–1962); Toronto Argonauts (1963)

Coaching
- Oakland Raiders (1965) Linebackers coach

Career NFL/AFL statistics
- Interceptions: 1
- Fumble recoveries: 1
- Stats at Pro Football Reference

Maury Schleicher (July 17, 1937 – April 15, 2004) was an American football defensive end and linebacker. He played for the Chicago Cardinals in 1959, the Los Angeles / San Diego Chargers from 1960 to 1962 and for the Toronto Argonauts in 1963.
