= Best Station, Pennsylvania =

Unincorporated community in Pennsylvania, U.S.

Coordinates: 40°43′30″N 75°39′22″W

Best Station is an exurban unincorporated community in northern Lehigh County in the U.S. state of Pennsylvania. It is located in Washington Township.

Best Station is part of the Lehigh Valley, which had a population of 861,899 and was the 68th-most populous metropolitan area in the U.S. as of the 2020 census.

== History ==
A post office called Best was established in 1875, and remained in operation until 1914. The name was selected to promote the place as the "best" station around.
