= Portrait of a Young Man with a Lamp =

Painting by Lorenzo Lotto

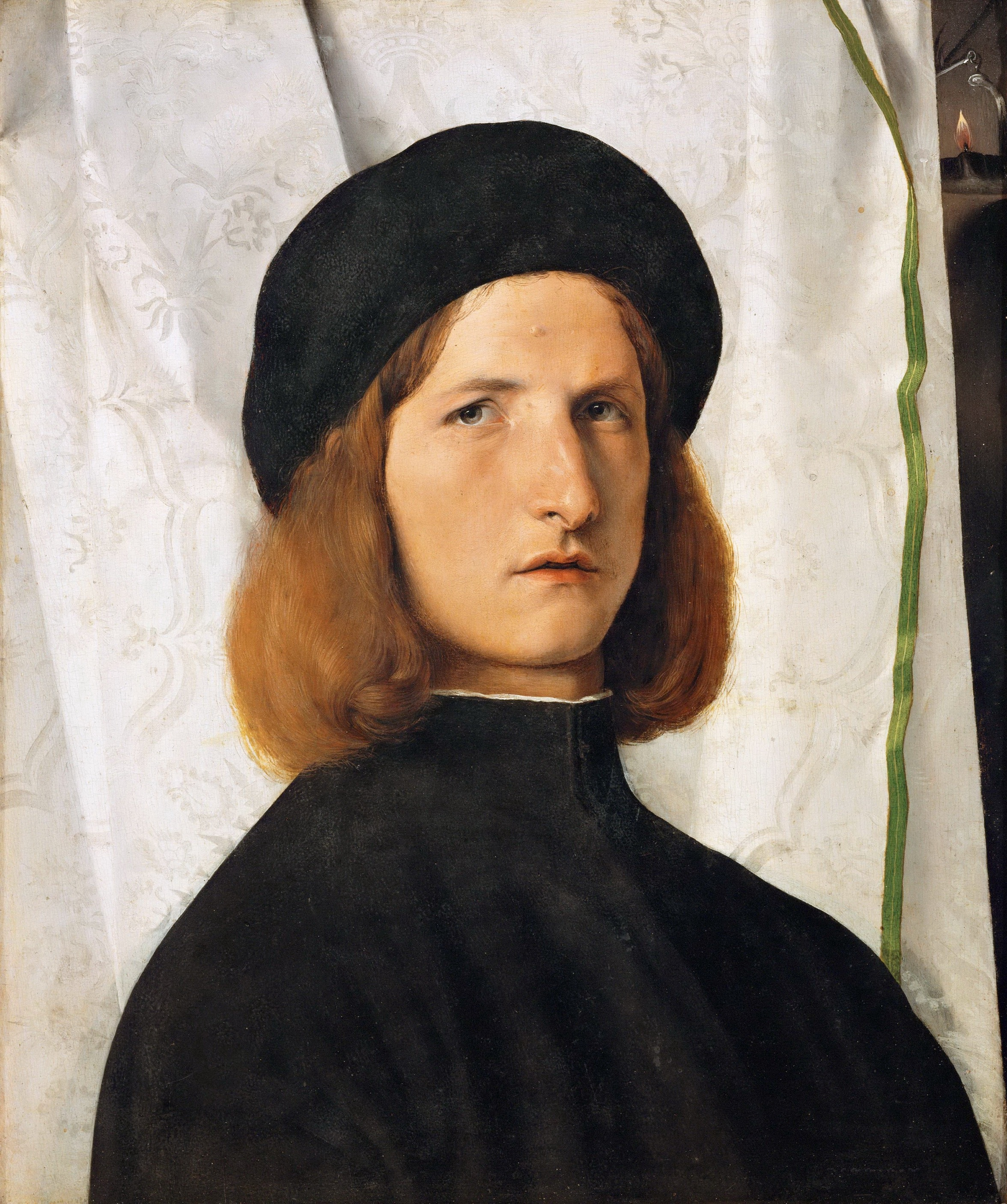
- Artist: Lorenzo Lotto
- Year: c. 1506
- Medium: Oil on canvas
- Dimensions: 42.3 cm × 35.3 cm (16.7 in × 13.9 in)
- Location: Kunsthistorisches Museum; Vienna

The Portrait of a Young Man with a Lamp is an oil-on-canvas painting by the Italian High Renaissance painter Lorenzo Lotto, dating to c. 1506. It is housed in the Kunsthistorisches Museum of Vienna, Austria.

The work is generally ascribed to Lotto's stay in Treviso. It was acquired by the Viennese museum in 1816.

== Description ==
The picture portrays the bust a young man from three-quarter, looking at the viewer. It shows an extreme attention to details, such as the slight epidermic imperfections, the elongated nose, the soft hair. The use of light and the composition are similar to other early works by Lotto, such as the Portrait of Bishop Bernardo de' Rossi (1505). The face is framed by the dark clothes and hat, painted over a white brocade drapery with a green border.

On the right, an opening to a darker background shows a burning lamp, a symbol which could allude to the man's personality or deeds, and which has been variously interpreted (from a reference to an evangelic episode to an allegory of the human life's shortness, due to the dimness of the flame).

Art historians have speculated that the sitter may be Broccardo Malchiostro, the young chancellor of the bishop of Treviso, Bernardo de' Rossi, who both risked their lives in a plot in 1503. The decoration of the drapery would thus be an example of the use of charades: it is a brocade with carduus, whence "Brocade + carduus = Brocardus". Such allusions are contained in several Lotto works, such as the Portrait of Lucina Brembati, painted during his maturity. However, recent scholarship has suggested that the fabric behind the sitter is closer to a damask than a brocade, calling the identification into question.

== See also ==
- Portrait of Lucina Brembati

== Sources ==
- Falomir, Miguel (2018). Lorenzo Lotto: Portraits. Madrid: Museo del Prado.
- Pirovano, Carlo (2002). Lotto. Milan: Electa.
