= Vigilant Fire Company Firemen's Monument =

- U.S. National Register of Historic Places
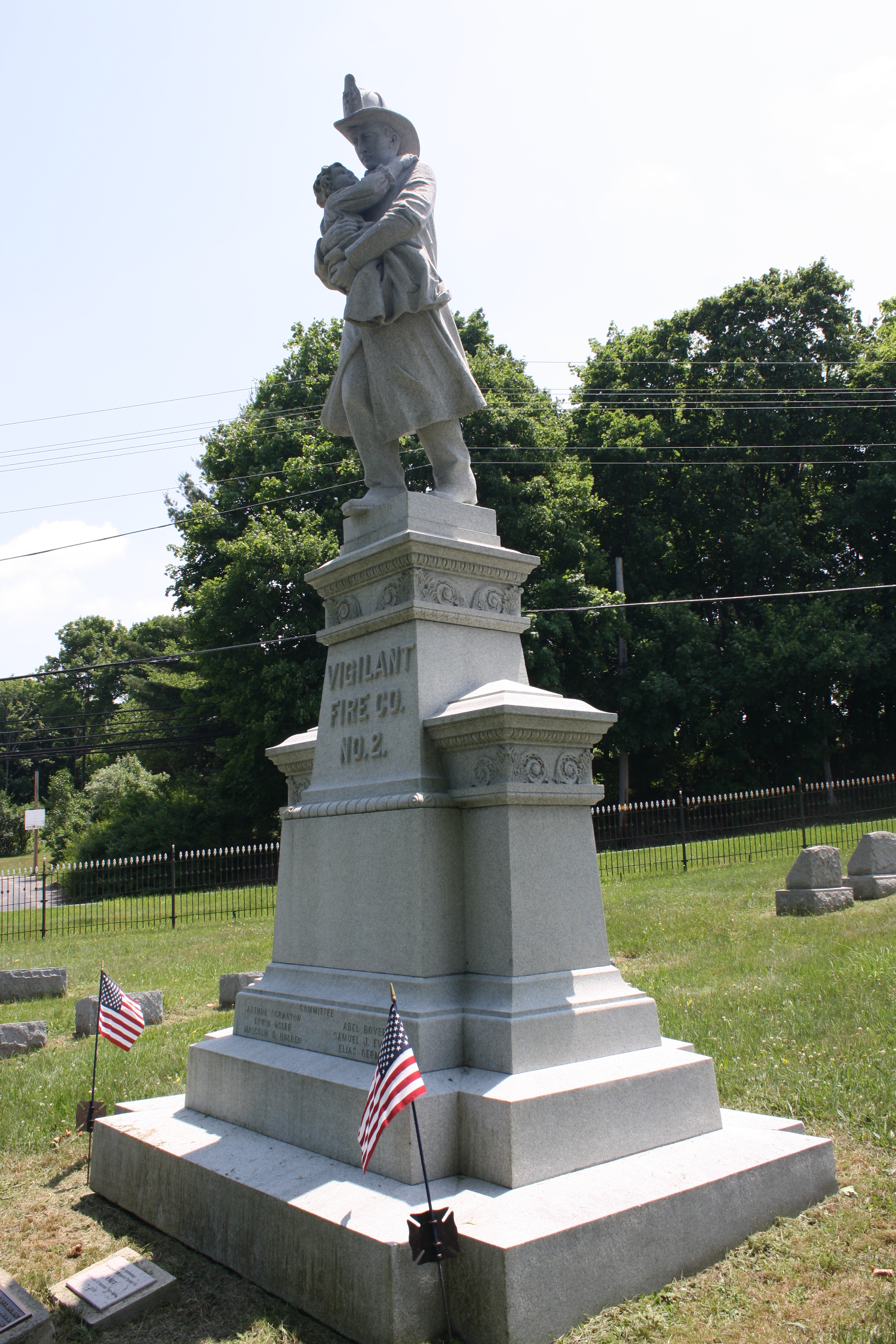
- Vigilant Fire Company Firemen's Monument in June 2013

- Location within Pennsylvania Location within the United States
- Location: Union Cemetery in Washington Township, Pennsylvania, U.S.
- Coordinates: 40°44′23″N 75°36′49″W
- Area: less than one acre
- Built: 1909
- Built by: Scheirer, Frank A.
- NRHP reference No.: 04000838
- Added to NRHP: August 11, 2004

Vigilant Fire Company Firemen's Monument is a historic monument located at Washington Township, Lehigh County, Pennsylvania.

It was added to the National Register of Historic Places in 2004.

== History ==
Erected in 1909 and dedicated on September 16, 1909, the Vigilant Fire Company Fireman's Monument is a 16-foot-high granite monument on a concrete base, which is situated on a plot of land chosen by the fire company for its visibility from the highway. Crafted by local stone mason Frank Scheirer at a cost of $2,200, the monument incorporates a 7-foot-tall statue of an early 20th-century fireman with a handlebar mustache, pointed fire hat, fire coat, and boots, holding a young girl in both arms.

Arthur Scranton, a member of the Vigilant Fire Company, was responsible for the erection of the monument, according to the monument's dedication plaque.

== Burials ==
Initially planned as a burial site for firemen who had faced financial hardships or were without family at their respective times of death, the place of the monument was expanded to allow for the burial of career and volunteer firemen. Three firemen who are interred here are: Harry J. Henritzy. Marcus Hessman, and Theodore Hoffman.

== Gallery ==
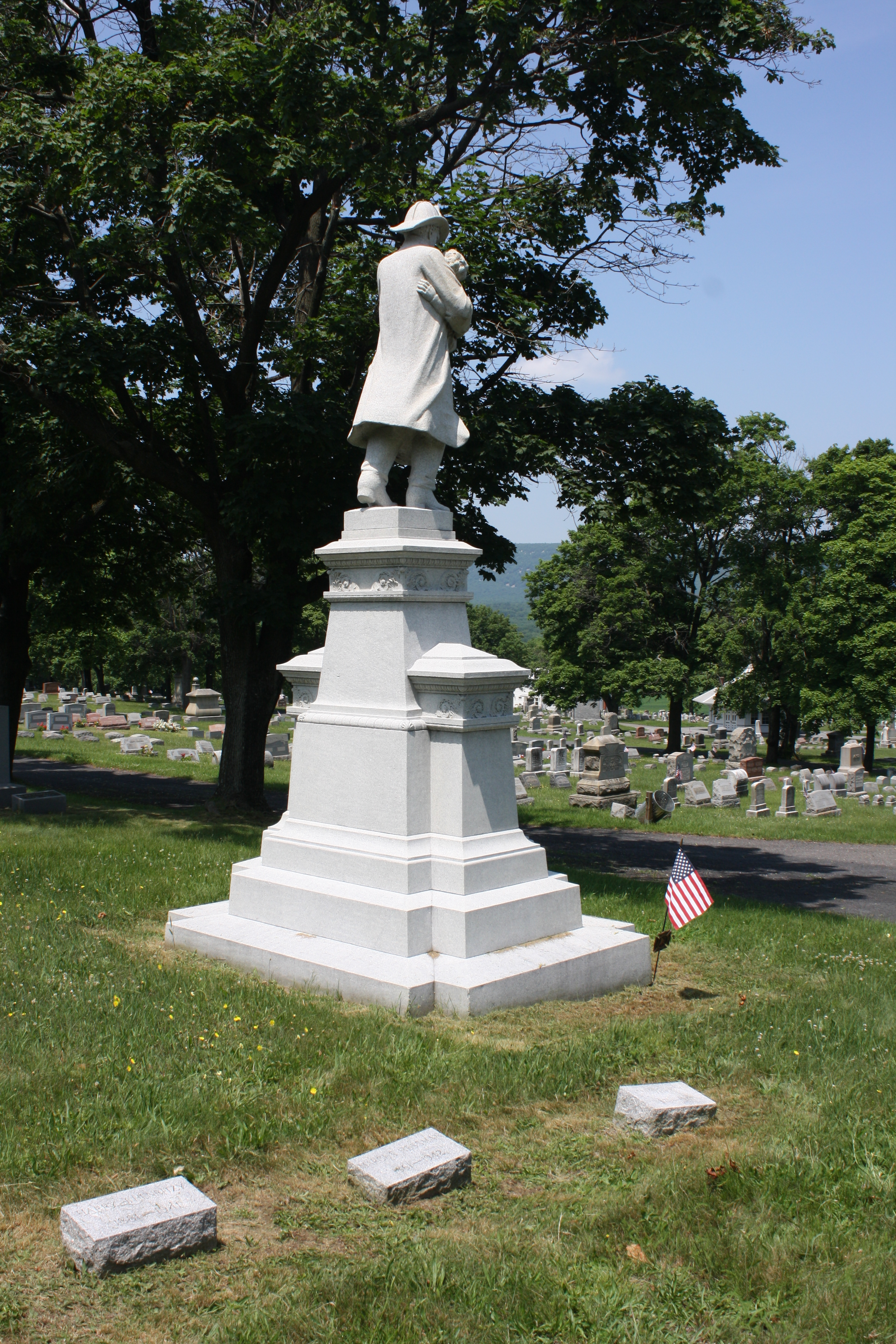
Tombs of firemen

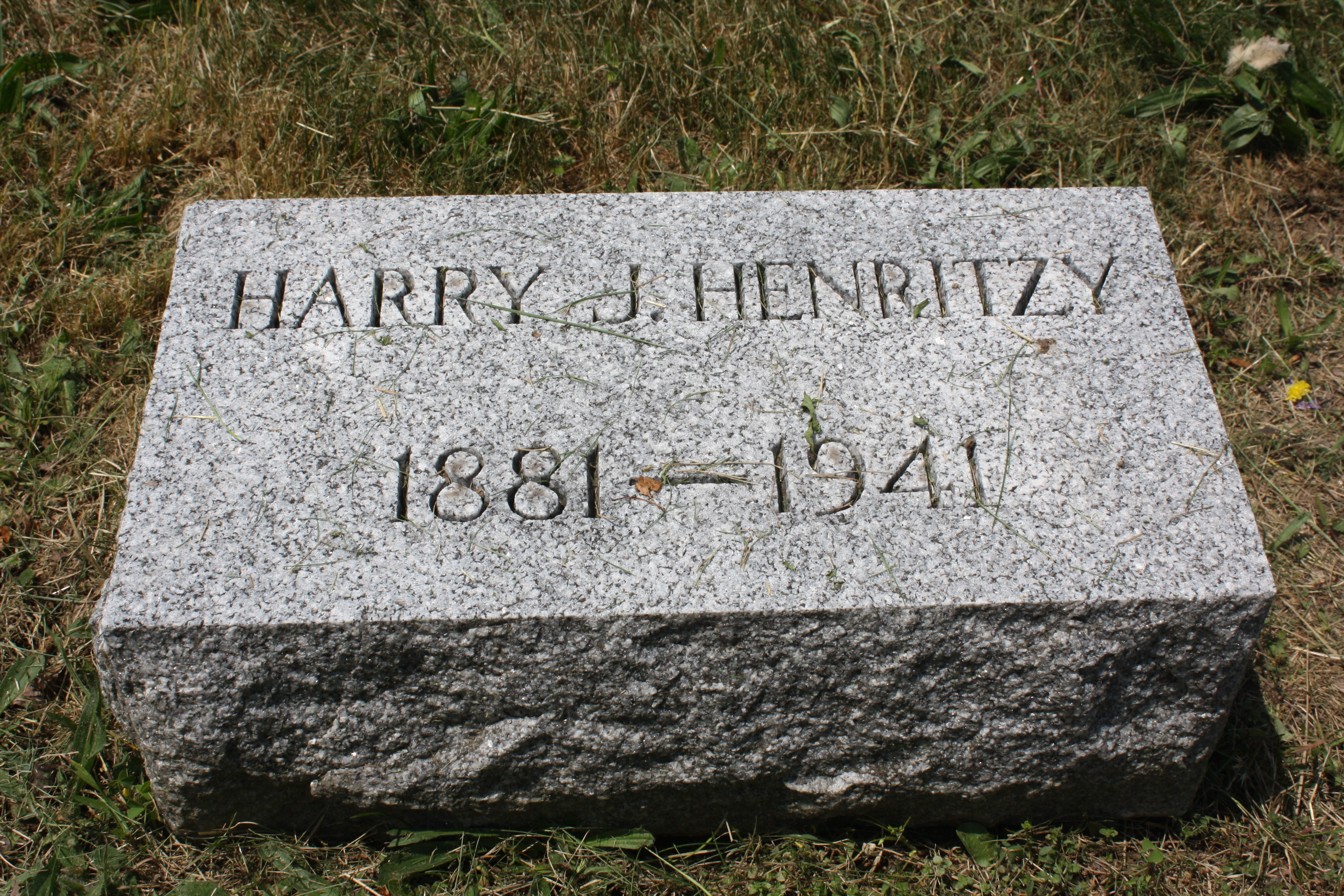
Tomb of Harry J. Henritzy (1881-1941)

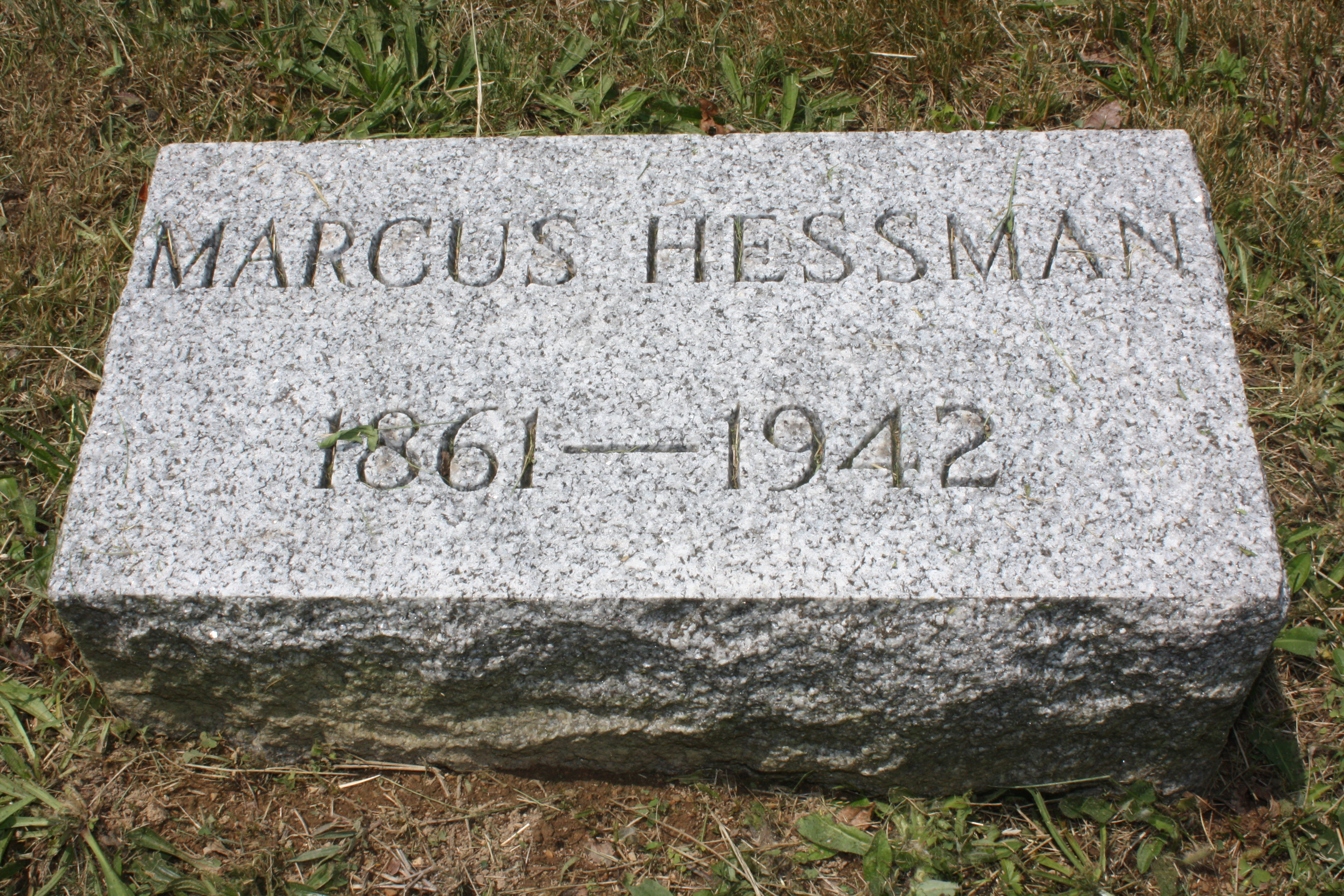
Tomb of Marcus Hessman (1861-1942)

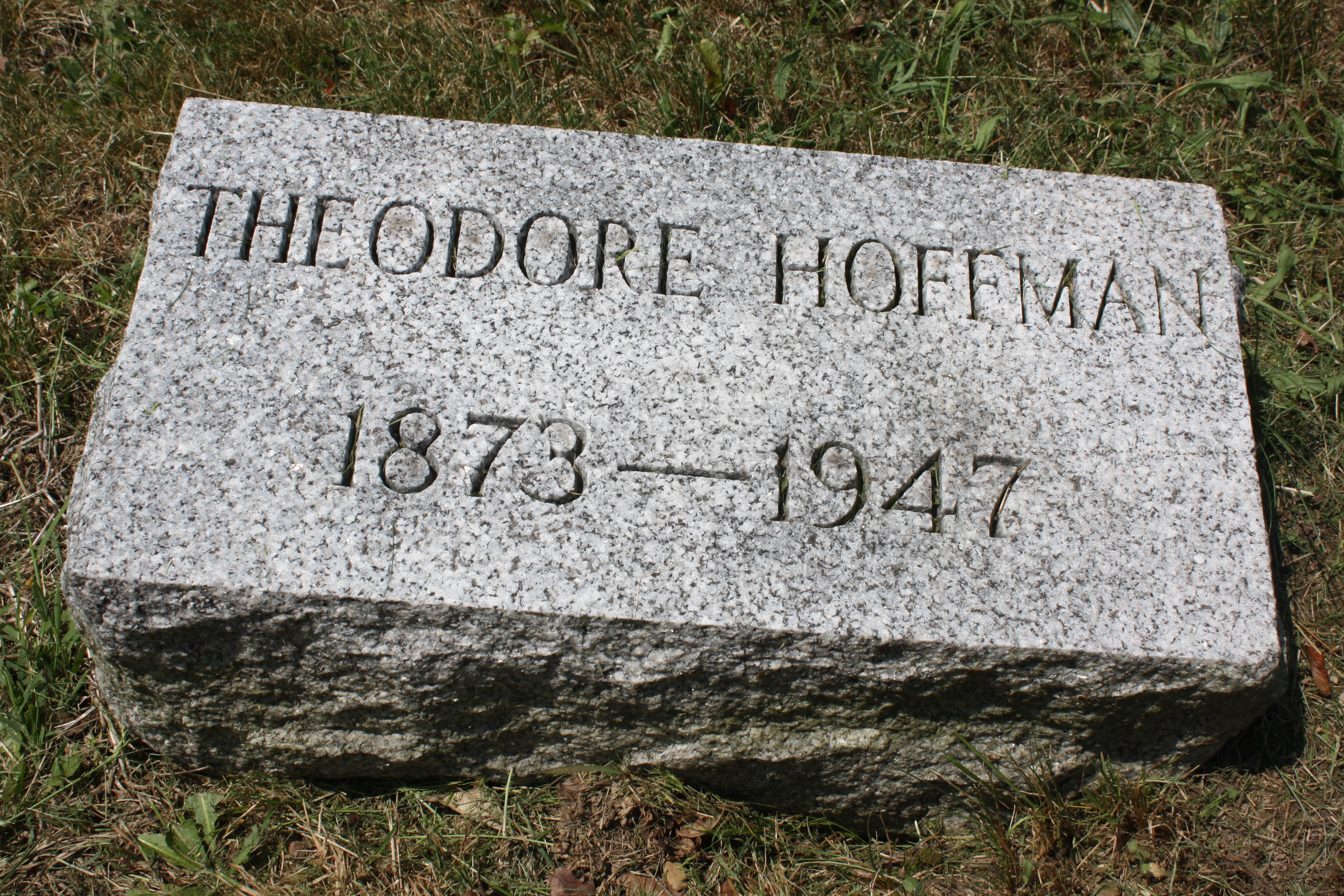
Tomb of Theodore Hoffman (1873-1947)

== See also ==
- List of firefighting monuments and memorials
