= Portrait of Lucina Brembati =

Painting by Lorenzo Lotto

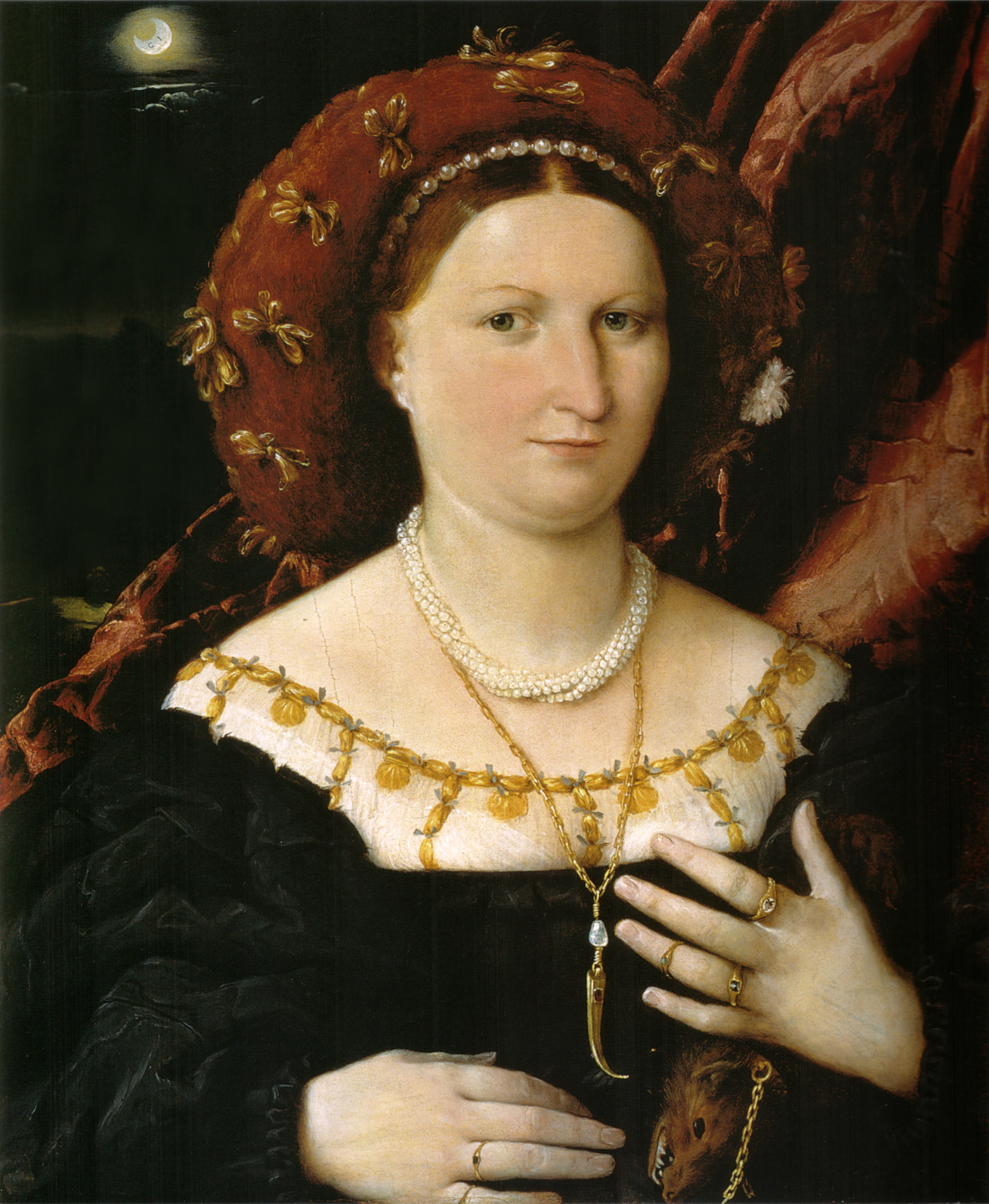
- Artist: Lorenzo Lotto
- Year: c. 1518
- Medium: Oil on panel
- Dimensions: 52.6 cm × 44.8 cm (20.7 in × 17.6 in)
- Location: Accademia Carrara; Bergamo

The Portrait of Lucina Brembati is an oil-on-panel painting by the Italian High Renaissance painter Lorenzo Lotto, dating to c. 1518. It is housed in the Accademia Carrara of Bergamo, northern Italy.

The work is known since 1882, when the Accademia acquired it from a private collection. The subject was identified later, after the rebus included in it was recognized: the moon in the upper left background contains the inscription "CI", which, in Italian, translates as "CI in Luna", e.g. "LuCIna"; the Brembati coat of arms is instead contained in ring of the woman's left forefinger.

== Description ==
The painting is a bust portrait, with the face slightly from three-quarters. Lucina wears rich clothes with gilt ribbons and shell-shaped embroideries, as well as several jewels including a necklace of pearls, and another with a horn-shaped pendant, which at the time was used as a toothpick.

Working differently from the idealized portraits Titian and Palma the Elder had made widespread in Venice, Lotto used a more realistic approach: this is shown is details such as the asymmetric face, the weighty chin, and the sharp nose. In this he followed the local tradition of painters such as Paolo Cavazzola.

According to some scholars, touching of the womb could be an allusion to the character's pregnancy state. The dead weasel could also symbolize the defeat of a presage of disgrace for pregnant woman. According to other scholars, the weasel could symbolize marital fidelity. The background includes a heavy red brocade drapery with a night sky.

== See also ==
- Portrait of a Young Man with a Lamp
- Exhibition notes on Lucina Brembati, Canberra 2011-2012

== Sources ==
- Pirovano, Carlo (2002). Lotto. Milan: Electa.
