= Samuel Henry Kress =

American businessman, and philanthropist (1863–1955)

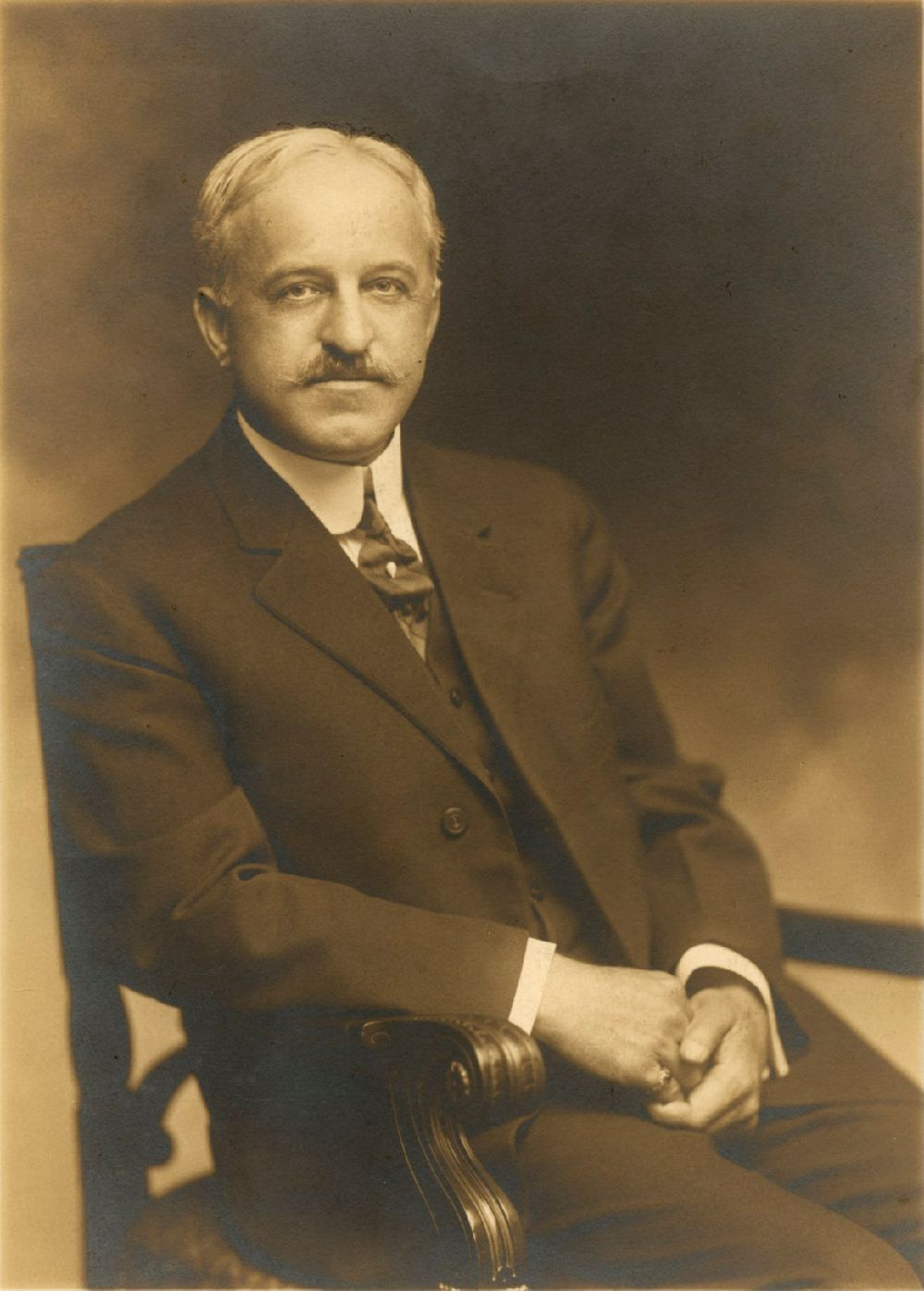
- Samuel H. Kress c. 1910
- Born: July 23, 1863; Cherryville, Pennsylvania, U.S.
- Died: September 22, 1955 (aged 92); New York City, New York, U.S.
- Occupation: Founder of S. H. Kress & Co.

Samuel Henry Kress (July 23, 1863 – September 22, 1955) was a businessman, philanthropist, and founder of the S. H. Kress & Co. five and ten cent store chain. With his fortune, Kress amassed one of the most significant collections of Italian Renaissance and European artwork assembled in the 20th century. In the 1950s and 1960s, a foundation established by Kress would donate 776 works of art from the Kress collection to 18 regional art museums in the United States.

== Early life and education ==
Kress was born in Cherryville, Pennsylvania, near Allentown, the second of seven children born to John Franklin Kress and Margaret Dodson (née Conner) Kress. His father was a retail merchant. His siblings were Mary Conner Kress, Jennie Weston Kress, Palmer John Kress, Claude Washington Kress, and Rush Harrison Kress. Another sibling, Elmer Kress, died ten days after birth. Kress never married or had children. He was a Mason.

Young Kress attended schools in Slatington, Pennsylvania.

== Career ==
Kress worked for a while in the stone quarries. He earned his teaching credentials by age 17 and began work as a schoolteacher in Emerald, Pennsylvania. His first position was instructor for a class of 80 students, and he was paid $25 per month. He walked 3 miles each way to the schoolhouse.

In 1887, Kress opened a stationery and notions store in Nanticoke, Pennsylvania. As the business prospered, he used his profits to open additional stores, naming his chain S. H. Kress & Co. These eventually became popularly known as the Kress Five and Dime stores. Unlike many businessmen of his day who only opened their stores in large urban areas, Kress wisely located his stores in smaller cities in 29 states he felt had growth potential. These stores became the jewel of many of these cities, which only had a dry goods or general store until then. By the mid-1920s, he was living in a penthouse at 1020 Fifth Avenue in New York City, across the street from the Metropolitan Museum of Art, which he visited and contributed to regularly.

== S. H. Kress & Co. ==
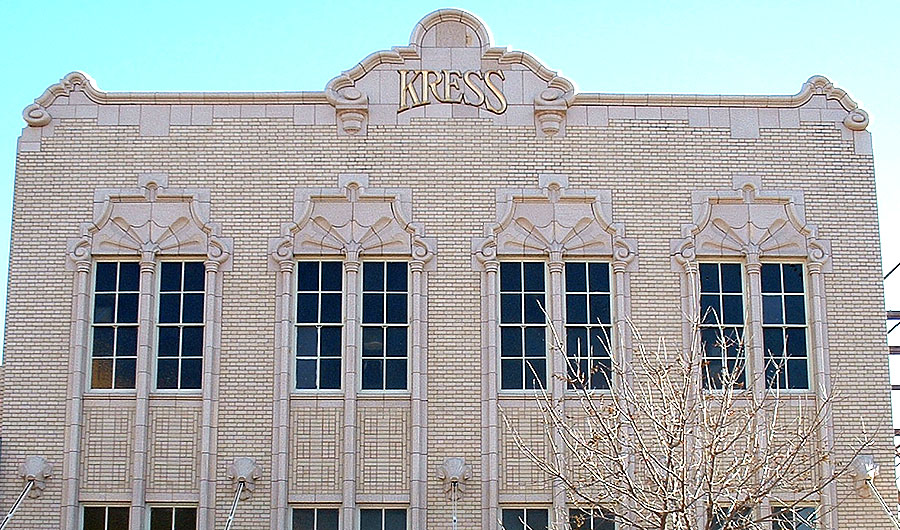
A Kress store building, showing the characteristic design

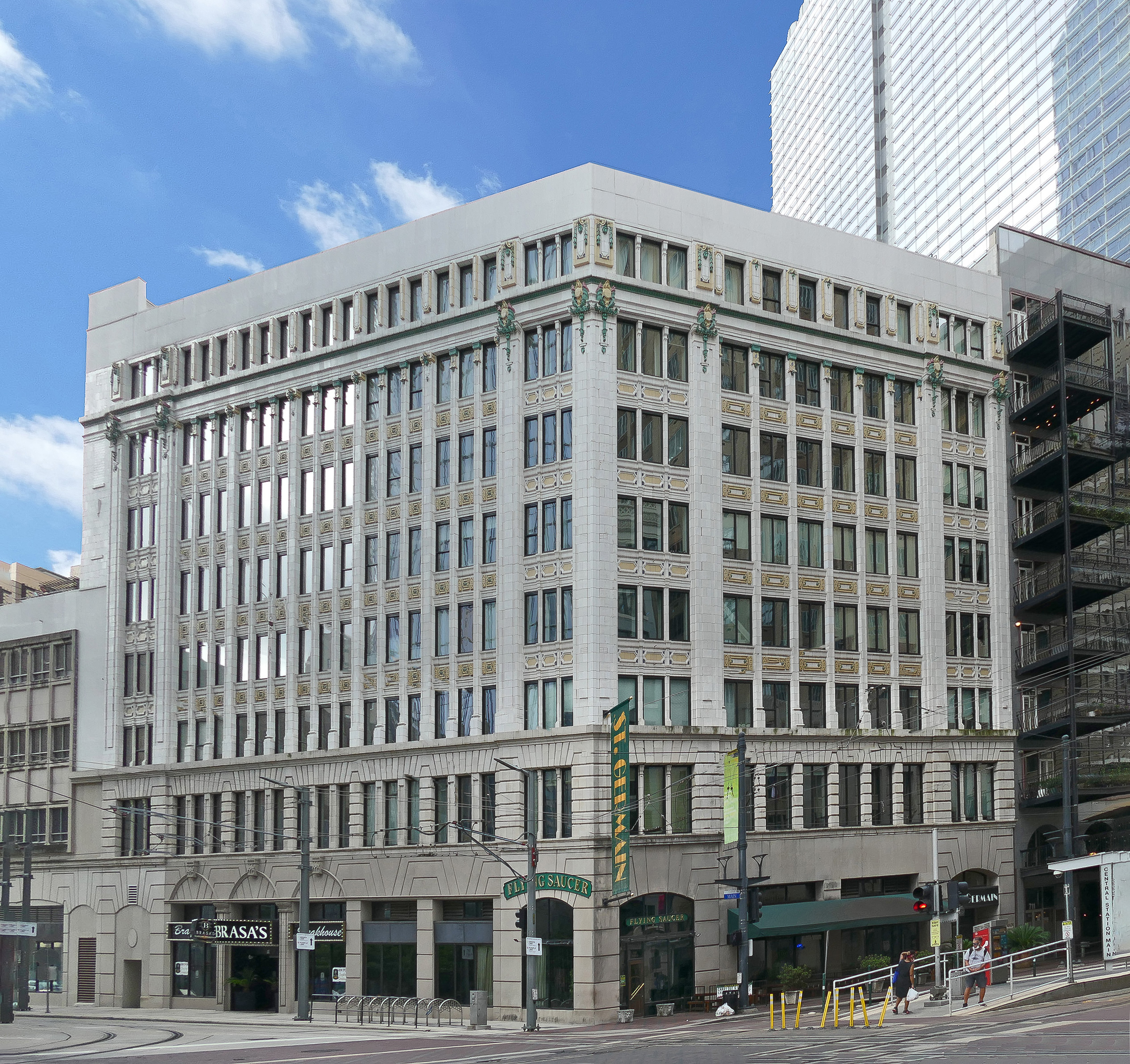
The Kress building -- Houston, Texas

S. H. Kress & Co., a chain of "five and dime" retail department stores, was started in Nanticoke, Pennsylvania, by Samuel H. Kress in 1896. Eventually expanding to over 200 locations nationwide, Kress stores were long a familiar sight in many cities and towns of the United States. The Kress chain was known for the fine architecture of the stores, with a number of locations being hailed by architects for their design. A number of former Kress stores, now put to other uses, are ranked as landmarks. Some of the most well-known Kress locations included New York City's Fifth Avenue; Canal Street, New Orleans; and Hollywood's Hollywood Boulevard. In 1964 ownership of Kress was acquired by Genesco, Inc. The company abandoned its center-city stores and moved to the shopping malls. Genesco began liquidating Kress and closing down the Kress stores in 1980.

== Samuel H. Kress Foundation ==
Kress was founder and president of the eponymous Samuel H. Kress Foundation. An avid art lover, he acquired, through art dealers Alessandro Contini-Bonacossi and Joseph Duveen, often with the advice of art historian William Suida, a collection of paintings and sculpture, primarily of the Italian Renaissance school. In 1929 he gave the Italian government a large sum for the restoration of a number of architectural treasures in Italy. Beginning in the 1930s Kress decided to give much of his art collection to museums across the country while he was still alive. Many paintings were donated to the same smaller cities that had brought him his fortune with their stores. In several cases, his gifts became the founding basis for museums in those areas which otherwise could never have afforded artworks of such importance and quality.

On March 17, 1941, Kress and Paul Mellon gave large gifts of art to the people of the United States and the nascent National Gallery of Art in Washington, D.C. Franklin D. Roosevelt accepted the gift personally.

Today, the masterpieces Kress donated are considered priceless and the Kress Foundation has dispensed millions of dollars to worthy organizations and institutions in the years since.

== Kress Collection of Historic Images, National Gallery of Art ==
The Kress Collection of Historic Images at the National Gallery of Art—more than 18,300 scans of paintings, drawings, sculptures, and decorative arts purchased or once considered for purchase by Samuel H. Kress and the foundation he established in 1929—has been digitized, making these significant holdings more accessible to researchers around the world through the Gallery's department of image collections. Kress donated most of these objects to 90 museums, colleges, and other institutions in 33 states, with the greater number of these gifts coming to the National Gallery of Art. Images from this collection document works of art in various states of conservation, as well as some x-ray, infrared, and ultraviolet images. In a few cases, the files include scans of comments by scholars written on the backs of the photographs. Photographs of Samuel Kress's apartment in New York show 282 magnificent objects as they were arranged before their dispersal.

Art historians, conservators, and students have used these images to enhance their understanding of these objects. The photographs can illuminate aspects of the works of art that we can no longer see. For instance, conservators routinely study these images in order to anticipate remnants of earlier damage or restorations. Art historians may compare high-resolution details to other known works by an artist to assist in attribution questions. Students may better understand the "life" of a work of art by seeing changes over time, illustrated through a variety of reproductive processes.

The Kress Collection of Historic Images project was made possible by two generous grants by the Samuel H. Kress Foundation.

=== Museums with significant donations from the Kress Foundation ===
- Allentown Art Museum, Allentown, Pennsylvania—Paintings: 50, Sculptures: 3
- Birmingham Museum of Art, Birmingham, Alabama—Paintings: 34, Sculptures: 2, Furniture: 13, Decorative Arts: 4
- Columbia Museum of Art, Columbia, South Carolina—Paintings: 46, Sculptures: 2, Bronzes: 11, Furniture: 9, Tapestries: 10
- Denver Art Museum, Denver, Colorado—Paintings: 46, Sculptures: 4
- El Paso Museum of Art, El Paso, Texas—Paintings: 56, Sculptures: 2
- Fine Arts Museums of San Francisco, San Francisco, California—Paintings: 37, Sculpture: 1
- High Museum of Art, Atlanta, Georgia—Paintings: 29, Sculptures: 3, Furniture: 13
- Honolulu Museum of Art, Honolulu, Hawaii—Paintings: 14
- Lowe Art Museum, Coral Gables, Florida—Paintings: 44, Sculptures: 3
- Memphis Brooks Museum of Art, Memphis, Tennessee—Paintings: 27, Sculptures: 2
- Museum of Fine Arts, Houston, Houston, Texas—Paintings: 30
- National Building Museum, Washington, D.C.
- National Gallery of Art, Washington, D.C. -- Paintings: 376, Sculptures: 94, Bronzes: 1307, Drawings: 38
- Nelson-Atkins Museum of Art, Kansas City, Missouri—Paintings: 14, Sculptures: 2
- New Orleans Museum of Art, New Orleans, Louisiana—Paintings: 29
- North Carolina Museum of Art, Raleigh, North Carolina—Paintings: 73, Sculptures: 2
- Philbrook Museum of Art, Tulsa, Oklahoma—Paintings: 30, Sculptures: 6
- Ponce Museum of Art, Ponce, Puerto Rico—Paintings: 15
- Portland Art Museum, Portland, Oregon—Paintings: 30, Sculptures: 2
- Seattle Art Museum, Seattle, Washington—Paintings: 33, Sculptures: 2
- Smart Museum of Art, Chicago, Illinois—Paintings: 16, Sculptures: 3, Decorative Arts: 3
- University of Arizona Museum of Art, Tucson, Arizona—Paintings: 60, Sculptures: 3
- Vanderbilt University Fine Arts Gallery, Nashville, Tennessee—Paintings: 12

== Death ==
Kress died on September 22, 1955, and is interred in the Woodlawn Cemetery in The Bronx, New York City.
