= Ted Wieand =

American baseball player (1933–2021)

- Pitcher
- Born: April 4, 1933; Walnutport, Pennsylvania, U.S.
- Died: July 7, 2021 (aged 88); Allentown, Pennsylvania, U.S.
- Batted: Right Threw: Right

MLB debut
- September 27, 1958, for the Cincinnati Redlegs

Last MLB appearance
- April 24, 1960, for the Cincinnati Reds

MLB statistics
- Win–loss record: 0–1
- Earned run average: 9.95
- Innings pitched: 6⅓
- Stats at Baseball Reference

Teams
- Cincinnati Redlegs/Reds (1958, 1960)

Franklin Delano Roosevelt "Ted" Wieand (April 4, 1933 – July 7, 2021) was an American professional baseball pitcher who appeared in six games (all in relief) in Major League Baseball (MLB) over parts of two seasons (1958 and 1960) for the Cincinnati Reds. Born in Walnutport, Pennsylvania, he threw and batted right-handed, stood 6 feet 2 inches (1.88 m) tall and weighed 195 pounds (88 kg).

== Early career ==
Wieand signed with the St. Louis Cardinals in 1952. On December 5, 1957, he was traded to the Cincinnati Redlegs (as the Reds were then called) with fellow pitchers Marty Kutyna and Willard Schmidt for young centerfielder Curt Flood and another outfielder, Joe Taylor. Flood became a three-time All-Star in St. Louis, a key member of three National League champions and winner of two World Series rings (1964 and 1967). Moreover, he changed the game of baseball by his 1969 legal challenge of the transfer system and reserve clause, eventually resulting in the Curt Flood Act of 1998, which limits Major League Baseball's antitrust exemption in labor matters.

== Major League Baseball ==
=== 1958 season ===
Wieand made his MLB debut on September 27, 1958, facing the Milwaukee Braves at County Stadium. He came into the game in the fourth inning in relief of Cincinnati starter Jay Hook. He pitched the fourth and fifth frames, giving up four hits and two runs, including a home run to Frank Torre—the first MLB batter he faced. He also struck out two, with Hall of Famer Warren Spahn being his first victim.

=== 1960 season ===
Wieand did not appear in the major leagues again until April 14, 1960, when he faced the Pittsburgh Pirates at Forbes Field. He entered the game in the eighth inning to mop up and retired Pittsburgh in order, as the Pirates drubbed the Reds, 13–0.

Wieand next worked three days later in another game against the Pirates at Forbes Field. He came into the contest in the bottom of the ninth inning to preserve a 5–4 Reds' lead. After Don Hoak grounded out, Dick Groat singled to center. The next batter, Bob Skinner, slammed a home run to give the Pirates a 6–5 victory and Wieand his first and only major league decision. Three days later, he again appeared against the Braves at County Stadium. He came out of the bullpen in the bottom of the seventh inning, with the Reds trailing 4–1. He gave up one hit, one walk, and one strikeout. The hold was significant, however, as Cincinnati came back to win, 10–5, by scoring nine runs in the game's final three innings; Raúl Sánchez received credit for the victory.

Two days later, Wieand came into a game against the Philadelphia Phillies at Connie Mack Stadium in the eighth inning in a mop-up role with the Phillies leading the Reds, 10–6. Two days later, against the same Phillies and in the same stadium, he made his final appearance in the majors. He entered the game in the bottom of the eighth inning to replace starting pitcher Bob Purkey. The Reds were leading 5–4, but the Phillies were threatening with runners on second and third with no one out. Wieand intentionally walked Harry Anderson to load the bases. But the gambit backfired when Wieand was unable to find the plate, and walked Joe Koppe to force in the tying run. The next batter, Jimmie Coker, slammed his second career home run and the first grand slam of his career to give the Phillies an insurmountable 9–5 lead, with Purkey charged with the defeat. In his six MLB games, Wieand allowed eight hits and five walks in 6⅓ innings pitched; he fanned five. Three of the eight hits he permitted were home runs.

His pitching career continued in the minor leagues through 1962.

== Personal life ==
Weiand was a longtime resident of Slatington, Pennsylvania, where he graduated from high school in 1951. He died on July 7, 2021, in an Allentown, Pennsylvania, hospital at age 88.
