= Slatedale, Pennsylvania =

Unincorporated community in Pennsylvania, US

- Census-designated place
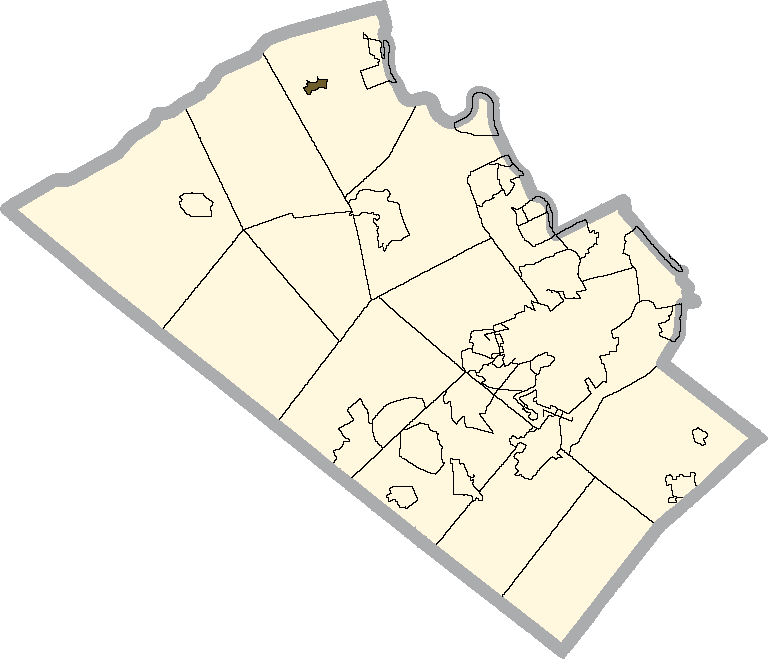
- Location of Slatedale in Lehigh County, Pennsylvania

- Location of Slatedale in Pennsylvania Location in the United States
- Coordinates: 40°44′40″N 75°39′24″W
- Country: United States
- State: Pennsylvania
- County: Lehigh
- Township: Washington

Area
  - Census-designated place: 0.30 sq mi (0.77 km^{2})
  - Land: 0.30 sq mi (0.77 km^{2})
  - Water: 0 sq mi (0.0 km^{2})
- Elevation: 501 ft (153 m)

Population (2010)
  - Census-designated place: 455
  - Density: 1,500/sq mi (590/km^{2})
  - Metro: 865,310 (US: 68th)
- Time zone: UTC-5 (Eastern (EST))
  - Summer (DST): UTC-4 (EDT)
- ZIP Codes: 18079, 18080
- Area codes: 610 and 484
- FIPS code: 42-71080
- GNIS feature ID: 1187788

Slatedale is an unincorporated community and census-designated place (CDP) in Washington Township, Lehigh County, Pennsylvania. As of the 2010 census, it had a population of 455. It is part of the Lehigh Valley, which had a population of 861,899 and was the 68th-most populous metropolitan area in the U.S. as of the 2020 census.

== Geography ==
Slatedale is in northern Lehigh County, west of the center of Washington Township. It is 3 miles (5 km) west of the borough of Slatington and 16 miles (26 km) northwest of Allentown, the county seat and the third most populous city in Pennsylvania. Both Slatedale and Slatington are named after the large amount of slate found in the area.

According to the U.S. Census Bureau, Slatedale has a total area of 0.3 square miles (0.8 km^{2}), of which 0.6 acres (2,464 m^{2}), or 0.32%, are water. Trout Creek forms the southern border of the community and flows east to the Lehigh River in Slatington. Blue Mountain rises 2 miles (3 km) to the north.

== Services ==
Slatedale is served by the Citizen's Fire Co #1 in Slatedale for fire protection and Northern Valley EMS for ambulance services. While it has its own box post office with the ZIP Code of 18079, surrounding areas use the Slatington ZIP Code of 18080.

Historical population
Census	Pop.	Note	%±
2000	389		—
2010	455		17.0%
