= Portrait of Bishop Bernardo de' Rossi =

1505 painting by Lorenzo Lotto

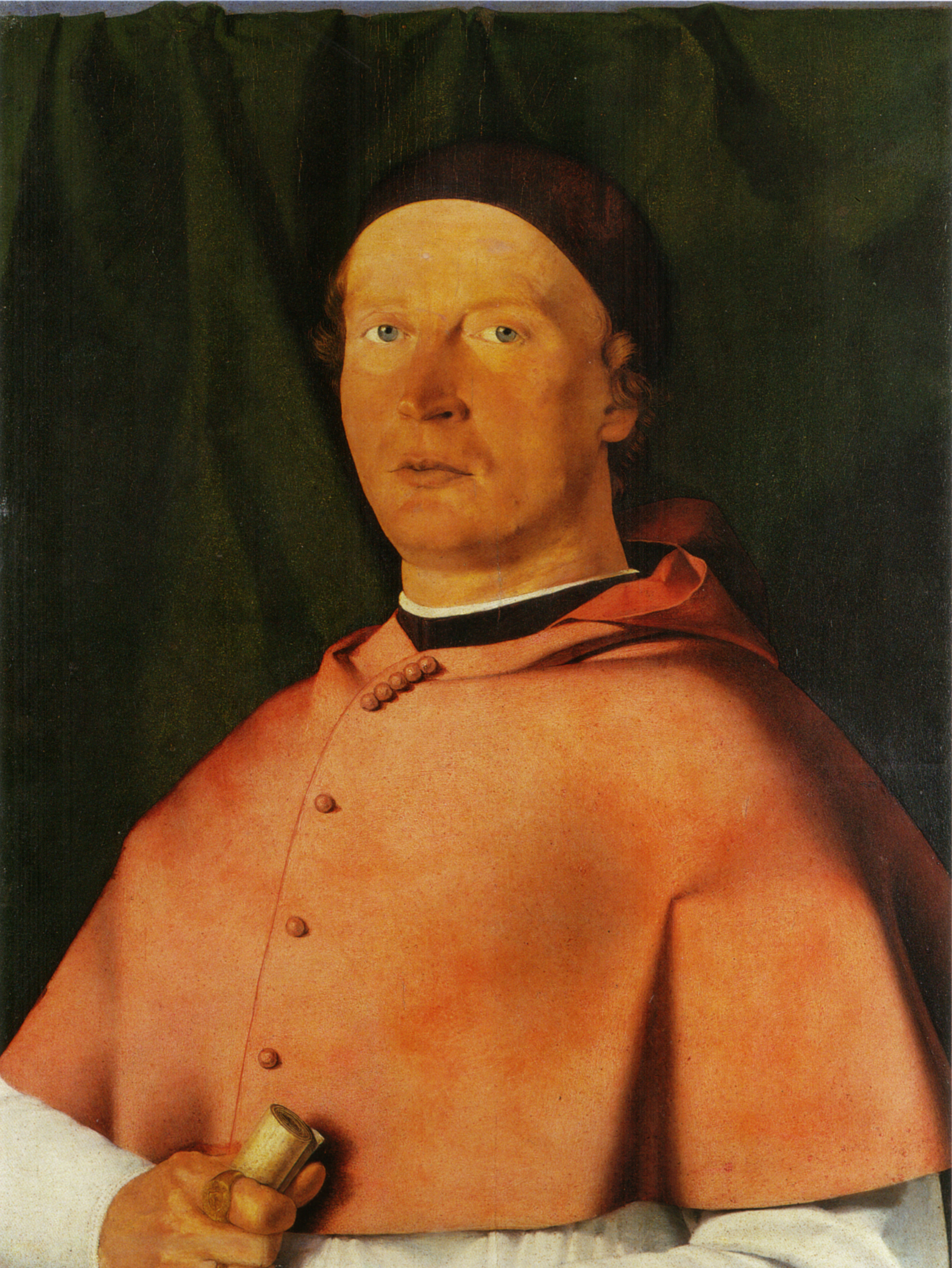
- Artist: Lorenzo Lotto
- Year: 1505
- Medium: Oil on panel
- Dimensions: 54.7 cm × 41.3 cm (21.5 in × 16.3 in)
- Location: National Museum of Capodimonte, Naples

The Portrait of Bishop Bernardo de' Rossi is an oil-on-panel painting by the Italian High Renaissance painter Lorenzo Lotto, dating to 1505. It is housed in the National Museum of Capodimonte of Naples, southern Italy.

The work dates to Lotto's stay in Treviso, and featured a cover with title, signature and dates, identified as the Allegory of Virtues and Vices now at the National Gallery of Art in Washington, United States. The portrait was brought to Parma by Bernardo de' Rossi when he fled there in 1524. Here it became part of the Farnese collection, which was transferred to Naples in 1760.

== Description ==
The painting shows the donor's bust from three-quarters, the face looking at the viewer. As in other portraits by Lotto, the subject is portrayed with a striking realism, including the reddish complexion, the hollows under the eyes, the expressive blue eyes and the light epidermic imperfections. The curly hair is partially getting out from the black biretta. Such an attention to details was inspired by Antonello da Messina, in turn influenced by the Flemish art and perhaps directly by Northern European artists such as Albrecht Dürer, whose drawings could have been seen by Lotto

The red mantel is backed by a green embroidered drapery, a common element of Venetian painting of the period. The roll is perhaps an allusion to the sentence against the conjurers who had attempted to de Rossi's life two years before.

The Allegory has an inscription on its reverse which describes the portrait:

Inscription	English translation
BERNARD. RVBEVS	Bernardo Rossi
BERCETI COM. PONT	of Berceta, Papal Count [Bishop]
TARVIS. NAT.	of Treviso, age
ANN. XXXVI. MENS. X.D.V.	36 years, 10 months, 5 days,
LAVRENT.LOTVS P. CAL.	Painted by Lorenzo Lotto,
IVL. M.D.V.	July 1, 1505

== See also ==
- Allegory of Virtues and Vices (Lotto)
- Portrait of a Young Man with White Drape

== Sources ==
- Pirovano, Carlo (2002). Lotto. Milan: Electa.
