= Northern Lehigh High School =

Location
- 1 Bulldog Lane; Slatington, Pennsylvania 18080; United States; 40.7612°N 75.6128°W

Information
- Former name: Slatington High School
- Type: Public high school
- Established: 1981; 45 years ago
- School district: Northern Lehigh School District
- NCES School ID: 421767002818
- Principal: Lori Bali
- Staff: 35.70 (on an FTE basis)
- Grades: 9th–12th
- Enrollment: 502 (2024–2025)
- Student to teacher ratio: 14:06
- Campus type: Suburb: Large
- Colors: Navy and white
- Athletics conference: Colonial League
- Mascot: Bulldog
- Rivals: Palmerton Area High School, Northwestern Lehigh High School
- Newspaper: The Slate
- Yearbook: Reflections
- Assistant Principal: Nicole Del Gotto
- Website: www.nlsd.org/domain/8

Northern Lehigh High School is a public high school located in Slatington, Pennsylvania. The school is the high school in Northern Lehigh School District, and serves students in ninth through 12th grades from Slatington, Walnutport, and Washington Township in the Lehigh Valley region of eastern Pennsylvania attend the high school.

As of the 2024–25 school year, the school had an enrollment of 502 students, according to National Center for Education Statistics data.

Northern Lehigh High School competes in the District XI athletic division of the Pennsylvania Interscholastic Athletic Association and is a member of the Colonial League.

== History ==
Present-day Northern Lehigh High School was founded in 1890. Between 1890 and the opening of the present school in 1982, the school had three prior locations. In 2000, an addition to the present school was completed, adding a new library and art room.

Since its 1890 opening and prior to the opening of the present Northern Lehigh High School in 1982, the school was based at three other locations:

- Lincoln Building at Chestnut Alley and Kuntz Street (from 1890 to 1915)
- Old High School at Main Street at 2nd and Main streets (from 1916 to 1958)
- Northern Lehigh Middle School at the top of Kuehner Hill on Bulldog Lane (used as the high school from 1958 to 1981)
- Northern Lehigh High School at Bulldog Lane and Snyder Avenue (from 1982 to present)

Until 1981, when the school's name was changed to Northern Lehigh High School, it was known as Slatington High School.

== Academics ==
Northern Lehigh High School operates on a semester system. The school year has two semesters, each with four 80-minute class periods and a "Lunch and Learn" block in the middle of the day. Students are also offered the opportunity to take vocational training at Lehigh Career and Technical Institute and college courses offered through Lehigh Carbon Community College, both located in Schnecksville.

== Athletics ==
=== Rivals ===
Northern Lehigh's main sports rivalries are closely aligned with geographic proximity. Northern Lehigh and Palmerton High School have had a strong rivalry for decades. Between 1946 and 1974, both school's football teams met for a Thanksgiving Day game, and the teams still end their regular seasons each year by playing one another. A natural rivalry has also developed with Northwestern Lehigh High School, which was once a part of Northern Lehigh School District until the 1950s.

=== Teams ===
Northern Lehigh fields teams for interscholastic competition in a number of sports including, baseball, boys and girls cross country, boys and girls soccer, boys and girls track and field, field hockey, football, boys and girls basketball, wrestling, and softball.

=== PIAA state champions ===
Since its founding, Northern Lehigh High School has won PIAA state championships in the following sports and seasons:

- Softball: 1988 ("AA"), 96 ("AA")
- Wrestling: 1985 ("AA"), 2005 ("AA")

=== PIAA state qualifiers ===
Northern Lehigh High School has qualified for the PIAA state tournament in the following sports and years:

- Boys Basketball: 1982, 2007, 08, 12
- Girls Basketball: 1992, 93, 2010, 11
- Boys Cross Country: 1974, 78, 79, 80, 87, 89, 92, 94, 95, 97, 98, 99, 2001, 09
- Girls Cross Country: 1975, 85, 86, 2007
- Football: 1999, 2003, 10
- Softball:1988, 96, 98, 2000, 01
- Wrestling: 1985, 99, 2000, 05, 06, 08, 15

=== PIAA Eastern PA champions ===
- Boys Basketball: 1982
- Football: 2003
- Softball:1988, 96, 98
- Wrestling: 1999, 2000, 05, 06

=== Eastern Conference Playoff AA champions ===
- Football: 2014

=== District XI champions ===
Northern Lehigh High School has won PIAA District 11 championships in the following sports and seasons:

- Boys Basketball: 1954, 2008
- Baseball: 1954
- Boys Cross Country: 1980, 92, 95, 97, 99
- Girls Cross Country: 1975, 85
- Football: 1999, 2003, 2010, 2021, 2022
- Softball: 1993, 94, 96, 98, 00, 01, 19
- Wrestling: 1986, 97, 98, 99, 2000, 05, 06, 09, 15, 21, 22

=== Colonial League champions ===
Northern Lehigh High School joined the Colonial League in 1994. Their Colonial League championships since include:

- Baseball: 2010
- Boys Basketball: 2007, 08, 10
- Boys Cross Country: 1994, 95, 97, 99
- Field Hockey: 2013
- Football: 1999, 2002, 03, 05, 10
- Softball: 1994, 2010, 2018
- Boys Track: 1999, 2004
- Wrestling: 1997, 98, 99, 04, 05, 06

=== Centennial League champions ===
Northern Lehigh High School joined the Centennial League in 1975 and was in the league through the end of the 1993 season. Their Centennial championships during this period include:

- Baseball: 1984, 85, 86
- Boys Basketball: 1978, 81, 82, 83, 84, 85, 88
- Girls Basketball: 1984
- Boys Cross Country: 1977, 78, 79, 80, 81, 86, 87, 88, 89, 92, 93
- Girls Cross Country: 1985, 86, 87
- Football: 1981
- Softball:1988, 89, 92, 93, 94, 95
- Boys Track: 1978, 79, 81
- Wrestling: 1982, 83, 90

=== Lehigh Valley champions ===
- Boys Basketball: 1926, 27, 53, 54
- Baseball: 1939, 51, 53, 54
- Football: 1968, 69, 74
- Boys Track: 1966
- Girls Track: 1975

=== Ring of Honor ===
Beginning in 2007, each year, six individuals who have made a significant impact on athletics at either Northern Lehigh High School or Slatington High School. The honor has included former athletes, coaches, and members of the community who have made contributions to promote high school athletics.

=== Notable individual accomplishments ===
- On January 7, 2012, Northern Lehigh High School's Aimee Oertner achieved a quintuple double-double, a performance in which a player accumulates a double-digit number total in all five statistical categories, including points scored, rebounds, assists, steals, and blocked shots, in a single game. As of 2012, this feat had only been accomplished two other times in basketball history.
- On October 3, 2018, David Oertner earned his 1000th win as the head coach of Northern Lehigh High School's cross country team. As of 2018, Oertner had over 90 seasons of coaching as a head or assistant coach of various sports at Northern Lehigh High School.

== Arts ==
=== Marching Band ===
- Tournament of Bands Chapter II Champions (Group 1): 1999, 2006, 2007, 2009, 2017, 2018, 2019
- Tournament of Bands Atlantic Coast Championships Finalists: 1997, 98, 99, 2000, 03, 04, 05, 06, 07, 08, 09, 10, 11, 12, 13, 14, 15, 16, 17, 18, 19
- Tournament of Bands Top 5 Finish at Atlantic Coast Championships: 2011 – 4th of 30 group 1 bands; 2013 – 3rd of 23 bands; 2015 – 4th of 26 bands;2016 – 5th of 19 bands;2017-5th of 20 bands; 2018-4th of 20 bands; 2019-4th of 20 bands
- Tournament of Bands Chapter II High Percussion (Group 1): 1999, 2005, 2007, 2009
- Tournament of Bands ACC Section champions: 2013 Woodwinds

=== Freddy Awards ===
- Outstanding Performance by an Orchestra: 2011, Once On This Island
- Outstanding Use of Scenery: 2011, Once On This Island
- Outstanding Use of Scenery: 2013, Littler Shop of Horrors
- Outstanding Featured Performance by an Actor: 2014, Dirty Rotten Scoundrels
- Outstanding Featured Performance by an Actor-Won by Pierce McGowan:2017, Beauty and the Beast
- Outstanding Performance by a Male Ensemble Member-won by Pierce McGowan:2018, Sweeney Todd: The Demon Barber of Fleet Street
- Outstanding Overall Production By a SmallerSchool:2018, Sweeney Todd: The Demon Barber of Fleet Street

== NLHS alma mater ==
The lyrics to the song were written by Charles Schoffstall, a commercial teacher between 1917 and 1920. It is played to the tune of "Annie Lisle".

Lyrics: Just above the winding Lehigh,
Midst the mountains grand,
Stands our dear old Alma Mater
Famed throughout the land.

Far and wide through we may sojourn,
Still our hearts are true,
To our dear old alma mater,
Dear old white and blue

Chorus:
High school, high school, our own high school,
Dear N.L.H.S.
When afar from the we wander,
Thy dear name we bless.

== Former school mascots ==
- Early 1930s: Blue and White Warriors
- 1939 to 1941: Blue and White Raiders'
- 1941 to 1968: Slatington Slaters
- 1968 to 1981: Slatington Bulldogs

== Notable alumni ==
- Sigrid Elschot, professor, aeronautics and astronautics at Stanford University and recipient of the Presidential Early Career Award for Scientists and Engineers
- George Hennessey, former professional baseball player, Chicago Cubs, St. Louis Browns, and Philadelphia Phillies
- Charles Johnson, former professional baseball player, Philadelphia Phillies
- Thomas R. Morgan, former assistant commandant, U.S. Marine Corps
