= Allegory of Virtue and Vice (Lotto) =

Painting by Lorenzo Lotto

Allegory of Virtues and Vices
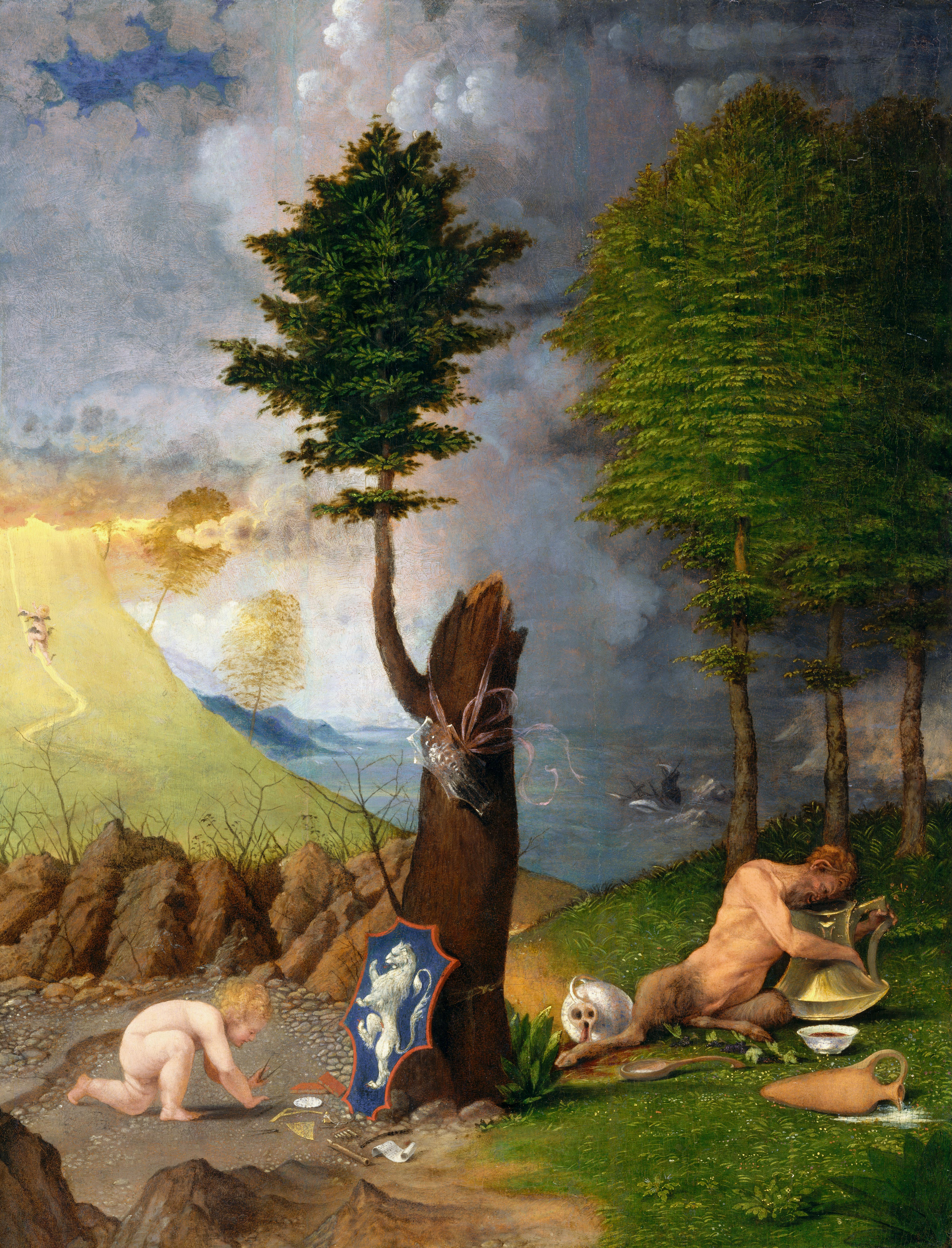
- Artist: Lorenzo Lotto
- Year: 1505
- Medium: Oil on panel
- Dimensions: 56.5 cm × 42.2 cm (22.2 in × 16.6 in)
- Location: National Gallery of Art, Washington, DC
- Accession: 1939.1.156

The Allegory of Virtue and Vice is an oil-on-panel painting by the Italian High Renaissance painter Lorenzo Lotto, dating to 1505. It is housed in the National Gallery of Art in Washington, DC, United States.

== History ==
The painting originally formed the protective cover of the Portrait of Bernardo de' Rossi, the bishop of Treviso who was Lotto's patron at the time. When it was opened to display the portrait, the inscription (on the reverse of the Allegory) would have been revealed:

Inscription	English translation
BERNARD. RVBEVS	Bernardo Rossi
BERCETI COM. PONT	of Berceta, Papal Count [Bishop]
TARVIS. NAT.	of Treviso, age
ANN. XXXVI. MENS. X.D.V.	36 years, 10 months, 5 days,
LAVRENT.LOTVS P. CAL.	Painted by Lorenzo Lotto,
IVL. M.D.V.	July 1, 1505

The painting was brought to Parma when de' Rossi fled Treviso, and there it became part of the Farnese collection, from which it was bought in 1803; after a series of different possessors, it arrived in the United States in 1935, and was donated to the current museum four years later.

== Description ==
The painting is an allegoric scene with the bishop's coat of arms lying on a tree in the center of the composition. The tree divides the latter in two parts corresponding to its two branches, one green and one dried. The former is associated to the allegory of Virtue, featuring a putto playing with books (a symbol of wisdom) and the symbols of the Liberal Arts.

The right half shows a drunk silenus, sleeping among the symbols of vice; to these, in the background, corresponds a valley with an easy access, but dark and including a forest, which is a symbol of getting lost without the divine light, as well as a boat sinking in a lake, a symbol of failure.

The theme is perhaps derived from an engraving by Albrecht Dürer, which also includes a similar tree with moral symbols.

== See also ==
- Portrait of Bishop Bernardo de' Rossi

== Sources ==
- Pirovano, Carlo (2002). Lotto. Milan: Electa.
