= Emerald, Pennsylvania =

Unincorporated community in Pennsylvania, U.S.

Coordinates: 40°44′42″N 75°38′05″W

Emerald is an unincorporated exurban community in Washington Township in Lehigh County, Pennsylvania. It is located two miles west of Slatington.

Emerald is part of the Lehigh Valley, which has a population of 861,899 and was the 68th-most populous metropolitan area in the U.S. as of the 2020 census.

Trout Creek flows eastward through it into the Lehigh River in Slatington. Interstate 476, the Northeast Extension of the Pennsylvania Turnpike, crosses the Franklin Slate Quarry on the eastern edge of Emerald. The immediate area is served by the Slatington post office with the ZIP Code of 18080.
