= Walnutport, Pennsylvania =

Borough in Pennsylvania, US

Borough of Walnutport
- Borough
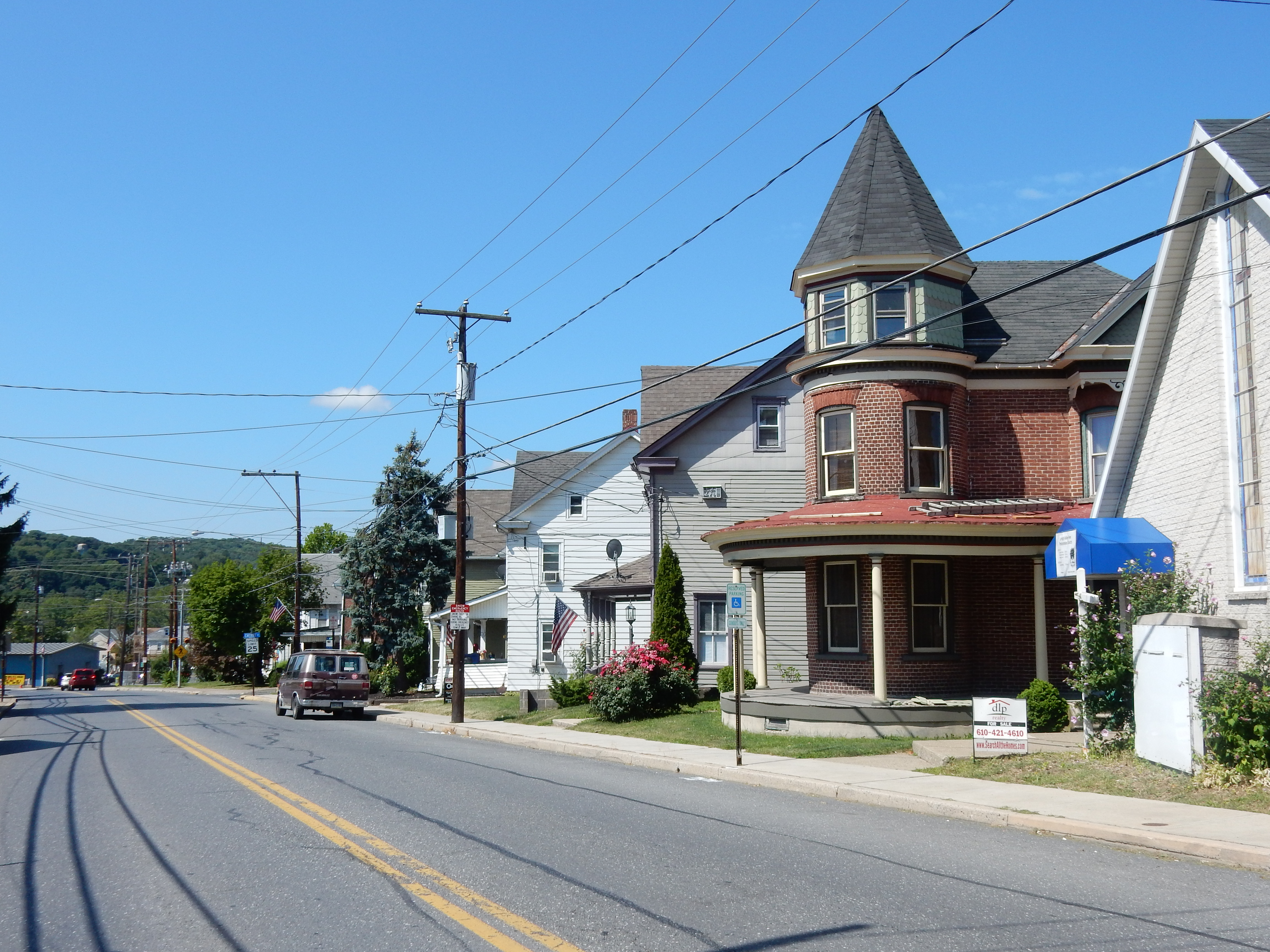
- Main Street in Walnutport, August 2015

- Location of Walnutport in Northampton County, Pennsylvania (left) and of Northampton County in Pennsylvania (right)

- Location of Walnutport in Pennsylvania Walnutport (the United States)
- Coordinates: 40°45′6″N 75°35′44″W
- Country: United States
- State: Pennsylvania
- County: Northampton
- Borough: 1989

Government
  - Mayor: Henry Kline

Area
  - Borough: 0.83 sq mi (2.14 km^{2})
  - Land: 0.75 sq mi (1.95 km^{2})
  - Water: 0.073 sq mi (0.19 km^{2})
- Elevation: 814 ft (248 m)

Population (2020)
  - Borough: 2,067
  - Density: 2,749.9/sq mi (1,061.75/km^{2})
  - Metro: 865,310 (US: 68th)
- Time zone: UTC-5 (EST)
  - Summer (DST): UTC-4 (EDT)
- ZIP Code: 18088
- Area codes: 610 and 484
- FIPS code: 42-80800
- Primary airport: Lehigh Valley International Airport
- Major hospital: Lehigh Valley Hospital–Cedar Crest
- School district: Northern Lehigh
- Website: www.walnutportpa.org

Walnutport is a borough in Northampton County, Pennsylvania. It was first incorporated in 1909. The population of Walnutport was 1,918 at the 2022 census.

Walnutport is located along the Lehigh River and is part of the Lehigh Valley metropolitan area, which had a population of 861,899 and was the 68th-most populous metropolitan area in the U.S. as of the 2020 census. The ZIP Code is 18088.

== Geography ==
Walnutport is located at 40°45′6″N 75°35′44″W (40.751554, -75.595574). According to the U.S. Census Bureau, the borough has a total area of 0.8 square miles (2.1 km^{2}), of which 0.8 square miles (1.9 km^{2}) is land and 0.1 square miles (0.2 km^{2}) (7.41%) is water.

Walnutport is located 20 miles (32 km) north of Bethlehem, 4 miles (6.4 km) south of Palmerton, 1 mile (1.6 km) east of Slatington, and 46 miles (74 km) south of Scranton, in the Wyoming Valley, which is also known as the Scranton/Wilkes-Barre metropolitan area.

Walnutport's elevation is at 814 feet (248 m) above sea level.

== Transportation ==
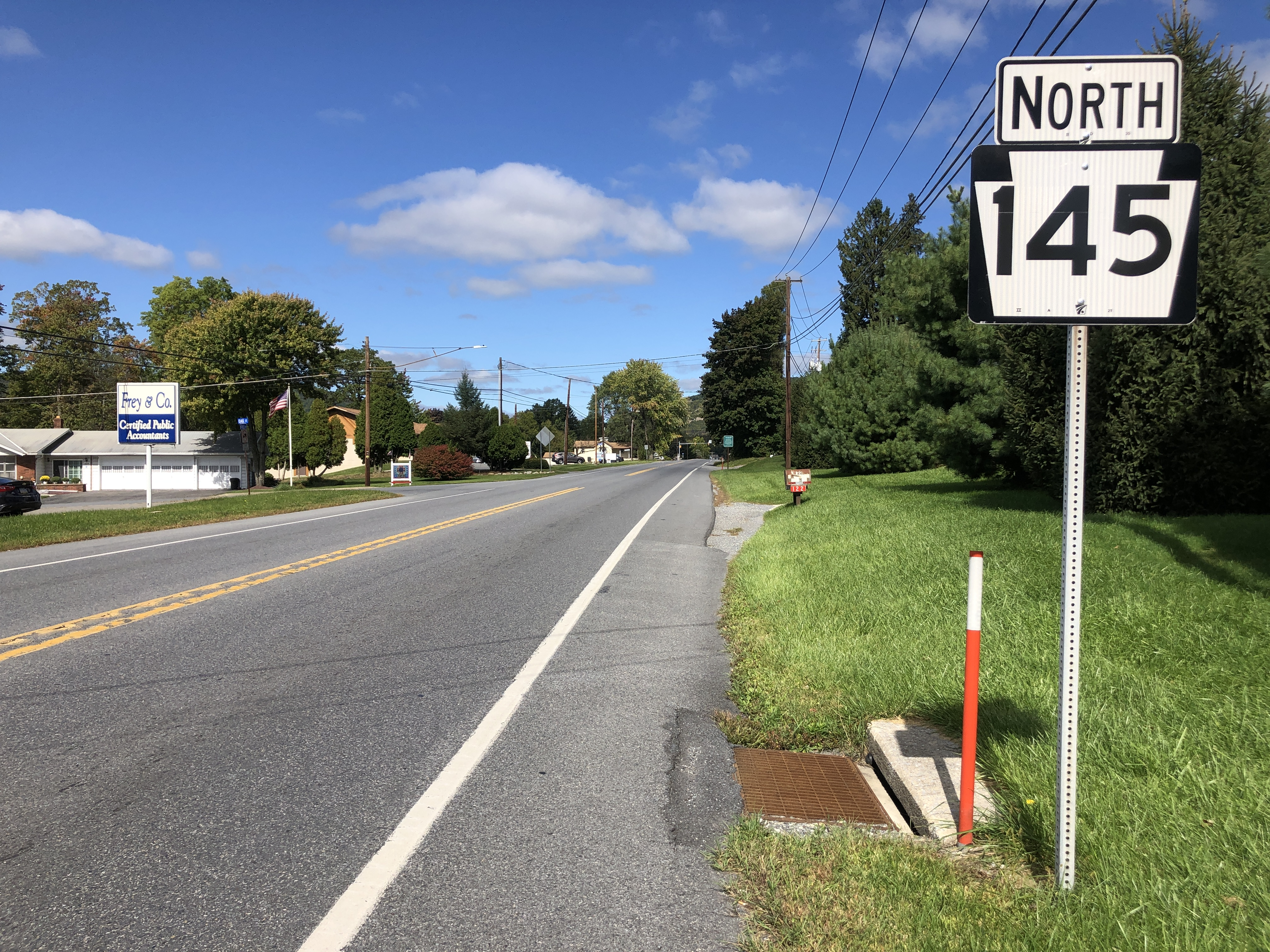
PA Route 145 North in Walnutport

As of 2009, there were 12.35 miles (19.88 km) of public roads in Walnutport, of which 2.08 miles (3.35 km) were maintained by the Pennsylvania Department of Transportation (PennDOT) and 10.27 miles (16.53 km) were maintained by the borough.

Pennsylvania Route 145 is the only numbered highway serving Walnutport; it follows Best Avenue on a north-south alignment along the eastern edge of the borough.

== Demographics ==
At the 2000 census, there were 2,043 people, 809 households, and 584 families residing in the borough. The population density was 2,727.6 inhabitants per square mile (1,053.1/km^{2}). There were 865 housing units at an average density of 1,154.8 per square mile (445.9/km^{2}). The racial makeup of the borough was 97.45% White, 0.39% African American, 0.34% Native American, 1.17% Asian, 0.39% from other races, and 0.24% from two or more races. Hispanic or Latino of any race were 1.52%.

Historical population
Census	Pop.	Note	%±
1910	1,039		—
1920	1,051		1.2%
1930	1,151		9.5%
1940	1,271		10.4%
1950	1,427		12.3%
1960	1,609		12.8%
1970	1,942		20.7%
1980	2,007		3.3%
1990	2,055		2.4%
2000	2,043		−0.6%
2010	2,070		1.3%
2020	2,067		−0.1%
U.S. Decennial Census

There were 809 households, 28.9% had children under the age of 18 living with them, 58.1% were married couples living together, 9.9% had a female householder with no husband present, and 27.7% were non-families. 23.1% of households were made up of individuals, and 11.7% were one person aged 65 or older. The average household size was 2.46 and the average family size was 2.88.

In the borough, the population was spread out, with 22.0% under the age of 18, 6.4% from 18 to 24, 29.6% from 25 to 44, 24.7% from 45 to 64, and 17.3% 65 or older. The median age was 40 years. For every 100 females there were 90.0 males. For every 100 females age 18 and over, there were 89.1 males. The median household income was $41,743 and the median family income was $44,844. Males had a median income of $35,729 versus $21,546 for females. The per capita income for the borough was $18,095. About 8.8% of families and 8.5% of the population were below the poverty line, including 11.5% of those under age 18 and 12.7% of those age 65 or over.

== Notable people ==
- Zach Mako, member, Pennsylvania House of Representatives
- Meredith Marakovits, sports reporter, YES Network
- Maury Schleicher, former professional football player, Los Angeles / San Diego Chargers
- Ted Wieand, former professional baseball player, Cincinnati Reds

== Education ==
The borough is served by the Northern Lehigh School District. Students in grades nine through 12 attend Northern Lehigh High School in Slatington.

== Gallery ==
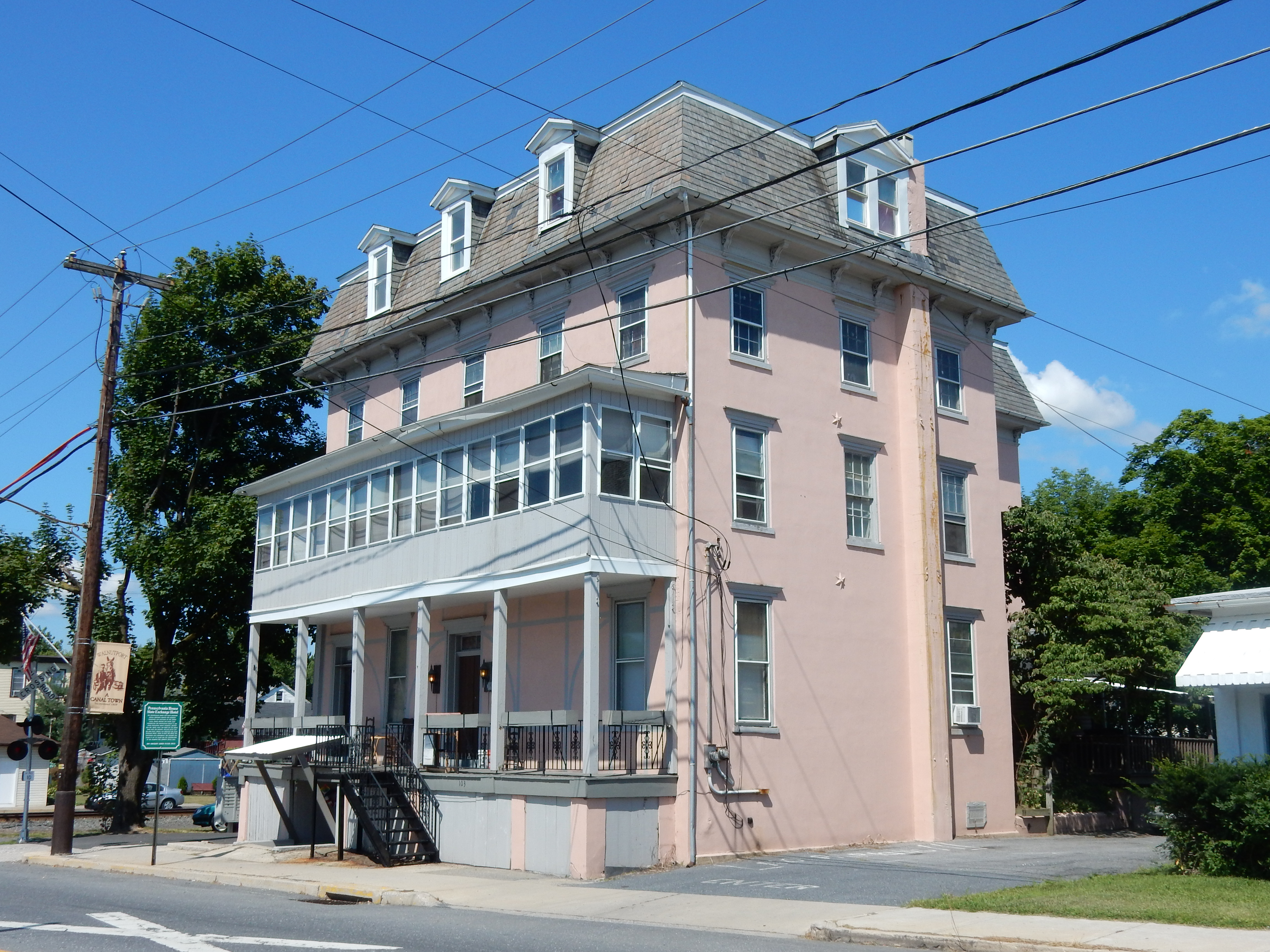
Presbyterian House

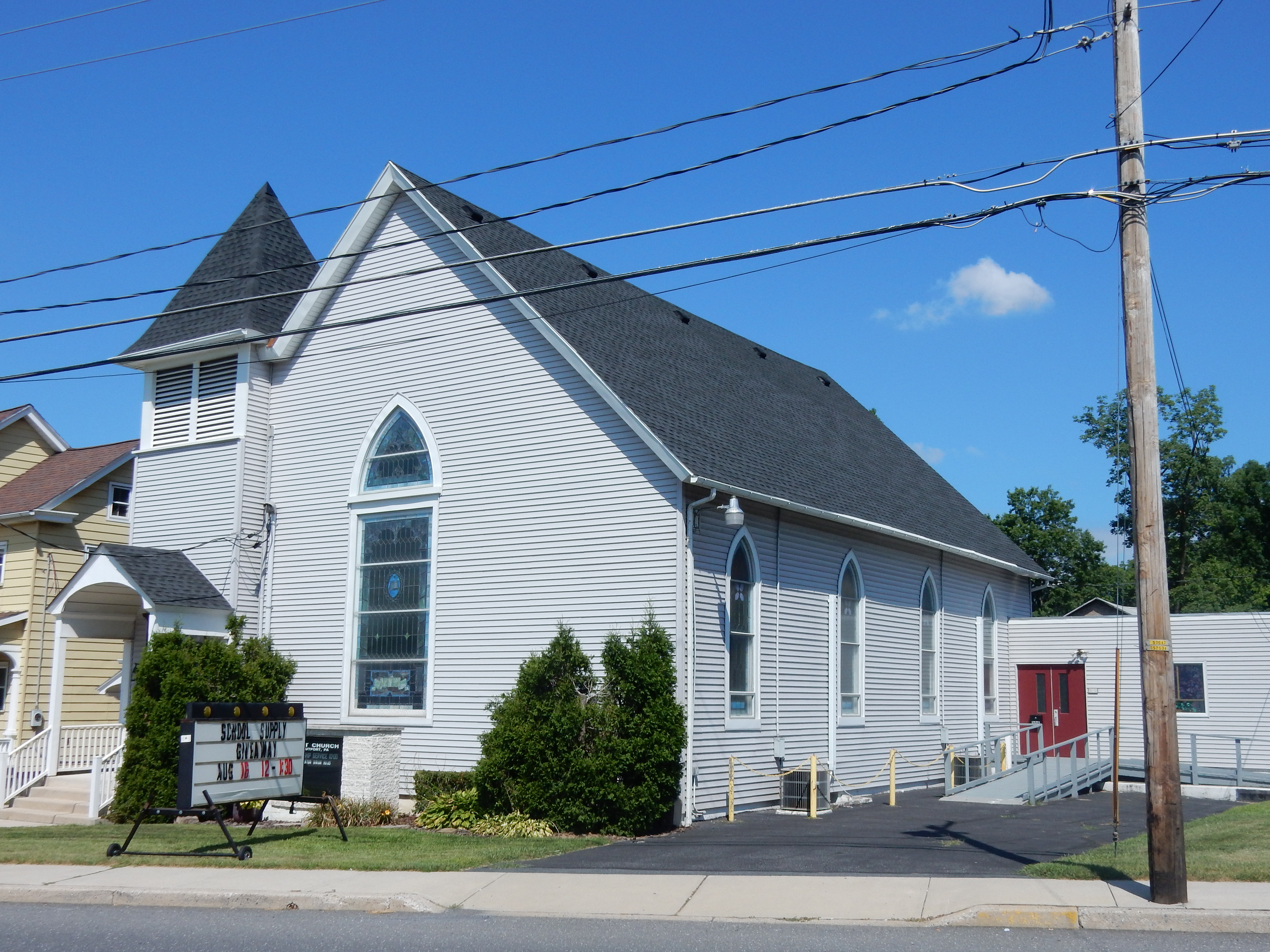
Christ Church UCC

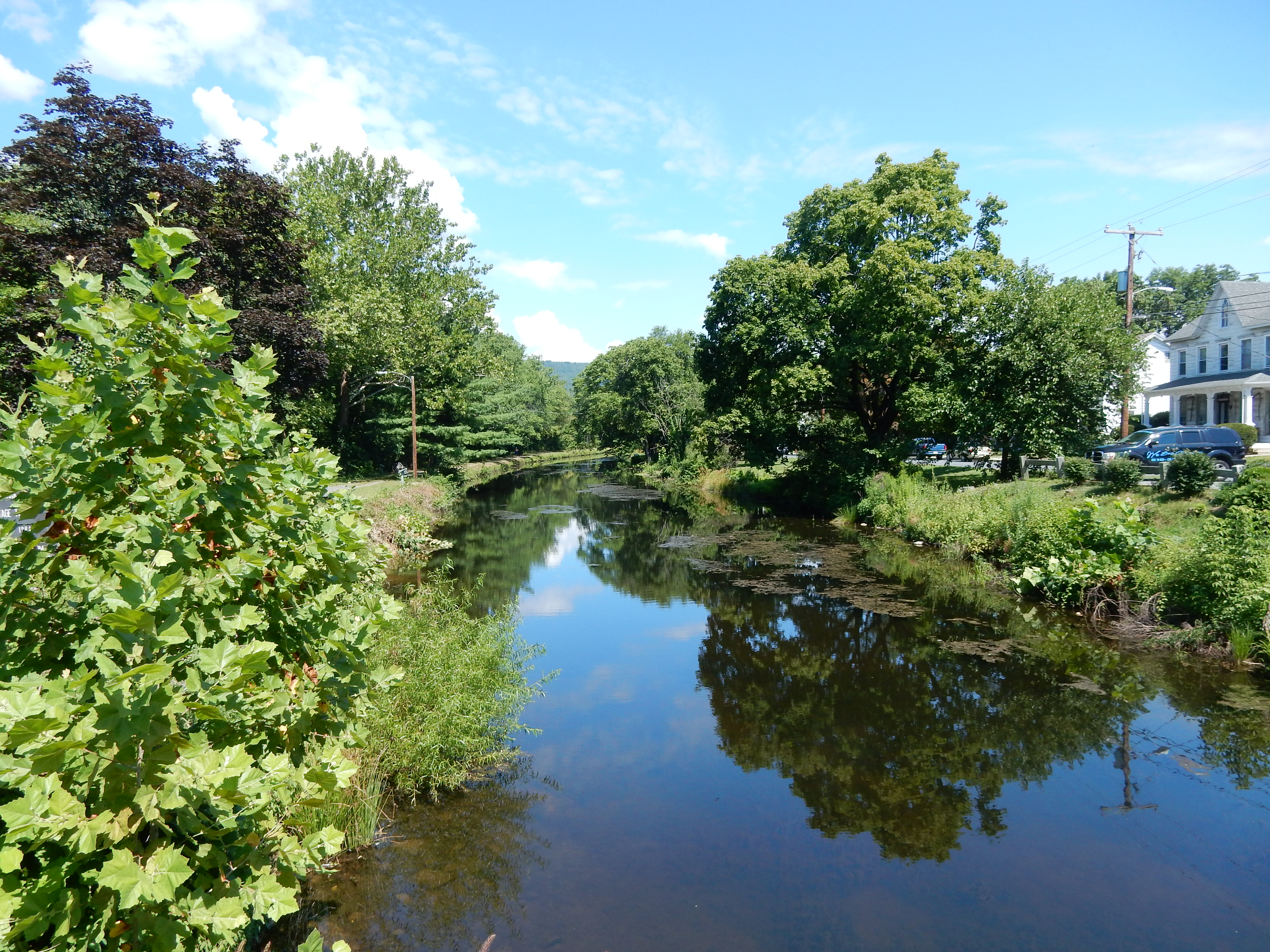
Lehigh Canal in Walnutport
