= Campus, Illinois =

- Village
- Location in Livingston County, Illinois
- Coordinates: 41°01′29″N 88°18′26″W
- Country: United States
- State: Illinois
- County: Livingston
- Townships: Round Grove, Broughton

Area
  - Total: 0.093 sq mi (0.24 km^{2})
  - Land: 0.093 sq mi (0.24 km^{2})
  - Water: 0 sq mi (0.00 km^{2})
- Elevation: 653 ft (199 m)

Population (2020)
  - Total: 149
  - Density: 1,616.0/sq mi (623.94/km^{2})
- Time zone: UTC-6 (CST)
  - Summer (DST): UTC-5 (CDT)
- Postal code: 60920
- Area code: 815
- FIPS code: 17-10916
- GNIS feature ID: 2397545

Campus is a village in Round Grove and Broughton townships, Livingston County, Illinois. The population was 149 at the 2020 census.

== History ==
Campus was laid out and platted by Charles William Sheldon (1839–1911) in April 1880, along the Wabash Railroad on his farm of 640 acres (260 ha). The town was named "Campus" because the many trees were reminiscent of a college campus.

Sheldon was a farmer and he owned the first business in town, Campus Brick & Tile Co. He later sold the company, which passed through several owners before closing in 1952. Over the years the tile company produced millions of feet of drain tile and was one of the principal industries in the town.

Thomas Feehery (1839–1926) built the first store and post office in Campus. The Chariton brothers built the second store in town. In 1896, the first hotel was built. Other businesses at that time included Ole Nelson and Thomas Connors' livery stable.

Campus had a water system by 1894. The town also had street lights, cement sidewalks, an electric light plant and tile drains, which were great improvements for such an isolated rural town in those early years.

The town had a disastrous fire in 1897 that destroyed three of the business houses. A brick building was built on the ruins.

Sacred Heart Catholic Church was the first brick structure in the village. The Catholic Church had its start in the area in the 1870s when a small church was built in Broughton Township a mile south of Campus. The building was later moved into town. Joseph Zeller (1918–2018), Pennsylvania businessman and state legislator, was born in Campus.

The present brick building on Elm Street was begun in June 1983 and completed a year later. A rectory was built next to the church. A convent school was built in 1898 on the other side of Elm Street. The school closed in 1930 and was vacant for several years. It later served as a vocation center and home for priests.

By the 1970s the former school building had become a rooming house and laundromat. The beautiful building later became vacant and in disrepair.

In 2024 the village was awarded $1.3 million from the USDA and U.S. Representative Robin Kelly for water system improvements.

== Geography ==
Campus is located in northeastern Livingston County. Most of the village is in Round Grove Township, but four blocks of the village are in Broughton Township to the south. Campus is 11 miles (18 km) by road southeast of Dwight.

According to the 2021 census gazetteer files, Campus has a total area of 0.09 square miles (0.23 km^{2}), all land.

== Demographics ==
Historical population
Census	Pop.	Note	%±
1900	226		—
1910	241		6.6%
1920	228		−5.4%
1930	160		−29.8%
1940	169		5.6%
1950	183		8.3%
1960	165		−9.8%
1970	217		31.5%
1980	224		3.2%
1990	137		−38.8%
2000	145		5.8%
2010	166		14.5%
2020	149		−10.2%
U.S. Decennial Census

As of the 2020 census there were 149 people, 50 households, and 35 families residing in the village. The population density was 1,619.57 inhabitants per square mile (625.32/km^{2}). There were 66 housing units at an average density of 717.39 per square mile (276.99/km^{2}). The racial makeup of the village was 86.58% White, 0.00% African American, 0.67% Native American, 0.67% Asian, 0.00% Pacific Islander, 1.34% from other races, and 10.74% from two or more races. Hispanic or Latino of any race were 5.37% of the population.

There were 50 households, out of which 32.0% had children under the age of 18 living with them, 58.00% were married couples living together, 12.00% had a female householder with no husband present, and 30.00% were non-families. 26.00% of all households were made up of individuals, and 4.00% had someone living alone who was 65 years of age or older. The average household size was 2.80 and the average family size was 2.44.

The village's age distribution consisted of 22.1% under the age of 18, 0.0% from 18 to 24, 32.8% from 25 to 44, 32% from 45 to 64, and 13.1% who were 65 years of age or older. The median age was 41.5 years. For every 100 females, there were 106.8 males. For every 100 females age 18 and over, there were 93.9 males.

The median income for a household in the village was $81,250, and the median income for a family was $96,250. Males had a median income of $76,875 versus $51,750 for females. The per capita income for the village was $35,320. About 8.6% of families and 10.1% of the population were below the poverty line, including 12.5% of those under age 18 and 0.0% of those age 65 or over.
