= Slater =

Occupation

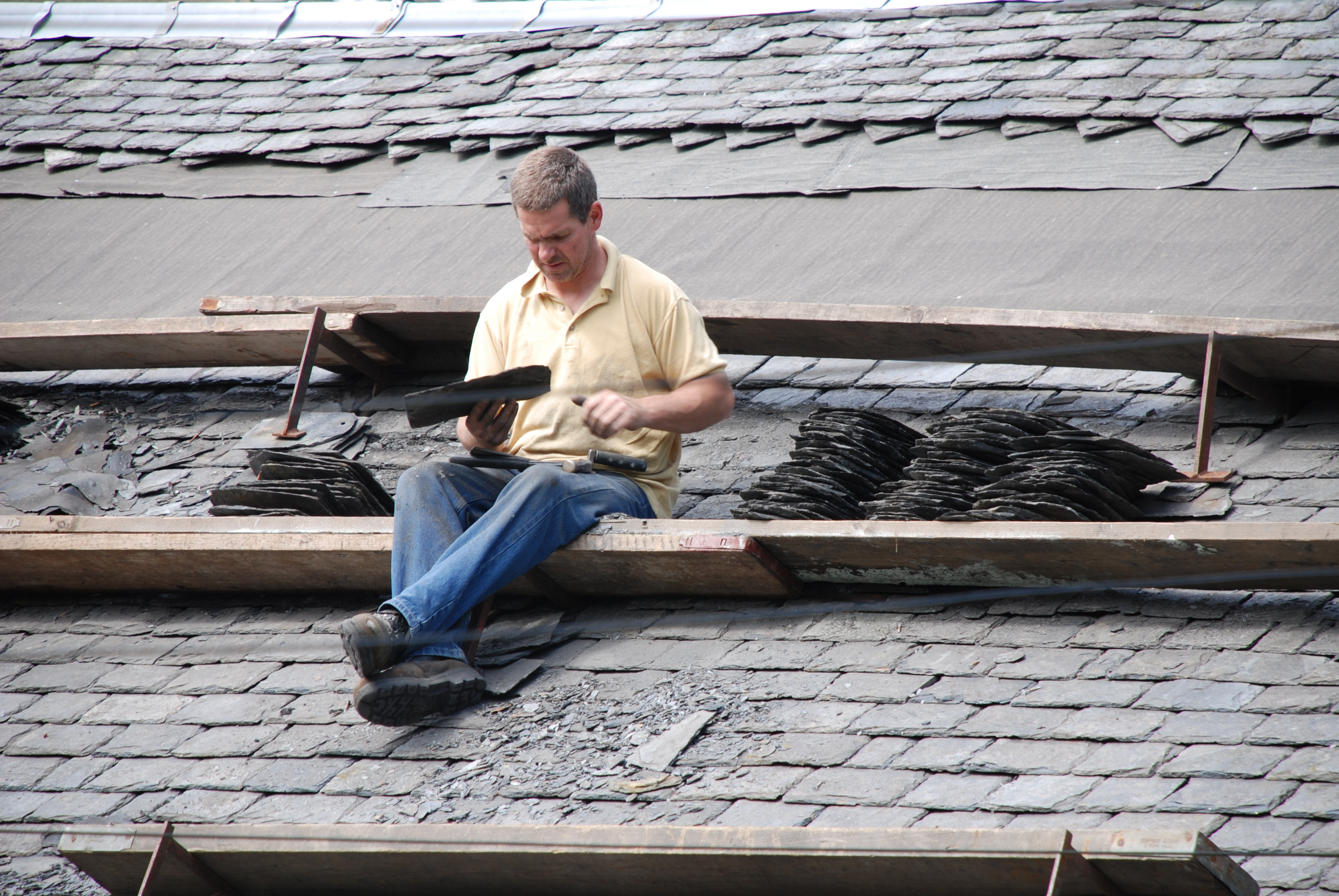
Slater working on a roof

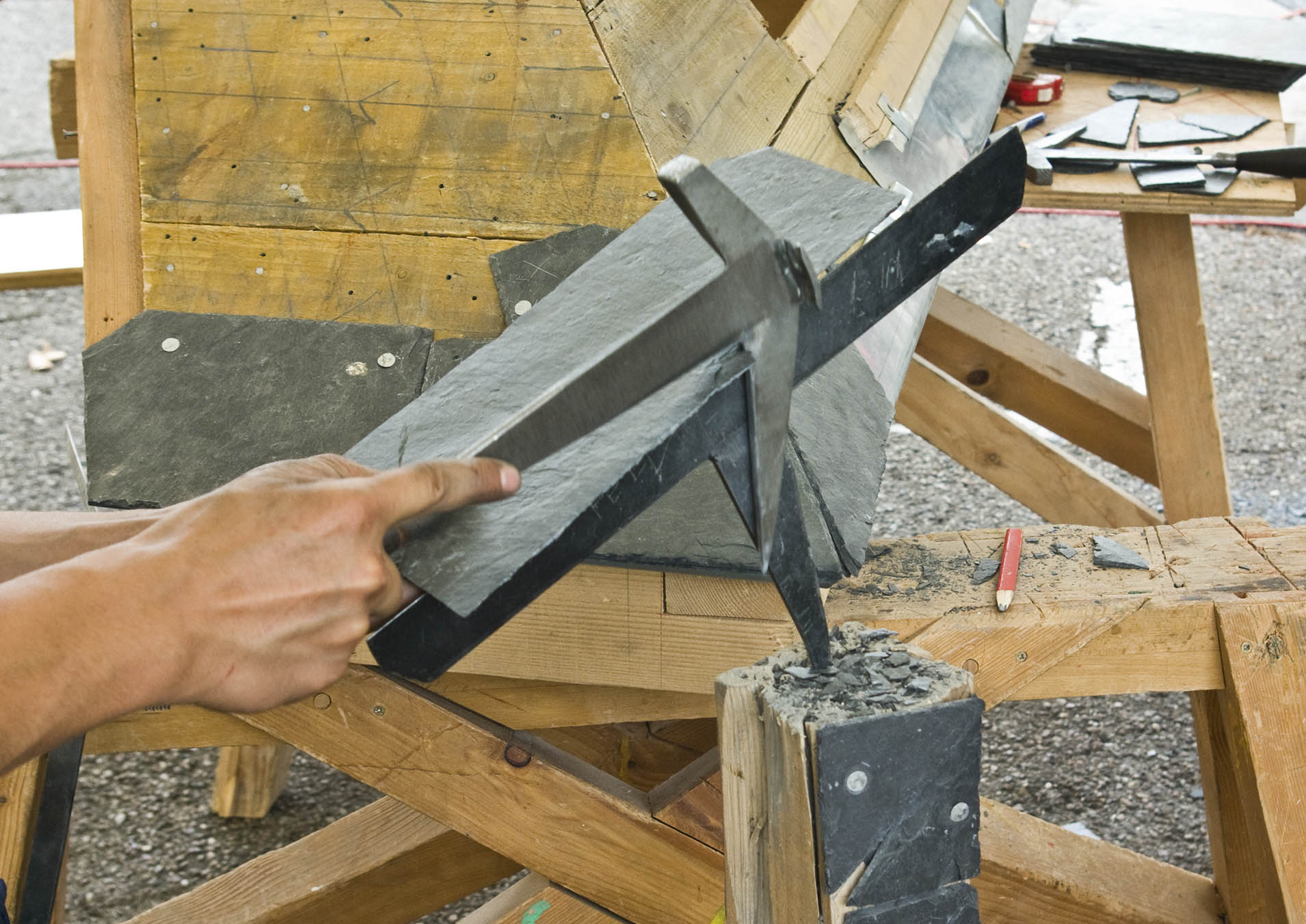
Cutting a slate with a slater's hammer on a slater's stake

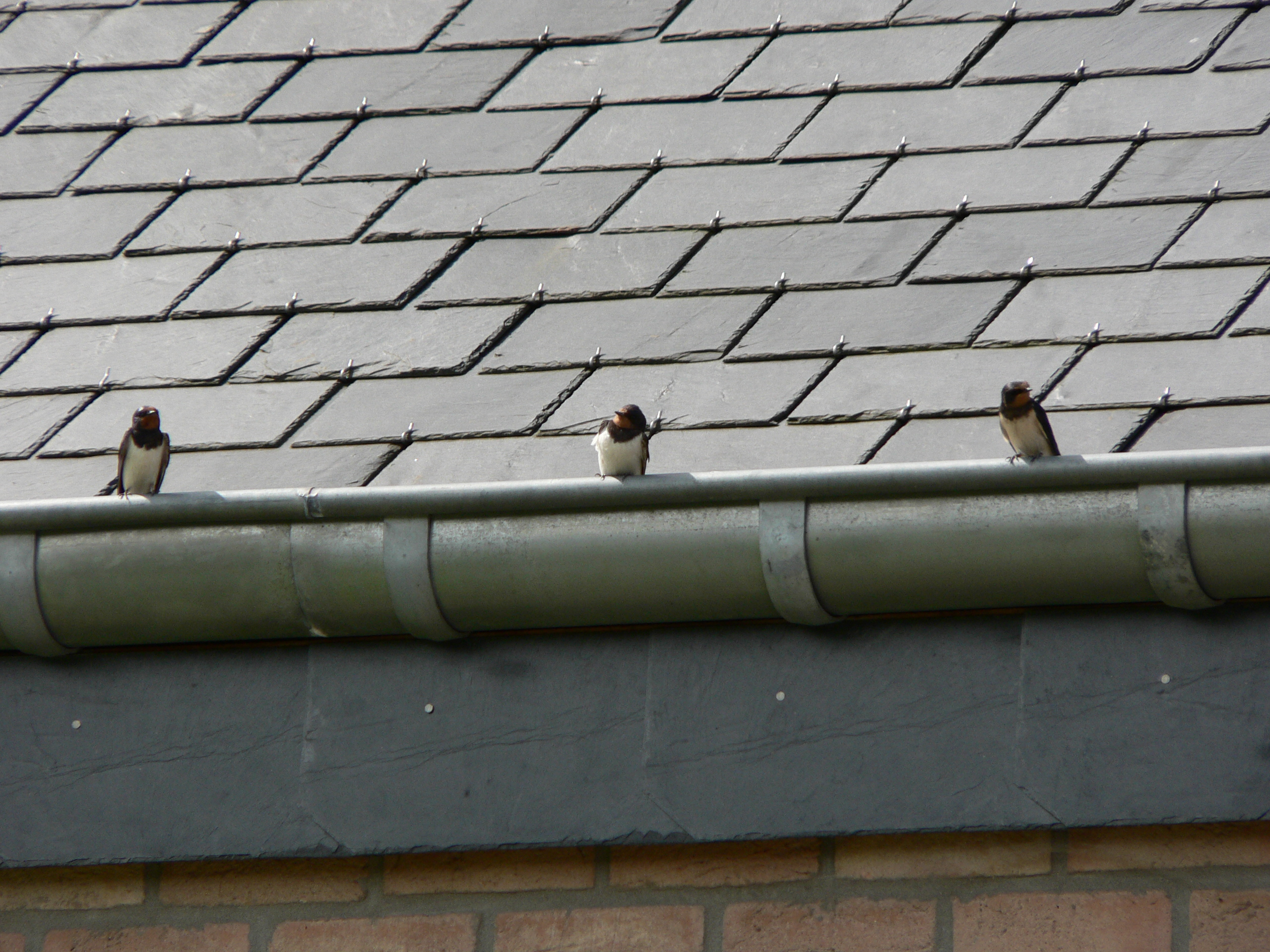
A slate roof

A slater, or slate mason, is a tradesperson who covers buildings with slate.

A slater could also be a person who mines the slate, such as in the Slate Belt of rural eastern Pennsylvania. Slate Belt - Wikipedia "Slater" is also the mascot of the Bangor Area High School sports teams in the heart of the Slate Belt.

== Tools ==
The various tools of the slater's trade are all drop-forged.

The slater's hammer is forged in one single piece, from crucible-cast steel, and has a 12-inch (30 cm) leather handle. It consists of a claw for drawing nails, a sheer edge for cutting slate, and a head with a sharp point at one end for punching holes in slate and with a hammer head at the other.

The ripper is also forged from crucible-cast steel and is 24 inches (60 cm) long. It consists of a blade and a hook, and is used for removing broken slate. The hook can be used to cut and remove slating nails.

The slater's stake is T-shaped. The vertical bar of the "T" is pointed to allow it to be driven into a rafter or other woodworking surface. The horizontal bar of the "T" is used to support slates whilst working on them (cutting, punching, or smoothing) with other tools. The long bar of the stake can also be used as a straight edge for marking.

The zax (also called a sack or sax) is a hand tool for cutting, trimming, and punching nail holes in slate. It consists of a heavy rectangular knife blade with a large point, of square cross section, protruding from the poll (or butt). The blade edge is used to split slate, while the point is used to pierce square holes for mounting the slate on the roof (with square copper nails) or making a series of small holes marking a line where the slate is broken over a slater's iron.
