= Tokita =

Tokita (written: 時田, 鴇田, 常田, 土岐田 or ときた in hiragana) is a Japanese surname. Notable people with the surname include:

- Hiroko Tokita (ときた ひろこ, born 1956), Japanese anime director
- Kamekichi Tokita (1897–1948), Japanese-American painter and writer
- Kohei Tokita (土岐田 洸平, born 1986), Japanese footballer
- Kōichi Tokita (ときた 洸一, born 1961), Japanese manga artist
- Masanori Tokita (鴇田 正憲, 1925–2004), Japanese footballer
- Reiko Tokita (土岐田 麗子, born 1984), Japanese model and television personality
- Ryo Tokita, Japanese artist
- Shintarō Tokita (常田 真太郎, born 1978), Japanese musician
- Shusaku Tokita (鴇田 周作, born 1990), Japanese footballer
- Takashi Tokita (時田 貴司, born 1965), Japanese video game developer
