= Wind Gap, Pennsylvania =

Borough in Pennsylvania, US

Wind Gap, Pennsylvania Gratdaal
- Borough
- Borough of Wind Gap
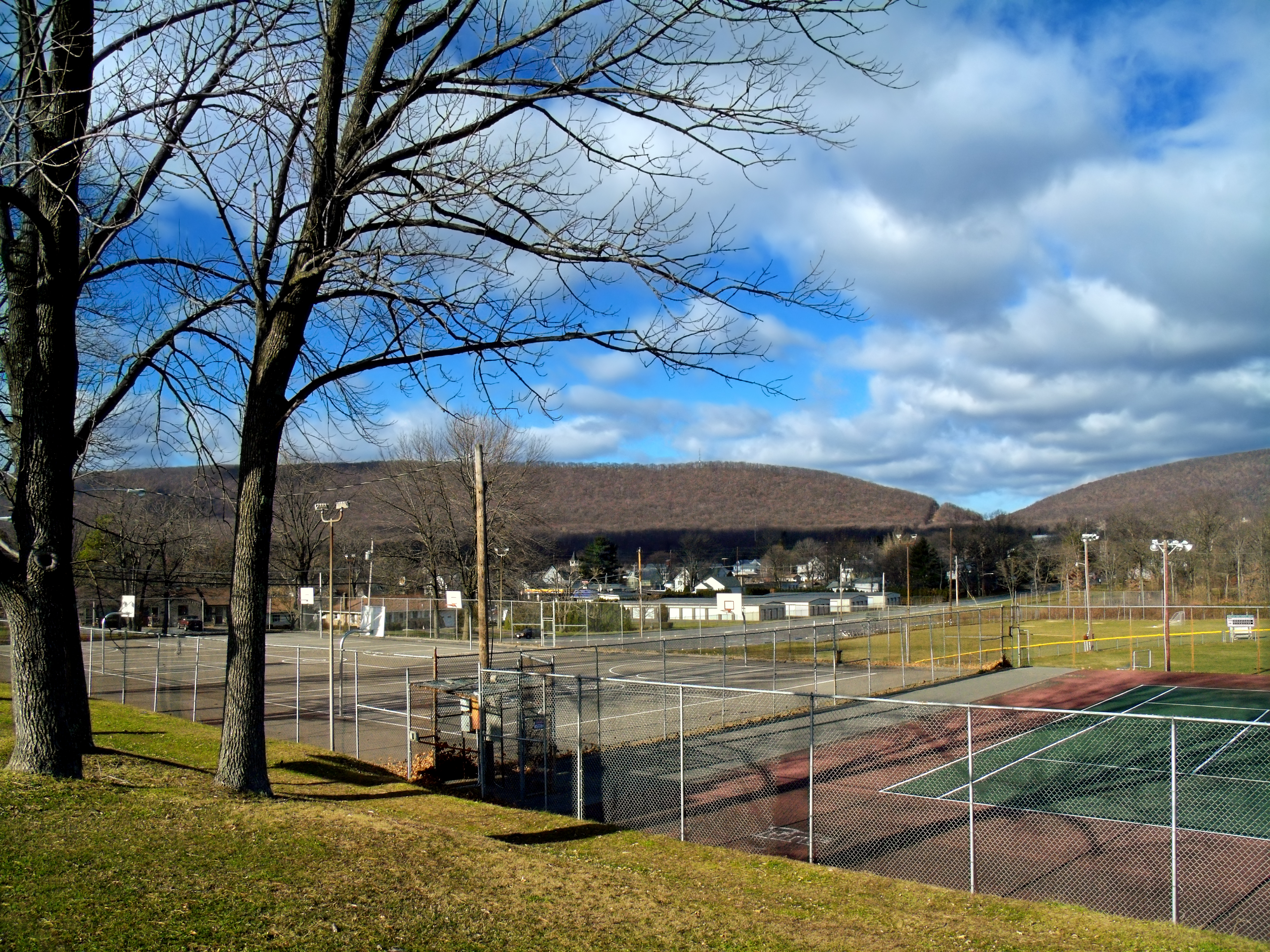
- Wind Gap in December 2010

- Location of Wind Gap in Northampton County, Pennsylvania (left) and of Northampton County in Pennsylvania

- Location of Wind Gap in Pennsylvania Wind Gap (the United States)
- Coordinates: 40°50′47″N 75°17′30″W
- Country: United States
- State: Pennsylvania
- County: Northampton
- Founded: 1893

Government
  - Mayor: Heather Webber

Area
  - Borough: 1.37 sq mi (3.54 km^{2})
  - Land: 1.34 sq mi (3.47 km^{2})
  - Water: 0.031 sq mi (0.08 km^{2})
- Elevation: 755 ft (230 m)

Population (2020)
  - Borough: 2,820
  - Density: 2,106.6/sq mi (813.36/km^{2})
  - Metro: 865,310 (US: 68th)
- Time zone: UTC-5 (EST)
  - Summer (DST): UTC-4 (EDT)
- ZIP Code: 18091
- Area code: 610
- FIPS code: 42-85664
- Primary airport: Lehigh Valley International Airport
- Major hospital: Lehigh Valley Hospital–Cedar Crest
- School district: Pen Argyl Area
- Website: windgap-pa.gov

Wind Gap (Pennsylvania Dutch: Gratdaal) is a borough in Northampton County, Pennsylvania, United States. The population of Wind Gap was 2,820 at the 2020 census. Wind Gap is part of the Lehigh Valley metropolitan area, which had a population of 861,899 and was the 68th-most populous metropolitan area in the U.S. as of the 2020 census.

== Geography ==
Wind Gap is located at 40°50′47″N 75°17′30″W (40.846429, -75.291631). According to the U.S. Census Bureau, the borough has a total area of 1.4 square miles (3.6 km^{2}), of which 0.73% is water.

Wind Gap is located 21 miles (34 km) north of Allentown in the Lehigh Valley and 50 miles (80 km) southeast of Scranton, in the Wyoming Valley, or the Scranton/Wilkes-Barre metropolitan area. Wind Gap's elevation is 755 feet (230 m) above sea level.

== Demographics ==
Historical population
Census	Pop.	Note	%±
1900	711		—
1910	832		17.0%
1920	1,133		36.2%
1930	1,388		22.5%
1940	1,377		−0.8%
1950	1,577		14.5%
1960	1,930		22.4%
1970	2,270		17.6%
1980	2,651		16.8%
1990	2,741		3.4%
2000	2,812		2.6%
2010	2,720		−3.3%
2020	2,820		3.7%
U.S. Decennial Census

As of the census of 2000, there were 2,812 people, 1,221 households, and 765 families residing in the borough. The population density was 2,061.8 inhabitants per square mile (796.1/km^{2}). There were 1,294 housing units at an average density of 948.8 per square mile (366.3/km^{2}). The racial makeup of the borough was 97.62% White, 0.46% African American, 0.04% Native American, 0.68% Asian, 0.53% from other races, and 0.68% from two or more races. Hispanic or Latino of any race were 1.60% of the population.

There were 1,221 households, out of which 26.6% had children under the age of 18 living with them, 49.4% were married couples living together, 10.2% had a female householder with no husband present, and 37.3% were non-families. 30.9% of all households were made up of individuals, and 13.4% had someone living alone who was 65 years of age or older. The average household size was 2.25 and the average family size was 2.84.

In the borough, the population was spread out, with 20.8% under the age of 18, 7.5% from 18 to 24, 29.6% from 25 to 44, 22.8% from 45 to 64, and 19.2% who were 65 years of age or older. The median age was 39 years. For every 100 females there were 88.6 males. For every 100 females age 18 and over, there were 84.6 males. The median income for a household in the borough was $35,030, and the median income for a family was $46,681. Males had a median income of $36,735 versus $22,700 for females. The per capita income for the borough was $21,239. About 7.2% of families and 11.9% of the population were below the poverty line, including 20.3% of those under age 18 and 9.8% of those age 65 or over.

== Transportation ==
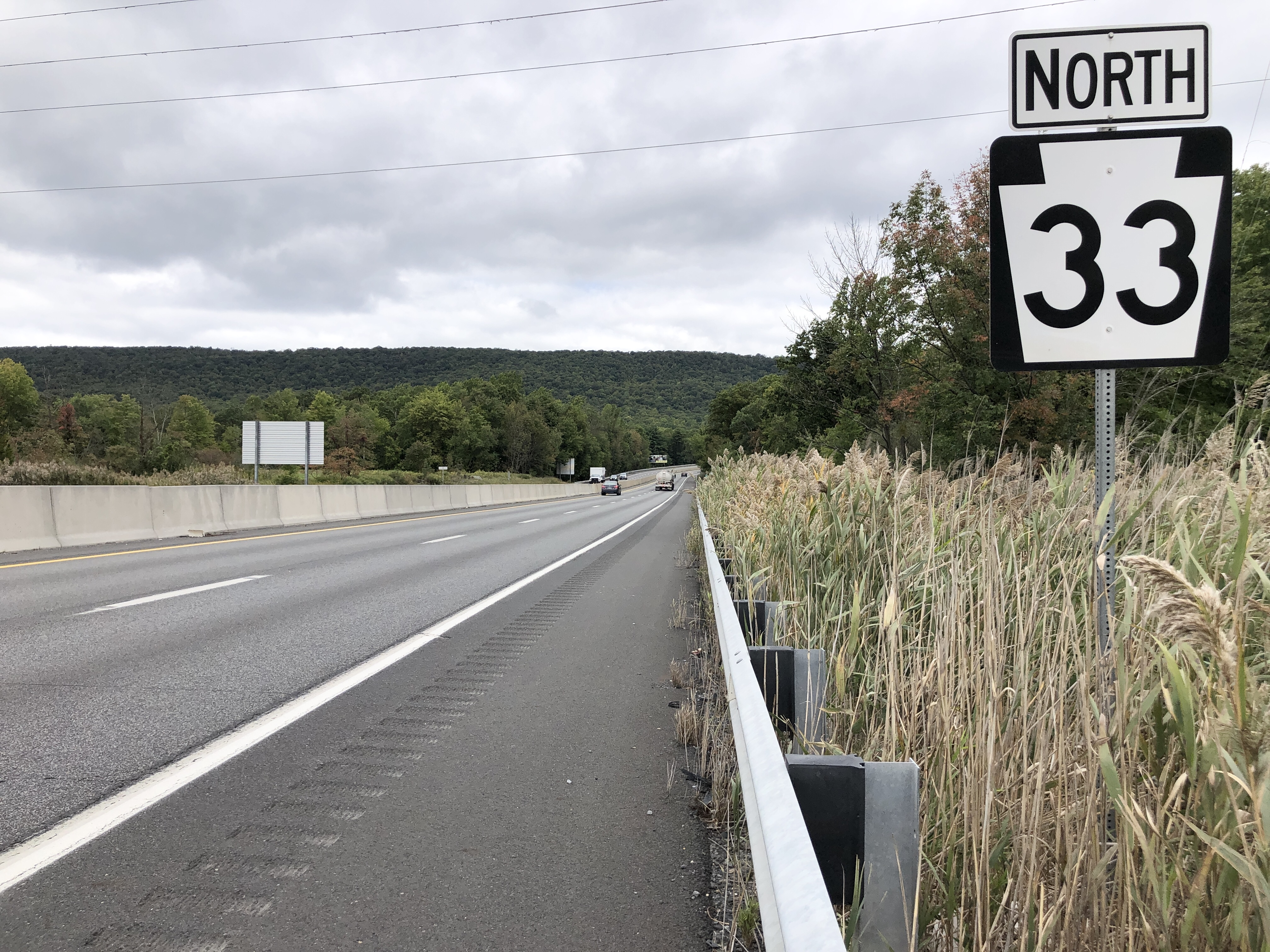
PA Route 33 North in Wind Gap

As of 2010, there were 13.45 miles (21.65 km) of public roads in Wind Gap, of which 3.67 miles (5.91 km) were maintained by the Pennsylvania Department of Transportation (PennDOT) and 9.78 miles (15.74 km) were maintained by the borough.

Pennsylvania Route 33 and Pennsylvania Route 512 are the numbered highways passing through Wind Gap. PA 33 follows a north–south alignment across the southwestern corner of the borough. It has an interchange with PA 512 just southwest of the borough in Plainfield Township. PA 512 follows Broadway and Lehigh Avenue along a southwest–northeast alignment through the center of the borough.

The Appalachian Trail cuts across the extreme northern end of the borough.

== Education ==
The borough is served by the Pen Argyl Area School District. Students in grades nine through 12 attend Pen Argyl Area High School in Pen Argyl.
