= Slatington Historic District =

Historic district in Pennsylvania, United States

- U.S. National Register of Historic Places
- U.S. Historic district
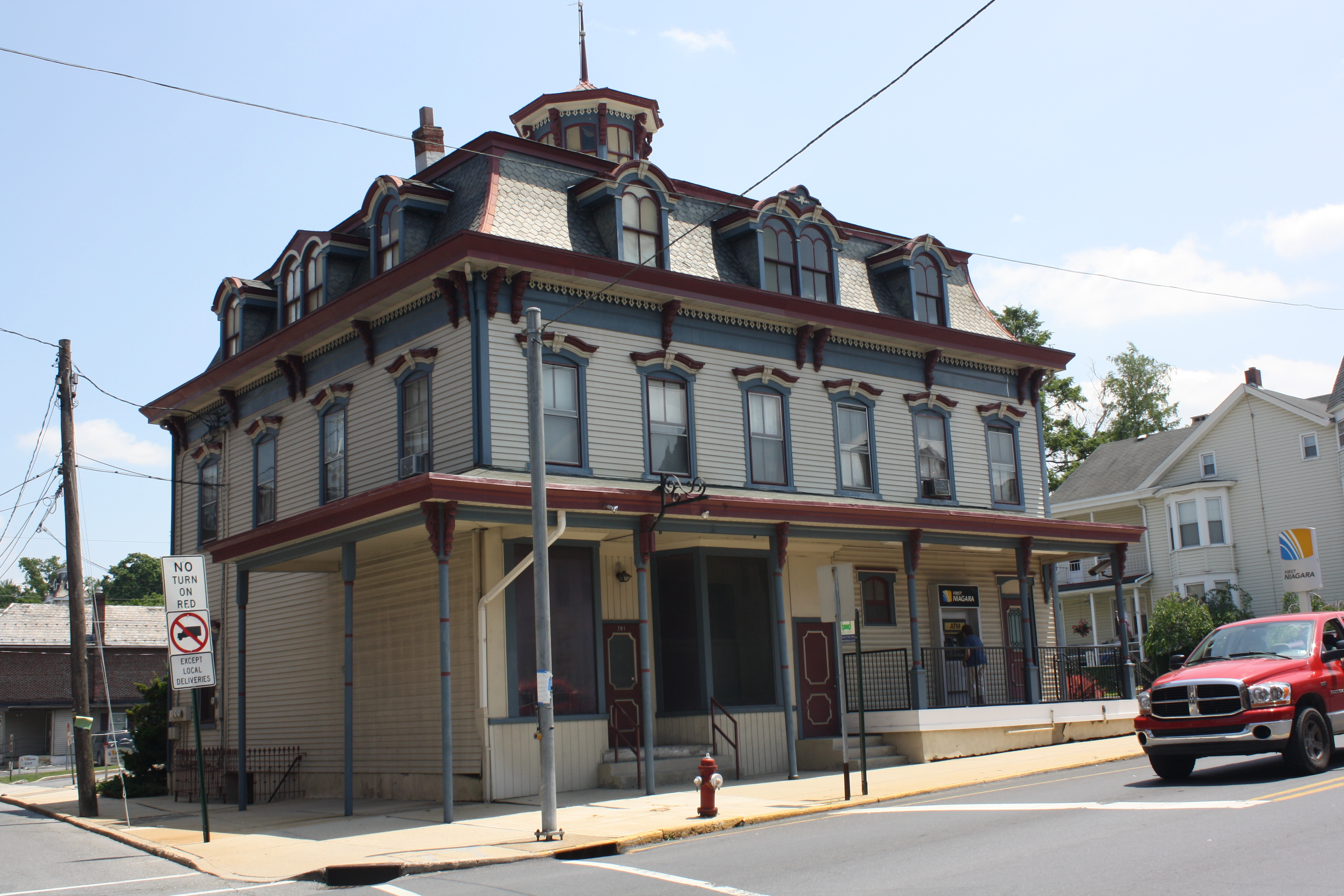
- 751 Main St., Slatington, Pennsylvania

- Location within Pennsylvania Location within the United States
- Location: Roughly bounded by Ridge Alley, Chestnut St., Railroad St., Kern St., Hill Alley, 5th St. and Dowell, Slatington, Pennsylvania
- Coordinates: 40°44′54″N 75°36′43″W
- Area: 0 acres (0 ha)
- NRHP reference No.: 04000839
- Added to NRHP: August 11, 2004

Slatington Historic District is a national historic district located at Slatington, Lehigh County, Pennsylvania. The district includes 506 contributing buildings and 2 contributing sites in the central business district and surrounding residential areas of Slatington.

It was added to the National Register of Historic Places in 2004.

== Gallery ==
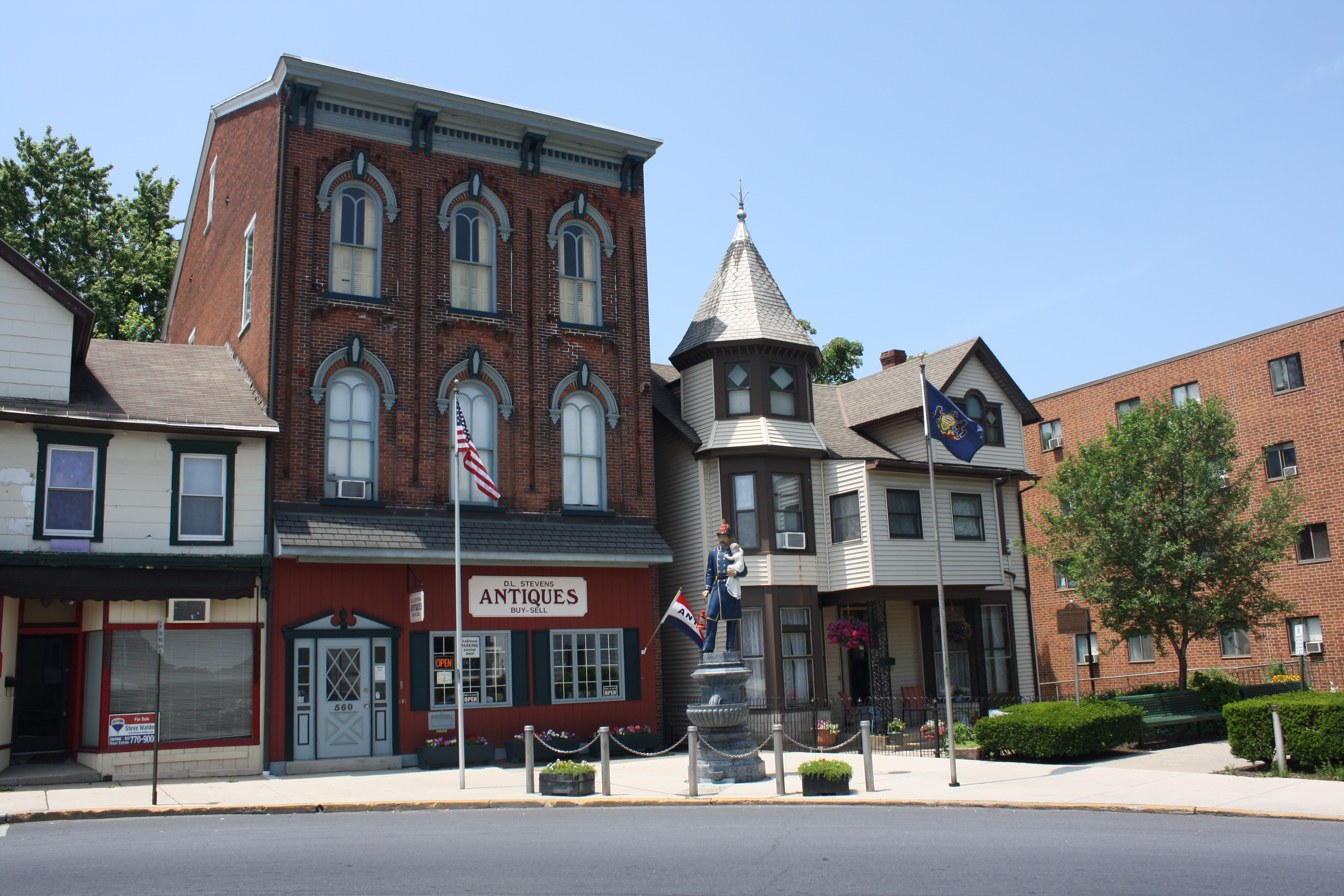
Fireman's Drinking Fountain on Main St.

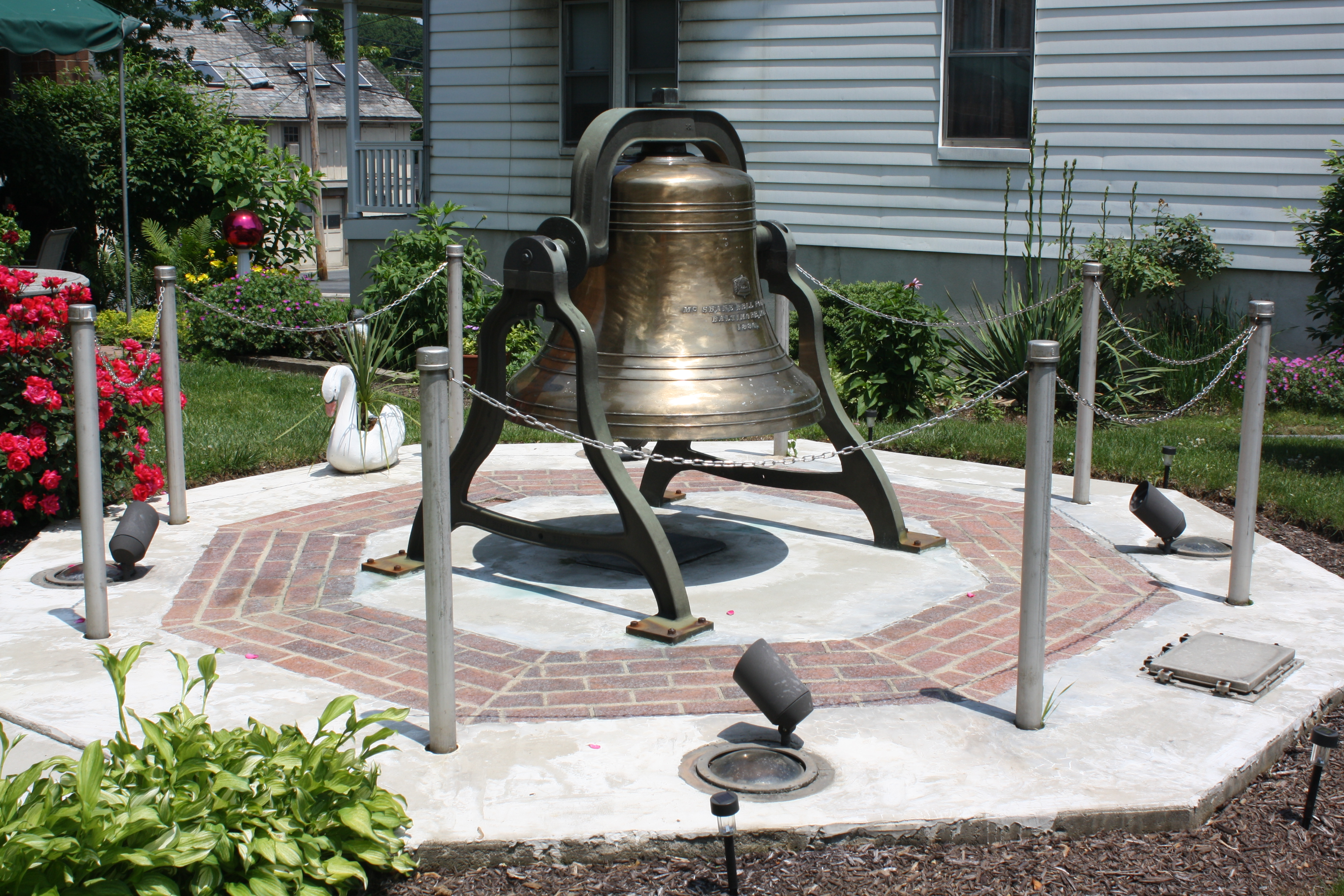
Bell Monument on Main St.

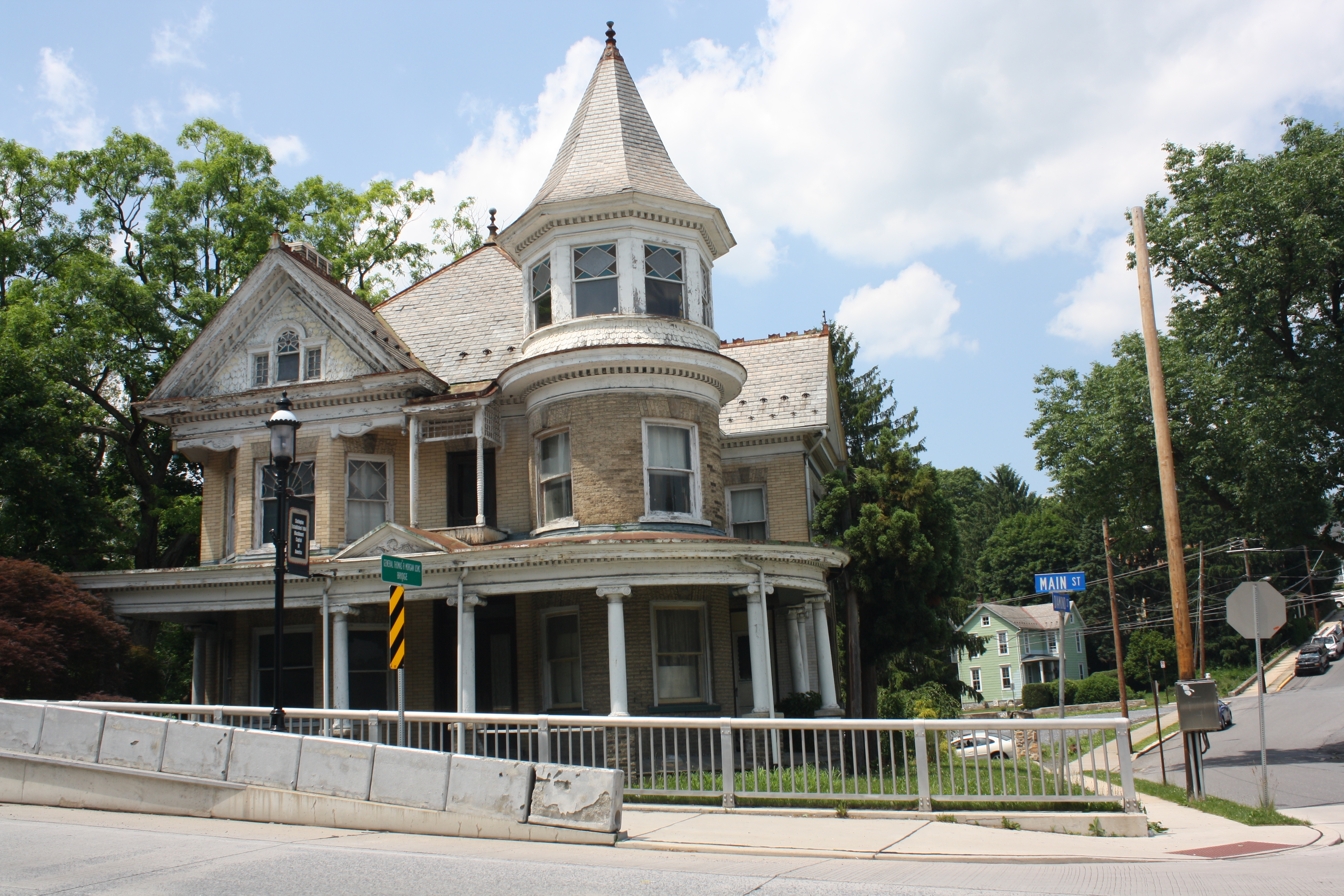
Alfred Kern House.

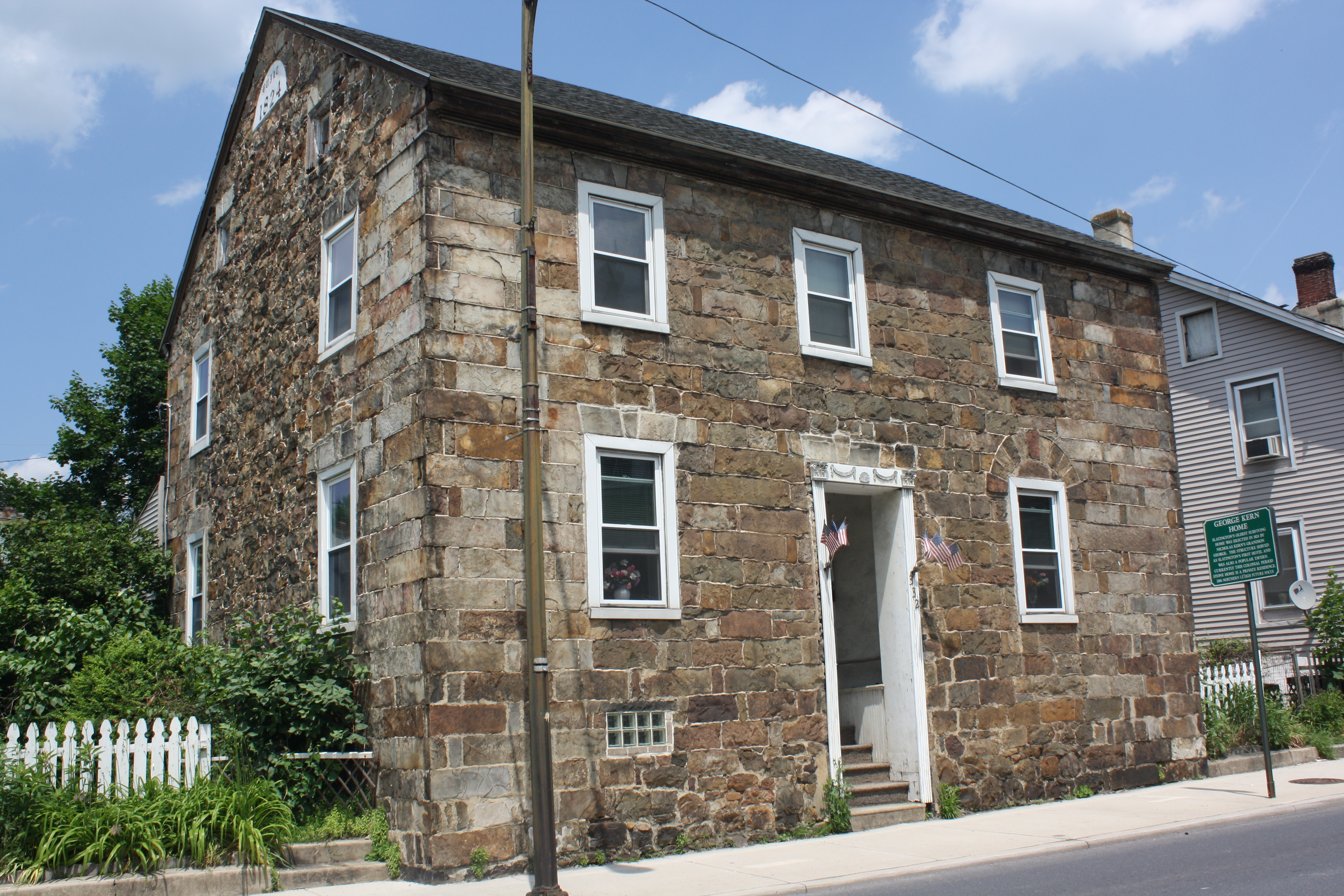
George Kern Home, Slatington's oldest surviving home.

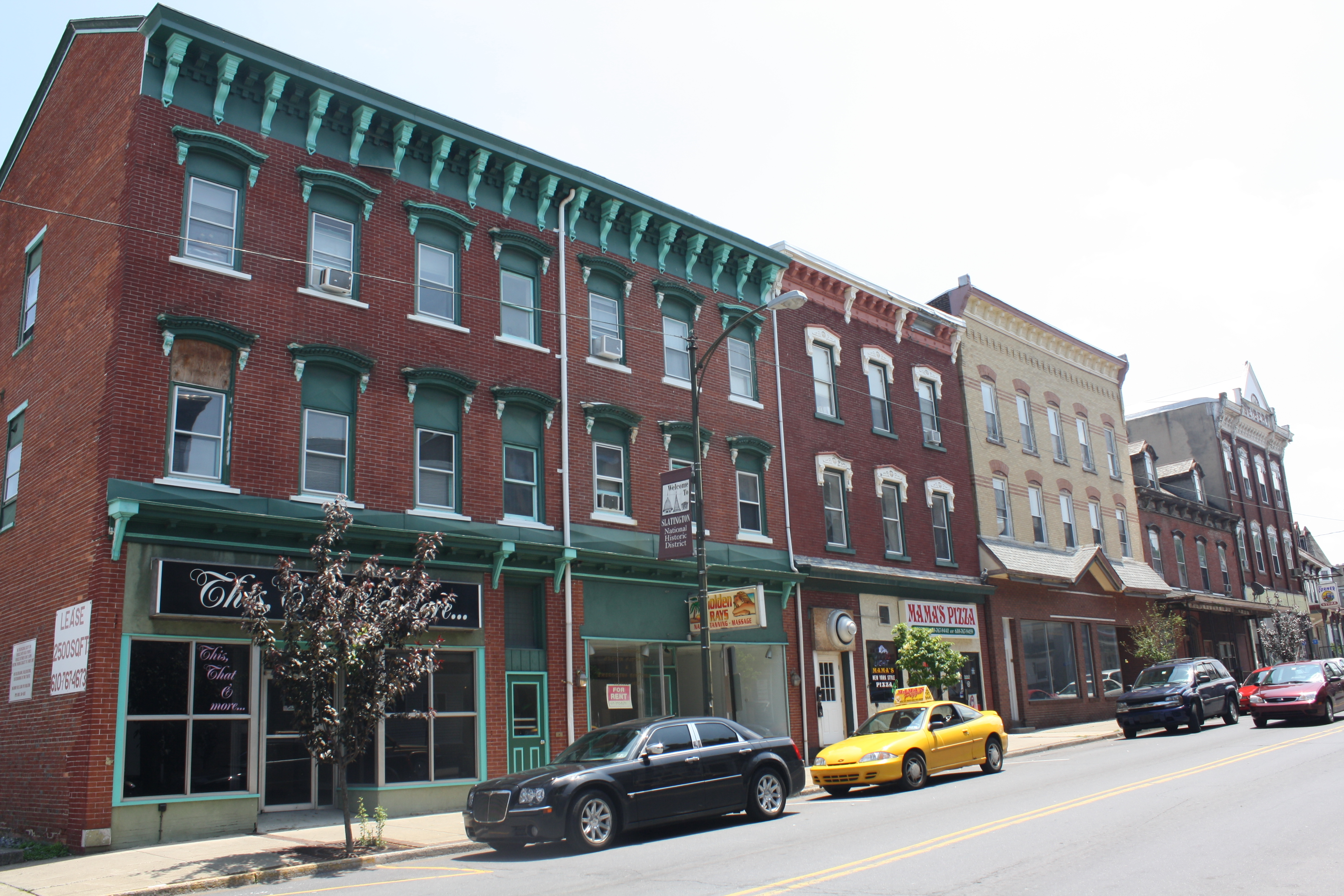
Main Street in eastern Slatington.

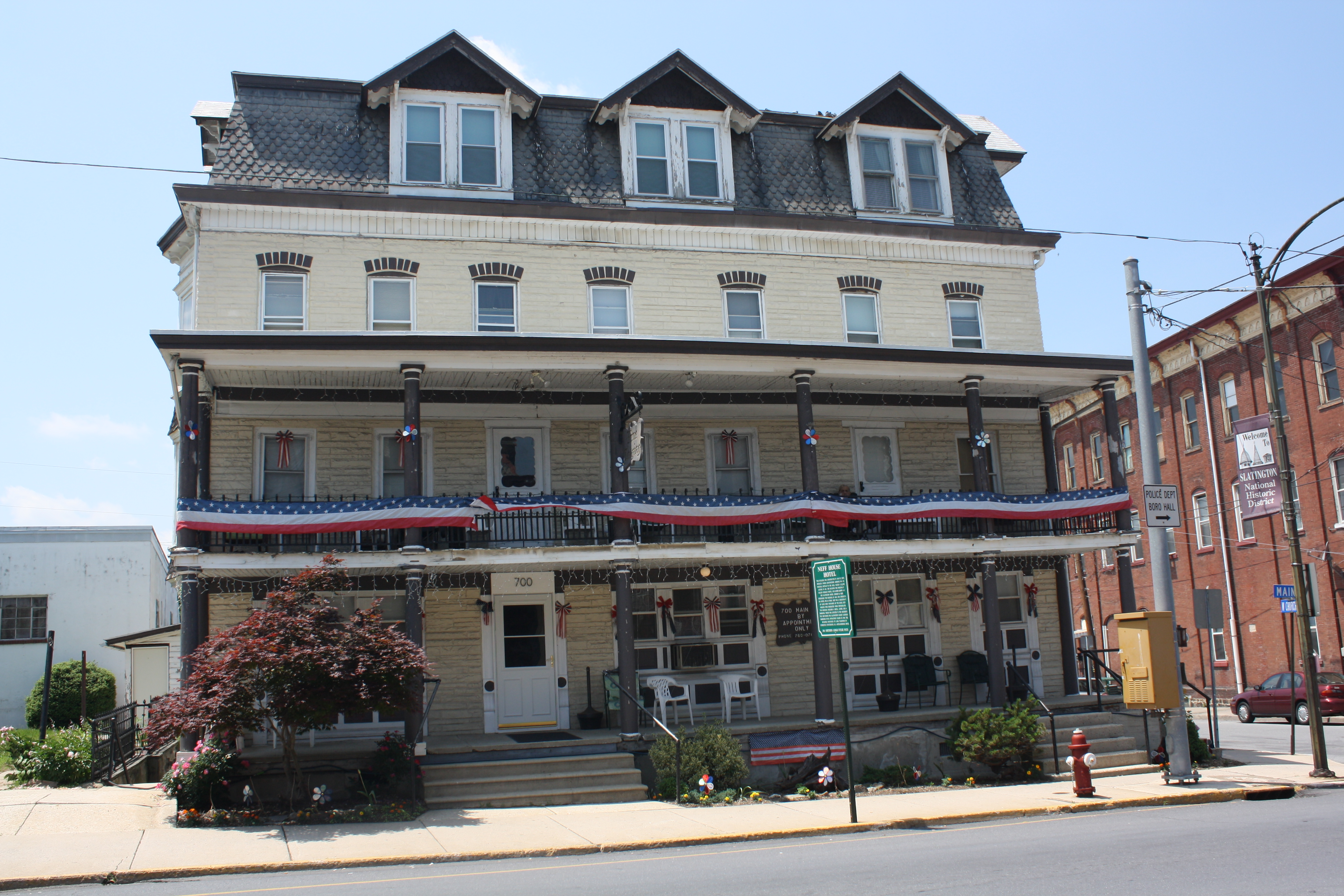
Neff House Hotel.

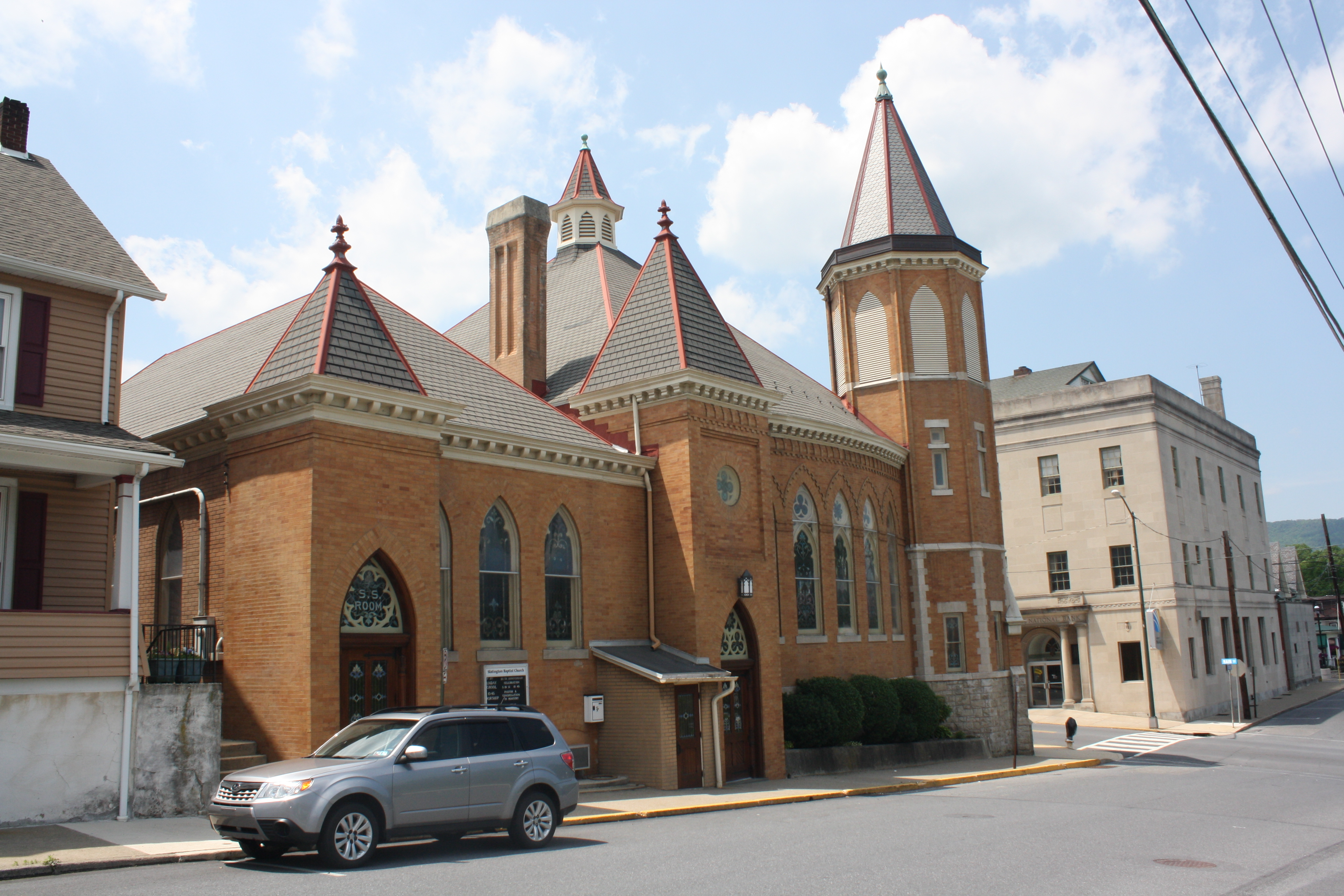
Slatington Baptist Church.

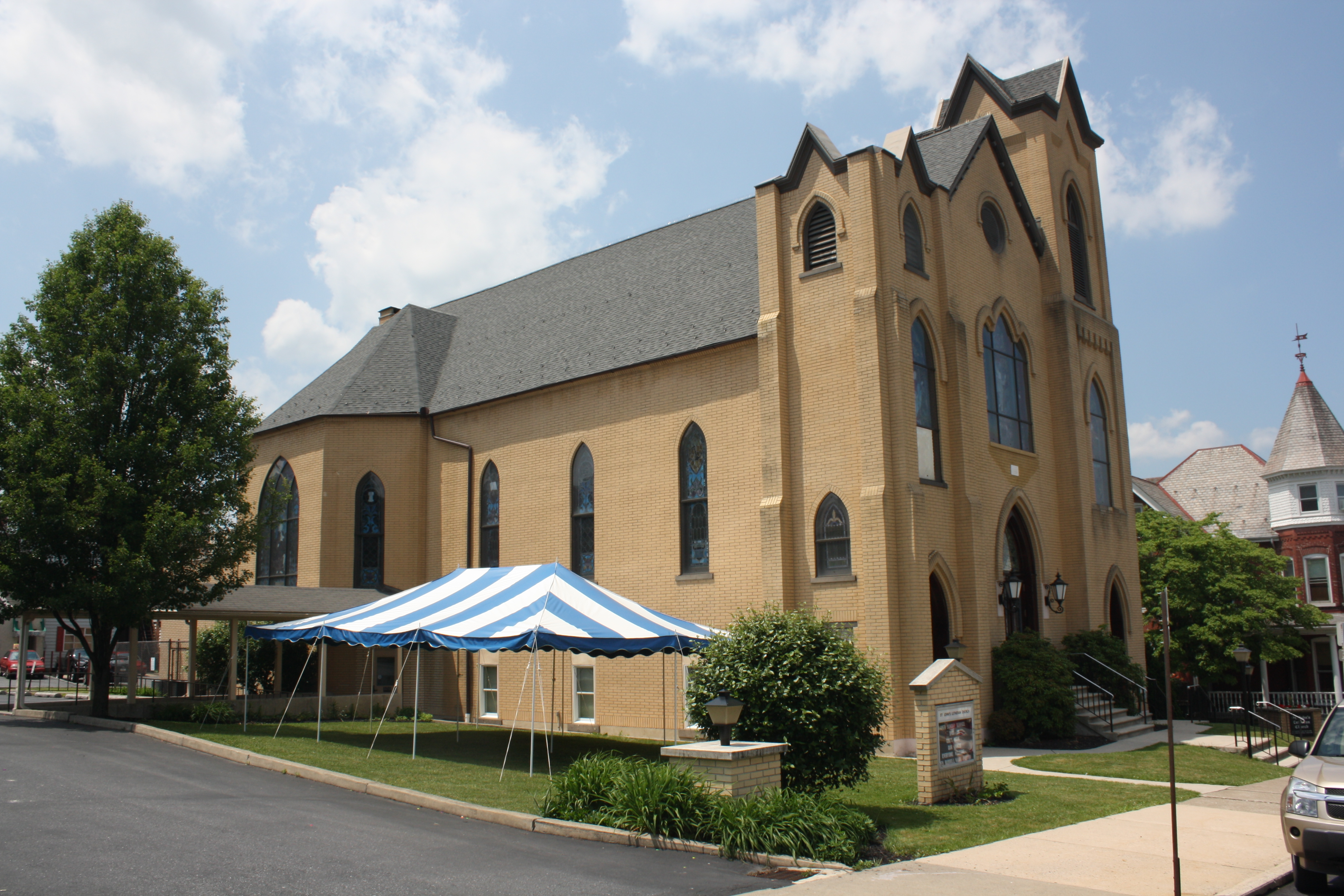
St. Johns Lutheran Church.

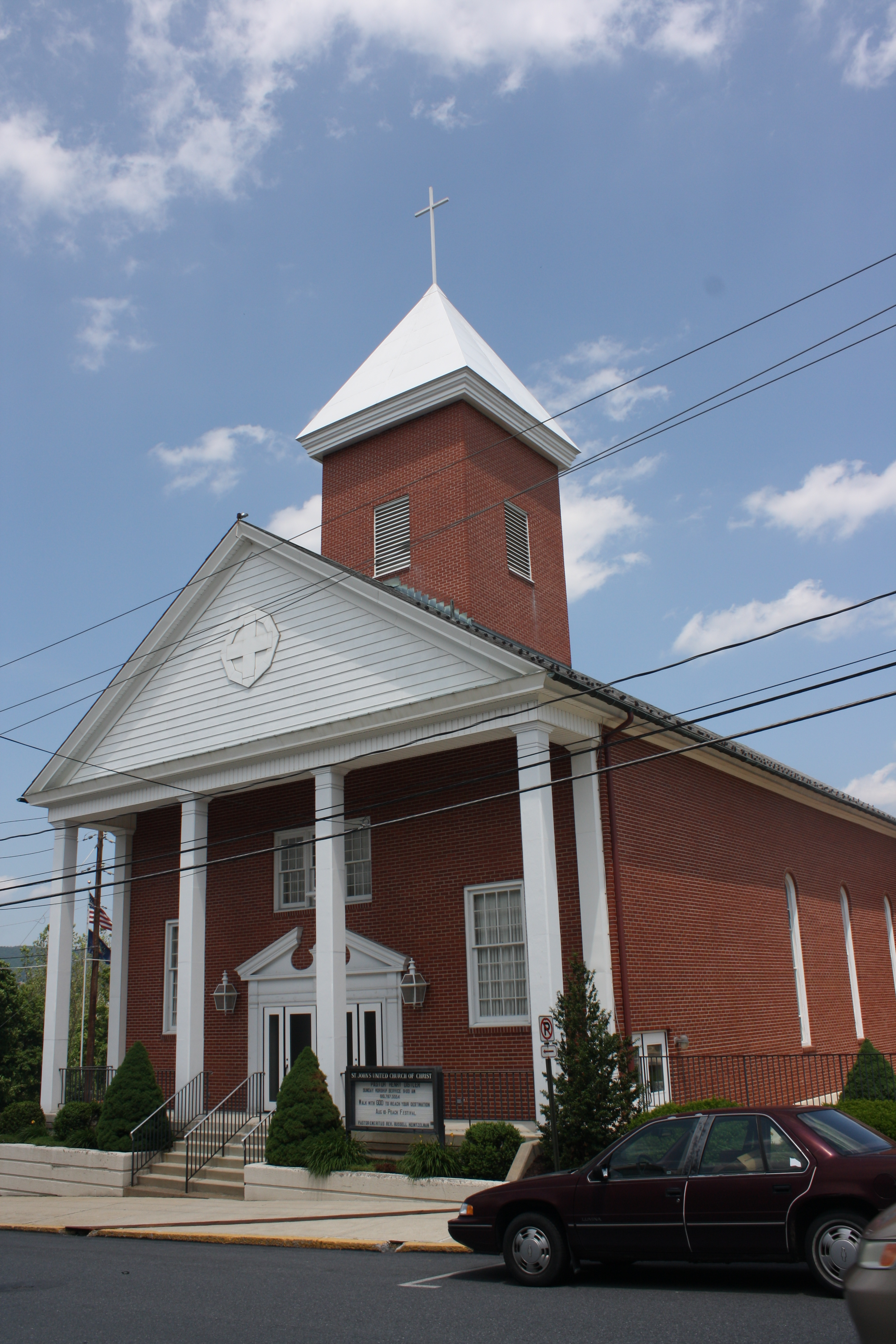
St. John's United Church of Christ.

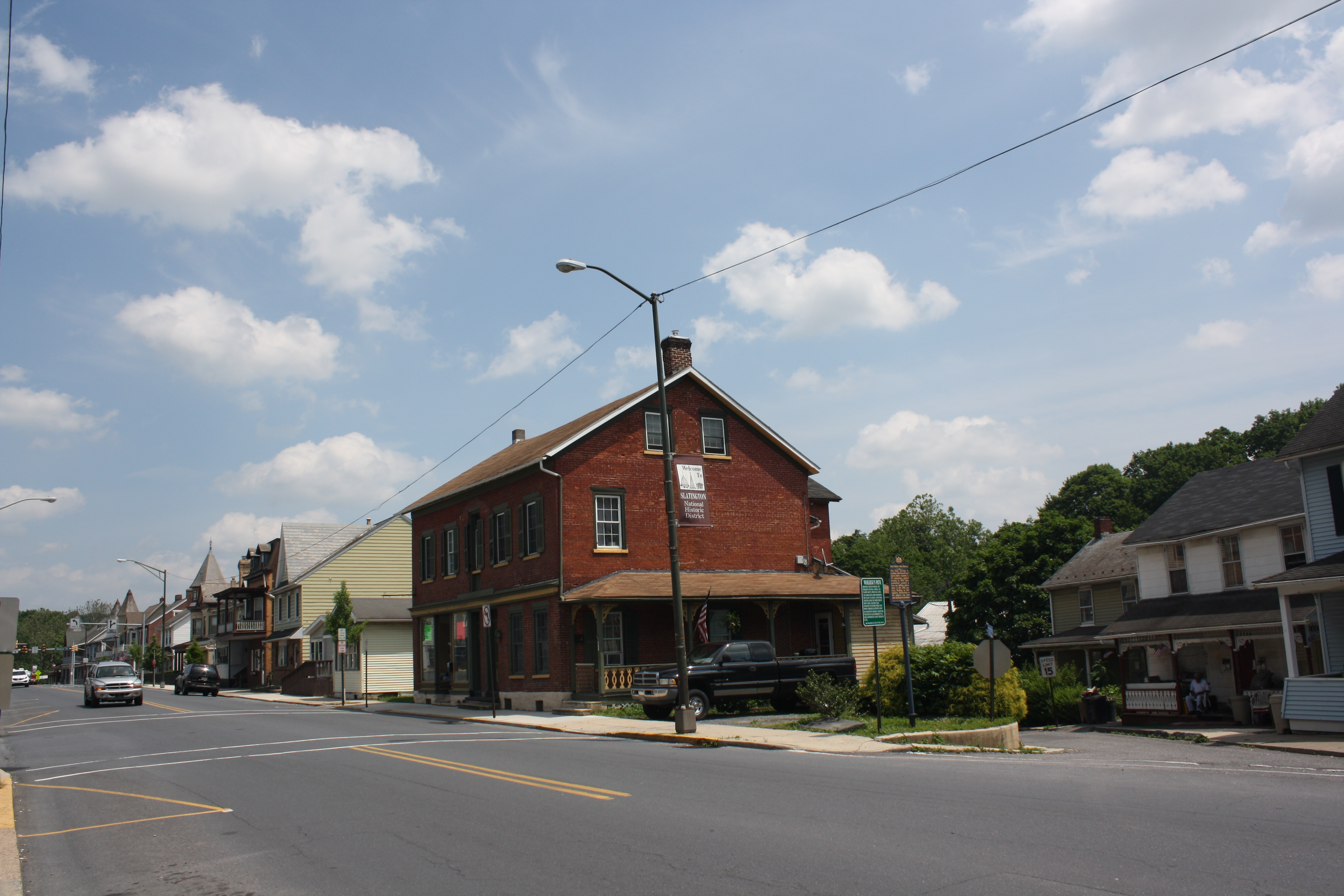
First School Slate Factory in western Slatington.
