= Slate Belt =

Cultural region in Pennsylvania

The Slate Belt is a geographic region spanning Northampton County, Pennsylvania and Lehigh County, Pennsylvania that is typically described as including Slatington, Bangor, Wind Gap, Pen Argyl, and Portland. The region is named for the historical prevalence of slate quarrying in the area.

== Geography ==
The Slate Belt lies between the Appalachian Trail in Slatington and the Delaware River in Portland, Pennsylvania.

Bangor, Wind Gap, Pen Argyl, and Portland are the largest communities in the Slate Belt region. Other smaller municipalities in the region include Roseto, East Bangor, Plainfield Township, Upper Mount Bethel, Lower Mount Bethel, and Washington Township.

This definition of the region's boundaries does not align perfectly with the geological boundaries of slate deposits, and is based more on the region of the slate industry and slate production. Geologist Charles H. Behre, in a 1926 report, included a much larger geographic definition of the Slate Belt that extended the southern boundary to the Lehigh River north of Catasauqua.

== History ==
=== 19th century ===
The slate industry in the Slate Belt quickly expanded following the arrival of Robert Morris Jones (1827-1886), a Welsh immigrant, in 1848. Jones founded Bangor, Pennsylvania and established several slate quarries. The industry continued to expand throughout the 19th century, reaching its peak production in 1903.

=== 20th century ===
In the years leading up to World War I, Pennsylvania was responsible for more than half of the slate production in the United States, and the vast majority of it came from Northampton County in the Lehigh Valley region of eastern Pennsylvania. More than 40% of national slate production during this period came from Northampton County alone. This made the Slate Belt the world's greatest slate producing region, despite the relatively small size of the area (about 22 square miles).

Industry in the Slate Belt began declining in the first half of the 20th century. During World War I, many quarry owners closed their quarries to allow workers to contribute to the war effort, especially at nearby Bethlehem Steel in Bethlehem. The increased use of other roofing materials, especially asphalt shingles, resulted in reduced demand for slate. Many quarries also removed all of the easily extractable slate present. A final factor to the industry's decline was the Great Depression, which resulted in greatly reduced home constructions that represented the market for slate roofs. Many quarries in the Slate Belt went out of business during this period.

=== 21st century ===
Three slate quarries remain active in the Slate Belt: one each in Bangor, Wind Gap, and Pen Argyl. Slate quarries that have been abandoned remain popular for recreational swimming, despite the dangers associated with them. Several people have drowned while swimming in them.

== Culture ==
Slate-board quoits, which originated with Slate Belt miners in the 1930s, remain popular in the Lehigh Valley and Northeastern regions of Pennsylvania.
