= Slatington, Pennsylvania =

Borough in Pennsylvania, US

- Borough
- Seal
- Nickname: The Slate Capital of America
- Location of Slatington in Lehigh County, Pennsylvania (left) and of Lehigh County in Pennsylvania (right)

- Location of Slatington in Pennsylvania Location in the United States
- Coordinates: 40°45′09″N 75°36′33″W
- Country: United States
- State: Pennsylvania
- County: Lehigh
- Settled: 1737
- Established: 1864

Government
  - Type: Mayor–council
  - Body: Slatington Borough Council
  - Mayor: Jeralyn Schoch
  - Borough Council President: Ryan Mayberry

Area
  - Borough: 1.38 sq mi (3.57 km^{2})
  - Land: 1.32 sq mi (3.42 km^{2})
  - Water: 0.058 sq mi (0.15 km^{2})
- Elevation: 490 ft (150 m)

Population (2020)
  - Borough: 4,283
  - Estimate (2025): 4,230
  - Density: 3,260.6/sq mi (1,258.92/km^{2})
  - Metro: 865,310 (US: 68th)
- Time zone: UTC-5 (EST)
  - Summer (DST): UTC-4 (EDT)
- ZIP Code: 18080
- Area code: 610
- FIPS code: 42-71144
- Primary airport: Lehigh Valley International Airport
- Major hospital: Lehigh Valley Hospital–Cedar Crest
- School district: Northern Lehigh
- Website: slatington.org

Slatington is a borough in Lehigh County, Pennsylvania, United States, in a geographic region known as the Slate Belt. As of the 2020 census, Slatington had a population of 4,283. Slatington is located northwest of Allentown and Bethlehem. Slatington is part of the Lehigh Valley metropolitan area, which had a population of 861,899 and was the 68th-most populous metropolitan area in the U.S. as of the 2020 census.

== History ==
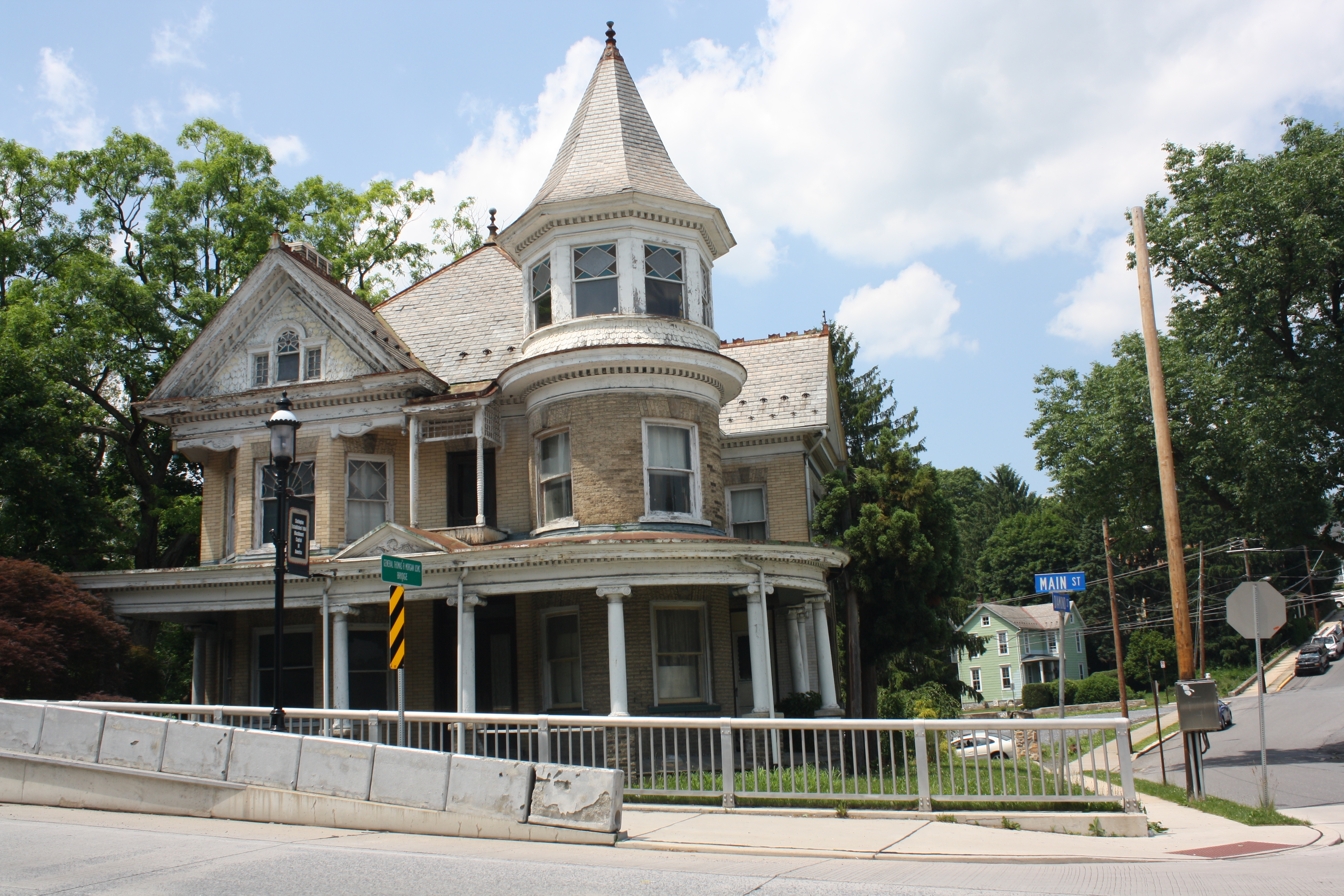
A Queen Anne style home at the corner of Diamond and Main Streets in Slatington in June 2013

In 1737, Nicholas Kern was the first settler in what would become Slatington. The Lenape Native Americans were already living along "Warriors Path," which would become Route 873. Kern established a sawmill shortly after arriving.

Slatington was settled in 1738 and incorporated in 1864.

In 1756, Benjamin Franklin reported to Governor Morris that he had procured boards and timber from Kern's sawmill. In the 19th century two Welshmen, who recognized its properties and importance from being used in Europe, discovered slate. A quarry was set up in 1845, and, in 1847, a factory was erected. In 1864, Slatington was incorporated into a Borough of Pennsylvania; its first mayor was Robert McDowell. Historically, structural iron, knit goods, and silk were manufactured in Slatington, and there were abundant slate quarries in the area.

In 1900, 3,773 people lived in Slatington, and, by 1910, that number had grown to 4,454. Between 1910 and the 2010 census, the population reduced slightly, to 4,232. The ZIP Code for Slatington is 18080.

In 2010, the Fireman's Drinking Fountain and Slatington Historic District were named to the National Register of Historic Places.

== Geography ==
Slatington is located in northern Lehigh County at 40°45′9″N 75°36′33″W (40.752561, −75.609229), on the west side of the Lehigh River. It is bordered to the east, across the river, by the borough of Walnutport in Northampton County. It is 14 miles (23 km) northwest of Allentown, 18 miles (29 km) northwest of Bethlehem, 62 miles (100 km) south of Scranton, and 70 miles (110 km) north of Philadelphia.

According to the U.S. Census Bureau, the borough has a total area of 1.4 square miles (3.6 km^{2}), of which 1.3 square miles (3.4 km^{2}) are land and 0.1 square miles (0.26 km^{2}), or 4.35%, are water. Slatington's elevation is 380 feet (120 m) above sea level at the center of town. The elevation varies from 345 feet (105 m) at the Lehigh River on the east side of town to 742 feet (226 m) atop a hill south of South Street, west of Pennsylvania Route 873.

Slatington is home to Victory Park, the location of the community pool, a disc golf course, and the Angelo J. Scarselletti Amphitheater.

== Demographics ==
Historical population
Census	Pop.	Note	%±
1870	1,508		—
1880	1,634		8.4%
1890	2,716		66.2%
1900	3,773		38.9%
1910	4,454		18.0%
1920	4,014		−9.9%
1930	4,134		3.0%
1940	4,062		−1.7%
1950	4,343		6.9%
1960	4,316		−0.6%
1970	4,687		8.6%
1980	4,277		−8.7%
1990	4,678		9.4%
2000	4,434		−5.2%
2010	4,232		−4.6%
2020	4,283		1.2%
2025 (est.)	4,230	▼	−1.2%

=== 2020 census ===
As of the 2020 census, Slatington had a population of 4,283. The median age was 38.5 years. 23.6% of residents were under the age of 18 and 16.1% of residents were 65 years of age or older. For every 100 females there were 92.2 males, and for every 100 females age 18 and over there were 90.1 males age 18 and over.

99.5% of residents lived in urban areas, while 0.5% lived in rural areas.

There were 1,771 households in Slatington, of which 29.6% had children under the age of 18 living in them. Of all households, 39.5% were married-couple households, 19.0% were households with a male householder and no spouse or partner present, and 30.7% were households with a female householder and no spouse or partner present. About 30.7% of all households were made up of individuals and 13.7% had someone living alone who was 65 years of age or older.

There were 1,924 housing units, of which 8.0% were vacant. The homeowner vacancy rate was 1.5% and the rental vacancy rate was 7.3%.

Racial composition as of the 2020 census
Race	Number	Percent
White	3,661	85.5%
Black or African American	85	2.0%
American Indian and Alaska Native	5	0.1%
Asian	20	0.5%
Native Hawaiian and Other Pacific Islander	0	0.0%
Some other race	178	4.2%
Two or more races	334	7.8%
Hispanic or Latino (of any race)	463	10.8%

=== 2010 census ===
As of the 2010 census, there were 4,232 people, 1,743 households, and 1,190 families residing in the borough. The population density was 3,354.6 inhabitants per square mile (1,295.2/km^{2}). There were 1,867 housing units at an average density of 1,412.5 units per square mile (545.4 units/km^{2}). The racial makeup of the borough was 96.23% White, 1.42% African American, 0.20% Native American, 0.38% Asian, 0.02% Pacific Islander, 0.77% from other races, and 0.97% from two or more races. Hispanic or Latino of any race were 2.03% of the population.

There were 1,743 households, out of which 35.7% had children under the age of 18 living with them, 48.7% were married couples living together, 13.9% had a female householder with no husband present, and 31.7% were non-families. 26.4% of all households were made up of individuals, and 12.5% had someone living alone who was 65 years of age or older. The average household size was 2.51 and the average family size was 3.01.

In the borough, the population was spread out, with 27.1% under the age of 18, 7.5% from 18 to 24, 32.4% from 25 to 44, 19.7% from 45 to 64, and 13.3% who were 65 years of age or older. The median age was 36 years. For every 100 females there were 94.7 males. For every 100 females age 18 and over, there were 89.3 males. The median income for a household in the borough was $36,531, and the median income for a family was $43,542. Males had a median income of $32,101 versus $23,796 for females. The per capita income for the borough was $16,189. About 10.6% of families and 12.3% of the population were below the poverty line, including 14.1% of those under age 18 and 10.1% of those age 65 or over.

== Education ==
The borough is served by the Northern Lehigh School District. Northern Lehigh School District has two elementary schools. Peters Elementary school educates students grades Kindergarten through second grade while Slatington Elementary educates grades 3–6. The district has only one middle school (grades 7–8) and Northern Lehigh High School in Slatington for grades nine through 12.

== Transportation ==
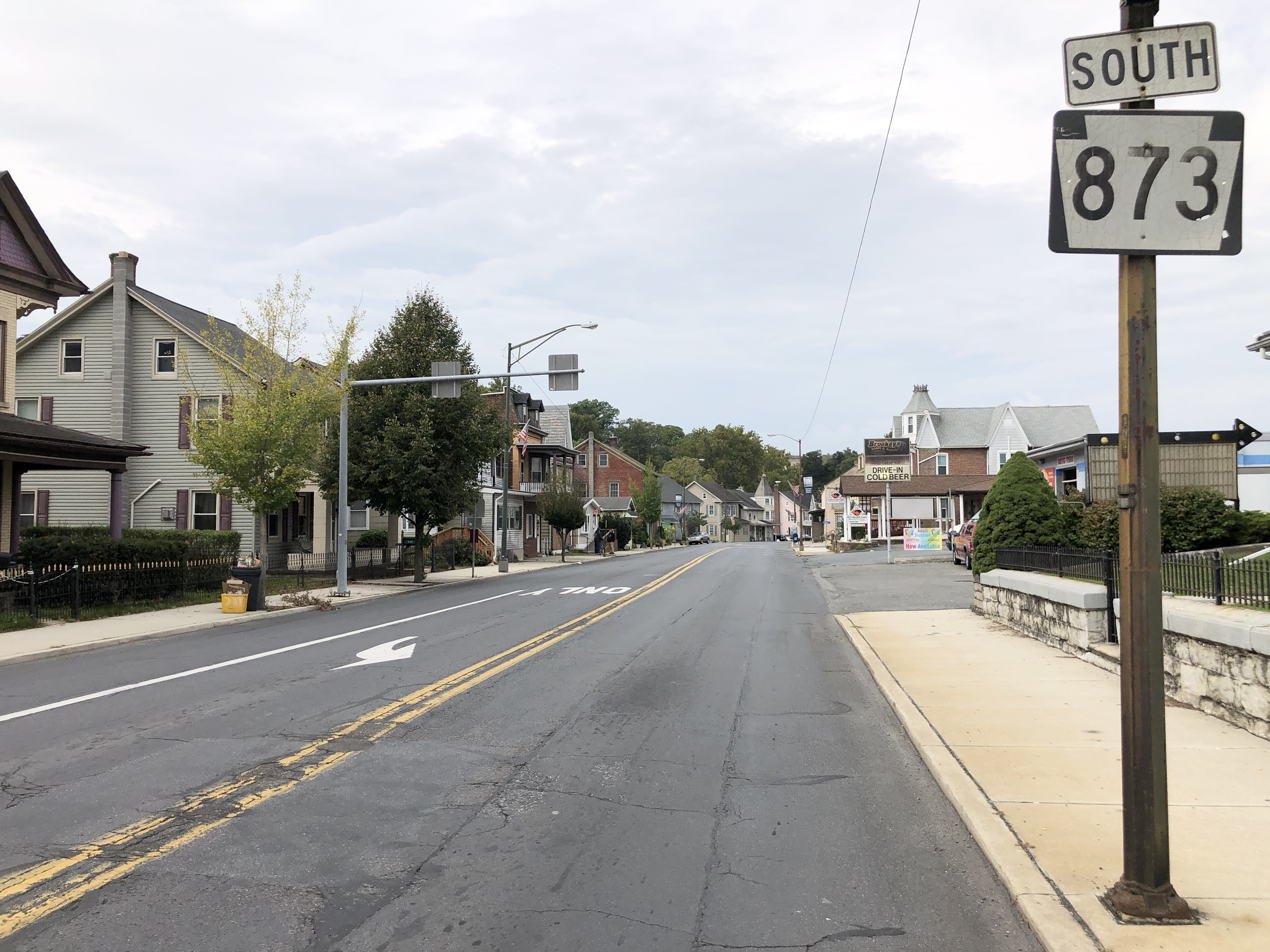
PA Route 873 southbound in Slatington

As of 2019, there were 16.06 miles (25.85 km) of public roads in Slatington, of which 2.23 miles (3.59 km) were maintained by the Pennsylvania Department of Transportation (PennDOT) and 13.83 miles (22.26 km) were maintained by the borough.

Pennsylvania Route 873 traverses Slatington, following a north–south alignment through the borough via Main Street and Walnut Street.

=== Airport ===
Slatington Airport
- IATA: none; ICAO: 69N; FAA LID: 69N

Summary
- Airport type: Small
- Serves: Slatington, Pennsylvania
- Location: Lehigh Valley
- Opened: May 1957
- Focus city for: Allentown/Jim Thorpe
- Time zone: EST (-5)
  - Summer (DST): EST (-4)
- Elevation AMSL: 380 ft (120 m)
- Coordinates: 40.7635994°N 75.6048965°W
- Interactive map of Slatington Airport

Slatington is home to the small Slatington Airport. The single runway airport is used by local monoplane enthusiasts as well as hot-air ballooners. The airport is listed as a "critical facility" for the regional Local Mitigation Strategy and would be used to fly supplies in and be used as an evacuation point in the event of a major natural disaster in the region.

Linear Air, a Massachusetts based air taxi company runs chartered monoplane flights out of Slatington Airport. The airport is also home to Chapter 855 of the Experimental Aircraft Association.

Since 2020 the airport has been home to an annual halloween hot air balloon show.

==== Accidents ====
At 2:25pm on August 21, 1988, James Raby Shea crashed his Stolp Starduster in a grove of trees about a quarter mile north of the runway after his engine failed shortly after takeoff but was uninjured.

On October 13, 2013, a Cessna monoplane flipped on the Slatington runway, with the pilot receiving minor injuries.

On July 29, 2021, Slatington was hit by an EF1 tornado, with the airport bearing the brunt of the damage. The airport's owner, Roger Sell reported that an airplane was tossed suffering significant damage, as well as damage to the airport's hangars.

== Notable people ==
- Anne Burlak, former organized labor leader
- George Hennessey, former professional baseball player, Chicago Cubs and Philadelphia Phillies
- Fred Hufsmith, tenor
- Charlie Johnson, former professional baseball player, Philadelphia Phillies
- William A. Steckel, former member, Pennsylvania House of Representatives
