= Pen Argyl Area School District =

School district in Pennsylvania

Coordinates: 40.83891°N 75.28362°W

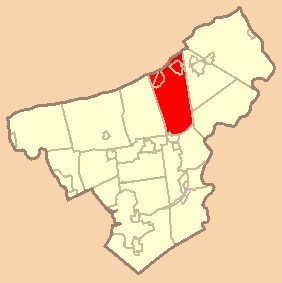
- Location of Pen Argyl Area School District in Northampton County, Pennsylvania

Address
- 1620 Teels Road Pen Argyl, Pennsylvania, 18072; United States

District information
- Type: Public
- Established: 1899
- Superintendent: Walter M. Schlegel, Jr.
- Schools: Three, including Pen Argyl Area High School
- Budget: $32.537 million
- NCES District ID: 4218570

Students and staff
- Enrollment: 1,440 (2022-23)
- Faculty: 121.17 (on an FTE basis)
- Student–teacher ratio: 11.88
- Athletic conference: Colonial League
- Colors: Green and White

Other information
- Website: www.penargylschooldistrict.org

Pen Argyl Area School District is a public school district located in Northampton County, Pennsylvania in the Lehigh Valley region of eastern Pennsylvania. It serves the boroughs of Pen Argyl and Wind Gap and Plainfield Township.

As of the 2022–23 school year, the school district had a total enrollment of 1,440 students between all three of its schools, according to National Center for Education Statistics data.

Students in ninth through 12th grades attend Pen Argyl Area High School in Pen Argyl. Students in grades four through eight attend Wind Gap Middle School. Students in grades kindergarten through three attend Plainfield Elementary School.

== Schools ==
- Pen Argyl Area High School
- Wind Gap Middle School
- Plainfield Elementary School
