= Mr. Pastie =

Branded foodstuff

Mr. Pastie ("PASS-tee") is a brand name pasty, a meat-and-potato turnover product. It is marketed by entrepreneur Garnet T. Sleep, Jr., owner of Real English Foods, Inc., based in Pen Argyl, Pennsylvania. Mr. Pastie is based on a traditional Cornish recipe and has been called "the original fast food." It has been sold in US military commissaries, High's Dairy Stores, Weis Markets Wal-Mart, and 7-Eleven convenience stores.

== Description ==
The Mr. Pastie is an oven-baked pie. It consists of a handmade dough shell, folded into a half-circle around a filling traditionally consisting of "ground beef, diced potatoes, and minced onion." Fillings may incorporate additional vegetables, such as carrots and peas, and Real English Foods has made pasties containing chicken, pork, ham, and sausage.

With its doughy crust, the pasty can be eaten without utensils. This feature and the turnover's long history in the British Isles have earned it the title "the original fast food."

== History ==
The name Mr. Pastie derives from pasty a Cornish word for a type of pie commonly taken by miners to work in the mines of Cornwall. Some of these miners emigrated to the United States and settled in the eastern part of Pennsylvania, where slate was also mined (the "Slate Belt"), bringing their traditional recipes with them. Many such recipes exist, perhaps at least one for each village in Cornwall.

Garnet Sleep, raised in the town of Pen Argyl in Pennsylvania's Slate Belt, founded the ironically named Real English Foods, Inc. in 1981 with the goal of bringing this traditional product to a wider marketplace as a pre-packaged meal. Sleep had earlier run an advertising agency in Washington, D.C. Sleep's grandfather had immigrated into the region in the 1880s from Cornwall bringing a "special family recipe" for pasties that had been passed down through generations, and Sleep states that selling pasties is the fulfillment of a boyhood dream.
