= William Steckel =

American politician

William A. Steckel

Member of the Pennsylvania House of Representatives from the 134th district
- In office 1969–1970
- Preceded by: District created
- Succeeded by: Joseph Zeller

Member of the Pennsylvania House of Representatives from the Lehigh County district
- In office 1955–1968

Personal details
- Born: November 12, 1921 Slatington, Pennsylvania
- Died: December 21, 2002 (aged 81) Slatington, Pennsylvania
- Party: Republican

William A. Steckel (November 12, 1921 – December 21, 2002) was a Republican member of the Pennsylvania House of Representatives.
