= Anne Burlak =

American labor activist (1911–2002)

Anne Burlak Timpson
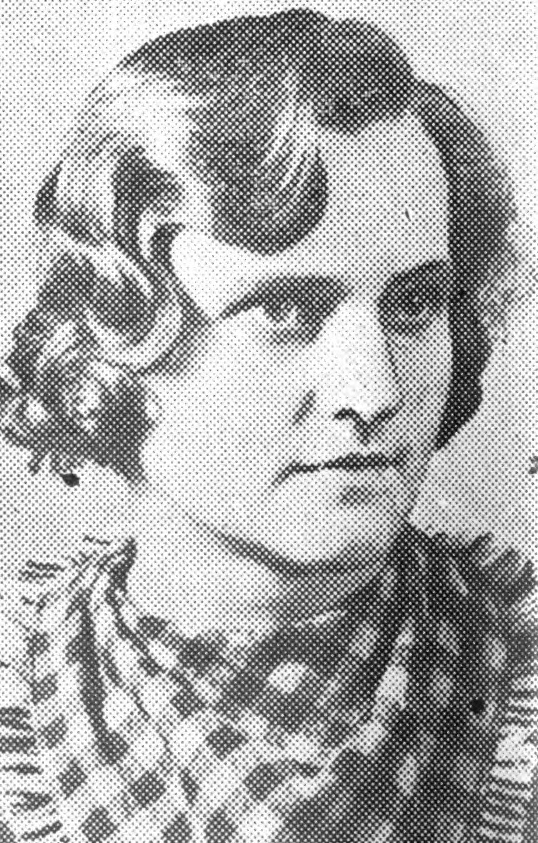
- Born: Anne Burlak; May 24, 1911; Slatington, Pennsylvania, U.S.
- Died: July 9, 2002 (aged 91); East Longmeadow, Massachusetts, U.S.
- Spouse: Arthur E. Timpson (m. 1939)
- Children: 2

Anne Burlak Timpson (May 24, 1911 – July 9, 2002) was an American early 20th century leader in labor organizing and leftist political movements. A member of the National Textile Workers Union and Communist Party, Burlak was jailed numerous times for sedition. Based in New England for much of her adult life, Burlak was a candidate for local and state offices in Rhode Island and played a major role in crafting the National Recovery Administration's workplace standards for textile unions during the New Deal era.

== Early life ==
Born in Slatington, Pennsylvania, Anne Burlak was the daughter of Harry and Anastasia Smigel Burlak, who came to the United States as immigrants from Tsarist Russia, in the area now comprising Ukraine. The eldest of six children, Burlak left school at the age of 14 to join the workforce and provide financial support to her family. As was common practice for children whose families needed the income, Burlak lied about her age in order to work at a textile mill in Bethlehem.

Introduced to left-wing ideas early in life by her father, who worked for Bethlehem Steel, Burlak joined the Young Communist League at the age of 15 or 16. Inspired by her father's struggle for fair wages and work hours, as well as by the union organizers like Ella Reeve Bloor, whom she met in 1925, Burlak tried to organize a labor union of her fellow workers and was subsequently fired.

In 1929, Burlak, her father, and her brother were arrested for sedition and on suspicion of spreading communist ideas. Reportedly, Burlak decided that, "I might as well join the Communist Party and learn more about it." Burlak was blacklisted following her arrest, and unable to find work; Harry Burlak was also terminated from his job at Bethlehem Steel. Harry and the rest of the Burlak family later relocated to the Soviet Union.

== Career ==
At 17, Burlak had been a delegate to the inaugural National Textile Workers Union (NWTU) convention. After the charges of sedition against her were dropped, she became a labor organizer for the NTWU, working full-time for ten dollars a week. At age 21, Burlak became the first woman elected to the role of National Secretary of the NWTU.

=== Georgia ===
Burlak gained her first major experience with labor management conflicts trying to organize workers across lines of race and ethnicity in the South. After briefly working in North and South Carolina, the NTWU sent her to Atlanta, in 1930 to organize workers there into multiracial unions. Facing opposition not only from recalcitrant mill owners but also from the state's enforcement of segregation, Burlak was arrested and charged with insurrection under Georgia law, which carried the death penalty. Burlak was one in a group of black and white Communist organizers who were facing insurrection charges; collectively they became known as the Atlanta Six and counted M. H. Powers, Joe Carr, and Herbert Newton among their number. Burlak and the rest of the Atlanta Six were held in jail for six weeks. Upon being released on bail, Burlak traveled the country to raise funds for the Atlanta Six's legal defense. The law under which the Atlanta Six were charged dated from before the Civil War, and would not be overturned until the Supreme Court's decision in Herndon v. Lowry (1937). The charges against Burlak and the Atlanta Six were later dropped in 1939.

=== New England ===
Following her release from prison in Georgia, Burlak began organizing Rhode Island textile workers in their struggle for collective bargaining, overtime pay, and wage increases. She would become a central figure in the strikes that shook the state's textile industry in the early 1930s. Burlak soon began leading strike actions in Pawtucket and Central Falls, and was arrested for alleged violence in a July 1931 strike. She was ultimately sentenced to 30 days in jail and a fine. As a response to her continued activism, she faced deportation by federal immigration authorities, who tried to prove she was not born in the United States.

During her time in Rhode Island, Burlak ran for elected office multiple times on the Communist Party ticket. In 1932, she ran for mayor of the city of Pawtucket, garnering only 160 votes in a city of 77,000 inhabitants. The Communist Party platform promised government-funded social welfare and support of workers' right to strike, among other planks. At the statewide and national level, Governor Theodore Francis Green and President Franklin Delano Roosevelt were elected in 1932 on the Democratic Party ticket, pledging similar reforms and support of workers. Burlak also led the Rhode Island delegation to the 1932 National Hunger March on Washington, D.C.

Burlak later unsuccessfully ran for Secretary of State of Rhode Island in 1938. Following this defeat, Burlak relocated to Massachusetts within the next several years, and was elected Executive Secretary of the Communist Party of Massachusetts in 1940. She would be based in the Boston area for the remainder of her life, where she continued to advocate for housing, schools, and social welfare.

=== The New Deal Era and the Red Scare ===
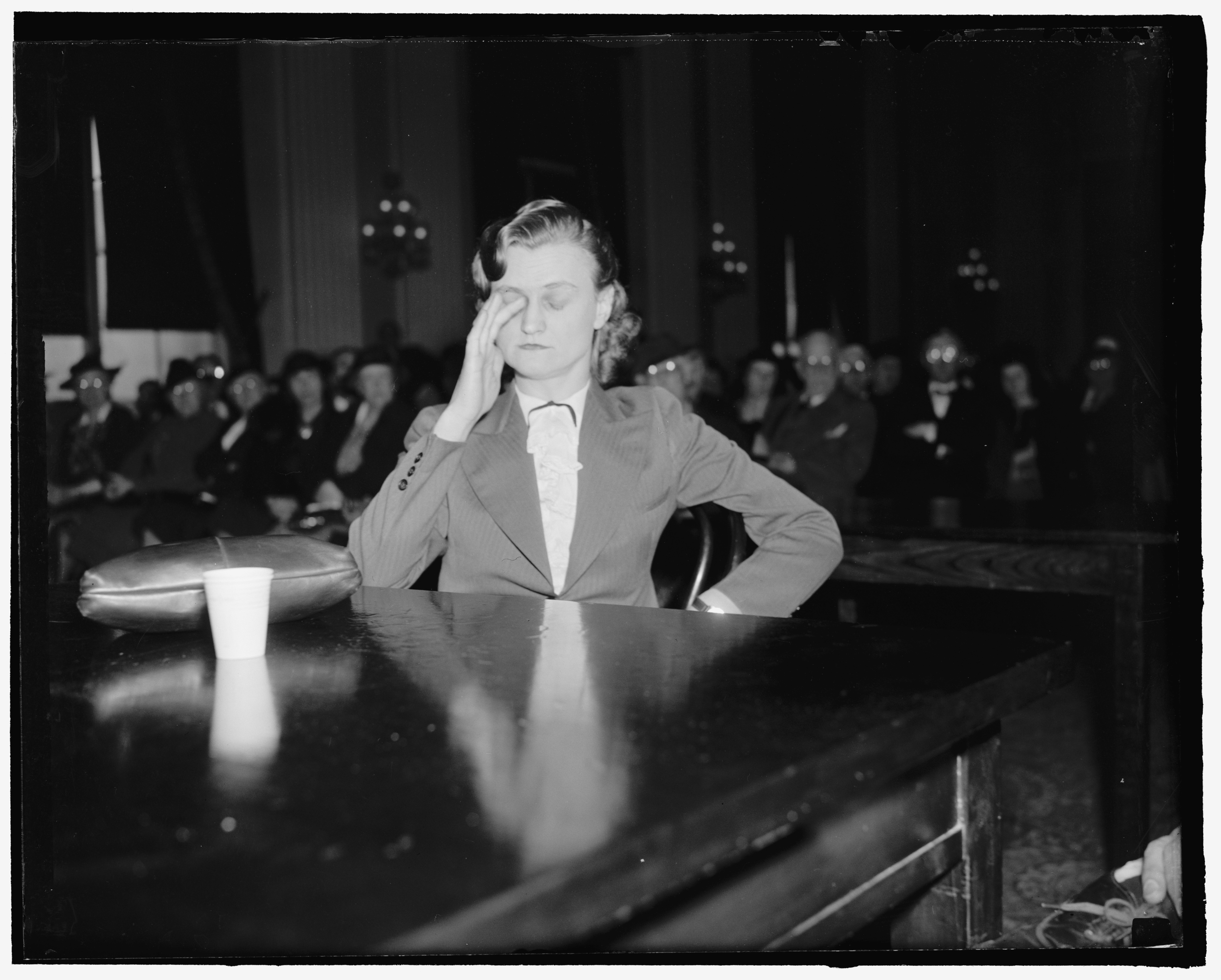
Burlak testifies before the Dies Committee, April 4, 1940

As the National Secretary of the NWTU, Burlak became involved in crafting aspects of the National Recovery Administration (NRA)'s industrywide codes for minimum working conditions on behalf of textile unions. While voluntary, the provisions laid out in the NRA were widely accepted around the United States, leading to an increase in collective bargaining in the workplace and worker membership in the American Federation of Labor (AFL). Backed by the federal government, the AFL, particularly its United Textile Workers union (UTW), became a powerful political player and purged Communists from its ranks. As a prominent member of the more radical NWTU, Burlak was deemed a threat by the AFL, who enlisted its leadership and law enforcement in preventing her from leading in strikes or attending worker rallies. In 1939, she was subpoenaed by the House Un-American Activities Committee.

Burlak was also targeted during the postwar Red Scare era. In 1956, she was arrested under the Smith Act, as were many other American Communists. The charges were not dropped until the Supreme Court decision in Yates v. United States (1957), which ruled that the First Amendment protected political speech in the absence of a "clear and present danger". Burlak was later arrested in 1964 under the McCarran Act, which required Communists to register with the United States government; the charges were dropped after the Supreme Court ruled the McCarran Act unconstitutional in Albertson v. Subversive Activities Control Board.

== Personal life ==
Burlak married fellow labor activist Arthur E. Timpson in 1939. The couple had two children, Kathryn Anne Timpson Wright (born 1943) and William Michael Timpson (born 1946). She died July 9, 2002, in East Longmeadow, Massachusetts.

== Legacy ==
Burlak's passion and staunch Communism earned her the nicknames of the "Red Flame," the "girl striker," "Seditious Anne," and the "Hunger March Queen." In 1933, social activist and writer Dorothy Day described Burlak "as a fine, strapping young girl, blond-haired, rosy cheeked, looking like a Valkyrie as she marches at the head of her strikers," but criticized her for joining in the "obstructionist" tactics of the Communist Party as opposed to working with more established unions. Poet Muriel Rukeyser penned a tribute to Burlak in her 1939 collection A Turning Wind: Poems.

Burlak was awarded the Wonder Woman Award from the Wonder Woman Foundation in 1982, and the Sacco-Vanzetti Memorial Award for Social Justice from the Community Church of Boston in 1997.

Anne Burlak Timpson donated her papers to the Sophia Smith Collection at Smith College from 1998 to 1999. Additional materials were donated by her children and her brother. Her papers date "from 1912 to 2003 and are primarily related to her personal and political life."
