= Joseph Zeller =

American politician (1918–2018)

Joseph R. Zeller

Member of the Pennsylvania House of Representatives from the 134th district
- In office 1971–1980
- Preceded by: William Steckel
- Succeeded by: Donald Snyder

Personal details
- Born: September 19, 1918 Campus, Illinois, U.S.
- Died: December 12, 2018 (aged 100) Pennsylvania, U.S.
- Party: Democratic

Joseph R. Zeller (September 19, 1918 – December 12, 2018) was an American politician who was a Democratic member of the Pennsylvania House of Representatives.

== Biography ==
Joseph Zeller was born in Campus, Illinois. He went to Pennsylvania State University and served in the United States Navy. Zeller worked in the fire protection apparatus business. He served on the Emmaus, Pennsylvania council and as mayor. He died at the age of 100 in 2018.
