= Broughton Township, Livingston County, Illinois =

Coordinates: 40°58′48″N 88°18′21″W

Broughton Township
- Township
- Location in Livingston County

- Livingston County's location in Illinois
- Country: United States
- State: Illinois
- County: Livingston
- Established: November 3, 1857

Area
  - Total: 35.24 sq mi (91.3 km^{2})
  - Land: 35.24 sq mi (91.3 km^{2})
  - Water: 0 sq mi (0 km^{2}) 0%

Population (2020)
  - Total: 303
  - Density: 8.60/sq mi (3.32/km^{2})
- Time zone: UTC-6 (CST)
  - Summer (DST): UTC-5 (CDT)
- FIPS code: 17-105-08888

Broughton Township is located in Livingston County, Illinois. As of the 2020 census, its population was 303 and it contained 133 housing units. Broughton Township changed its name from Broughtonville Township on October 3, 1860.

== Geography ==
According to the 2021 census gazetteer files, Broughton Township has a total area of 35.24 square miles (91.27 km^{2}), all land.

== Demographics ==
As of the 2020 census there were 303 people, 140 households, and 82 families residing in the township. The population density was 8.60 inhabitants per square mile (3.32/km^{2}). There were 133 housing units at an average density of 3.77 per square mile (1.46/km^{2}). The racial makeup of the township was 94.39% White, 0.00% African American, 0.33% Native American, 0.00% Asian, 0.00% Pacific Islander, 0.00% from other races, and 5.28% from two or more races. Hispanic or Latino of any race were 2.31% of the population.

There were 140 households, out of which 26.40% had children under the age of 18 living with them, 47.86% were married couples living together, 7.86% had a female householder with no spouse present, and 41.43% were non-families. 29.30% of all households were made up of individuals, and 25.70% had someone living alone who was 65 years of age or older. The average household size was 2.20 and the average family size was 2.77.

The township's age distribution consisted of 17.5% under the age of 18, 4.5% from 18 to 24, 25.6% from 25 to 44, 35% from 45 to 64, and 17.2% who were 65 years of age or older. The median age was 48.5 years. For every 100 females, there were 120.0 males. For every 100 females age 18 and over, there were 96.9 males.

The median income for a household in the township was $81,964, and the median income for a family was $96,786. Males had a median income of $62,778 versus $32,500 for females. The per capita income for the township was $39,003. About 0.0% of families and 1.0% of the population were below the poverty line, including 0.0% of those under age 18 and 1.9% of those age 65 or over.

Historical population
Census	Pop.	Note	%±
2010	313		—
2020	303		−3.2%
U.S. Decennial Census
