= Pen Argyl Area High School =

Coordinates: 40.8710°N 75.2606°W

- 501 West Laurel Avenue; Pen Argyl, Pennsylvania; United States

Information
- Type: Public high school
- Established: 1899
- NCES School ID: 421857006439
- Principal: Nolan Gerencser
- Staff: 35.55 (on an FTE basis)
- Grades: 9th–12th
- Enrollment: 475 (2024–25)
- Student to teacher ratio: 13.36
- Campus type: Suburb: Large
- Colors: Green and White
- Athletics conference: Colonial League
- Mascot: Green Knight
- Rival: Bangor Area High School
- Publication: The Green Echo
- Website: paahs.penargylschooldistrict.org

Pen Argyl Area High School is a four-year public high school located in Pen Argyl, Pennsylvania, in the Lehigh Valley region of eastern Pennsylvania. It is the only high school in the Pen Argyl Area School District. As of the 2024–25 school year, the school has an enrollment of 475 students, according to National Center for Education Statistics data.

The school's colors are green and white, and its mascot is the Green Knight.

== Athletics ==
The school's athletic teams belong to the PIAA's District XI and are a member of the Colonial League.

=== PIAA District XI championships ===
Football:
1984, 1986 (Class A)
2001, 2011, 2012 (Class AA)

=== Teams ===
Boys Sports

- Baseball - AAA
- Basketball - AAAA
- Cross Country - AA
- Football - AAA
- Golf - AA
- Soccer AA
- Tennis - AA
- Track and field - AA
- Wrestling - AA

Girls Sports

- Basketball - AAA
- Cheer - AAAAAA
- Cross Country - AA
- Field hockey - A
- Soccer - AA
- Softball - AAA
- Tennis - AA
- Track and Field - AA

== Rivalry ==
Pen Argyl has been involved in a long-standing rivalry with Bangor Area High School. The football rivalry between these two teams is arguably the most well-known aspect of this rivalry. The game was initially played on Thanksgiving Day, but this tradition ended in the mid-1970s. It is now the regular season finale for both teams. The two teams first met on the football field in 1920, with 2016 marking the 97th meeting between the Green Knights and the Slaters. Despite a decent size difference between the two schools, Pen Argyl leads the overall series 50-44-4. They have won 16 of the last 18 meetings.

== Athletic facilities ==
The Green Knights football team has their home games at Alumni Stadium, located on the high school campus. The stadium has a cement-based home section, stretching from goal line to goal line and rising 20 rows above the field. A smaller visitors section was installed on the other side of the field in the early to mid-2000s. The stadium is also known as "The Hill" because it is located on top of a short but steep hill. Alumni Stadium is one of only two football fields in the Colonial League that does not have stadium lights; the other is Wilson Area High School). As a result, home games are played on Saturday afternoons.

Recently, the school refinished and updated their gymnasium floor with a new Green Knight design donated by the class of 2010.
