= Ryo Tokita =

Japanese born artist

Ryo Tokita' is a Japanese born artist. In 1969, he emigrated to the United States, where he settled in Pen Argyl, Pennsylvania, outside Nazareth.

He has produced op art and color field pieces and a series of Japanese-influenced works. Recently the subject of a retrospective at Lafayette College's Williams Center in Easton, Pennsylvania, his work has also been introduced into the permanent collection of and is currently on view at the Allentown Art Museum.

In the 1960s, he was one of 46 artists exhibited in the Museum of Modern Art's International Council's traveling exhibition named The New Japanese Painting and Sculpture. In 1985, he was one of nine regrouped for Modern Japanese Abstracts at the Firehouse Gallery of Nassau Community College in East Garden City on Long Island.
