= Fireman's Drinking Fountain =

- U.S. National Register of Historic Places
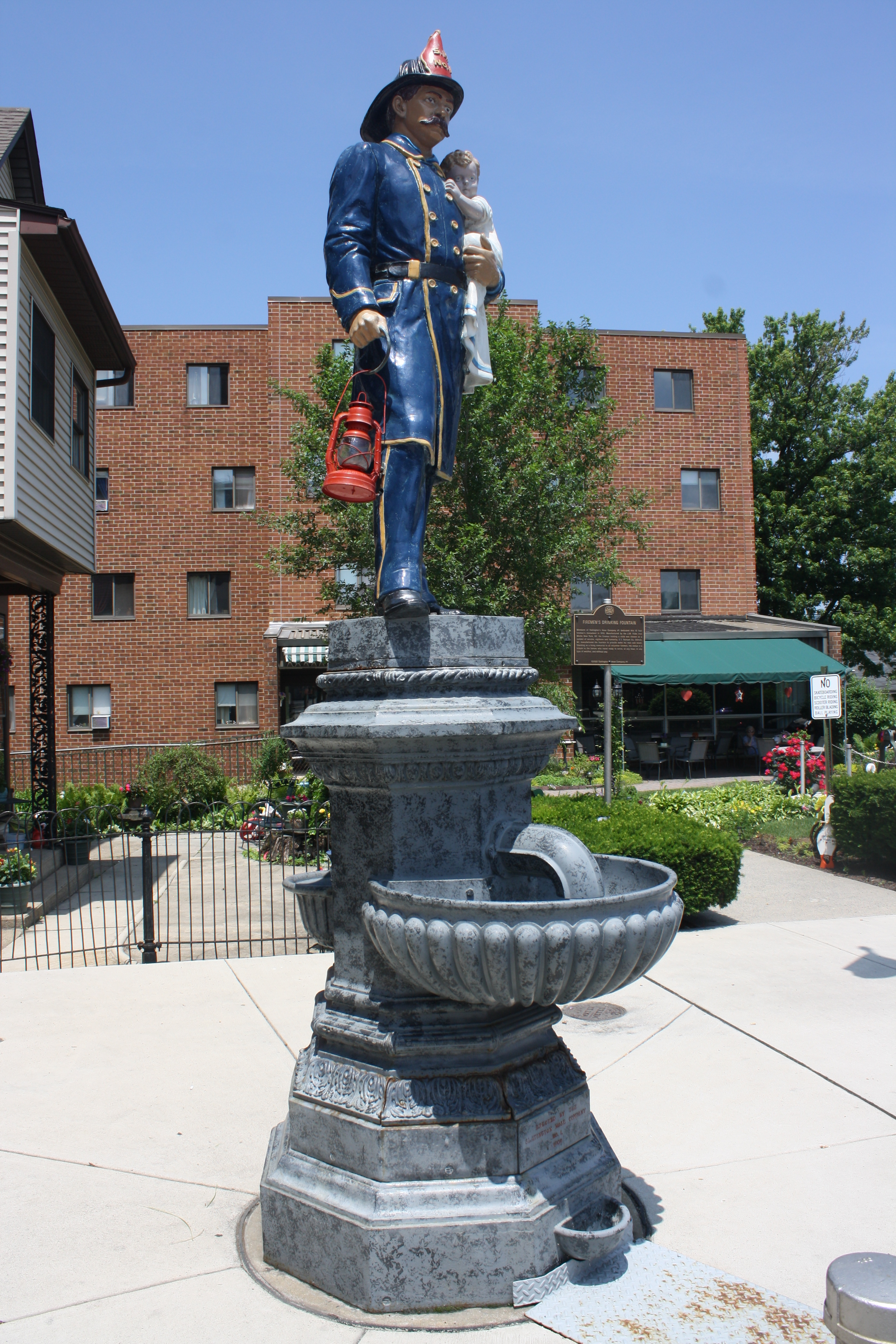
- Fireman's Drinking Fountain in June 2013

- Location within Pennsylvania Location within the United States
- Location: Main St., Slatington, Pennsylvania, U.S.
- Coordinates: 40°45′6″N 75°36′48″W
- Area: 0.1 acres (0.040 ha)
- Built: 1909
- Architect: Fiske, J.W., Iron Works; Caspar Buberl, sculptor
- NRHP reference No.: 81000551
- Added to NRHP: November 9, 1981

Fireman's Drinking Fountain is a historic drinking fountain located at Slatington, Lehigh County, Pennsylvania. It was built in 1909, and is a 12-foot high monument, with a 7-foot, 3-inch, statue of a volunteer fireman holding a child in his left hand and a lantern in his right.

The zinc statue was manufactured by the J. W. Fiske & Company. It was restored in 1979, after being hit by an automobile.

It was added to the National Register of Historic Places in 1981.

== See also ==
- Drinking fountains in the United States
- List of firefighting monuments and memorials
