= Pen Argyl, Pennsylvania =

Borough in Pennsylvania, US

Pen Argyl Kleiberg
- Borough
- Borough of Pen Argyl
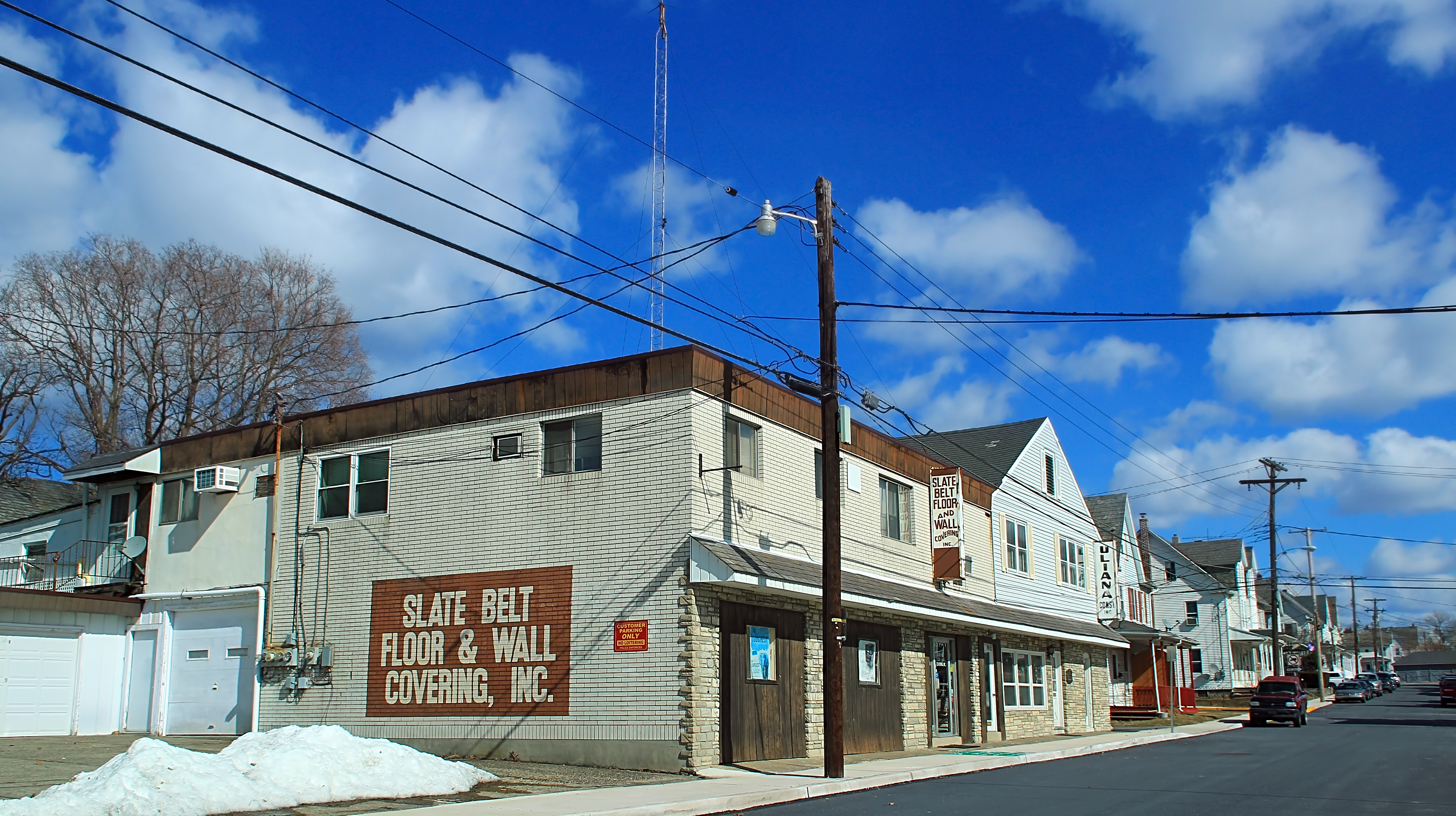
- Pen Argyl in February 2013

- Seal
- Etymology: Pen, Cornish for "head;" or "end," Argyl, for "clay" (or slate)
- Location of Pen Argyl in Northampton County, Pennsylvania (left) and of Northampton County in Pennsylvania (right)

- Location of Pen Argyl in Pennsylvania Pen Argyl (the United States)
- Coordinates: 40°52′08″N 75°15′20″W
- Country: United States
- State: Pennsylvania
- County: Northampton
- Incorporated: 1882
- Named for: Slate

Area
  - Borough: 1.39 sq mi (3.61 km^{2})
  - Land: 1.34 sq mi (3.48 km^{2})
  - Water: 0.050 sq mi (0.13 km^{2})
- Elevation: 781 ft (238 m)

Population (2020)
  - Borough: 3,510
  - Density: 2,614.8/sq mi (1,009.58/km^{2})
  - Metro: 865,310 (US: 68th)
- Time zone: UTC-5 (EST)
  - Summer (DST): UTC-4 (EDT)
- ZIP Code: 18072
- Area codes: 610 and 484
- FIPS code: 42-58696
- Primary airport: Lehigh Valley International Airport
- Major hospital: Lehigh Valley Hospital–Cedar Crest
- School district: Pen Argyl Area
- Website: penargylborough.com

Pen Argyl (/pɛn ɑːrdʒɪl/; Pennsylvania Dutch: Kleiberg) is a borough in Northampton County, Pennsylvania, United States. The borough's population was 3,510 as of the 2020 census.

Pen Argyl is located 26 miles (42 km) north of Allentown. It is part of the Lehigh Valley metropolitan area, which had a population of 861,899 and was the 68th most populous metropolitan area in the U.S. as of the 2020 census.

== History ==
In 1853, Joseph Kellow discovered slate in the surrounding area, coining what is now known as the Slate Belt community. The name Pen Argyl originated from the Cornish name meaning "head" and the Anglo-Saxon name of Slate Rock, meaning "argylite". With the surge of quarrymen from Cornwall and England, the town expanded. Today, there is still one slate quarry in operation. Pen Argyl was once home to Lehigh and New England Railroad’s main freight yard and maintenance complex. The railroad’s roundhouse and shop building still stand just west of town along Pennsylvania Ave.

== Population ==
In 1900, 2,784 people lived in Pen Argyl, and in 1910, 3,967 people lived here. The population was 3,510 at the 2020 census.

== Geography ==
According to the U.S. Census Bureau, the borough has a total area of 1.4 square miles (3.6 km^{2}), of which 0.71% is water.

== Transportation ==
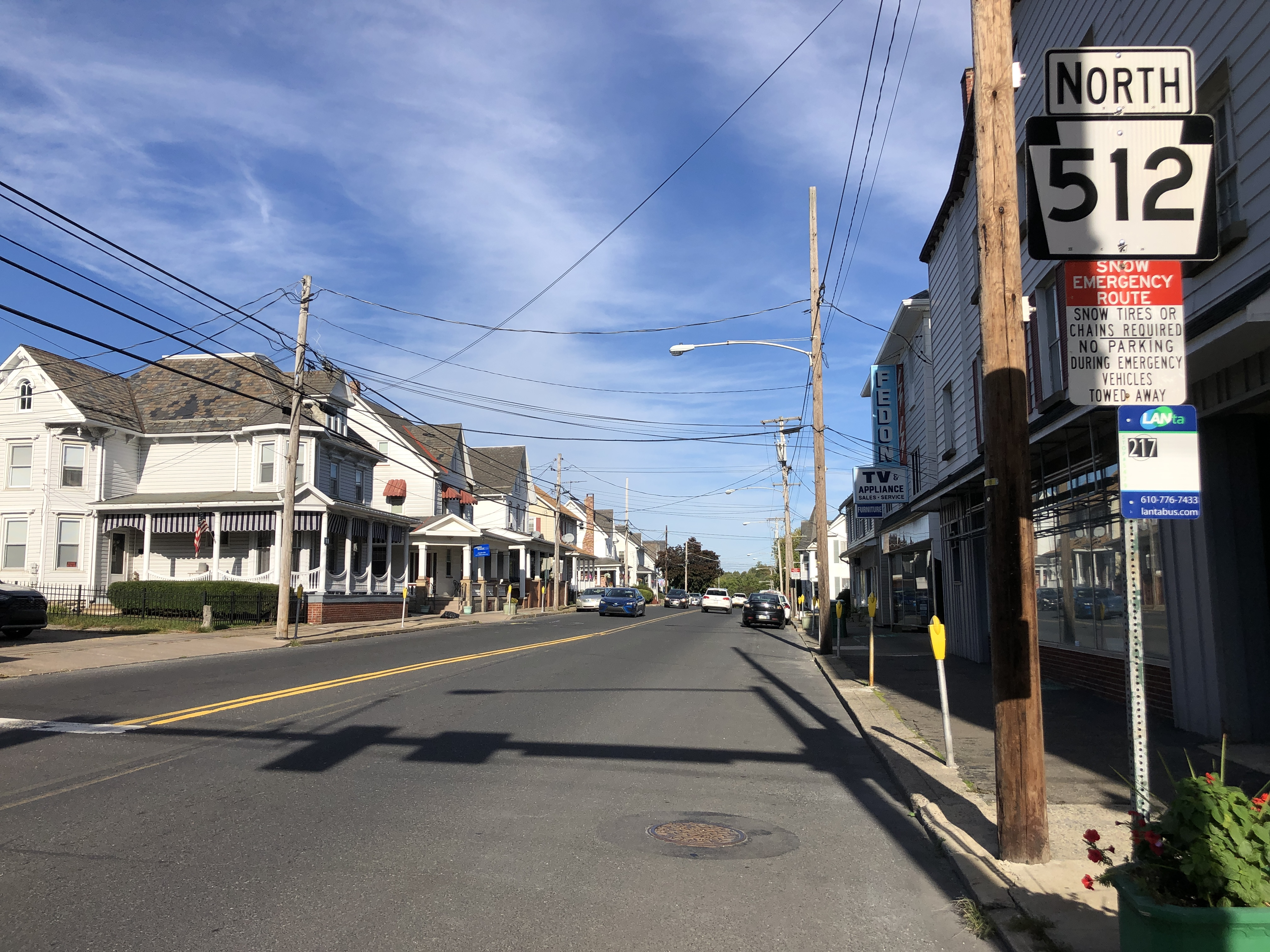
PA Route 512 northbound in Pen Argyl

As of 2020, there were 15.56 miles (25.04 km) of public roads in Pen Argyl, of which 2.77 miles (4.46 km) were maintained by the Pennsylvania Department of Transportation (PennDOT) and 12.79 miles (20.58 km) were maintained by the borough.

Pennsylvania Route 512 is the only numbered highway serving Pen Argyl. It follows Pennsylvania Avenue, Main Street, and Blue Valley Drive along a southwest-northeast alignment through the middle of the borough.

== Demographics ==
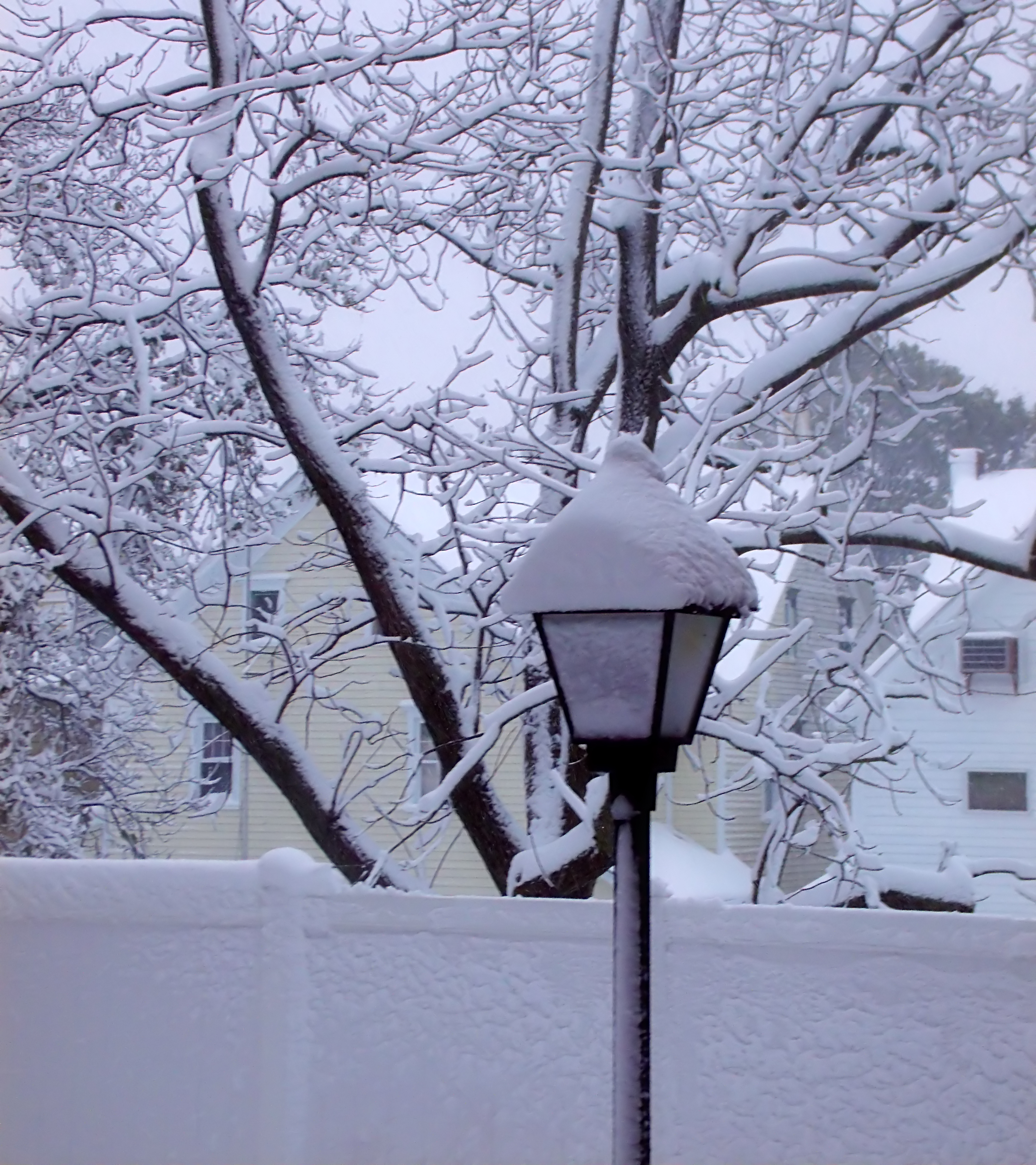
Pen Argyl during a rare October snowstorm in 2011

Historical population
Census	Pop.	Note	%±
1880	572		—
1890	2,108		268.5%
1900	2,784		32.1%
1910	3,967		42.5%
1920	4,096		3.3%
1930	4,310		5.2%
1940	4,059		−5.8%
1950	3,878		−4.5%
1960	3,693		−4.8%
1970	3,668		−0.7%
1980	3,388		−7.6%
1990	3,492		3.1%
2000	3,615		3.5%
2010	3,595		−0.6%
2020	3,510		−2.4%

=== 2020 census ===
As of the 2020 census, Pen Argyl had a population of 3,510. The median age was 39.8 years. 21.7% of residents were under the age of 18 and 16.8% of residents were 65 years of age or older. For every 100 females there were 90.7 males, and for every 100 females age 18 and over there were 88.8 males age 18 and over.

97.2% of residents lived in urban areas, while 2.8% lived in rural areas.

There were 1,399 households in Pen Argyl, of which 33.2% had children under the age of 18 living in them. Of all households, 47.8% were married-couple households, 16.4% were households with a male householder and no spouse or partner present, and 26.4% were households with a female householder and no spouse or partner present. About 24.0% of all households were made up of individuals and 9.7% had someone living alone who was 65 years of age or older.

There were 1,513 housing units, of which 7.5% were vacant. The homeowner vacancy rate was 1.1% and the rental vacancy rate was 8.2%.

Racial composition as of the 2020 census
Race	Number	Percent
White	3,150	89.7%
Black or African American	58	1.7%
American Indian and Alaska Native	4	0.1%
Asian	39	1.1%
Native Hawaiian and Other Pacific Islander	0	0.0%
Some other race	40	1.1%
Two or more races	219	6.2%
Hispanic or Latino (of any race)	204	5.8%

=== 2000 census ===
As of the 2000 census, there were 3,615 people, 1,427 households, and 1,003 families residing in the borough. The population density was 2,603.9 inhabitants per square mile (1,005.4/km^{2}). There were 1,506 housing units at an average density of 1,084.8 per square mile (418.8/km^{2}). The racial makeup of the borough was 99.81% White, 0.07% African American, 0.01% Native American, 0.05% Asian, 0.05% from other races, and 0.80% from two or more races. Hispanic or Latino of any race were 1.22% of the population.

There were 1,427 households, out of which 36.7% had children under the age of 18 living with them, 53.7% were married couples living together, 12.2% had a female householder with no husband present, and 29.7% were non-families. 24.5% of all households were made up of individuals, and 12.6% had someone living alone who was 65 years of age or older. The average household size was 2.52 and the average family size was 3.01.

In the borough, the population was spread out, with 26.7% under the age of 18, 6.9% from 18 to 24, 31.0% from 25 to 44, 20.2% from 45 to 64, and 15.2% who were 65 years of age or older. The median age was 36 years. For every 100 females there were 91.1 males. For every 100 females age 18 and over, there were 86.9 males.

The median income for a household in the borough was $40,066, and the median income for a family was $47,935. Males had a median income of $32,596 versus $23,239 for females. The per capita income for the borough was $18,145. About 4.3% of families and 5.7% of the population were below the poverty line, including 5.7% of those under age 18 and 8.9% of those age 65 or over.

== Education ==
The borough is served by the Pen Argyl Area School District. Students in kindergarten through grade three attend Plainfield Elementary School. Students in grade four through grade eight attend Wind Gap Middle School. Students in grade nine through 12 attend Pen Argyl Area High School.

== Notable locations and events ==
Pen Argyl is the burial place of actress Jayne Mansfield, whose family requested to have her body buried in Fairview Cemetery, located on the borough's outskirts. Her heart-shaped gravestone is visible from the road. It is also home to the Weona Park Dentzel carousel, which is listed in the National Register of Historic Places.

Pen Argyl's Fire Company, Lookout Fire Company #1, holds an annual Labor Day parade and carnival. Pen Argyl is home to Real English Foods, Inc, the company behind Mr. Pastie.

== Notable people ==
- Tripp Eisen, industrial metal guitarist
- Kristen Maloney, former gymnast and Olympian
- Jayne Mansfield, actress who died in a car crash (1933-1967)
- Bob Parsons, former professional football player, Chicago Bears
- Aldo Ray, actor (1926-1991)
- Tighe Scott, former NASCAR and modified driver
- Ryo Tokita, artist
