= Saint Jerome in Penitence =

Saint Jerome in Penitence, the Penitent Saint Jerome and other similar titles may refer to:

- Saint Jerome in Penitence (Antonello da Messina)
- Penitent Saint Jerome with a Young Monk, by Filippo Lippi
- Saint Jerome in Penitence (Lotto, Allentown)
- Saint Jerome in Penitence (Lotto, Paris)
- Saint Jerome in Penitence (Lotto, Rome)
- Saint Jerome in Penitence (Lotto, Sibiu)
- Penitent Saint Jerome (Pontormo)
- Saint Jerome in Penitence (Titian, 1531)
- Saint Jerome in Penitence (Titian, 1552)
- Saint Jerome in Penitence (Titian, 1575)
- Penitent Saint Jerome (Cosmè Tura)

== See also ==
- Saint Jerome in His Study (disambiguation)
- Saint Jerome in the Wilderness (disambiguation)
