= Saint Jerome in His Study =

Saint Jerome in His Study may refer to the following artworks depicting Saint Jerome:

Ordered chronologically

- Saint Jerome in His Study (after van Eyck), a 1442 painting attributed to the workshop of Jan van Eyck
- Saint Jerome in His Study (Colantonio), a c. 1445–1446 painting
- Saint Jerome in His Study (Antonello da Messina), a c. 1474 painting
- Saint Jerome in His Study (Ghirlandaio), a 1480 fresco by Domenico Ghirlandaio
- Saint Jerome in His Study (Dürer), a 1514 engraving by Albrecht Dürer
- St. Jerome in His Study (Dürer, 1521), a painting by Albrecht Dürer
- Saint Jerome in His Study, a 1526 painting by Lucas Cranach the Elder
- Saint Jerome in his Study, a 1541 painting by Marinus van Reymerswaele
- Saint Jerome Writing, or Saint Jerome in His Study, a c. 1605–1606 painting by Caravaggio in Rome
- Saint Jerome Writing (Caravaggio, Valletta), or Saint Jerome in His Study, a c. 1607–1608 painting

== See also ==
- Saint Jerome in Penitence (disambiguation)
- Saint Jerome in the Wilderness (disambiguation)
