= William Suhr =

American art conservator (1896–1984)

William Suhr (March 31, 1896 in Kreuzberg (Ahr) – January 19, 1984 in Mt. Kisco, NY) was an American art conservator who led the conservation department of the Frick Collection from 1935 to 1977.

== Early life ==
Born to Midwestern American citizens living in Germany, William Suhr began his career as an apprentice to a stonemason, "specializing" in stone Madonnas. After three years there, he began studying at the Prussian Academy of Arts, where he met and befriended art historian Max Deri, who introduced him to the art of conservation and restoration. Since there were no formal restoration schools at the time, he was essentially self-taught. Working independently in Berlin, he built up his reputation through collaborations with art dealing firm Thomas Agnew & Sons.

== Career ==
Suhr's success in Berlin caught the attention of Wilhelm Valentiner, formerly of the Kaiser Friedrich Museum, who became director of the Detroit Institute of Arts in 1924. In 1927, Suhr accepted Valentiner's invitation to join him in Detroit, where he continued his conservation practice. He worked there until 1935, at which time Frederick Mortimer Clapp offered him a job as permanent conservator at the Frick Collection in New York City. In this role, he was able to take commissions from the Metropolitan Museum of Art, including an extensive restoration of Robert Campin's Mérode Altarpiece, now housed at The Cloisters.

According to his Frick Collection colleague Edgar Munhall, Suhr's clients included Jules Bache, Alfred Barnes, Mildred Barnes Bliss, Walter Chrysler, Kenneth Clark, Stephen Clark, Chester Dale, Joseph Duveen, 1st Baron Duveen, Edsel Ford, Helen Clay Frick, William Randolph Hearst, Edward James, Samuel Henry Kress, Paul Mellon, John D. Rockefeller Jr., and Georges Wildenstein. Though he dealt primarily with artwork by Old Masters, he also helped conserve works by contemporary artists Salvador Dalí and Lyonel Feininger. Throughout his forty years at the Frick Collection, he kept meticulous records of the conservation procedures he performed, including more than 95 cleaning reports complete with treatment plans, thorough descriptions, and before-and-after photographs.

Suhr retired from the Frick Collection in 1977. He died in 1984, survived by his wife Henriette. His papers are held at the Getty Research Institute. His letters are held at the Archives of American Art.

== Major Restorations ==
- Giovanni Bellini, St. Francis in Ecstasy
- Robert Campin, The Mérode Altarpiece
- Jan van Eyck, St. Jerome in his Study (Jan van Eyck)
- Hans Holbein, Portrait of Sir Thomas More (Holbein)
- Andrea Mantegna, Saint George
- Rembrandt, The Polish Rider
- James McNeill Whistler, Arrangement in Black and Gold: Comte Robert de Montesquiou-Fézensac
