= Saint Augustine in His Study =

Saint Augustine in His Study may refer to:

- Saint Augustine in His Study (Botticelli, Uffizi)
- Saint Augustine in His Study (Botticelli, Ognissanti)
- Saint Augustine in His Study (Carpaccio)
