= Saint Jerome in the Wilderness =

Saint Jerome in the Wilderness or Saint Jerome in the Desert is a common subject in art depicting Jerome. In practice the same subject is often given titles such as Saint Jerome in Penitence and Saint Jerome Praying (see Category:Paintings of Jerome). Versions usually given a "wilderness" or "desert" title include:

- Saint Jerome in the Wilderness (Leonardo), unfinished painting by Leonardo da Vinci, c. 1480
- Saint Jerome in the Wilderness (Dürer) by Albrecht Durer, executed around 1496
- Saint Jerome in the Wilderness (Mantegna) attributed to Andrea Mantegna, c. 1450
- Saint Jerome in the Desert (Pinturicchio) by Pinturicchio, c. 1475–80
- Saint Jerome in the Desert (van der Weyden) by Roger van der Weyden or his studio, c. 1450–1465
- Saint Jerome in the Desert (Bellini, Birmingham), Giovanni Bellini's earliest known work from c. 1450
- Saint Jerome in the Desert (Bellini, Florence), a c. 1480 painting by Bellini
- Saint Jerome in the Desert (Bellini, Washington), a later Bellini painting
- Saint Jerome Reading in a Landscape (Bellini, London), a painting of c. 1480–1485 by Bellini

== See also ==
- The Hermit Saints by Hieronymus Bosch, c. 1493, is also a treatment of this subject.
- Saint Jerome in Penitence (disambiguation)
- Saint Jerome in His Study (disambiguation)
