= Charles Munch =

Charles Munch may refer to:

- Charles Munch (painter) (born 1945), American artist
- Charles Munch (conductor) (1891–1968), orchestral conductor
  - Charles Munch discography
