= Charles Munch (painter) =

American painter (born 1945)

Charles Munch (born 1945) is an American artist.

Munch and his four brothers and sisters, including his twin sister, were raised and attended public schools in Webster Groves, a suburb of St. Louis, Missouri where he was born. They spent summers in Door County, Wisconsin, where Munch was impressed by the clarity of light and color on the shore of Lake Michigan.

After spending two years at Reed College, Portland, Oregon, and beginning his training as an artist with realist painter Willard Midgette, Munch attended the Portland Art Museum School and the New York Studio School of Drawing, Painting and Sculpture. He returned to Reed College and graduated Phi Beta Kappa in 1968, majoring in painting.

Munch apprenticed himself to William Suhr, who was paintings conservator for the Frick Collection in New York City. He worked part-time as a freelance paintings conservator for the next 45 years. In 1970 he and his partner Jane Furchgott began two years of travel, visiting most of the major museums in the United States and western Europe. They finally settled in Sturgeon Bay, Wisconsin, where Munch developed a detailed realistic style of painting.

During the course of six months in 1981, Munch transitioned from his realistic paintings to a style that was brightly colored, formally simplified, and emotionally expressive—a blend of elements including early Italian Renaissance, Post-Impressionism, and Pop Art. His distinctive form of representation uses broad outlines and contrasting interior colors to create luminous light and atmosphere. The deceptively simple forms and large areas of clear color in his paintings combine to create unforgettable icons of psychological drama. His subjects vary, but the emphasis is on northwoods landscapes and the animals and people that inhabit them.

Since 1982 Munch has lived on a remote hilltop near Lone Rock, Wisconsin. He has exhibited extensively, including major exhibitions at the Milwaukee Art Museum, The Chicago Cultural Center, The Madison Museum of Contemporary Art, and retrospectives at the Fairfield Gallery, Sturgeon Bay WI, and the Museum of Wisconsin Art, West Bend WI. He has shown regularly at the Tory Folliard Gallery, Milwaukee; the Abel Contemporary Gallery, Stoughton WI .
