= Gerhard Altenbourg =

- Born: Gerhard Ströch; November 22, 1926; Schnepfenthal, Landkreis Gotha, Thüringen, Germany
- Died: 30 December 1989 (aged 63); Meissen, Landkreis Meißen, Saxony, German
- Resting place: Städtischer Friedhof
- Website: http://www.gerhard-altenbourg.com/

Gerhard Ströch, better known as Gerhard Altenbourg (22 November 1926 – 30 December 1989) was an East German painter, sculptor, and poet.

== Biography ==
Ströch was born in Rödichen-Schnepfenthal in 1926. Ströch painted his first colour pencil drawings and oil paintings while studying under Erich Dietz in the 1940s. From 1948 to 1950 Ströch studied in Weimar at the Hochshule für Baukunst und Bildende Künsteunder under Hans Hoffmann-Lederer. His first solo exhibition was held at the Galerie Springer in Berlin in 1952. Between 1951 and 1962 Ströch would leave most of his works to the gallery. In the mid-1950s he began using Altenbourg as a pseudonym, the name taken from the village of Altenburg. In the later part of the decade Ströch started sculpting, mainly in plaster, metal, and marble. He also began working with woodcuts. He won the Will Grohmann Award in 1968. In 1970 the first retrospective of his works were shown at the Galerie Brusberg in Berlin. Ströch died in a car accident in 1989. Works of his are held in several museums, including the Museum of Modern Art in New York. The largest collection of his works is held in the Lindenau-Museum.
