= Christ Blessing (Bellini, 1500) =

Painting by Giovanni Bellini

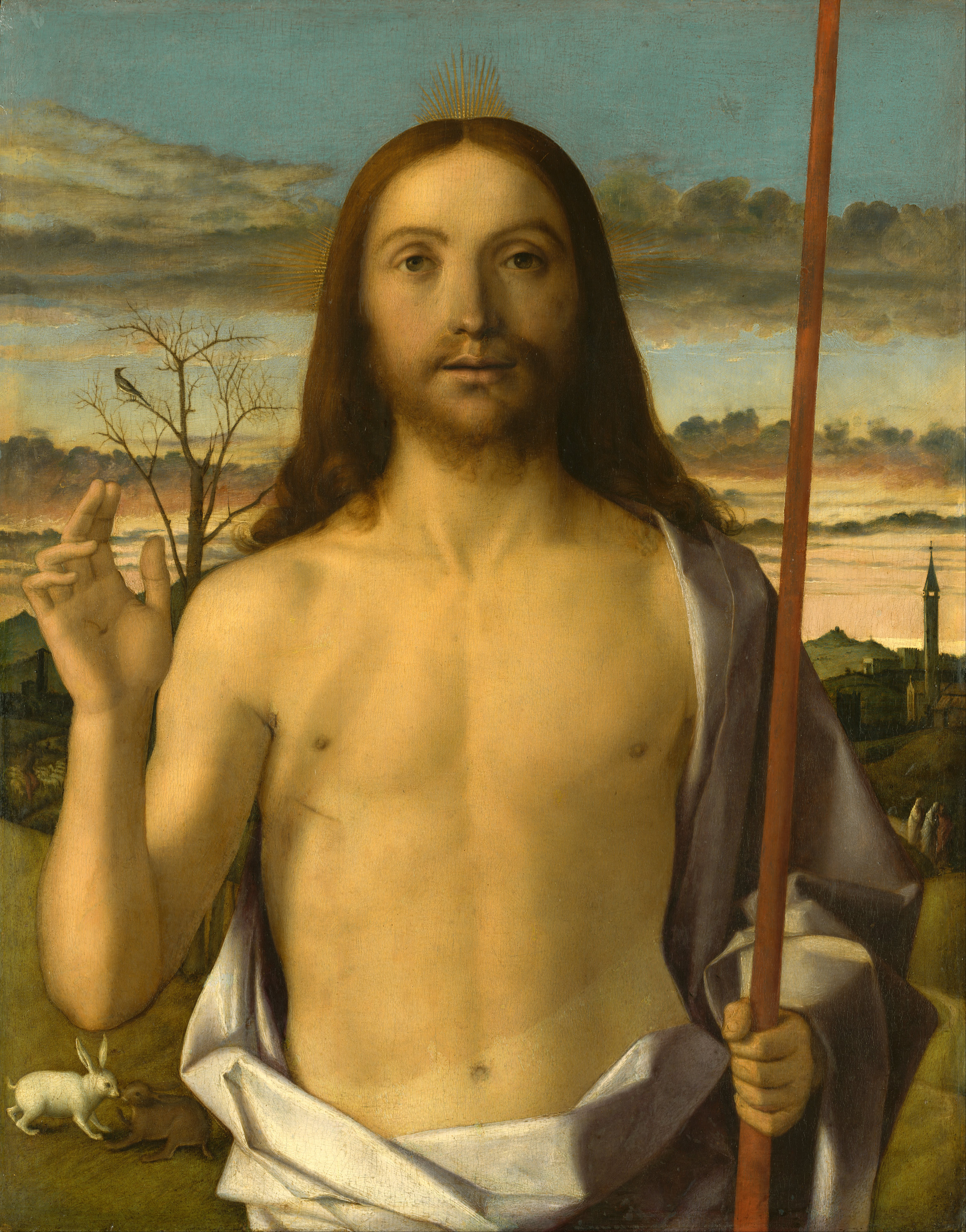
- Artist: Giovanni Bellini
- Year: c. 1500
- Medium: tempera, oil, and gold on panel
- Dimensions: 59 cm × 47 cm (23 in × 19 in)
- Location: Kimbell Art Museum, Fort Worth, Texas

Christ Blessing is a painting by Italian Renaissance master Giovanni Bellini created around the year 1500.

== Analysis ==
The portrait depicts Jesus Christ, raising his right hand while gripping a red staff with the other. Christ's wounds are slightly visible on his hand as well as his chest. The shadows indicate the reality of his Resurrection. Meanwhile, the landscape in the background contains many motifs signifying the Resurrection. The withered tree and solitary bird on the left of the panel represent the Old Covenant, out of which the New Covenant will grow. The pair of rabbits in the lower left corner are symbols of regeneration, and the three robed figures in the lower right corner are the Three Marys. The bell tower in the distance conveys the message that salvation can be found through Christ and the Church. Although the species is not very clear, the bird has been said to be a magpie, a species also featured in Pieter Bruegel the Elder's The Magpie on the Gallows (1568).

== See also ==
- List of works by Giovanni Bellini

== Exhibition ==
The painting is currently held by the Kimbell Art Museum. In January 2017, the painting was displayed at the J. Paul Getty Museum, as part of the "Giovanni Bellini: Landscapes of Faith in Renaissance Venice" exhibition.
