= Pietà (Bellini, Bergamo) =

Painting by Giovanni Bellini

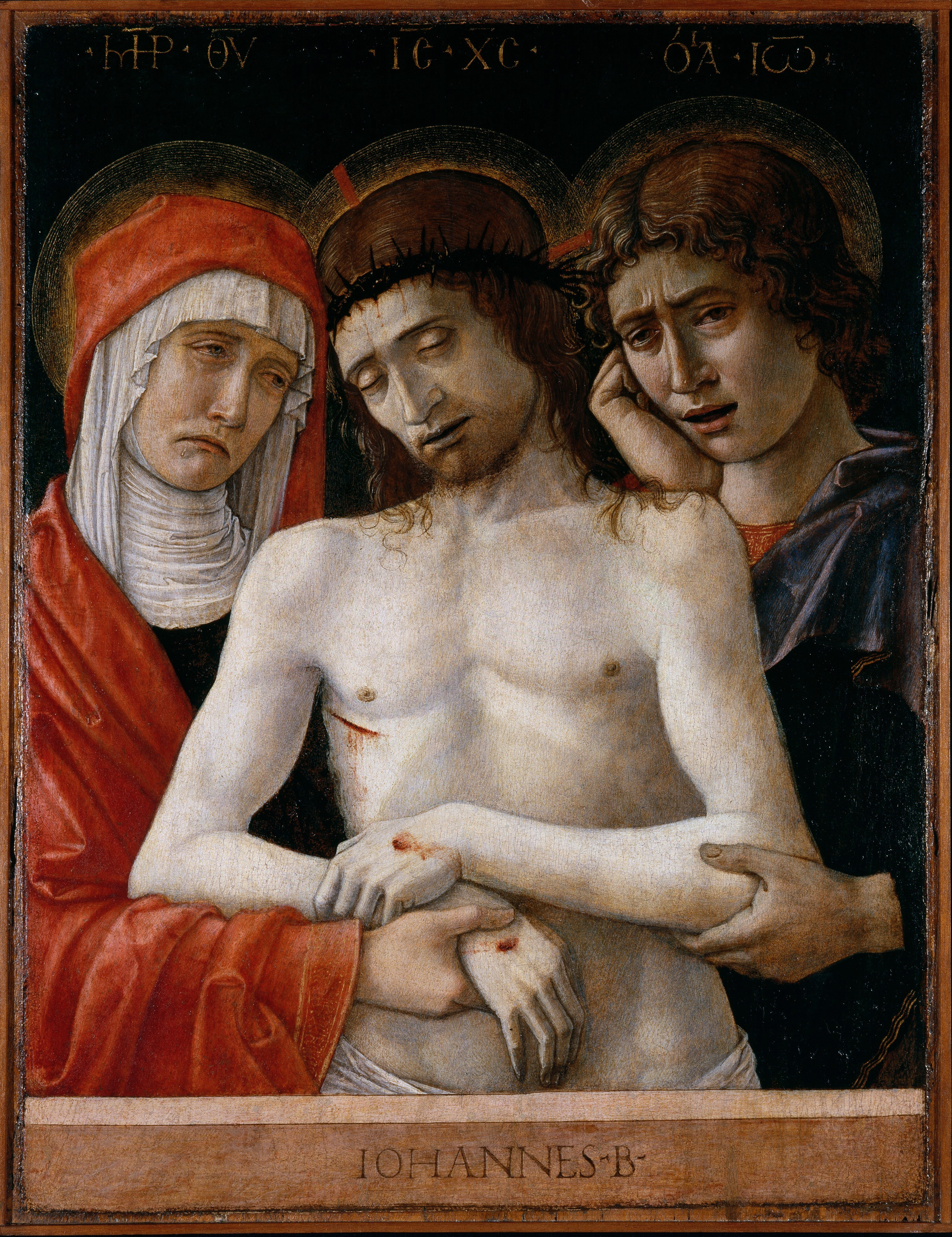
- Artist: Giovanni Bellini
- Year: 1455
- Medium: tempera on panel
- Dimensions: 52 cm × 42 cm (20 in × 17 in)
- Location: Accademia Carrara, Bergamo

The Pietà or Christ's Body Supported by the Virgin Mary and Saint John the Evangelist is a painting in tempera on panel by the Italian Renaissance artist Giovanni Bellini, now in the Accademia Carrara in Bergamo. Dated to around 1455, it is one of his earliest independent works and the prototype for his series of pietàs. It draws on Byzantine icons of the 'imago pietatis', of which there were many examples throughout Venice, and of 'Ritratti di Passione' or 'portraits of the Passion', in which the dead Christ invites the viewer to contemplate his wounds. The crossed arms are drawn from a famous Roman mosaic-icon from Santa Croce in Gerusalemme basilica which was held to be miraculous and had according to legend been commissioned by pope Gregory the Great based on a vision during a mass.

The three figures appear behind a balustrade which bears a (possibly fake) signature by the artist. Above each figure is his or her name in gold Greek letters, further proof of the painting's origins in Venice. Their extreme expressions of grief are unusual in Bellini's oeuvre and may have been influenced by Donatello's reliefs for the high altar of the Basilica of Saint Anthony of Padua. The interlocked gestures were possibly inspired by the followers of Francesco Squarcione, known as the Squarcioneschi, particularly Carlo Crivelli – the influence is so marked that the work was later misattributed to the first Ferrarese School by Arslan.

== See also ==
- List of works by Giovanni Bellini
