= Lindenau-Museum =

Art museum in Germany

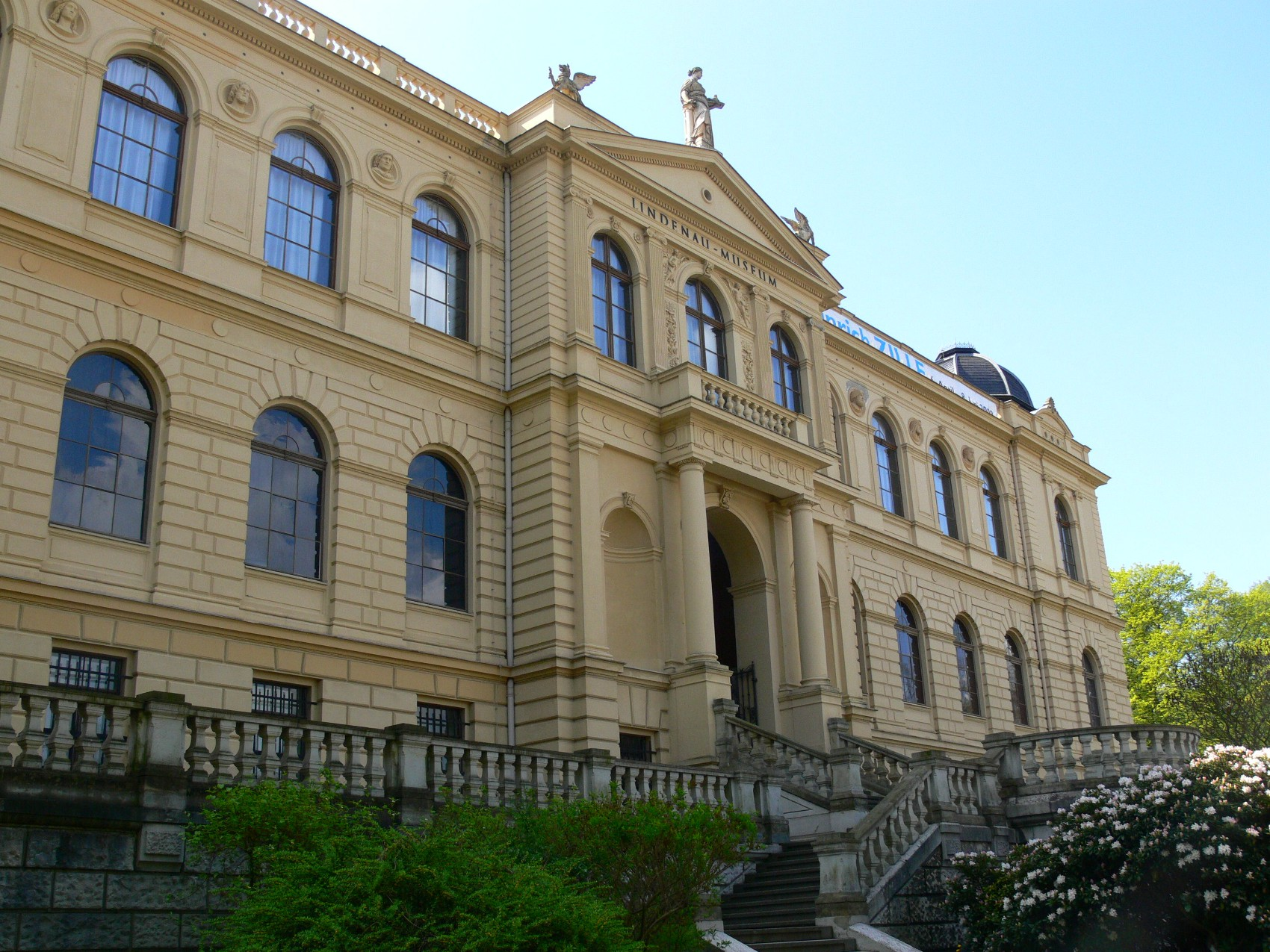
- Lindenau-Museum
- Interactive fullscreen map
- Location: Altenburg, Thuringia, Germany
- Coordinates: 50°59′31″N 12°26′42″E

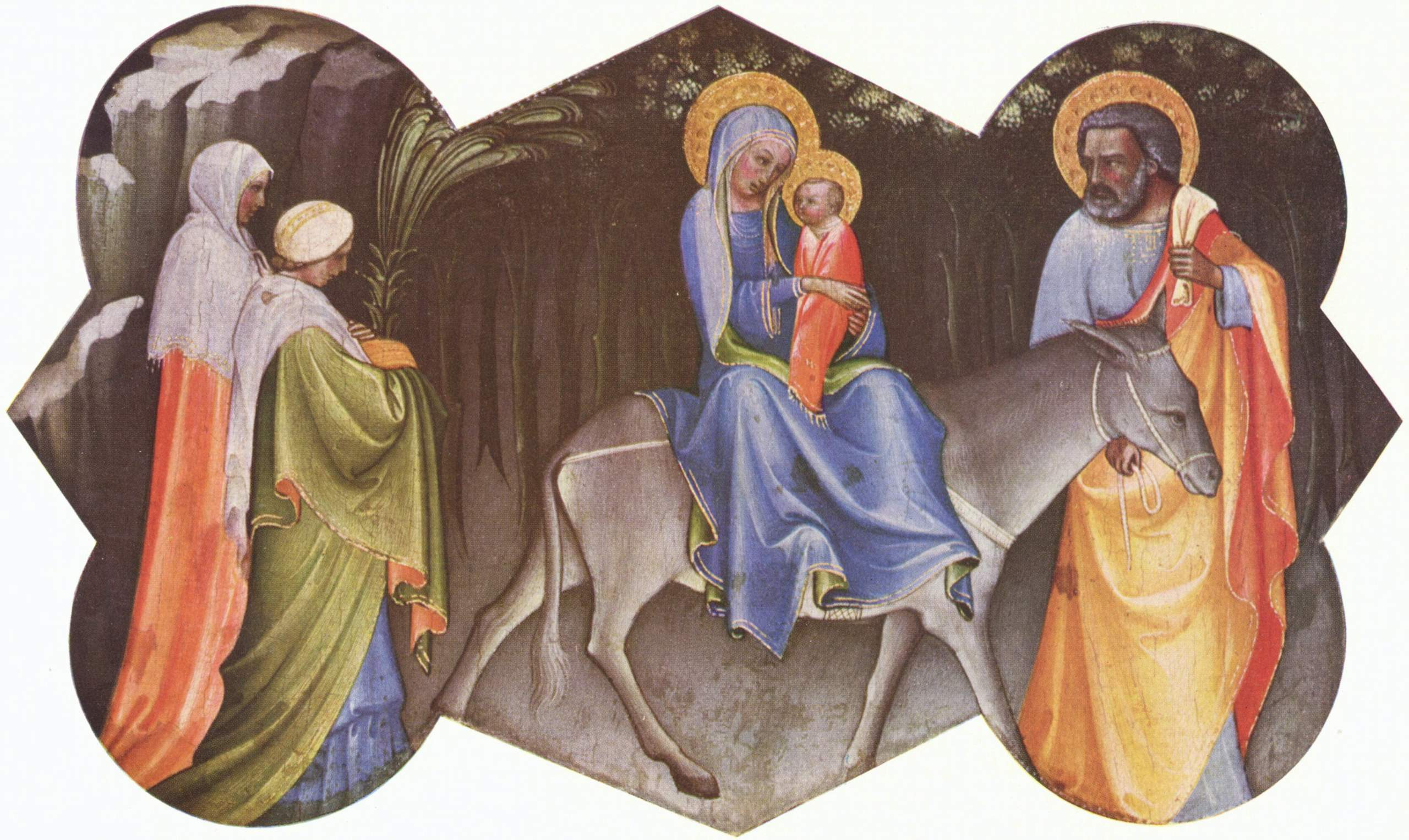
Flight from Egypt by Lorenzo Monaco.

The Lindenau-Museum is an art museum in Altenburg, Thuringia, Germany. It originated as the house-museum of baron and collector Bernhard August von Lindenau. The building was completed in 1876.

The museum's main attraction is its collection of Italian paintings from the late Gothic and early Renaissance age (13th–15th centuries), which are among the largest outside Italy. The artworks include Filippo Lippi's St. Jerome in Penance, Sandro Botticelli's Portrait of Caterina Sforza and a predella panel by Fra Angelico. It also keeps ancient antiquities and modern works, and has a library.

Additionally, there are collections of paintings primarily from the 16th to 19th centuries and asw well the 20th century, that were created in German, Italy, Netherlands and France. After 1945, collections primarily consisted of artwork created by artists from Berlin, Chemnitz, Dresden, and Leipzig. The art of the 1920s and classical modernism are emphasized in painting and graphic design. One of the most extensive collections of illustrated portfolios of late Expressionism and New Objectivity can be found in the graphic Collection. The museum also has the largest collection of works created by Gerhard Altenbourg (1926–1989) in the entire globe.

The museum is a member of the Konferenz Nationaler Kultureinrichtungen, a union of more than twenty cultural institutions in the former East Germany.

The Lindenau-Museum in Gabelentzstraße has been under renovation since January 2020. Since July 2020, a small selection of artworks has been temporarily on exhibit in an interim location at Kunstgasse 1 in Altenburg, while special exhibitions are on display in the Prinzenpalais of the Altenburg Residential Palace.

Since October 2020, the Lindenau-Museum is part of the “Altenburger Museen”, a communal collaboration between the Lindenau-Museum Altenburg and the Altenburg Residential Palace.

== Architecture ==
The Lindenau-Museum building adheres to the architectural tradition of 19th-century picture galleries, which were a distinct type of museum structure. The prototype for this style was created by Leo von Klenze with the Alte Pinakothek in Munich. What defines this “museum building style” is the reception of the palace building of the Italian High Renaissance in the sense of an art historical ideal that should be expressed in a new, representative and functional museum architecture. The immediate model for the Lindenau Museum was the Dresden Picture Gallery, built according to plans by Gottfried Semper. Semper adopted the basic architectural concept from the Alte Pinakothek but introduced a decisive internal symmetry with a central octagonal rotunda. When constructing the Lindenau Museum, Julius Robert Enger, a senior building inspector from Altenburg and a student of Semper, clearly referred to his teacher's Dresden model. Enger succeeded in creating a museum building that is significantly simplified in both material and architectural terms and yet impresses with its palatial overall effect and compositional balance.

== Sources ==
- Jena, Klaus; Ingeborg Titz-Matuszak; Miklos Boskovits (1998). 150 anni del Lindenau-Museum Altenburg. ISBN 3-86104-032-8.
