= Saint Francis in Ecstasy (Bellini) =

Painting by Giovanni Bellini

- Artist: Giovanni Bellini
- Year: c. 1480
- Medium: Oil on panel
- Dimensions: 124.6 cm × 142 cm (49.1 in × 56 in)
- Location: Frick Collection, New York

Saint Francis in Ecstasy (or Saint Francis in the Desert) is a painting by Italian Renaissance master Giovanni Bellini, started in 1475 and completed around 1480. Bellini depicted the religious figure of Saint Francis of Assisi in a landscape. In 1852, the painting was listed on June 19 at Christie's. It was part of the 1857 Manchester Art Treasures exhibition. In 1915, Henry Clay Frick bought the painting for $170,000, and it remains in the Frick Collection, in New York City.

== Subject ==
The painting portrays Francis of Assisi, the Italian saint of the early 13th century, in an Italian landscape, stepping out in the sun from his cave, his figure anchoring the creamy celadon and golden-green landscape. The oil painting by Bellini has a length of approximately four feet with a width of around four and a half feet, depicting a natural, but dramatic scene. This painting includes one of the largest and most extensive Renaissance landscapes.

== Description ==
The painting contains a strong effect of mystical light through the use of golden rays coming from the uppermost left corner of the painting, showering over Saint Francis. The tones of brown and gold are used to illustrate the body, and a rocky niche is depicted in the shady portion. His brighter body contrasts with the darker environment of the painting. In the foreground, the focus is on a stony, dangerous, dark, and mossy cave with a shady entrance covered by twisted grapevines. Inside the cave, several possessions of the saint are represented, including a Holy Book, desk, hermit's skull, a thorny crown, and a crucifix made of stems. Although the scene is rocky, it does not look infertile. In the center and the background of this painting is a walled hill with growing fields, a bridge over a running waterway, a coastal bird similar to a gray heron, a donkey, as well as a shepherd looking at his flock grazing. The landscape depicts a transformation into spring through the inclusion of growing grass.

In the painting, the sky is dynamic, sparkling, and bright blue. From the uppermost left edge, the light is falling, making its way inside the scenery. There is an illuminated feel arising from the whole painting, and a sense of rays originating from stones and green fields, making it seem as if, through the holiness of Saint Francis, the world is being illuminated. The painting depicts Saint Francis having come out of his cave in a brown traditional robe, standing barefooted, looking upwards at paradise with widely opened arms and heaving chest. The rocks around him in the painting are converting into a stream, implying that his life has just transformed. In the painting, a mystical light is showered over Saint Francis; he seems to be absorbing this light and spreading it throughout the entire painting.

=== Materials ===
In Saint Francis in Ecstasy, Bellini used a combination of oil and tempera paints, perhaps having been under the influence of Antonello da Messina.The painting shows the influence of Andrea Mantegna, who was the painter's brother-in-law. It is signed IOANNES BELLINVS on a small, creased tag visible in the lower-left corner. The original size of the painting was cut-down from the top side; this is evident because the painting continues completely to the end of the panel. However, the original painting would not be much larger than the present by estimation. Saint Francis in Ecstasy was directed towards Art Museum Metropolitan for detailed cleaning and highly technical assessment of this painting by Scientists, Art Masters and Conservators, the painting had evidence of underdrawings. The major findings such as compositional modifications, fingerprints, brushwork, sketching and the exposure of certain innovation belongs to the students of Bellini, i.e. Titian and Giorgione. Though it has been cut down, it has otherwise been well-cared for since its creation.

== Symbolism ==
Bellini became sophisticated in his painting skill in the fifteenth century, the culmination of which is the Saint Francis In Ecstasy. The moment being depicted in the painting is Saint Francis's stigmatization on the mountain of La Verna. Bellini envisioned the stigmatization as a moment of human transformation into the divine. The sun's rays shine on Saint Francis, symbolizing him as a Seraph-Crucifix in front of the sun, which indicates the suffering image of the Seraphim.

Francis lived under poor conditions during his later life and ministry and participated in isolated spiritual retreats at monasteries, as the painting shows; however, this painting is likely a symbolic representation of the saint. The animals in the picture may represent the saint's love for nature and animals. The work depicts Saint Francis in a religious ecstasy – perhaps receiving the stigmata, as Millard Meiss has suggested, though depictions of that episode usually also show an angel, a seraph or a crucifix emitting rays. Alternatively, he may be praying or perhaps singing his Canticle of the Sun, as Richard Turner has argued.

Whatever the specific moment portrayed may be, the representation is a fresh one and does not follow any of the established iconographic motifs. In the left middle-ground is a donkey which can be interpreted as a symbol of humility and patience. In the lower right corner on a rustic reading table is a skull, representing mortality, welcomed in the last stanza of the saint's Canticle. The cave may relate Francis to Saint Jerome, who also lived in a cave or cell. The stream in the left middle-ground symbolizes Moses and the great spring, while the barren tree in the center of the painting represents the Burning Bush. The saint has left his wooden pattens behind and stands barefoot like Moses.

On the green banks are a few bindweeds that open at the dawn and fade away at day's end. The small garden contains various types of medicinal plants, such as orris and mullein or Jacob's staff, and juniper. One of two fig trees is on the right-hand side of Saint Francis as leaves begin to sprout from a branch of the tree. The second fig tree is on the cliff surrounded by fruit. Each tiny flower represents Saint Francis as he embraced poverty, prayer and humility. The painting represents not only the saint's stigmatization but also the Canticle of the Sun, a song he composed which appreciates God's creation of nature. The overall message displayed conveys Bellini's praises of the kingdom of God's creation.

Details

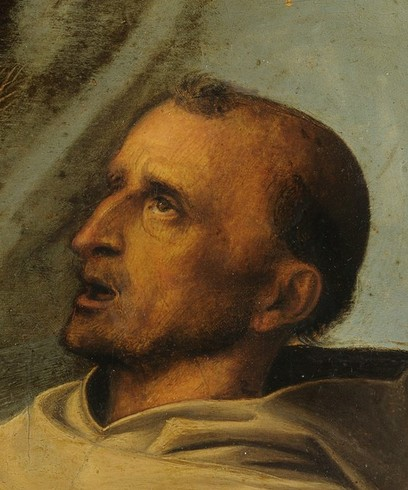
Head of Saint Francis

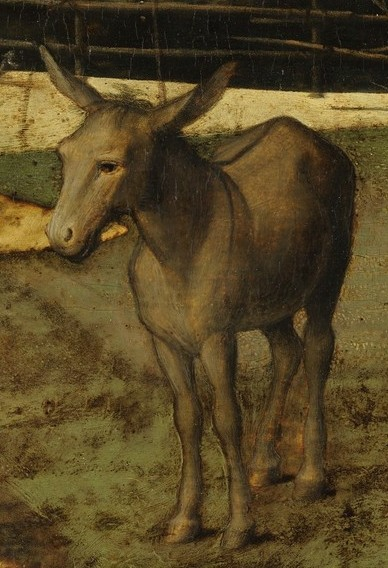
Donkey

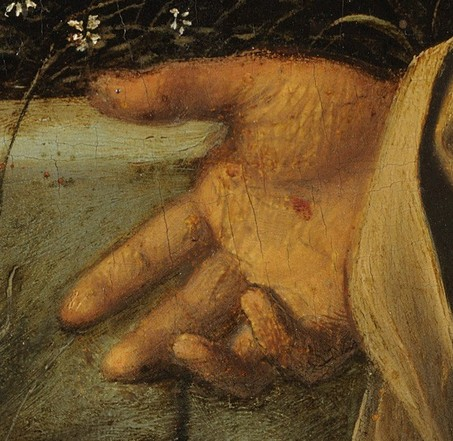
Stigmata, right hand

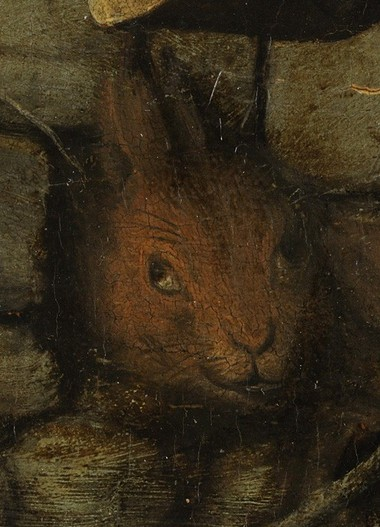
Hare

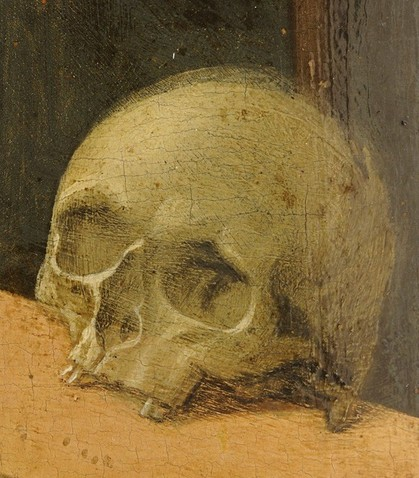
Skull

=== Landscape ===
The overall composition is thought to be a meditation of Saint Francis on the creation of the world as related in the Book of Genesis. In the distance rises the still empty Heavenly Jerusalem. Francis took refuge in Mount La Verna, a deserted place in the Apennines, outside of Arezzo, Tuscany.

== Provenance ==
Zuan Michiel commissioned the Saint Francis in Ecstasy from Bellini in the 1480s. Taddeo Contarini acquired the painting after Zuan Michiel's death. In 1660, Bellini's Saint Francis was mentioned in Marco Boschini's dialect poem, after Boschini saw the painting in Giulio Guistiniani’s palace. At the end of the eighteenth century, the picture was still in the Cormaro Palace, according to Abbate Lanzi. The painting might have left Venice for the first time at some point between 1796 and 1852. It was offered for sale at Christie's on 19 June 1852 and claimed to have originally been made for "a convent in the Milanese". The painting was bought by Thomas Holloway, and were inherited by his sister-in-law, whose estate sold them to Knoedler and P & D Colnaghi in 1912.

In 1915, the painting entered the Frick Collection in New York City, displayed prominently in what was the living room of Henry Clay Frick, an American industrialist, financier, and art patron. Frick had acquired the painting even though he had little interest in religious paintings, but he valued this painting for its extensive landscape. The painting remains in the Frick Collection and is considered one of its finest assets. The painting is in excellent condition. The painting was included in the 1857 Manchester Art Treasures exhibition.

== See also ==
- List of works by Giovanni Bellini
