= Penitent Saint Jerome with a Young Monk =

Painting by Filippo Lippi

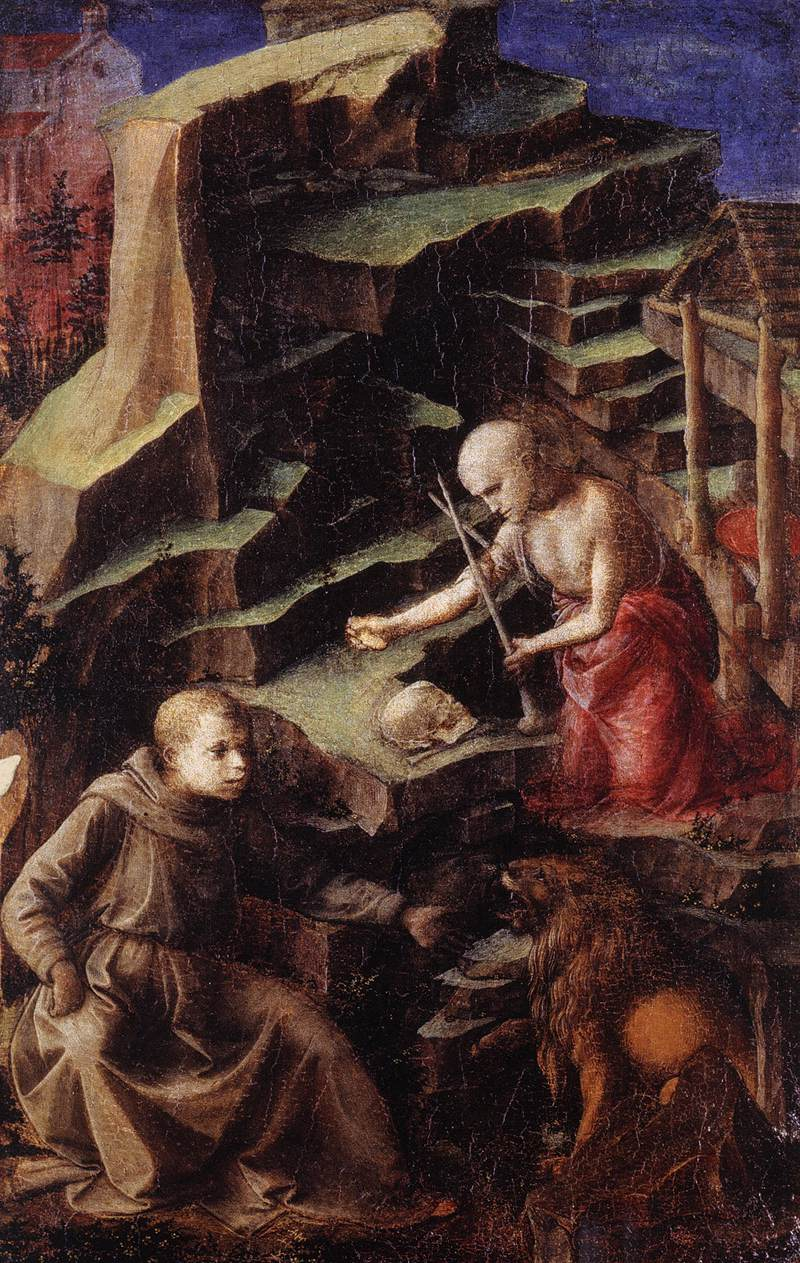
- Artist: Filippo Lippi
- Year: c. 1439
- Medium: Tempera on panel
- Dimensions: 53 cm × 37 cm (21 in × 15 in)
- Location: Lindenau-Museum, Altenburg

The Penitent Saint Jerome with a Young Monk (also known as St. Jerome in penance and San Gerolamo in penitenza) is a painting by the Italian Renaissance painter Filippo Lippi, dated c. 1439. It is housed in the Lindenau-Museum of Altenburg, Germany. The work could be identified with the Saint Jerome Penitent of which Lippi asked payment in a letter issued to Piero de' Medici in 1439.

The painting is one of the first known examples on the subject of Saint Jerome doing penance. It is a small panel, divided into two different scenes: in the upper part is Saint Jerome with the wooden cross, the stone to strike his breast and the lectern lying on the rock. In the lower part, with a chronological step, is the episode of the saint with the lion having a thorn in the paw. The unfriendly landscape is a metaphor of the hermit style of life.
