= Giovanni Bellini =

Italian Renaissance painter (c. 1430 – 1516)

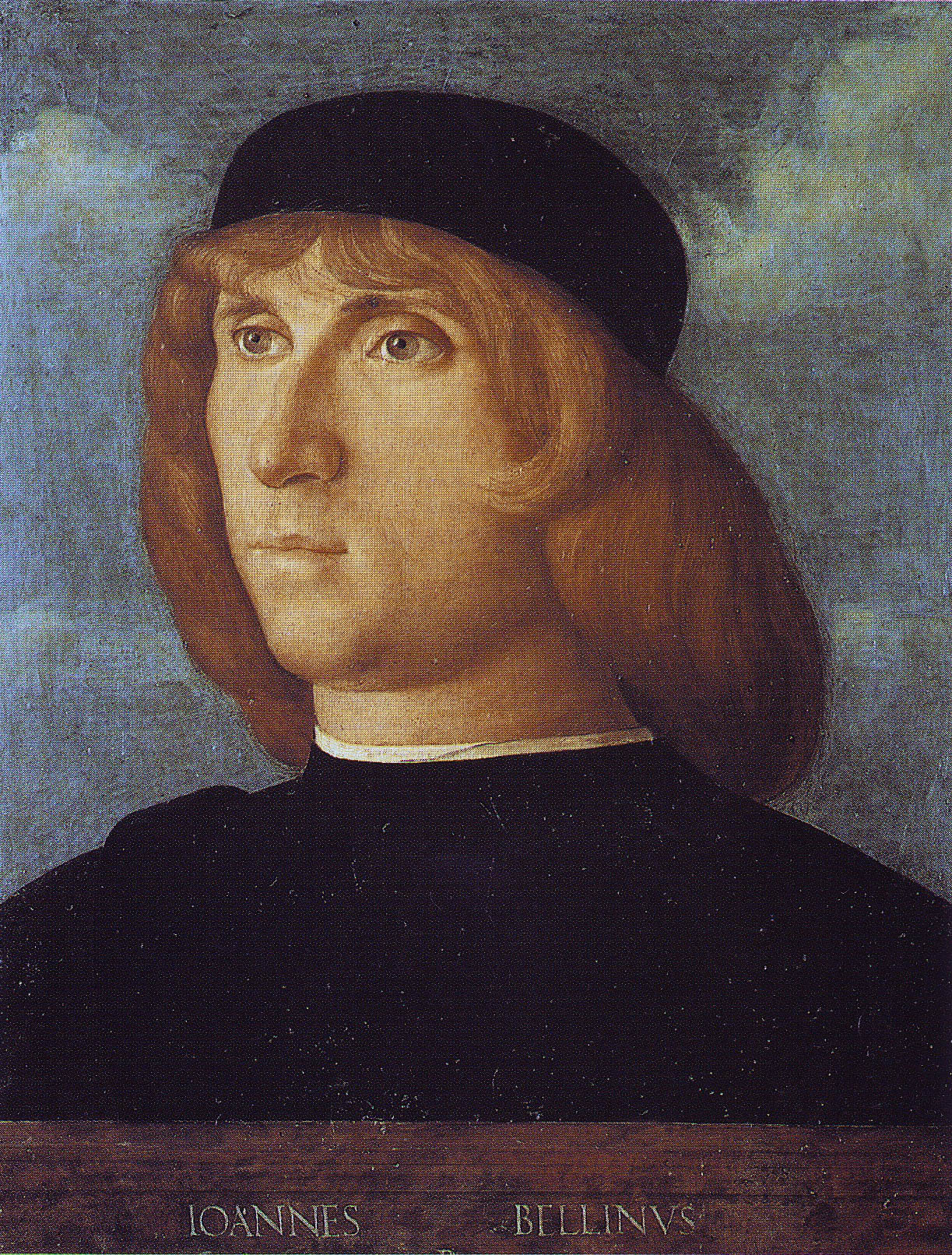
- Presumed self-portrait, c. 1500, Musei Capitolini (Rome)
- Born: c. 1430; Venice, Republic of Venice (now Veneto, Italy)
- Died: 29 December 1516; Venice, Republic of Venice (now Veneto, Italy)
- Known for: Painting
- Notable work: The Feast of the Gods
- Movement: Venetian Renaissance

Signature
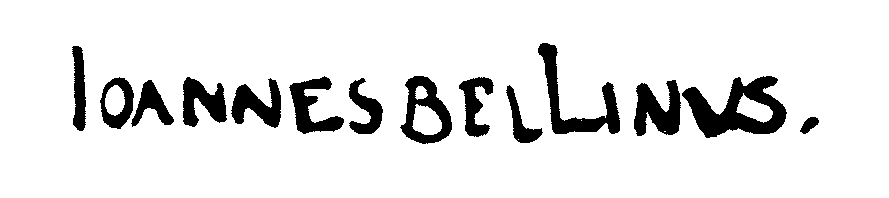

Giovanni Bellini (Italian: [dʒoˈvanni belˈliːni]; Venetian: Zuane Belin ; c. 1430 – 29 December 1516) was an Italian Renaissance painter, probably the best known of the Bellini family of Venetian painters. He was raised in the household of Jacopo Bellini, formerly thought to have been his father, but now that familial generational relationship is questioned. An older brother or perhaps nephew, Gentile Bellini, was more highly regarded than Giovanni during his lifetime, but the reverse is true today. His brother-in-law was Andrea Mantegna.

Giovanni Bellini's use of clear, slow-drying oil paints had a great effect on the Venetian painting school, especially on his pupils Giorgione and Titian. The Bellini cocktail is named in his honour.

== Life ==
=== Early career ===
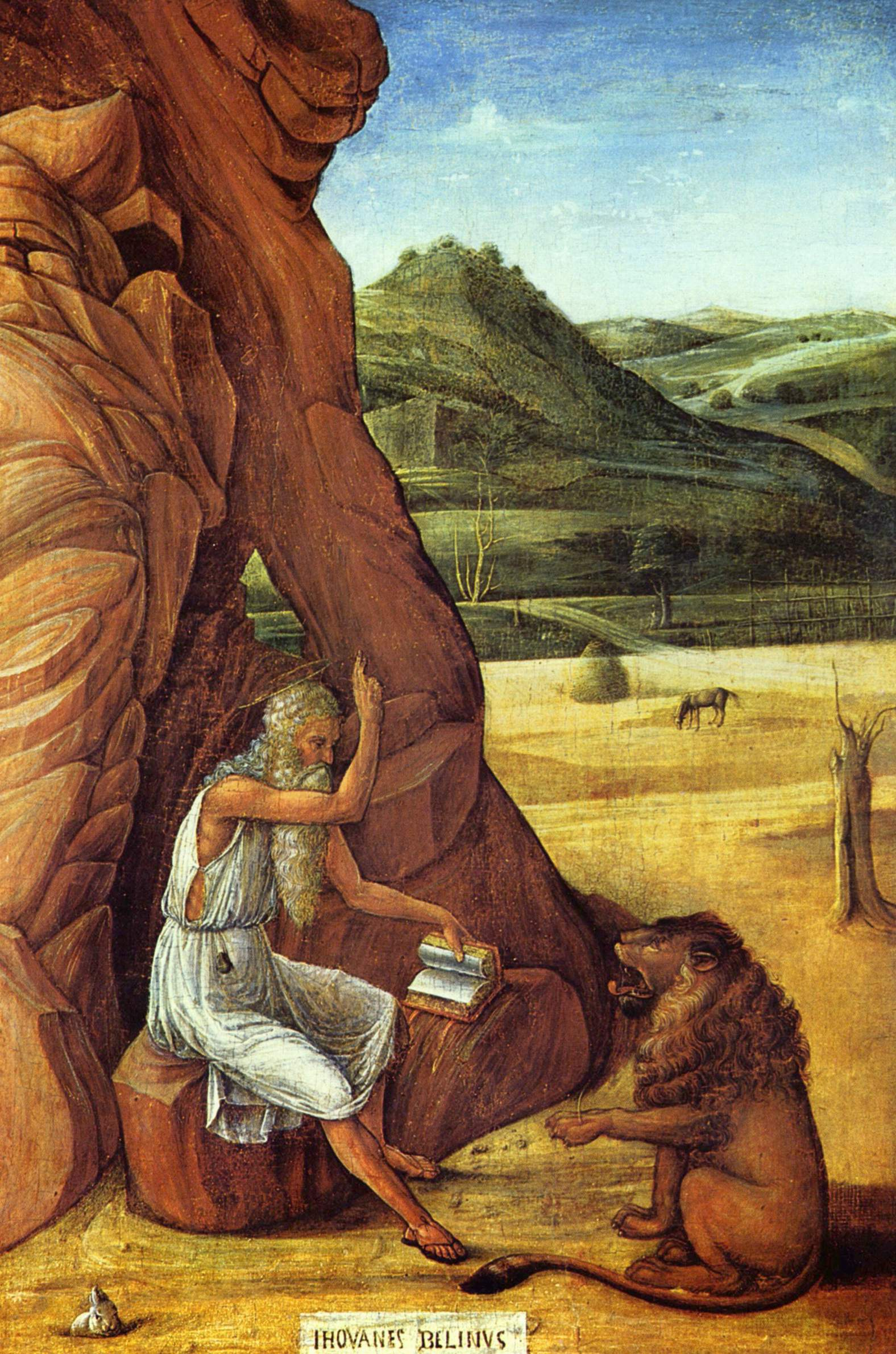
St. Jerome in the Desert, c. 1455; Tempera on panel; Barber Institute, Birmingham

Giovanni Bellini was born in Venice. The painter Jacopo Bellini had long been considered Giovanni's father, but art historian Daniel Wallace Maze claims that Jacopo was his much elder half-brother, and that Gentile Bellini was his nephew rather than his brother. He lived and worked closely with his brother Gentile. His early paintings are all executed in the old tempera method.

His Dead Christ paintings (one of his most frequent themes, e.g. Dead Christ Supported by the Madonna and St. John, or Pietà) feature less harshness of contour and a broader treatment of forms and drapery. Giovanni's early work is often linked compositionally and stylistically to the work of Andrea Mantegna, his brother-in-law.

In 1470, Giovanni received his first commission to work with Gentile and other artists in the Scuola di San Marco, where, among other subjects, he painted a Deluge with Noah's Ark.

=== Maturity ===
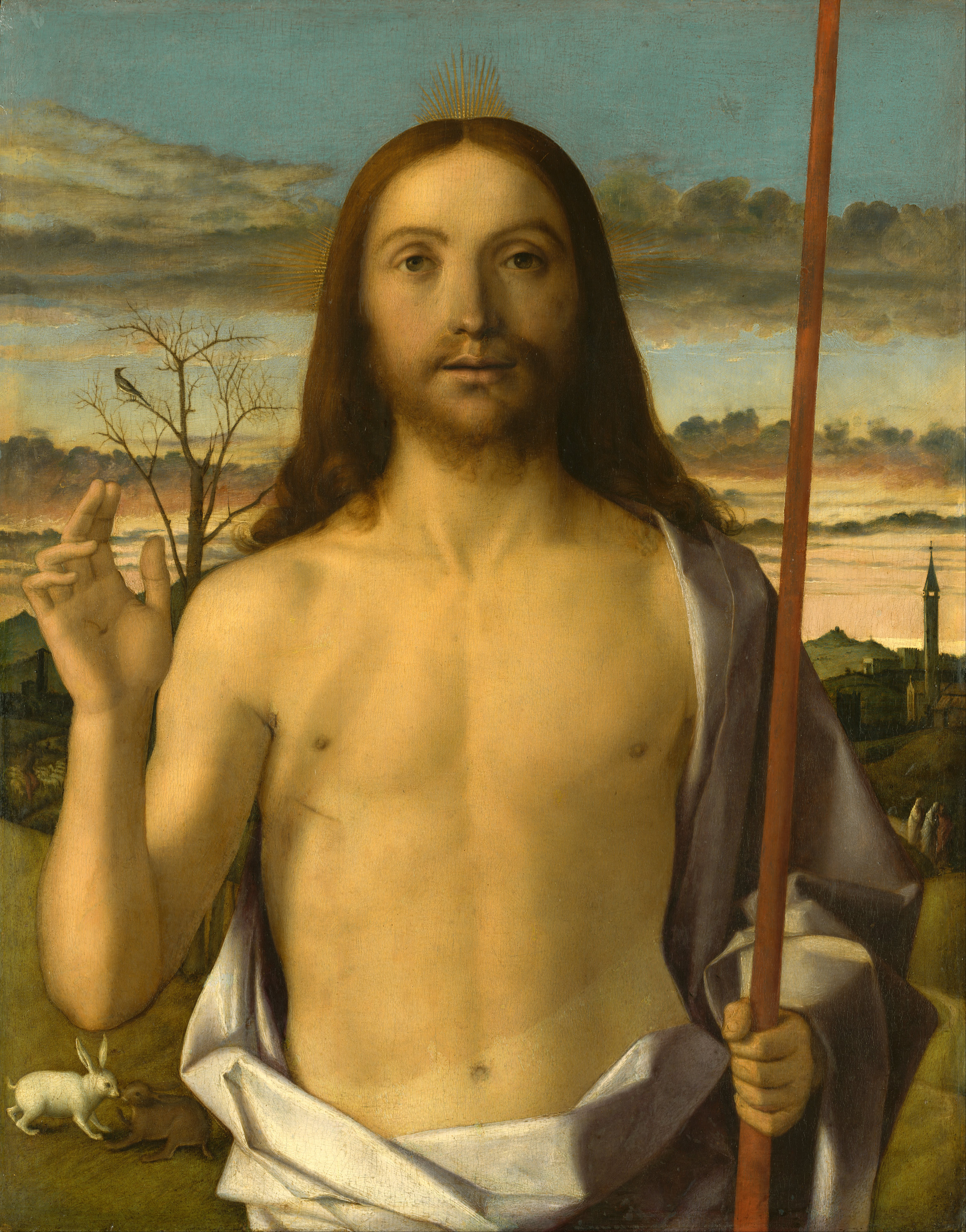
Christ Blessing, 1500; Tempera, oil, and gold on panel, Kimbell Art Museum, Texas

His Transfiguration is now in the Capodimonte Museum of Naples, was probably painted after 1470, exhibiting greater artistic mastery than his early work in Venice.

Also likely from this period is the altarpiece of the Coronation of the Virgin at Pesaro, which would seem to be his earliest effort in a form of art previously almost monopolised in Venice by the rival school of the Vivarini.

Many of Giovanni's public works are now lost. His altarpiece, painted in tempera for a chapel in the church of S. Giovanni e Paolo, was destroyed along with Titian's Peter Martyr and Tintoretto's Crucifixion in the fire of 1867.

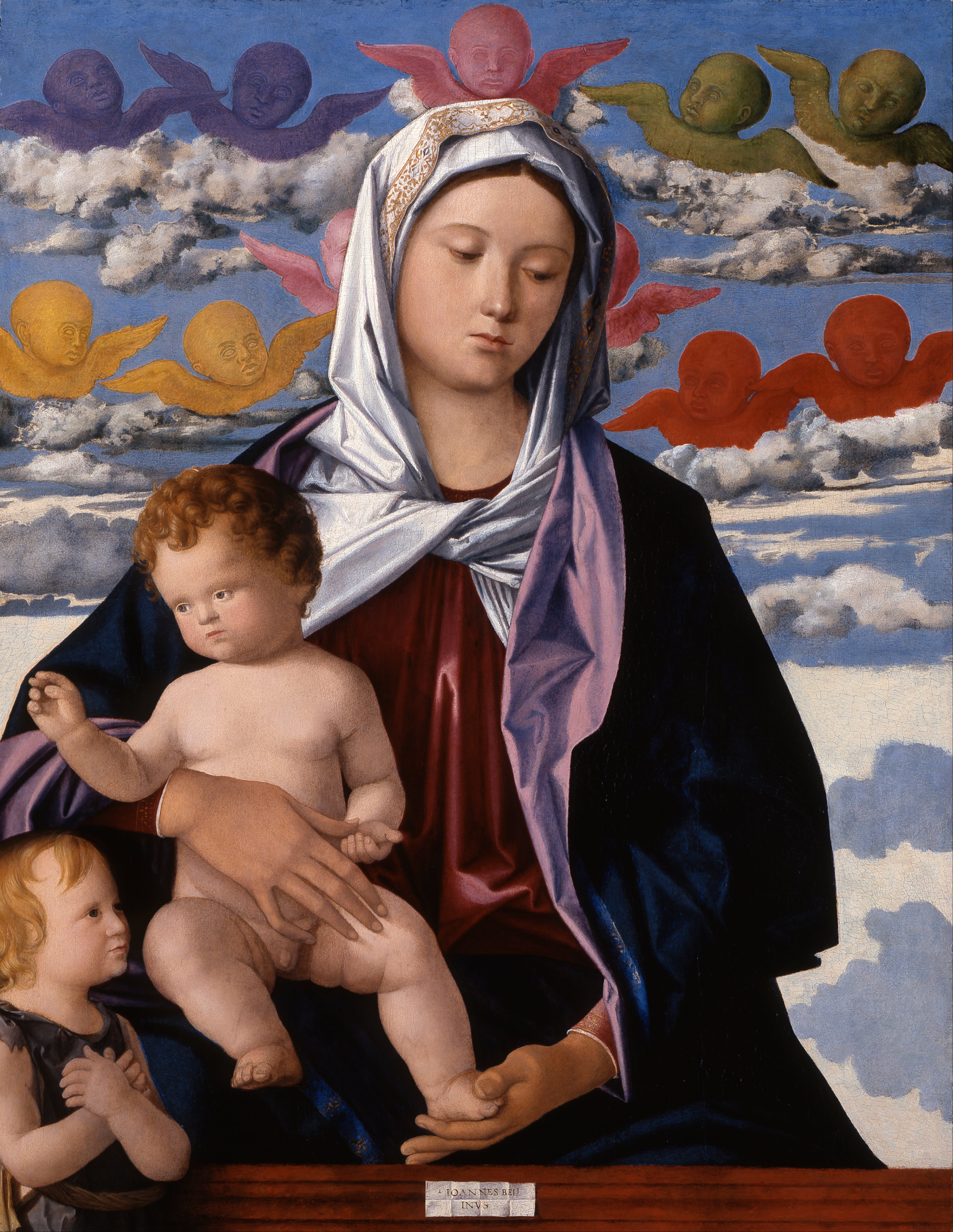
Madonna and Child with the Infant St. John the Baptist, c. 1480; oil; Indianapolis Museum of Art

After 1479–1480, much of Giovanni's time and energy were devoted to his duties as conservator of the paintings in the great hall of the Doge's Palace. The importance of this commission can be measured by the payment Giovanni received: he was awarded, first the reversion of a broker's place in the Fondaco dei Tedeschi, and afterwards, as a substitute, a fixed annual pension of eighty ducats. Besides repairing and renewing the works of his predecessors, he was commissioned to paint a number of new subjects, six or seven in all, in further illustration of the part played by Venice in the wars of Frederick Barbarossa and the pope. Executed with much interruption and delay, not a trace of these works survived the fire of 1577; neither have any other examples of his historical and processional compositions come down.

Of the other, the religious class of his work, including both altarpieces with many figures and simple Madonnas, a considerable number have been preserved. They show him gradually throwing off the last restraints of the Quattrocento manner; gradually acquiring greater use of the new oil medium introduced in Venice by Antonello da Messina about 1473, and mastering with its help all, or nearly all, the blending of colours and atmospheric gradation of tones. These works gradually became more restrained over time. The enthroned Virgin and Child (such as the one at left) become tranquil and commanding in their sweetness; the personages of the attendant saints gain in power, presence and individuality; groups of singing and viol-playing angels symbolise and complete the harmony of the scene. Venetian colour is used throughout the figures, architecture, landscape and sky.

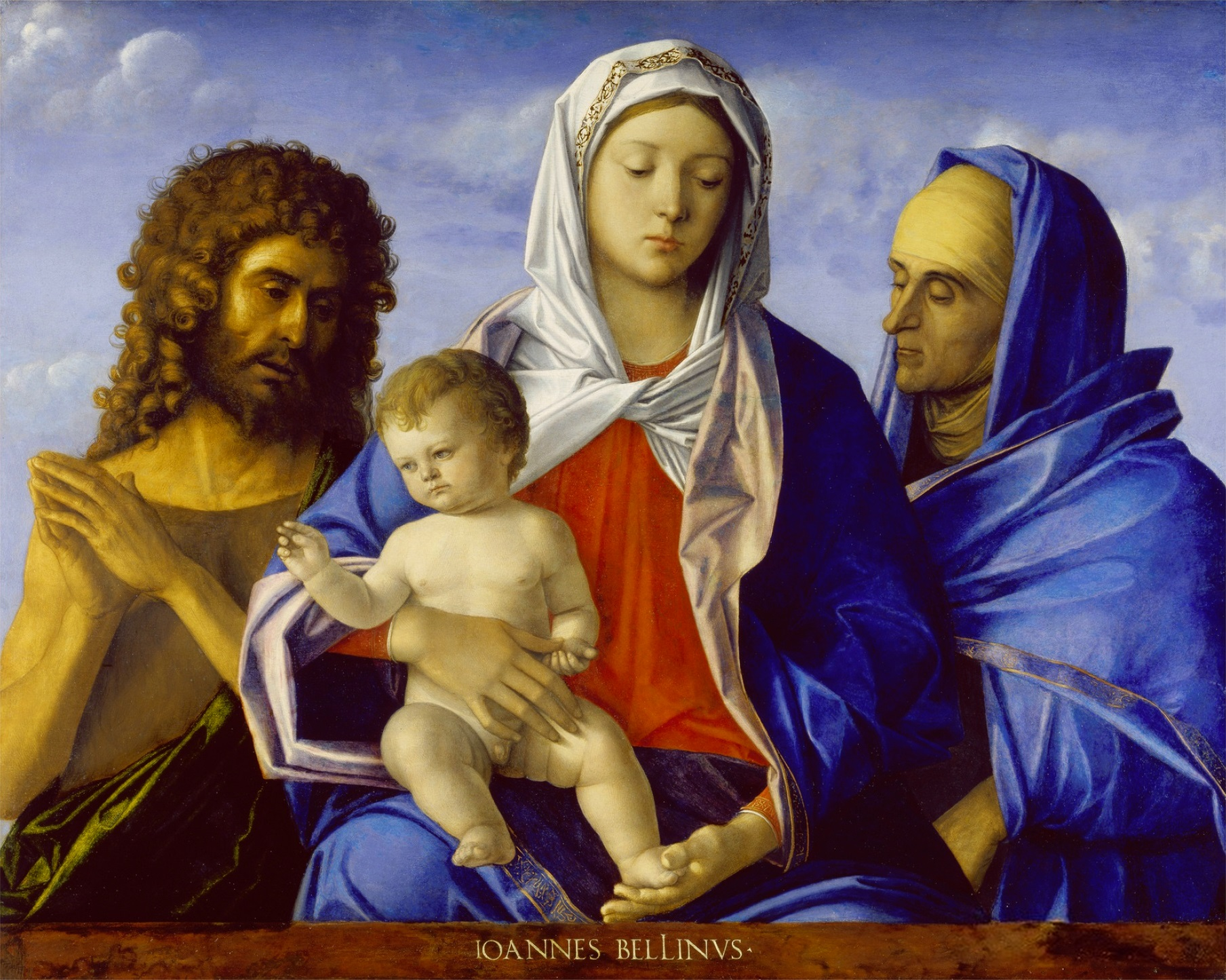
Madonna and Child with John the Baptist and Saint Elizabeth, c. 1490-1500, Städel Museum, Frankfurt

An interval of some years, no doubt chiefly occupied with work in the Hall of the Great Council, seems to separate the San Giobbe Altarpiece, and that of the church of San Zaccaria at Venice. Formally, the works are very similar, and a comparison between them serves to illustrate the shift in Bellini's work over the last decade of the fifteenth century. Both paintings are of the Holy Conversation (sacred conversation between the Madonna and Saints) type. Both show the Madonna seated on a throne (thought to allude to the throne of Solomon), between classicising columns. Both place the holy figures beneath a golden mosaicked half dome that recalls the Byzantine architecture in the basilica of St. Mark.

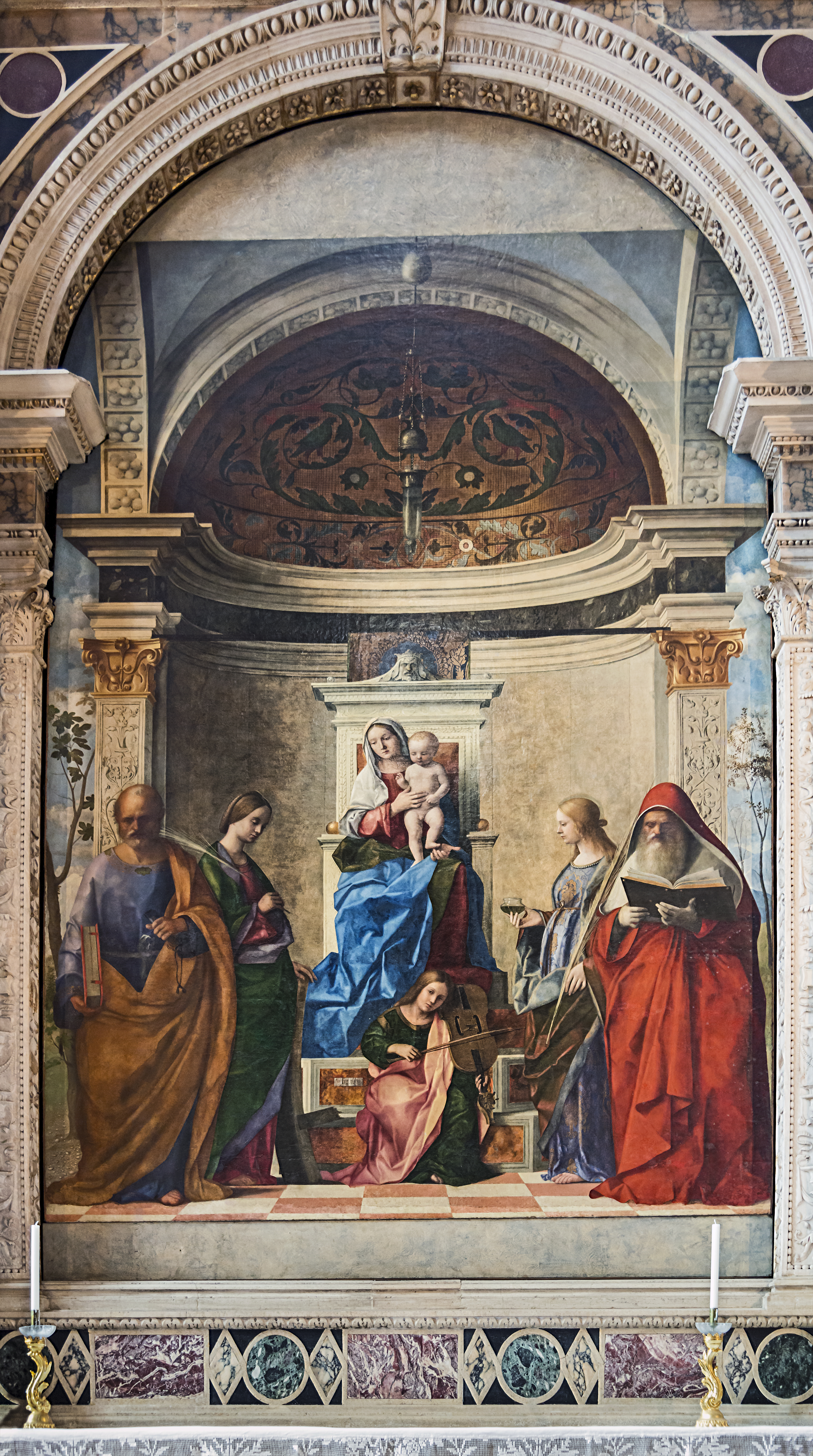
San Zaccaria Altarpiece, 1505; oil on canvas, transferred from panel; San Zaccaria, Venice

In the later work, Bellini depicts the Virgin surrounded by (from left): St. Peter holding his keys and the Book of Wisdom; the virginal St. Catherine and St. Lucy closest to the Virgin, each holding a martyr's palm and her implement of torture (Catherine a breaking wheel, and Lucy a dish with her eyes); St. Jerome, with a book symbolising his work on the Vulgate.

Stylistically, the lighting in the San Zaccaria piece has become soft and diffuse, contrasting with that in the San Giobbe. The San Zaccaria is considered perhaps the most beautiful and imposing of all Giovanni's altarpieces, and is dated 1505, the year following that of Giorgione's Madonna of Castelfranco.

Other late altarpieces with saints include that of the church of San Francesco della Vigna at Venice, 1507; that of La Corona at Vicenza, a Baptism of Christ in a landscape, 1510; and that of San Giovanni Crisostomo at Venice of 1513.

Of Giovanni's activity in the interval between the altarpieces of San Giobbe and San Zaccaria, there are a few minor works left, although the great majority of his output perished with the fire of the Doge's Palace in 1577. The last ten or twelve years of the master's life saw him besieged with more commissions than he could well complete. Already in the years 1501–1504, the marchioness Isabella Gonzaga of Mantua had experienced great difficulty in obtaining delivery from him of a painting of the Madonna and Saints (now lost) for which part payment had been made in advance.

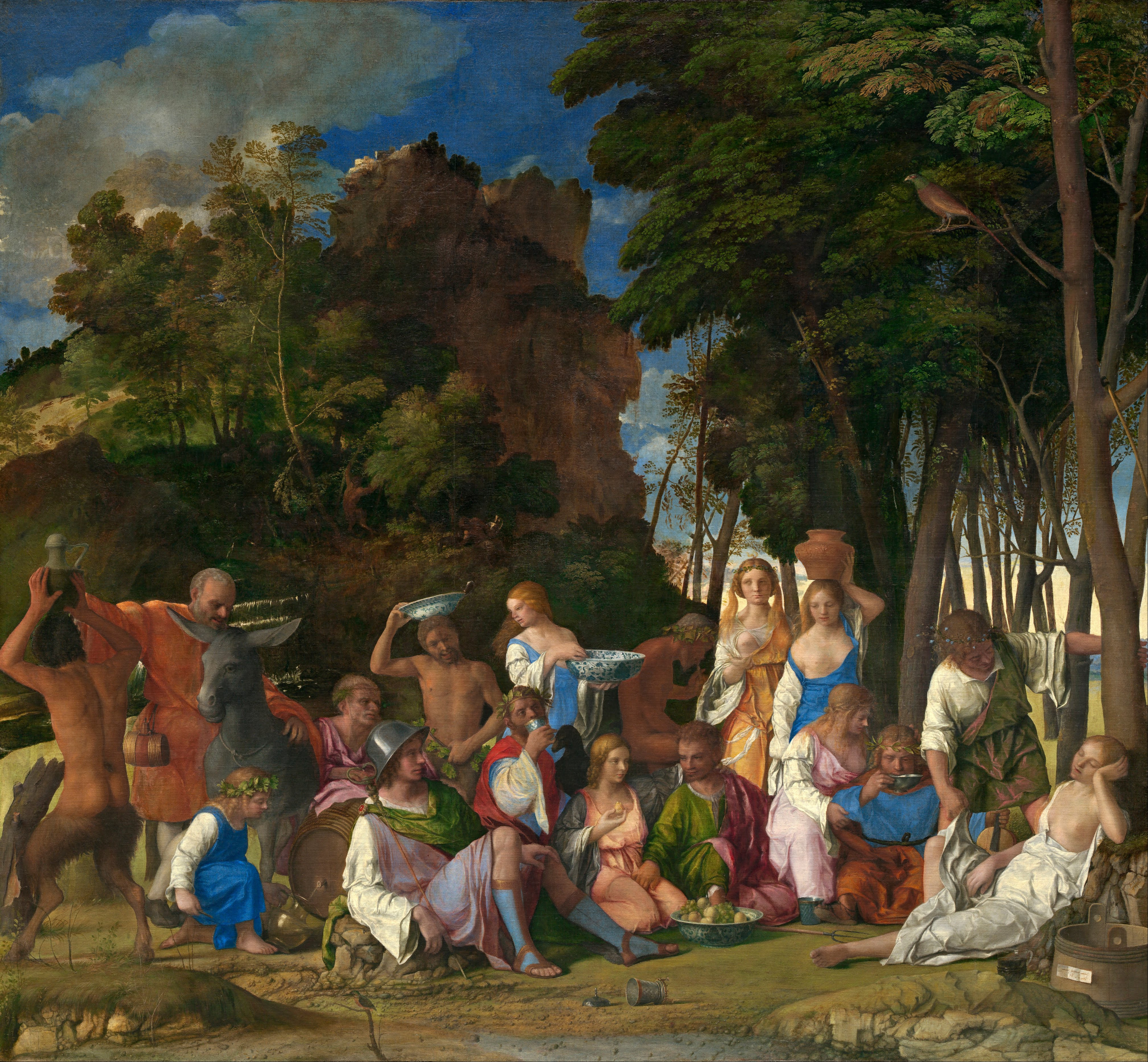
The Feast of the Gods, c. 1514 completed by his disciple, Titian, 1529; oil on canvas; National Gallery of Art, Washington, D.C.

In 1505, she endeavoured through Cardinal Bembo to obtain from him another painting, this time of a secular or mythological character. What the subject of this piece was, or whether it was delivered, we do not know.

Albrecht Dürer, visiting Venice for a second time in 1506, describes Giovanni Bellini as "very old, but still the best in painting", and as full of all courtesy and generosity toward foreign brethren of the brush.

In 1507, Bellini's brother Gentile died, and Giovanni completed the painting of the Preaching of St. Mark which his brother had left unfinished; a task on the fulfilment of which the bequest by the elder brother to the younger of Jacopo's sketch-book had been made conditional.

In 1513 Giovanni's position as sole master (since the death of Gentile and of Alvise Vivarini) in charge of the paintings in the Hall of the Great Council was considered for one of his former pupils. Young Titian desired a share of the same undertaking, to be paid for on the same terms. Titian's application was granted, then after a year rescinded, and then after another year or two granted again. In 1514, Giovanni undertook to paint The Feast of the Gods for the duke Alfonso I of Ferrara.

Bellini died on 29 November 1516 (a date is given by Marin Sanudo on his diary). He was interred in the Basilica di San Giovanni e Paolo, a traditional burial place of the doges.

== Assessment ==
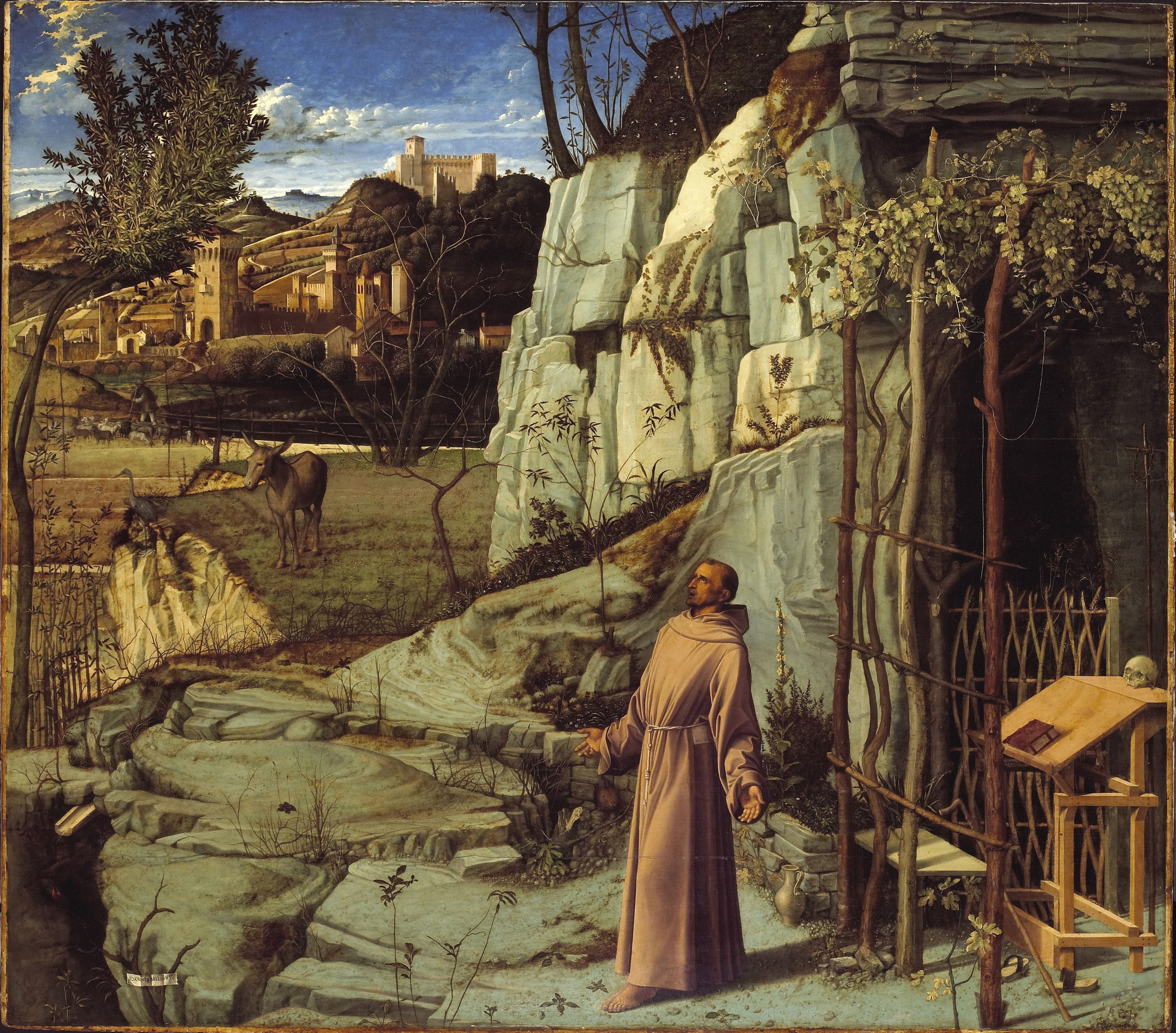
St. Francis in Ecstasy, 1480; oil and tempera on panel; Frick Collection, New York

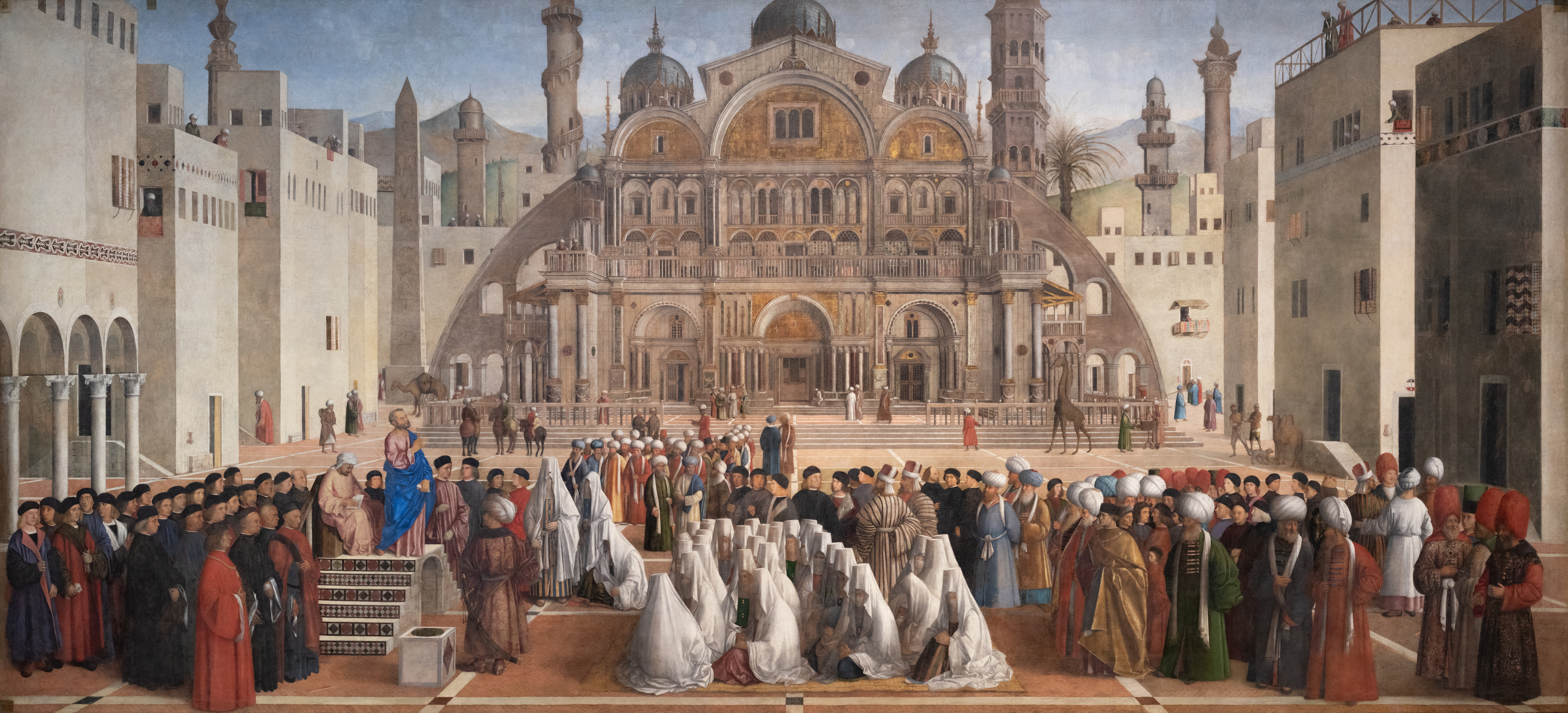
Gentile and Giovanni Bellini, St. Mark Preaching in Alexandria, 1504–7; oil on canvas; Pinacoteca di Brera, Milan

In both an artistic and worldly sense, the career of Bellini was overall prosperous. His career began with Quattrocento but matured into the progressive post-Giorgione Renaissance style. He lived to see his own school exceed that of his rivals, the Vivarini of Murano. His work captured the devotional gravity and much of Venice's splendor. He influenced a host of pupils, including Giorgione and Titian, who equalled or even surpassed him. Bellini outlived Giorgione by five years; Titian challenged him, claiming an equal place beside him. Other pupils of the Bellini studio included Girolamo Galizzi da Santacroce, Vittore Belliniano, Rocco Marconi, Andrea Previtali and possibly Bernardino Licinio.

Bellini was essential to the development of the Italian Renaissance for his incorporation of aesthetics from Northern Europe. Significantly influenced by Antonello da Messina and contemporary trends such as oil painting, Bellini introduced the pala, or single-panel altarpieces, to Venetian society with his work Coronation of the Virgin. Certain details in this piece, such as breaks in the modelling of figures and shadows, imply that Bellini was still working to master the use of oil. This painting also differs from previous coronation scenes as it appears as a "window" to a natural scene, and excludes the typical accompanying paradise hosts. The simple scenery allows viewers to relate with more ease to the scene itself than before, reflecting Alberti's humanist and inventio concepts. He also used the disguised symbolism integral to the Northern Renaissance. Bellini was able to master the Antonello style of oil painting and surface texture and to use this skill to create a refined and distinctly Venetian approach to painting. He blends this new technique with Venetian and Byzantine traditions (previously influencing art in the city) of iconography and colour to create a spiritual theme not found in Antonello's pieces. The realism of oil painting coupled with the religious traditions of Venice were unique elements to Bellini's style, which set him apart as one of the most innovative painters in the Venetian Renaissance. As demonstrated in such works as St. Francis in Ecstasy (c. 1480) and the San Giobbe Altarpiece (c. 1478), Bellini makes use of religious symbolism through natural elements, such as grapevines and rocks. Yet his most important contribution to art lies in his experimentation with the use of colour and atmosphere in oil painting.

In 1822, German artist and composer Therese Emilie Henriette Winkel copied Bellini's work Christ Blessing for an altarpiece for the Brockwitz church in Dresden, Germany, which is still preserved today.

Spanish Museums own a scarce, but high-quality, presence of his works. The Prado Museum owns a Virgin and child between two Saints, with the collaboration of the workshop. The Thyssen-Bornemisza Museum preserves a Nunc Dimittis, and The Real Academia de Bellas Artes de San Fernando holds a Saviour.

== Gallery ==
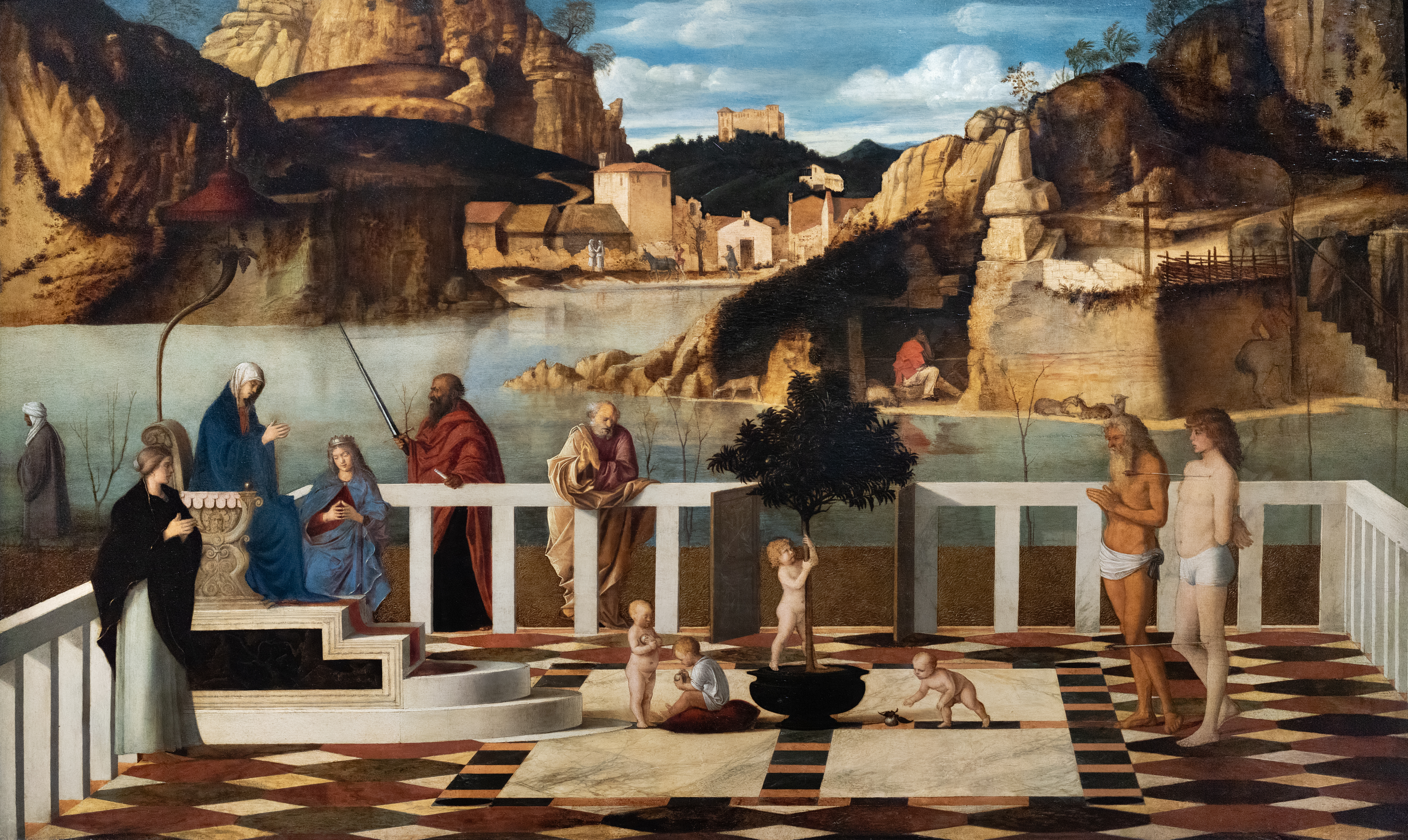
Holy Allegory

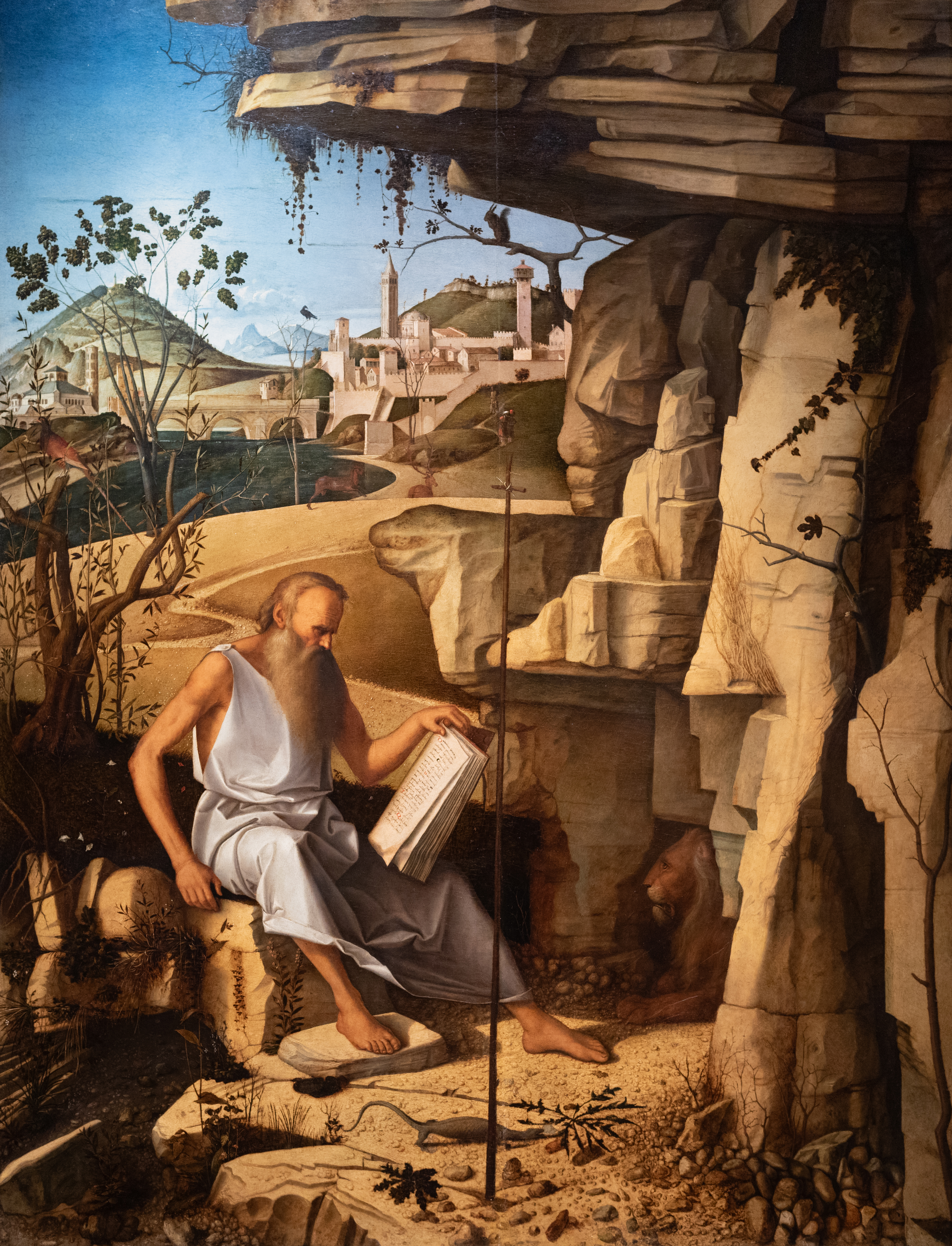
Saint Jerome Reading in the Desert

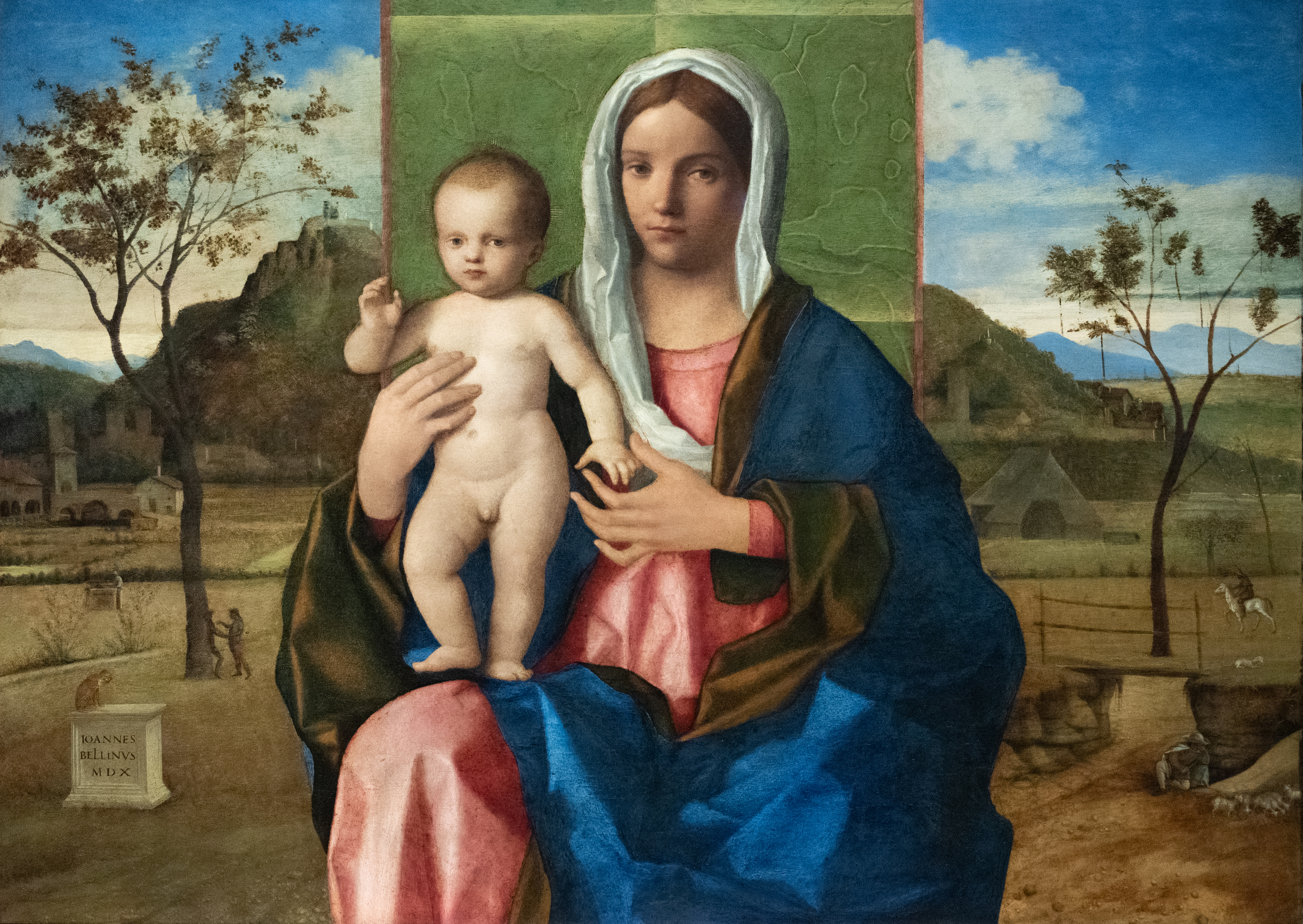
Madonna and Child

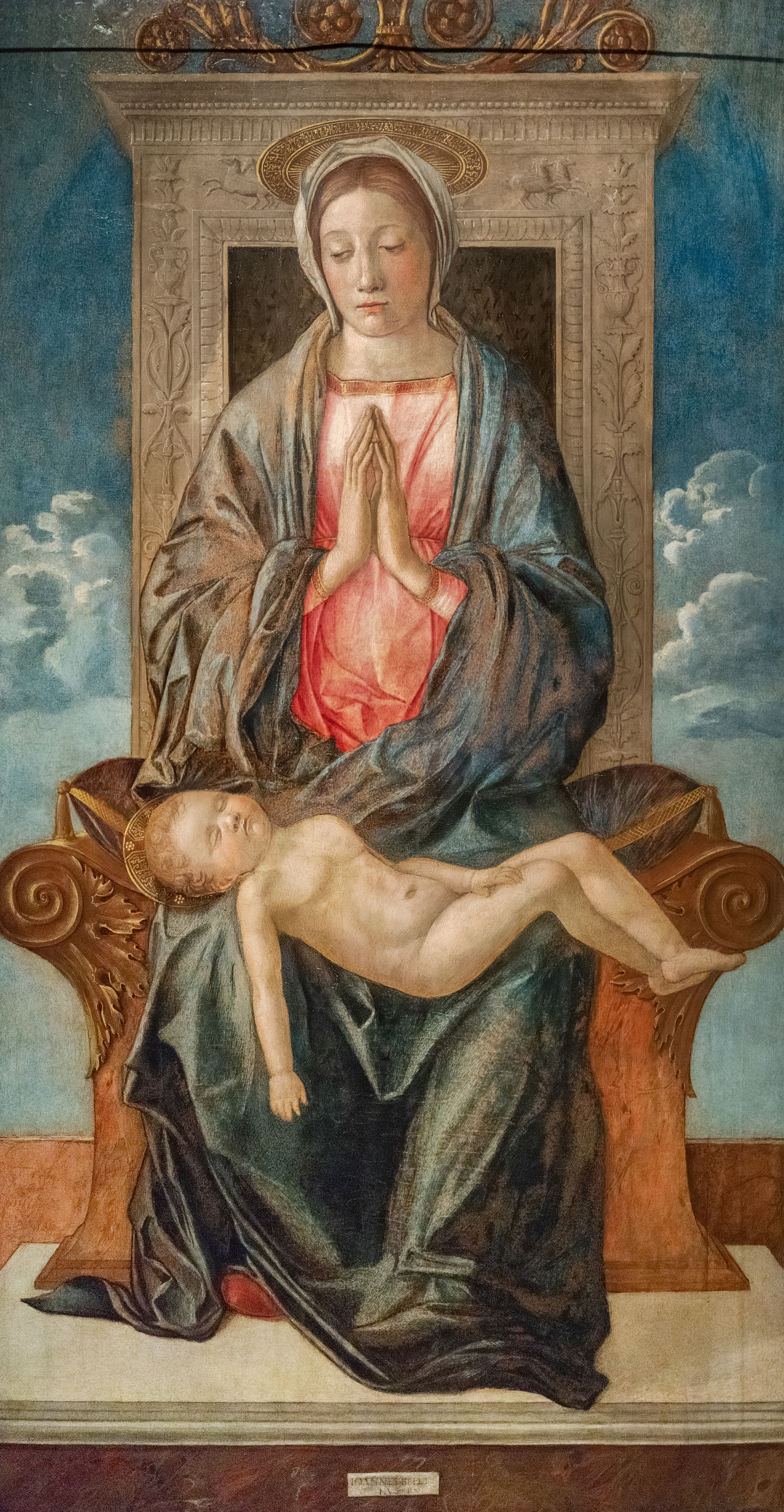
Enthroned Madonna Adoring the Sleeping Christ Child

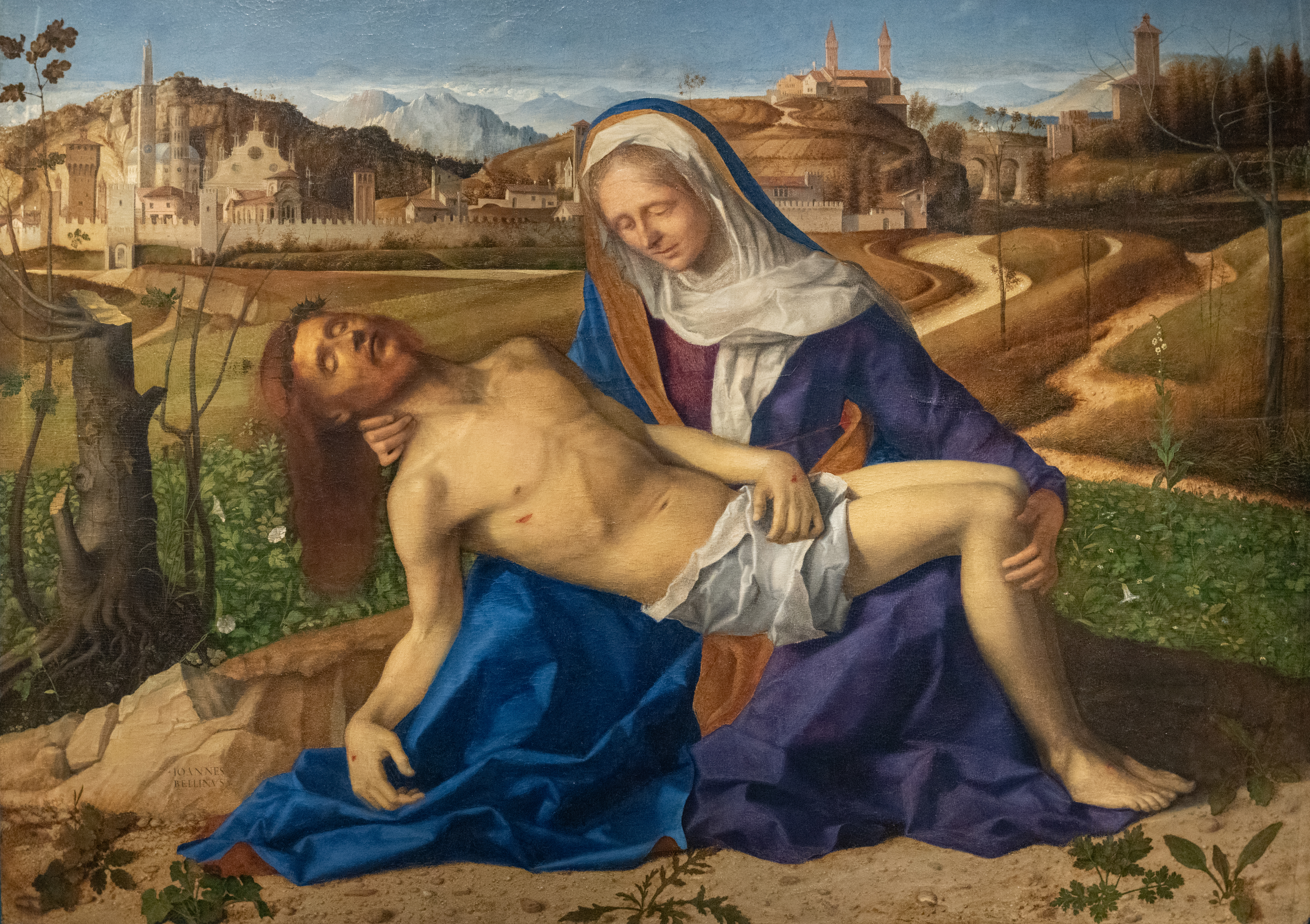
Pietà Martinengo

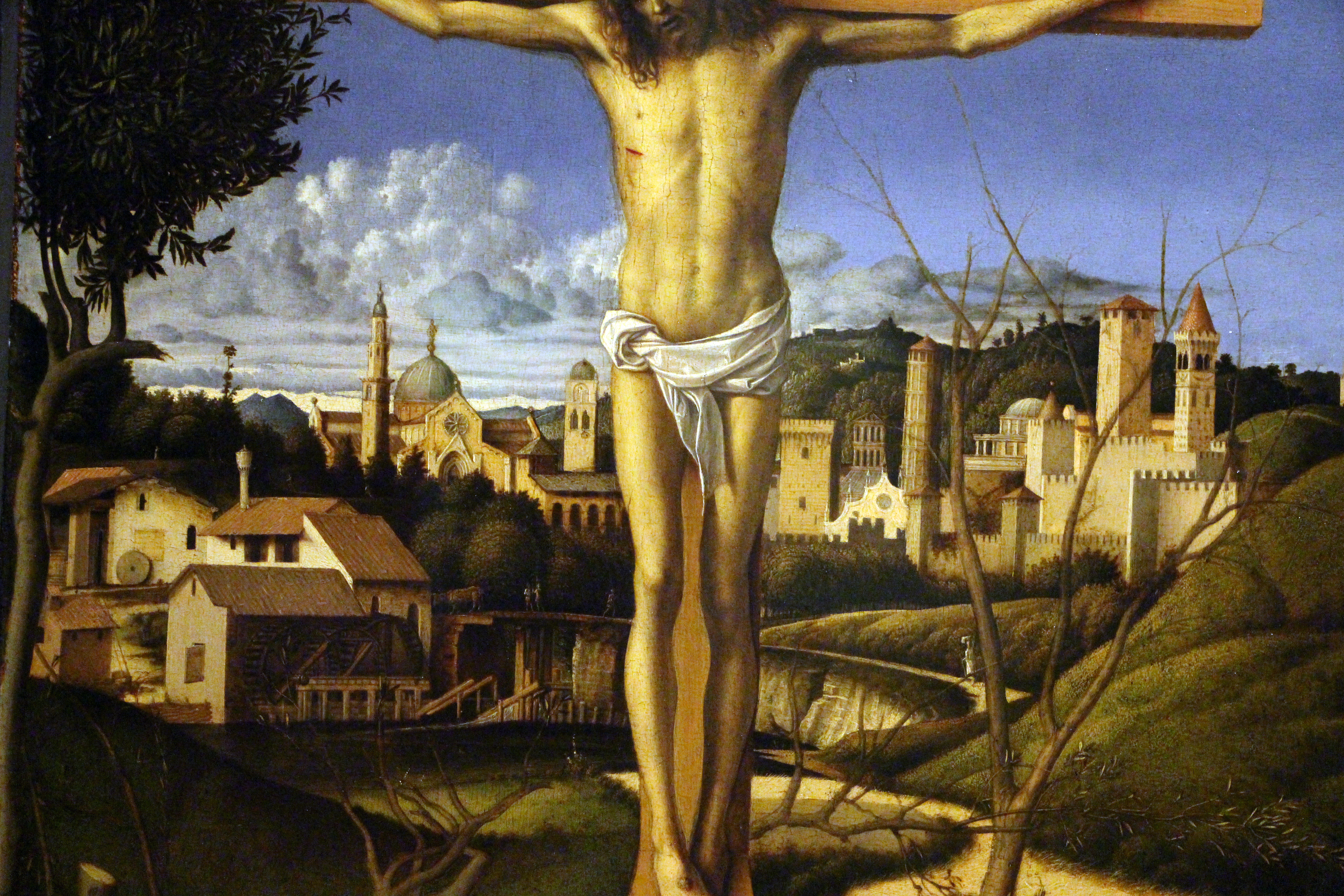
Crucifixion - detail with the Cathedral of Ancona
