= Saint Jerome in Penitence (Lotto, Allentown) =

1515 painting by Lorenzo Lotto

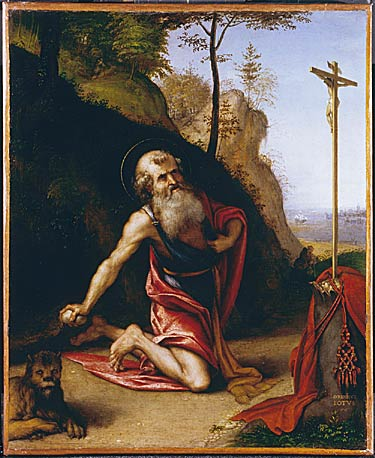
Saint Jerome in Penitence, a 1515 portrait by Lorenzo Lotto on display at the Allentown Art Museum

Saint Jerome in Penitence is a 1515 oil-on-canvas painting by Italian Renaissance artist Lorenzo Lotto, now in the Allentown Art Museum in Allentown, Pennsylvania. It is signed on the rock next to the saint.

It was produced early in the painter's time in Bergamo. It was commissioned by Domenico Tasso, count and apostolic knight, for his new house on Via Pignolo in the city. Lotto had met Tasso in Rome and it may have been Tasso who drew him to Bergamo. Carlo Ridolfi mentions it among the paintings "in Domenego Dal Cornello's house" in 1648. In the 18th century, Tasso's descendants sold it to help with their financial difficulties. It was later acquired by Samuel H. Kress, who donated it to the Allentown Art Museum in 1960.

== See also ==
- Saint Jerome in Penitence (Lotto, Paris), c.1506, Louvre, Paris
- Saint Jerome in Penitence (Lotto, Rome) (c.1509). Museo nazionale di Castel Sant'Angelo, Rome
