= Saint Augustine in His Study (Botticelli, Uffizi) =

Painting by Sandro Botticelli

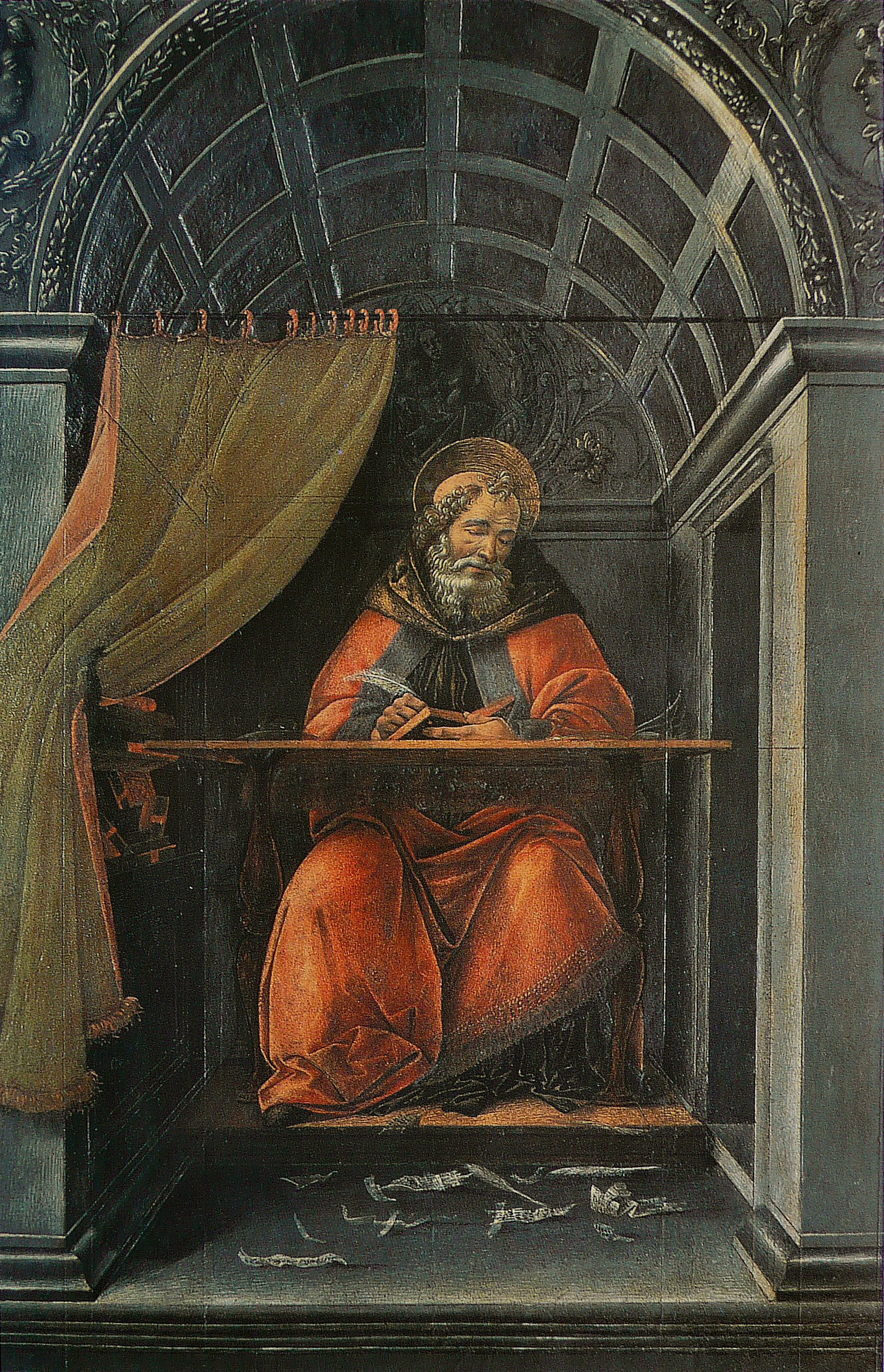
- Artist: Sandro Botticelli
- Year: 1490–1494
- Medium: Tempera on panel
- Dimensions: 41 cm × 27 cm (16 in × 11 in)
- Location: Uffizi, Florence

Saint Augustine in His Study is a tempera on panel painting by the Italian Renaissance master Sandro Botticelli, finished around 1490–1494. It is housed in the Uffizi, in Florence.

This work was probably executed for an Augustinian hermit of Santo Spirito, as shown by the fact the saint wears both episcopal and hermit garments.

As many of Botticelli's late works, it is inspired by the preaching of Savonarola.

== See also ==
- Saint Augustine in His Study (Botticelli, Ognissanti)
- List of works by Sandro Botticelli
