= Saint Jerome in Penitence (Lotto, Sibiu) =

c. 1513 painting by Lorenzo Lotto

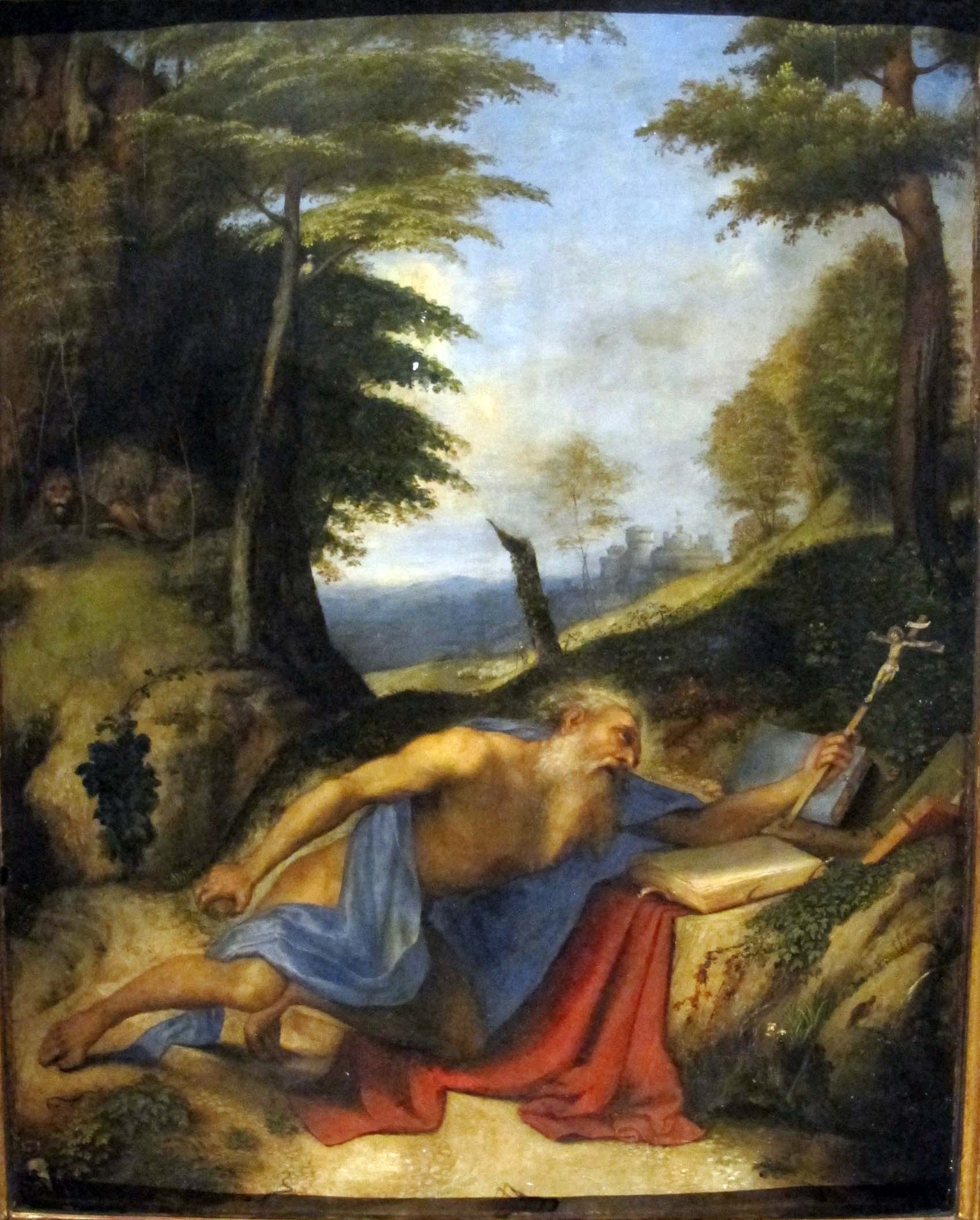
Saint Jerome in Penitence (c. 1513–1514) by Lorenzo Lotto

Saint Jerome in Penitence is an oil-on-panel painting by the Italian Renaissance artist Lorenzo Lotto, now in the Brukenthal Museum in Sibiu, Romania. It is signed at the bottom left "LAUREN/LOTUS", and is dated to c. 1513–1514, early in his time in Bergamo, when he was still clearly influenced by Raphael and other painters active in Rome. It entered the collection of baron Samuel von Brukenthal and remained with his heirs before being confiscated in 1948 and placed in the National Museum of Art of Romania in Bucharest, where it remained until moving to its present location in 2006.
