= Saint Jerome in the Desert (Bellini, Birmingham) =

Painting by Giovanni Bellini

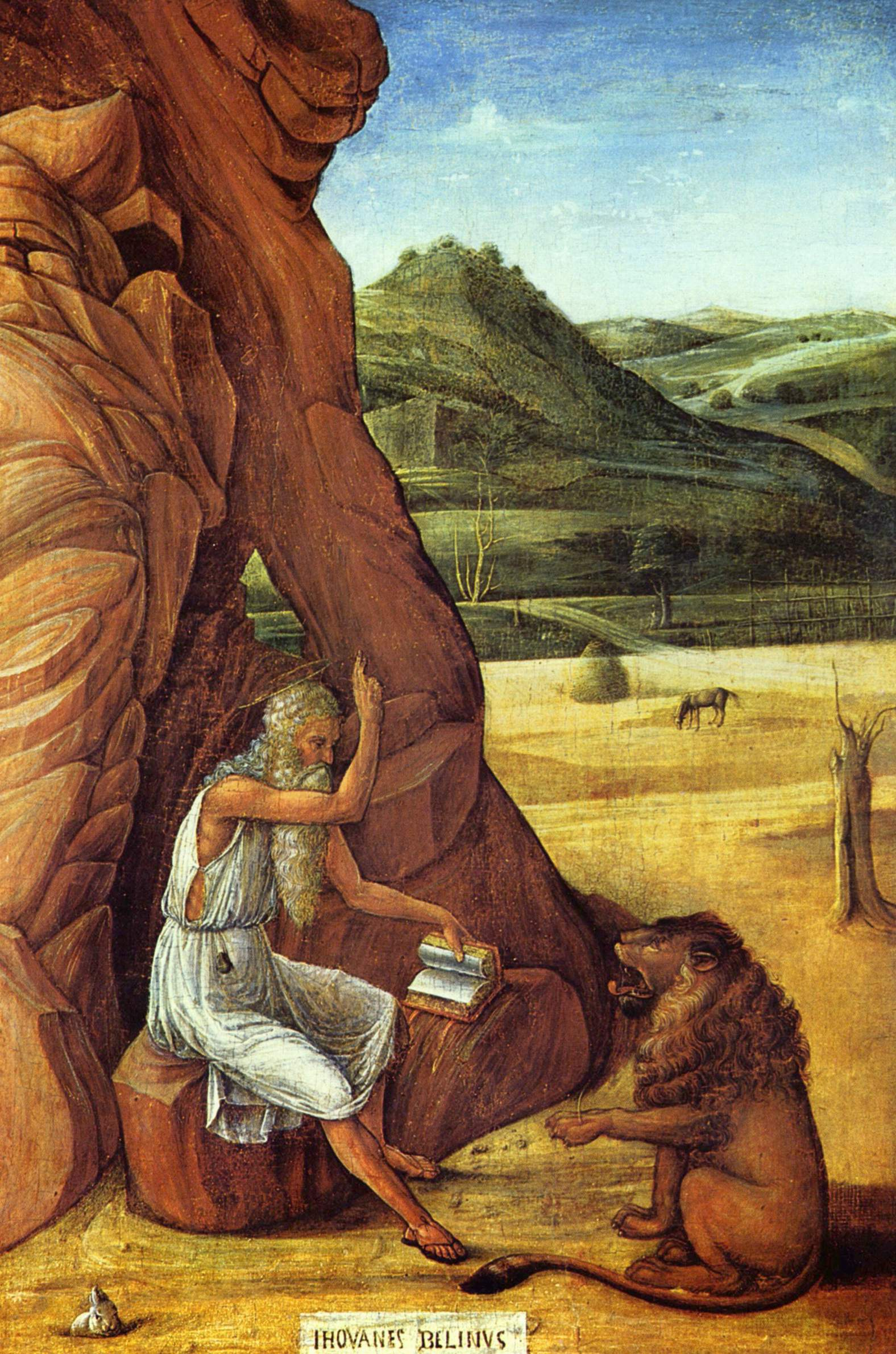
- Artist: Giovanni Bellini
- Year: c. 1450
- Medium: Egg tempera on wood
- Dimensions: 44 cm × 39 cm (17 in × 15 in)
- Location: Barber Institute of Fine Arts, Birmingham

Saint Jerome in the Desert is a painting in egg tempera on wood by the Italian Renaissance artist Giovanni Bellini, dating from around 1450. It is housed in the Barber Institute of Fine Arts in Birmingham, England.

Universally recognised as Bellini's earliest surviving work, created when he was about 16, the painting depicts Saint Jerome seated semi-naked on a rock in front of his cave in the Syrian Desert. He holds a book in his left hand, referencing his life as a hermit and his role in producing the Vulgate Bible. His faithful lion is depicted in front of him, with the saint appearing to bless the animal. The lion retains the famous thorn on his paw, which according to the legend was removed by Jerome.
