= Saint Augustine in His Study (Botticelli, Ognissanti) =

Fresco painting by Sandro Botticelli

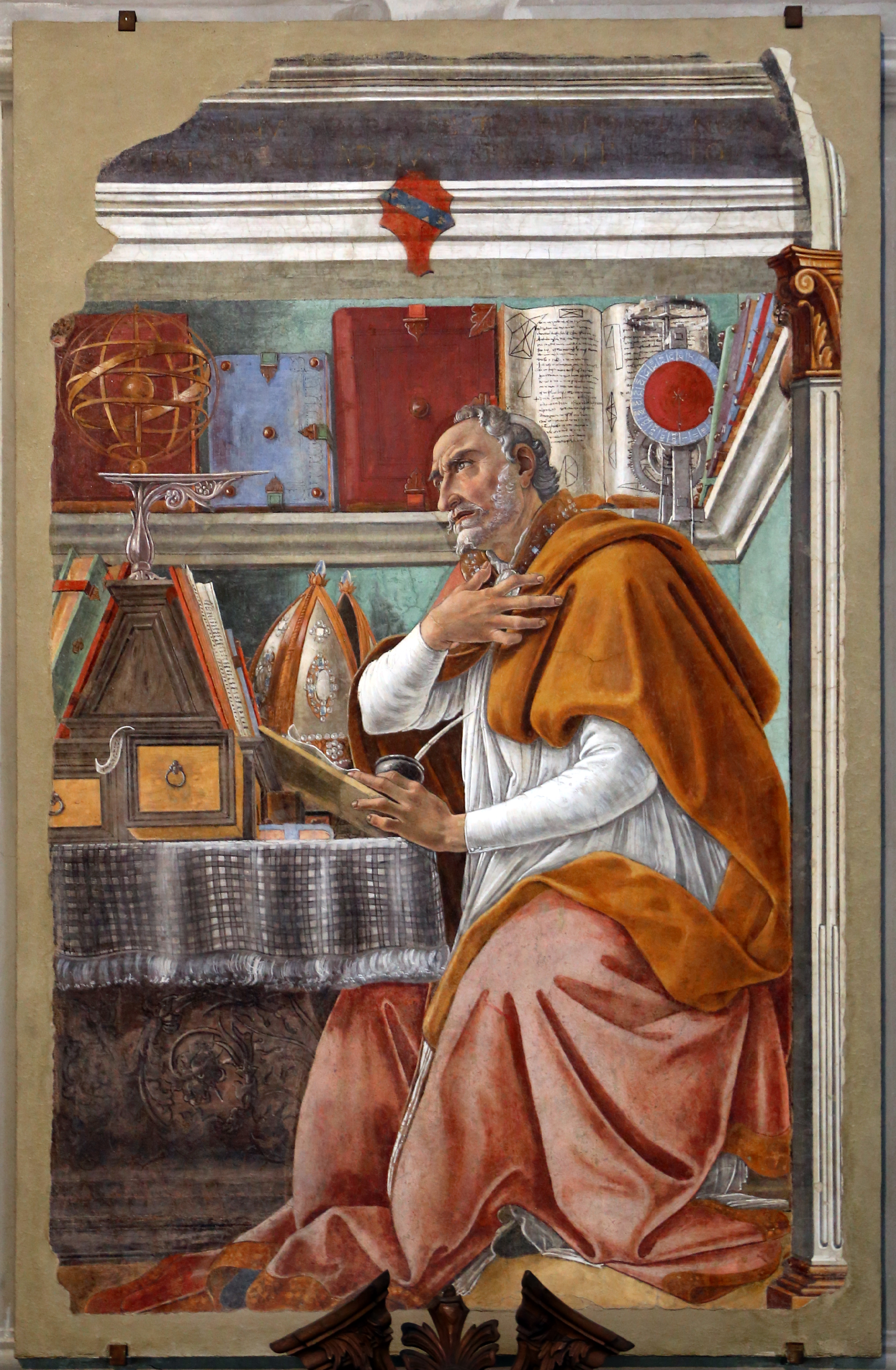
- Artist: Sandro Botticelli
- Year: 1480
- Type: Fresco
- Dimensions: 152 cm × 112 cm (60 in × 44 in)
- Location: Church of Ognissanti; Florence

Saint Augustine in His Study is a fresco painting of Augustine of Hippo executed in 1480 by the Italian Renaissance master Sandro Botticelli. It is in the church of Ognissanti in Florence.

Botticelli was born in a house on the same street as the church, still called Via Borgo Ognissanti. He was to live within a minute or two's walk of this all his life, and to be buried in the church.

== History ==
In 1464 Botticelli's father bought a house in Via Nuova nearby (modern Via della Porcellana), which Sandro took over in 1470 and lived in for the rest of his life. Here the notable family on the street was the Vespucci, including Amerigo Vespucci, born in 1454, after whom the Americas were named. The Vespucci were close Medici allies and would become regular patrons of Botticelli.

The work was commissioned by the Vespucci family, probably Amerigo's father Nastaglio, a notary, and his brother Giorgio Antonio, both neighbours of Botticelli. Someone else, probably the order running the church, commissioned Domenico Ghirlandaio to do a facing Saint Jerome; both saints were shown writing in their studies, which are crowded with objects. As in other cases, such direct competition "was always an inducement to Botticelli to put out all his powers", and the fresco, now his earliest to survive, is regarded as his finest by Ronald Lightbown. Both depicted two Doctors of the Church in their studies, with a number of objects which mark them as scholars and precursors of Renaissance Humanism. There is known to have been a small painting of Jerome in his study said to have been by Jan van Eyck in the Medici collection, which is now lost. This may have influenced both frescos.

They decorated the screen of the unusually located choir, which was demolished in 1564–1566 when they were detached and moved to the nave. They are now in the refectory, moved there after sustaining slight damage in the 1966 flood of the Arno. In the first move, part of the frame with its inscriptions went lost, and all of Jerome's.

== Description ==
It portrays Augustine of Hippo in meditation inside his study. The precise subject is a legend, probably first found in the 13th century, of a vision Augustine had as he began to write a letter to Jerome in his study at Hippo in 420. The time is shown on the clock by his head as the end of the twenty-fourth hour, counting from the previous sunset. This is the hour of Compline, specified in the legend. A light and sweet odour came into his study and a voice told him that "he might as soon enclose the ocean in a small vessel, as soon clasp the whole earth in his fist, as soon halt the movement of the heavens as describe the beatitude of the saints without having experienced it", as the speaker was now doing. When Augustine asked who he was, he replied he was Jerome. Augustine later heard that Jerome had died in Jerusalem at exactly that hour.

The coat of arms visible in the upper part is that of the Vespucci family; Jerome has no equivalent arms.

The lines in the book over the saint's head are mostly meaningless, apart from a line which reads: Dov'è Frate Martino? È scappato. E dov'è andato? È fuor dalla Porta al Prato ("Where is Brother Martino? He went out. And where did he go? He is outside Porta al Prato"), probably referring to the escapades of one of the Uumiliati, the order who ran the church. Lightbown suggests that this shows Botticelli thought "the example of Jerome and Augustine likely to be thrown away on the Umiliati as he knew them".

== See also ==
- List of works by Sandro Botticelli
- Saint Augustine in His Study (Botticelli, Uffizi), a later version of the same subject
- St. Augustine in His Study (Carpaccio)
