= Saint Jerome in His Study (Ghirlandaio) =

Fresco by Domenico Ghirlandaio

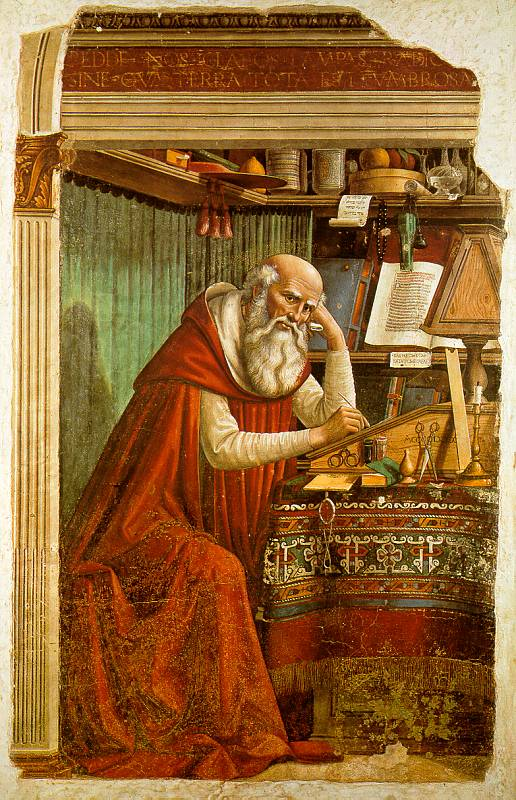
- Artist: Domenico Ghirlandaio
- Year: 1480
- Type: Fresco
- Dimensions: 184 cm × 119 cm (72 in × 47 in)
- Location: Church of Ognissanti; Florence

Saint Jerome in His Study is a fresco by the Italian Renaissance painter Domenico Ghirlandaio, executed in 1480 and located in the church of Ognissanti, Florence.

The work was commissioned by the Vespucci family together with a Saint Augustine in His Study by Sandro Botticelli (1480). Both depicted two Doctors of the Church in their studies, with a number of objects which should mark their role as precursors of humanism. They decorated the area next to the choir, which was demolished in the 18th century. In that occasion the two frescoes were removed and placed in the nave. Part of the annexed frame and the inscriptions were lost.

== Description ==
While Botticelli adopted a more expressive composition in his Saint Augustine (inspired by Andrea del Castagno's works), Ghirlandaio created a more serene and conventional figure, concentrating instead on the still life of the objects exposed on the writing desk and the shelves behind Jerome. In this, he was perhaps inspired by northern European models, such as Jan van Eyck's Saint Jerome in His Study which was in the collections of Lorenzo de' Medici.

Jerome is portrayed with his head resting on one hand, while writing with the other. This was the same posture chosen by Jan van Eyck. The open books and the cartouches, with Greek and Hebrew letters, correspond to his activity as translator of the Bible. On the writing desk is the date (MCCCCLXXX), as well as a sealed letter, glasses, two inkwells (with drops of ink near them), scissors and a candle holder. The desk is covered by an oriental carpet, a luxurious object often depicted by Ghirlandaio, and perhaps also inspired by Netherlandish painters. The objects on the shelves include a cardinal hat, two pharmacist vases, a cylindrical case, a necklace, a purse, some fruit, two transparent glass bottles and an hourglass.

The light comes from the upper right corner, producing a well defined shadow of the saint on the drapery behind him; but also from the foreground, illuminating the objects on the desk.

== Sources ==
- Micheletti, Emma (2004). "Ghirlandaio". Pittori del Rinascimento. Florence: Scala.
