= Saint Jerome in Penitence (Lotto, Rome) =

c. 1509 painting by Lorenzo Lotto

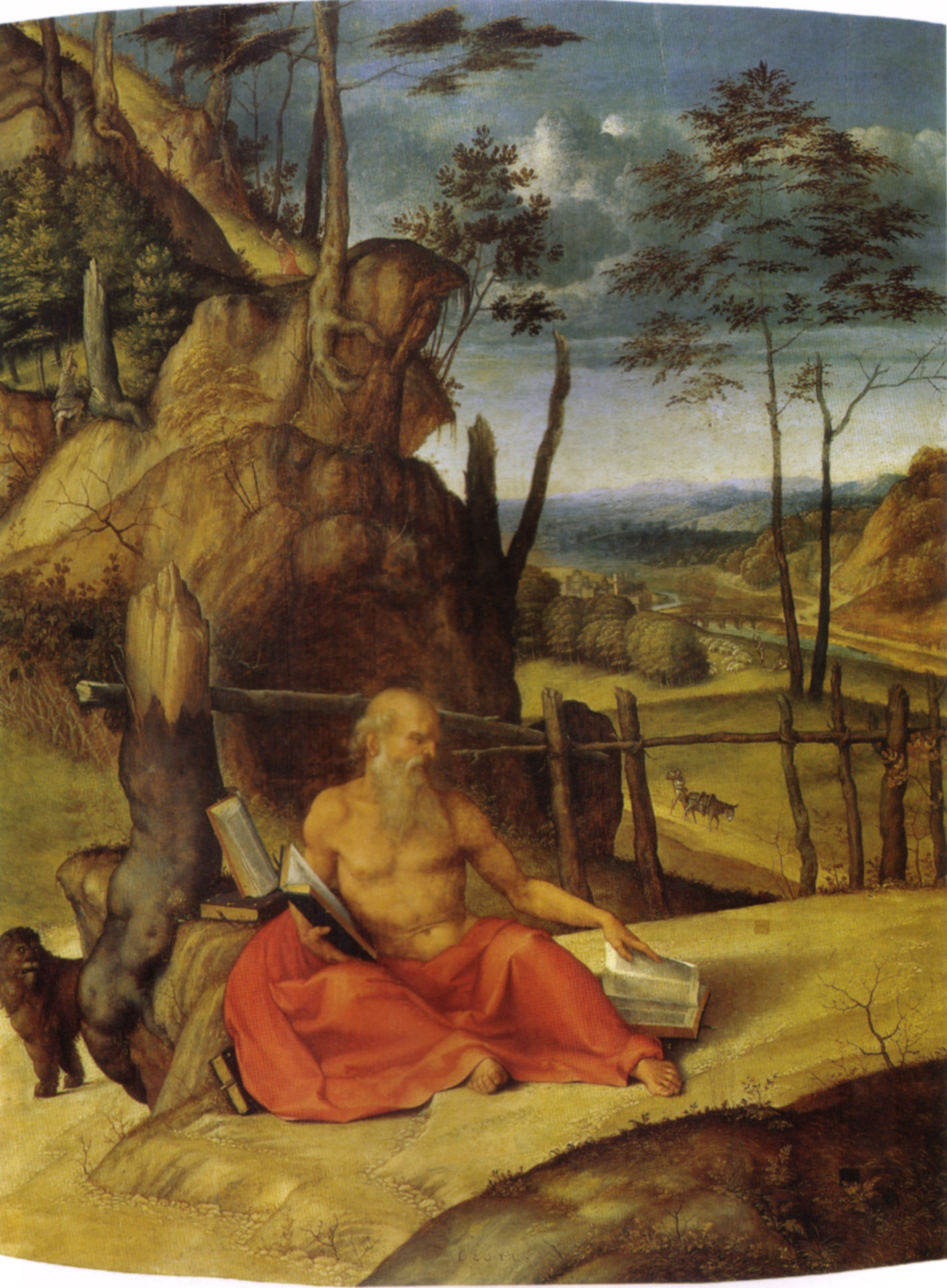
Saint Jerome in Penitence (c. 1509) by Lorenzo Lotto

Saint Jerome in Penitence is a signed oil-on-panel painting by Italian Renaissance artist Lorenzo Lotto, created c. 1509. It is now in the Museo nazionale di Castel Sant'Angelo in Rome, to which it was donated by a private collector in 1916.

Undated by the artist, it was probably produced during the painter's stay in Rome and shows the influence of other artists then active at Pope Julius II's court, most notably Raphael. Its commissioner is unknown, though some hold it to be a variation on another Saint Jerome in Penitence (1506, Paris) by Lotto, which has the saint seated in the landscape in a similar pose and in a similar red cardinal's robe.

== See also ==
- Saint Jerome in Penitence (Lotto, Paris) (c.1506), Louvre, Paris
- Saint Jerome in Penitence (Lotto, Allentown) (1515), Allentown Art Museum, Pennsylvania
