= Saint Jerome in Penitence (Lotto, Paris) =

c. 1506 painting by Lorenzo Lotto

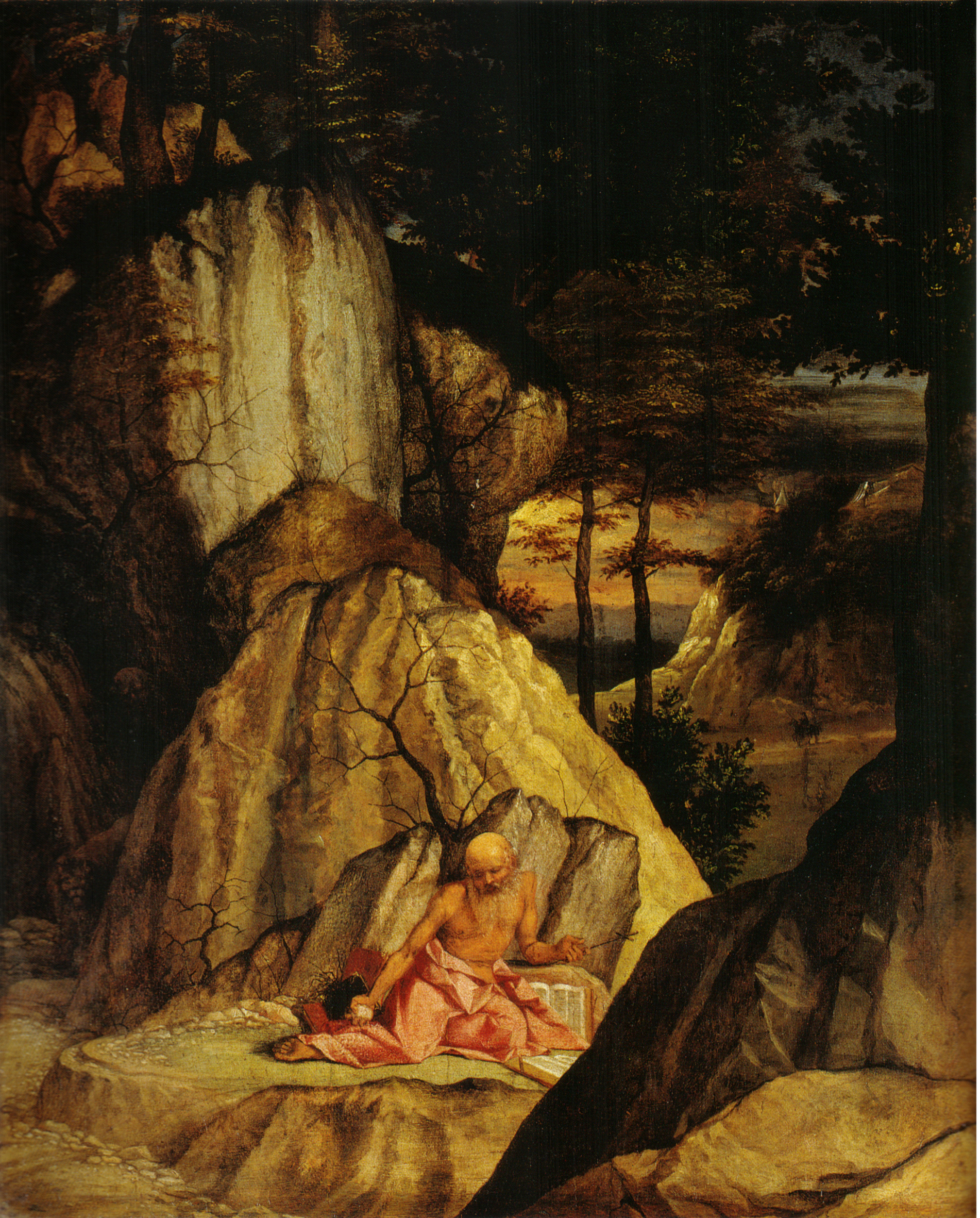
- Artist: Lorenzo Lotto
- Year: c. 1506
- Medium: Oil on wood
- Dimensions: .48 m × .585 m (19 in × 23.0 in)
- Location: Louvre, Paris
- Accession: MI 164
- Website: collections.louvre.fr/en/ark:/53355/cl010064971

Saint Jerome in Penitence is an oil-on-panel painting by Italian Renaissance artist Lorenzo Lotto. Its signature ("Lotus") is fully legible, but the final number of the date is illegible, though it is usually dated to around 1506. It is now in the Louvre.

It is traditionally ascribed to the painter's period in Treviso, possibly commissioned by bishop Bernardo de' Rossi for private devotion. A 1510 inventory shows that de' Rossi owned a painting of Saint Jerome, but it is not known for certain that it was the work now in Paris. Some theories hold it to have been a cover for a portrait. It was recorded in Cardinal Fesch's collection in 1814.

== See also ==
- Saint Jerome in Penitence (Lotto, Rome) (c.1509). Museo nazionale di Castel Sant'Angelo, Rome
- Saint Jerome in Penitence (Lotto, Allentown) (1515), Allentown Art Museum, Pennsylvania
