= Saint Jerome in His Study (after van Eyck) =

Painting from the workshop of Jan van Eyck

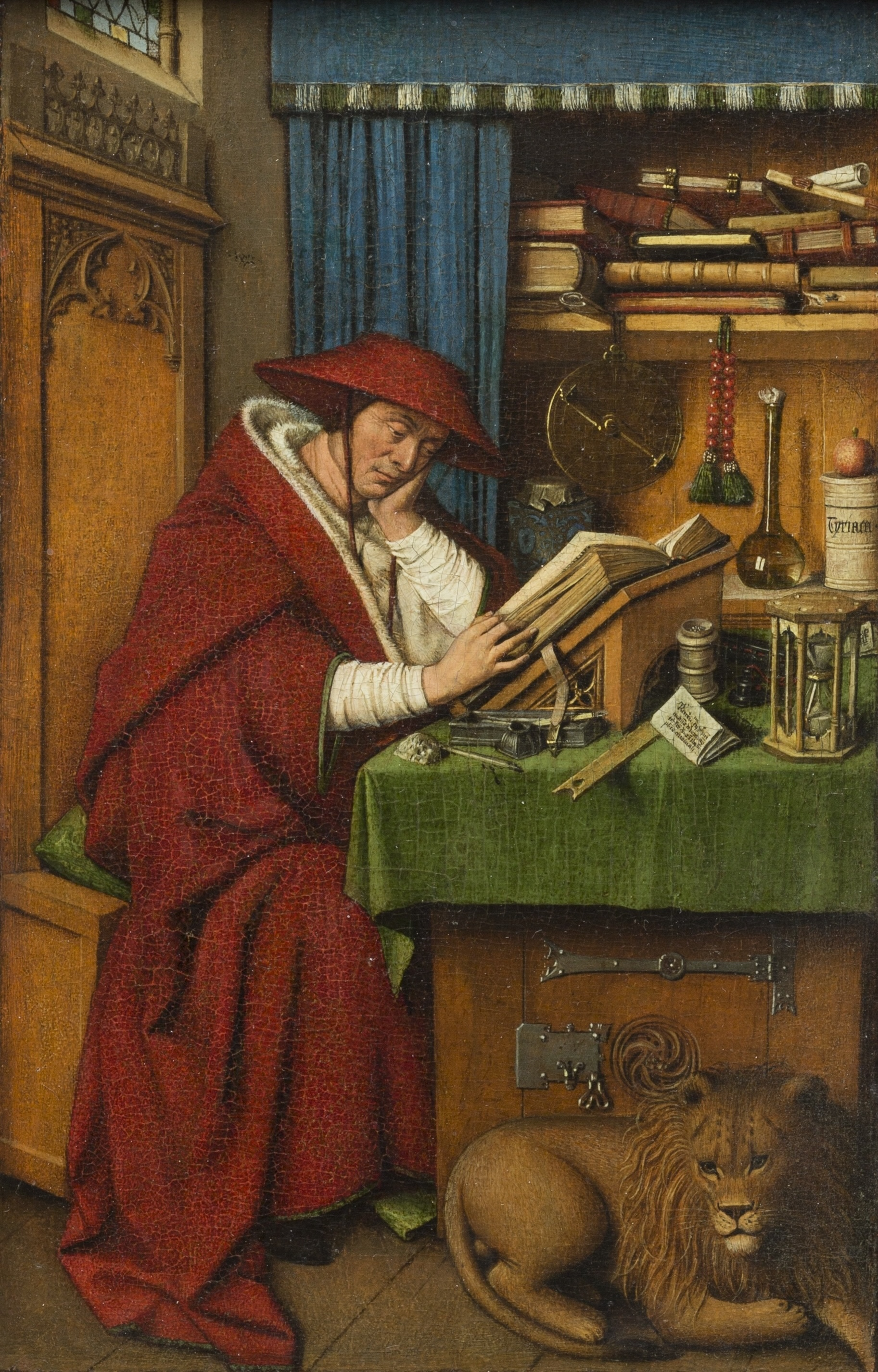
- Artist: Jan van Eyck
- Year: 1442
- Medium: Oil on panel
- Dimensions: 20.6 cm × 13.3 cm (8.1 in × 5.2 in)
- Location: Detroit Institute of Arts, Detroit
- Accession: 25.4
- Website: https://dia.org/collection/saint-jerome-his-study-44739

Saint Jerome in His Study is an oil painting on panel no larger than an oversized postcard attributed to the workshop of the early Netherlandish painter Jan van Eyck and is currently in the collection of the Detroit Institute of Arts. Purchased in 1925 by museum director Dr. W.R. Valentiner, the small Flemish painting at that time was attributed to Petrus Christus. The painting depicts St. Jerome, the 4th-century translator of the Bible, reading in his study, wearing a cardinal's dress and hat. He is surrounded by objects exemplyfying late medieval intellectual life and accompanied by the pet lion that is his common attribute.

== History ==
Since the date on the painting is subsequent to Jan van Eyck's death (June 1441), it is likely that the work, left unfinished, had been completed by members of his workshop, or his brother Lambert. It was started in 1436 though.

A work with a similar subject is mentioned in the inventories of Palazzo Medici in Florence, which had been drawn up after the death of Lorenzo de' Medici in 1492. Even if not the work now at Detroit, this could have been the latter's prototype, since the painting is not unanimously attributed to van Eyck. There are indeed striking similarities between this work and Domenico Ghirlandaio's Saint Jerome in His Study (1480).

== Description ==
The painting depicts Saint Jerome in the traditional representation inside his study. He wears a cardinal's dress and hat, and is reading a book, in a small study clogged with numerous objects showing his erudition and interests. Below is a lion, recalling the saint's legend in which he had extracted a thorn from the paw of the animal, who had later remained loyal to him. The light enters from a window behind the writing desk and from the foreground, in order to illuminate any detail of the scene. Objects on the desk and the shelves include an hourglass, a pounce pot, a ruler, an astrolabe, numerous books and writing instruments, all suitable for the idealized Renaissance man.

== See also ==
- Saint Jerome in His Study (Ghirlandaio)
- St Jerome in His Study (Antonello da Messina)

== Sources ==
- Zuffi, Stefano (2004). Il Quattrocento. Milan: Electa.
