= Wallace (surname) =

Wallace is a Scottish surname stemmed from the Anglo-Norman French Waleis "Welshman". It is a northern variant form of Gualeis "Welshman" (Wace, Brut, éd. I. Arnold, 13927); adjectiv gualeis "Welsh" (Id., ibid., 14745); same as walois "the oil language" (J. Bretel, Tournoi de Chauvency, éd. M. Delbouille, 63).

It originates from Old Low Franconian *Walhisk meaning "foreigner", "Celt", "Roman" which is a cognate of Old English wǣlisċ meaning "foreigner" or "Welshman" (see also Wallach and Walhaz). The original surname may have denoted someone from the former Kingdom of Strathclyde who spoke Cumbric, a close relative of the Welsh language, or possibly an incomer from Wales, or the Welsh Marches. The Kingdom of Strathclyde was originally a part of the Hen Ogledd, its people speaking a Brittonic language distinct from Scottish Gaelic and the Scots language derived from Lothian.

Variations of the name include Welsh, Walla, Wallais, Wallice, Wallang, Wallass, Wallayis, Wallays, Walleis, Wallensis, Walles, Valance, Valensis, Valeyns, Vallace, Vallance, and Valles.

== Notable people ==
=== Academia ===
- Alexander Doniphan Wallace (1905–1985) American mathematician
- Alfred Russel Wallace (1823–1913), British naturalist and biologist
- Andrew H. Wallace (1926–2008), Scottish-American mathematician
- Bruce Wallace (geneticist)
- Carden Wallace, Australian marine biologist
- Carolynn Reid-Wallace (born 1942), American academic administrator
- Catherine C. "Cath" Wallace (born 1952), New Zealand environmentalist and academic
- Chris Wallace (computer scientist) (1933–2004), Australian computer scientist and physicist, developer of Minimum Message Length
- David R. Wallace (1942–2012), American software engineer and inventor
- David Rains Wallace (born 1945), author on conservation and natural history
- David Wallace (physicist) (born 1945), British physicist and Master of Churchill College, Cambridge
- David Wallace (medievalist), British scholar of medieval literature
- Dorothy Wallace, American mathematician
- Douglas C. Wallace (born 1946), American geneticist and evolutionary biologist
- Frank R. Wallace (1932–2006), author and philosopher
- Ian Wallace (ornithologist) (1933–2021), British ornithologist and natural history author
- John Higgins Wallace Jr. (1906–1989), American chemist
- John L. Wallace (born 1956), Canadian medical scientist
- J. M. Wallace-Hadrill (1916–1985), British academic and historian
- John Michael Wallace (born 1940), American atmospheric scientist
- Mike Wallace (historian) (1942–2026), American historian
- Perry Wallace (1948–2017), American law professor and first African American athlete to play a complete college career in the Southeastern Conference
- Raymond L. Wallace (1918–2002), American Bigfoot researcher
- Richard Wallace (scientist), artificial intelligence researcher
- Robert Charles Wallace (1881–1955), Scottish-born Canadian geologist, educator, and administrator
- William Wallace (philosopher) (1844–1897), Scottish philosopher
- William Wallace (mathematician) (1768–1843), Scottish mathematician
- William Wallace, Baron Wallace of Saltaire (born 1941), British academic, writer and politician
- William A. Wallace (organizational theorist) (born 1935), Professor at Rensselaer Polytechnic Institute
- William E. Wallace (1917–2004), physical chemist

=== Armed forces ===
- Christopher Wallace (British Army officer) (1943–2016), retired British Army general and trustee of the Imperial War Museum
- Colin Wallace (born 1943), British soldier and psychological warfare operative
- George W. Wallace (1872–1946), American soldier
- Hazel Wallace (1897–1976), Canadian World War I flying ace
- Herman C. Wallace (1924–1945), American soldier
- Jacob Wallace (1810–1847), American pro-Mexican guerrilla leader
- James Wallace (Royal Navy officer) (1731–1803), Royal Navy officer
- Lew Wallace (1827–1905), American Civil War general and author
- Martin Wallace (soldier) (born 1969), Australian SASR soldier
- Martin R. M. Wallace (1829–1902), American Union brevet brigadier general
- Robert Wallace (British Army officer) (1860–1929), Irish lawyer, soldier and politician
- Samuel Thomas Dickson Wallace (1892–1968), Scottish soldier
- W. H. L. Wallace (1821–1862), Union general in the American Civil War
- William Wallace (died 1305), Scottish landowner, one of the main leaders during the wars of Scottish Independence
- William Henry Wallace (1827–1901), Confederate general and South Carolina state legislator
- William Miller Wallace (1844–1924), U.S. Army general

=== Law ===
- John Wallace (New Zealand judge) (1934–2012), chairman of the Royal Commission on the Electoral System, 1986
- John Clifford Wallace (born 1928), United States federal judge
- John E. Wallace Jr. (born 1942), former New Jersey Supreme Court justice
- John William Wallace (1815–1884), American lawyer
- Michael Wallace (lawyer) (born 1951), American lawyer
- William James Wallace (1837–1917), lawyer and federal judge in the United States
- William Robert Wallace (1886–1960), American judge
- William T. Wallace (1828–1909), Chief Justice of the Supreme Court of California and an Attorney General of California

=== Media (actors, artists, writers, journalists) ===
- Amy Wallace (1955–2013), American writer
- Andree Wallace, American actress
- André Wallace (born 1947), English sculptor
- Andy Wallace (producer) (born 1947), American music studio engineer
- Anne Wallace (born 1970), Australian painter
- Barbara Brooks Wallace (1922–2018), American children's writer
- Benjamin Wallace (writer), American author and magazine writer
- Beryl Wallace (1912–1948), American singer, dancer, and actress
- Bill Wallace (author) (1947–2012), American author
- Bronwen Wallace (1945–1989), Canadian poet and short story writer
- Chris Wallace (born 1947), American newscaster at ABC, NBC, and Fox News
- Chris Wallace-Crabbe (1934–2025), Australian poet
- Christine Wallace (born 1960), Australian journalist and author
- Claire Wallace (broadcaster) (1900 or 1906–1968), Canadian journalist and broadcaster
- Daniel Wallace (author) (born 1959), American author
- Danny Wallace (humourist) (born 1976), British comedian, author and presenter
- David Wallace (American actor) (born 1958), American actor
- David Foster Wallace (1962–2008), American novelist
- Dee Wallace (born 1948), American actress
- DeWitt Wallace (1889–1981), American co-founder of Reader's Digest magazine
- Donald Mackenzie Wallace (1841–1919), British public servant, journalist and author
- Dougie Wallace, Scots photographer
- Ed Wallace (1953–2025), American radio personality
- Edgar Wallace (1875–1932), British crime writer
- George Wallace (American comedian) (born 1952), American comedian
- Ginger Wallace (1924–2010), American artist
- Gregg Wallace (born 1964) English broadcaster
- Ian Wallace (author) (1912–1998), American science fiction author
- Ian Wallace (artist) (born 1943), pioneer of Vancouver's conceptual art movement
- Ian Wallace (illustrator), Canadian illustrator of children's books
- Ian Wallace (photographer) (born 1972), Tasmanian landscape photographer
- Irving Wallace (1916–1990), American author and screenwriter
- Jean Wallace (1923–1990), American actress
- Jessie Wallace (born 1971), English actress
- John Graham Wallace (born 1966), English author of children's books
- Kathleen Kemarre Wallace (born 1948), Australian Aboriginal artist
- Kathryn Ann Wallace (born 1975), American television and film journalist
- Kevin Wallace (theatre producer) (born 1957), Irish theatrical producer
- Lila Bell Wallace (1889–1984), American co-founder of Reader's Digest magazine
- Louise Wallace (born 1959), New Zealand television presenter, actress and director
- Louise Wallace (writer) (born 1983), New Zealand poet
- Marcia Wallace (1942–2013), American actress
- Marjorie Wallace (born 1954), American model, actress and presenter
- Mike Wallace (1918–2012), American television correspondent
- Morgan Wallace (1881–1953), American actor
- Naomi Wallace (born 1960), American playwright, screenwriter and poet
- Nick Wallace (born 1972), British author
- Nicolle Wallace (born 1972), American television host, author, and former political figure
- Pierce Wallace (born 1995), American sports fan and television personality
- Randall Wallace (born 1949), American writer and film director
- Richard Wallace (director) (1894–1951), American film director
- Richard Wallace (journalist) (born 1961), British newspaper editor
- Rowena Wallace (born 1947), English-born Australian actress
- Tommy Lee Wallace (born 1949), American film producer, director and screenwriter
- William O. Wallace (1906–1968), American Hollywood set decorator
- William Ross Wallace (1819–1881), American poet
- D'Angelo Wallace (born 1998), American YouTuber

=== Musicians ===
- Aria Wallace (born 1996), American actress and singer
- Beryl Wallace (1912–1948), American singer, dancer and actress
- Bill Wallace (musician) (born 1949), Canadian rock-and-roll musician
- Chris Wallace (musician) (born 1985), lead vocalist for The White Tie Affair
- Christopher George Latore Wallace (1972–1997), American rap artist The Notorious B.I.G.
- Emmett "Babe" Wallace (1909–2006), American composer, singer, actor
- Frank Wallace (piper) (fl. late 1800s), Irish musician
- Ian Wallace (drummer) (1946–2007), drummer with King Crimson, Bob Dylan, and many others
- Ian Wallace (singer) (1919–2009), singer and contestant on My Music
- Jerry Wallace (1928–2008), American country and pop singer
- John Wallace (musician) (fl. 1971– present), American bassist and singer
- John Wallace (trumpeter) (1949–2026), Scottish trumpeter
- John Bruce Wallace (born 1950), American musician and artist
- Michael Wallace (piper) (fl. late 1800s), Irish musician
- Simon Wallace (born 1957), British composer and pianist
- Sippie Wallace (1898–1986), American singer-songwriter
- Stewart Wallace (born 1960), American composer
- Terry Wallace Jr. (born 1994), American rapper Tee Grizzley
- Wesley Wallace dates unknown), American blues and boogie-woogie pianist
- William Wallace (Scottish composer) (1860–1940), Scottish composer
- William Vincent Wallace (1812–1865), Irish composer

=== Politics and business ===
- Ben Wallace (politician) (born 1970), British Conservative politician
- Bob Wallace (computer scientist) (1949–2002), American software developer & programmer
- Carleton Lyman Wallace (1866–1919), American lawyer and Minnesota state legislator
- Dan Wallace (politician) (born 1942), Irish Fianna Fáil politician
- David Wallace (Indiana politician) (1799–1859), 6th Governor of Indiana
- David G. Wallace, American businessman and politician, mayor of Sugar Land, Texas
- David Wardrope Wallace (1850–1924), Canadian MP for Russell, 1903–1904
- Elizabeth Virginia Wallace (1885–1982), birth name of Bess Truman, wife of U.S. President Harry S. Truman
- Euan Wallace (1892–1941), British Conservative politician
- G. Frank Wallace (1887–1964), New York state senator
- Georg Wallace (1804–1890), Norwegian politician.
- George Wallace (1919–1998), American politician and segregationist who served as the 45th Governor of Alabama
- George Wallace Jr. (born 1951), American politician
- Henry A. Wallace (1888–1965), 33rd Vice President of the United States
- Henry Cantwell Wallace (1866–1924), American farmer, journalist and political activist
- I. T. A. Wallace-Johnson (1894–1965), Sierra Leonean journalist, activist and politician
- Jim Wallace, Baron Wallace of Tankerness (1954–2026), British politician and Deputy First Minister of Scotland
- John Wallace (Australian politician) (1828–1901), Australian politician
- John Wallace (Canadian politician) (1812–1896), New Brunswick farmer and member of the Canadian House of Commons
- John Wallace (English politician) (1840–1910), English politician
- John Wallace (Florida politician) (1842–1908), Florida Republican politician
- John Wallace (Scottish politician) (1868–1949), Member of Parliament for Dumfermline Burghs
- John Alexander Wallace (1881–1961), Canadian politician
- John D. Wallace (born 1949), Canadian politician
- John Winfield Wallace (1818–1889), US Congressman from Pennsylvania
- Jonathan H. Wallace (1824–1892), United States Congressman
- Lurleen Wallace (1926–1968), 46th Governor of Alabama
- Marjorie Wallace (SANE) (born 1945), British writer, broadcaster, investigative journalist, charity executive
- Mark Wallace (born 1967), American businessman, former diplomat, and lawyer
- Martin Kelso Wallace (1898–1978), Irish Lord Mayor of Belfast
- Mary Wallace (born 1959), Irish Fianna Fáil politician
- Maynard Wallace (1943–2021), American politician
- Michael Wallace (politician) (c.1744–1831), Scottish-born merchant, judge and political figure in Nova Scotia
- Mick Wallace (born 1955), Irish politician, football manager and property developer
- Mike Wallace (politician) (born 1963), Canadian politician
- Peggy Wallace (1943–2020), American politician
- Robert Wallace (Canadian politician) (1820–?), Canadian Member of Parliament
- Robert Wallace (Edinburgh MP) (1831–1899), British Member of Parliament for Edinburgh East, 1886–1899
- Robert Wallace (MP for Greenock) (1773–1855), Scottish politician, MP for Greenock, 1832–1845
- Robert Wallace (MP for Perth) (1850–1939), Irish-born politician, MP for Perth, 1895–1907
- Robert B. Wallace (c. 1869–1928), American politician
- Robert M. Wallace (1856–1942), United States Representative from Arkansas
- Samuel Wallace MacDowell III (1846–1908), a leading voice in the abolitionist movement of Brazil.
- William Wallace (Canadian politician) (1820–1887), Scottish-born merchant and politician in Ontario
- William A. Wallace (1827–1896), U.S. Senator from Pennsylvania
- William C. Wallace (1856–1901), U.S. Representative from New York
- William H. Wallace (1811–1879), first territorial governor and Congressional delegate from Idaho Territory
- William J. Wallace (Indianapolis mayor), 7th Mayor of Indianapolis, Indiana

=== Religion ===
- Brian Wallace (born 1962), American Anglican suffragan bishop
- Duncan Wallace (1938–2015), Canadian Anglican Bishop of Qu'Appelle
- Foy E. Wallace (1896–1979), American Churches of Christ minister
- John Wallace (bishop) (1654–1733), Scottish Roman Catholic prelate
- Martin Wallace (bishop) (born 1948), English Anglican Bishop of Selby
- Robert Wallace (minister) (1697–1771), minister of the Church of Scotland and writer on population
- Robert Wallace (Unitarian) (1791–1850), English Unitarian minister
- William Wallace (Jesuit) (1863–1922), Irish Jesuit and Indologist

=== Sport ===
- A. J. Wallace (American football) (born 1988), American football player
- Alexander Wallace (footballer) (1874–1899), English footballer
- Andy Wallace (racing driver) (born 1961), British race car driver
- Ben Wallace (basketball) (born 1974), American basketball player
- Bill Wallace (American football) (1912–1993), American football player
- Bill Wallace (martial artist) (born 1945), American karateka and kickboxer
- Billy Wallace (rugby union) (1878–1972), New Zealand rugby union player
- B. J. Wallace (born 1971), former American Minor League Baseball pitcher
- Bo Wallace (born 1992), American football player
- Bob Wallace (American football) (born 1945), former American football player
- Bob Wallace (footballer born 1948), English footballer
- Bob Wallace (footballer born 1893) (1893–1970), Scottish footballer for Nottingham Forest
- Bob Wallace (test driver) (1938–2013), New Zealand racing driver and auto engineer
- Bobby Wallace (American football) (born 1954), American college football coach
- Bobby Wallace (baseball) (1873–1960), American baseball player
- Bubba Wallace (born 1993), American racing driver
- Caedan Wallace (born 2000), American football player
- Chris Wallace (American football) (born 1975), American football quarterback
- Chris Wallace (basketball), American basketball executive, scout, and manager
- Chrissy Wallace (born 1988), American race car driver
- Dave Wallace (baseball) (born 1947), American baseball coach and player
- David Wallace (catcher) (born 1979), American professional baseball player
- David Wallace (footballer), New Zealand international soccer player
- David Wallace (rugby union) (born 1976), Irish rugby union player
- Derek Wallace (born 1971), American baseball player
- Doc Wallace (1893–1964), American baseball player
- Don Wallace (born 1940), American baseball player
- Dougie Wallace (soccer) (1919–1999), South African soccer player
- Frank Wallace (soccer) (1922–1979), American soccer player, nicknamed "Pee Wee"
- Gerald Wallace (born 1982), American basketball player
- Harold Wallace (born 1975), Costa Rican soccer player
- Harrison Wallace III (born 2003), American football player
- Heather Wallace (born 1961), Canadian squash player
- Huck Wallace (1882–1951), American baseball player
- Ian Wallace (footballer) (born 1956), Scottish international footballer
- Isabelle Wallace (born 1996), Australian tennis player
- Jack Wallace (American football) (1925–1995), American football player and coach
- Jack Wallace (catcher) (1890–1960), American baseball player
- Jackie Wallace (born 1951), American football player
- Jarrod Wallace (born 1991), Australian Rugby League player
- Jilly Wallace (born 1964), British freestyle skier and mother of Lloyd
- Jock Wallace Jr. (1935–1996), Scottish football player and manager
- John Wallace (American football coach), college football coach, head football coach at Rutgers University
- John Wallace (basketball) (born 1974), American basketball player
- John Wallace (cricketer) (1924–2008), South African-born first-class cricketer, who played for Rhodesia
- John Wallace (rower) (born 1962), Canadian rower
- John Wallace (sailor) (1903–1990), American sailor
- Johnnie Wallace (1900–1975), Australia & Scotland international rugby union player
- Jonathan Wallace (born 1986), American basketball player
- Joe Wallace (footballer) (1933–1993), Scottish footballer
- Keith Wallace (boxer) (1961–2000), English professional and Olympic boxer
- Ken Wallace (canoeist) (born 1983), Australian sprint canoer
- Ken Wallace (cricketer) (born 1936), English cricketer
- Kenny Wallace (born 1963), American stock car driver, former TV commentator
- Kristy Wallace (born 1996), Australian basketball player
- K'Von Wallace (born 1997), American football player
- Lee Wallace (born 1987), Scottish football player
- Levi Wallace (born 1995), American football player
- Lloyd Wallace (born 1995), British freestyle skier and son of Jilly
- Mark Wallace (cricketer) (born 1981), Welsh cricketer
- Matt Wallace (golfer) (born 1990), English golfer
- Matt Wallace (racing driver) (born 1995), American race car driver
- Merv Wallace (1916–2008), New Zealand cricketer
- Mike Wallace (American football) (born 1986), American football wide receiver
- Mike Wallace (baseball) (born 1951), American baseball player
- Mike Wallace (racing driver) (born 1959), American race car driver
- Nancy Wallace (Pearson), American curler
- Peter Wallace (rugby league) (born 1985), Australian Rugby League player
- Philo Wallace (born 1970), Barbadian cricketer
- Raphael Wallace (born 1957), Nevisian cricketer
- Rasheed Wallace (born 1974), American basketball player
- Robin Wallace, British freestyle skier
- Rod Wallace (born 1969), English football player
- Ross Wallace (born 1985), Scottish football player
- Rusty Wallace (born 1956), American NASCAR driver
- Seneca Wallace (born 1980), American football player
- Skylar Wallace (born 2000), American softball player
- Steve Wallace (American football) (born 1964), American football player
- Steve Wallace (NASCAR) (born 1987), American race car driver
- Terry Wallace (born 1958), Australian football player and coach
- Trevin Wallace (born 2003), American college football player
- Tylan Wallace (born 1999), American football player
- William Wallace (rower) (1904–1967), Canadian Olympic rower
- William Middleton Wallace (died 1915), Scottish rugby player
- Willie Wallace (born 1940), Scottish footballer

=== Fiction ===
- Barret Wallace, fictional character in Final Fantasy VII
- Beth Wallace, fictional character in the soap opera Passions
- Chris Wallace (EastEnders), an EastEnders character
- Eli Wallace, fictional character on the TV science fiction drama series Stargate Universe
- Marsellus Wallace, fictional gangster portrayed by Ving Rhames in the 1994 film Pulp Fiction
- Nathan Wallace, fictional character in Repo! The Genetic Opera
- Nicole Wallace (Law & Order: Criminal Intent), fictional character on the TV drama series Law & Order: Criminal Intent
- Shilo Wallace, fictional character in Repo! The Genetic Opera
- Wallace Wallace, fictional character in No More Dead Dogs who was always on detention.
- Wallace, fictional character in Wallace & Gromit who is a good-natured, eccentric and cheese-loving bachelor inventor
- Wallace Wells, fictional character in Scott Pilgrim vs. the World who is Scott Pilgrim's sarcastic, stylish, and supportive best friend and former roommate

=== Other ===
- Andrew Wallace (shooting victim) (died 2005), Belizean teenager
- Benjamin Wallace (circus owner) (1847–1921), American circus owner
- David A. Wallace (1917–2004), American urban planner, architect, and educator
- Felicity Wallace, New Zealand architect
- Frank Wallace (gangster) (before 1910–1931), Irish-American gangster from South Boston
- Hamish Wallace (born 1956), paediatric oncologist
- Hugh Wallace (architect) (1956–2025), Irish architect and television presenter
- John Findley Wallace (1852–1921), American engineer, worked on the Panama Canal
- John-Paul Wallace (born 1976), English chess player
- Joseph Wallace (1989–1993), American murder victim
- Keith Wallace (wine writer), wine columnist, journalist and wine school founder
- Martin Wallace (game designer), English game designer
- Michele Wallace (born 1952), African American feminist and author
- Minik Wallace (c. 1890–1918), Greenland-born Inuk brought to America for study
- Nancy Wallace (environmentalist) (1930–2024), American environmentalist
- Nancy G. Wallace, Wyoming politician
- Peter Wallace (buccaneer) (fl. 1630s), Anglo-Scottish buccaneer in the Bay of Honduras
- Sir Richard Wallace, 1st Baronet (1818–1890), English art collector
- Richetta Randolph Wallace (1884–1971), American administrator and campaigner
- Sanford Wallace (born 1968), American spammer and DJ, self-proclaimed "Spam King"
- Staker Wallace (1733–1798), United Irishman who rebelled against the British
- William Wallace (mason) (died 1631), Scottish master mason and architect
- William A. A. Wallace (1817–1899), American Texas Ranger captain with the nickname "Bigfoot"
- William Herbert Wallace (1878–1933), English convicted 'murderer', later found to be innocent on appeal
- William Kelly Wallace (1883–1969), Irish railway engineer
- William Roy Wallace (architect) (1889–1983), American architect
- William Wallace Lincoln (1850–1862), son of Abraham Lincoln

== See also ==
- Clan Wallace
- Wallace (given name)
- Wallace (disambiguation)
- Wallis (surname)
- Battle of Val-ès-Dunes
