= Wallace =

Wallace may refer to:

== People ==
- Clan Wallace in Scotland
- Wallace (given name)
- Wallace (surname)
- Wallace (footballer, born 1986), full name Wallace Fernando Pereira, Brazilian football left-back
- Wallace (footballer, born 1987), full name Wallace Reis da Silva, Brazilian football centre-back
- Wallace (footballer, born May 1994), full name Wallace Oliveira dos Santos, Brazilian football full-back
- Wallace (footballer, born October 1994), full name Wallace Fortuna dos Santos, Brazilian football centre-back
- Wallace (footballer, born 1998), full name Wallace Menezes dos Santos, Brazilian football midfielder
- Wallace Pernambucano (born 1987), full name Wallace Philipe Freitas da Silva, Brazilian football forward

== Fictional characters ==
- Wallace, from Wallace and Gromit
- Wallace (The Wire)
- Wallace the Brave, the titular character of the comic strip
- Wallace West (character), from DC Comics
- Wallace Wells, from the Scott Pilgrim media franchise
- Wallace, champion in Pokémon emerald.

== Places ==
=== Canada ===
- Wallace, Nova Scotia, a rural community
- Wallace Ridge, Nova Scotia
- Wallace, Ontario, a rural community
- Rural Municipality of Wallace – Woodworth, Manitoba
- Rural Municipality of Wallace No. 243, Saskatchewan

=== United States ===
- Wallace House (disambiguation), several historic structures
- Wallace, California, census-designated place
- Wallace, Idaho, city
- Wallace, Indiana, town
- Wallace, Kansas, city
- Wallace, Louisiana, census-designated place
- Wallace, Menominee County, Michigan, community in Michigan's Upper Peninsula
- Wallace, Alcona County, Michigan
- Wallace, Missouri, an unincorporated community
- Wallace, Nebraska, village
- Wallace, North Carolina, town
- Wallace, South Carolina, unincorporated community
- Wallace, South Dakota, town
- Wallace, Harrison County, West Virginia, census-designated place
- Wallace Ridge, Louisiana, census-designated place
- Wallace Township, LaSalle County, Illinois
- Wallace Township, Pennsylvania

=== Other places ===
- Wallace (lunar crater)
- Wallace (Martian crater)
- Wallace, Victoria, a town in Australia
- Wallace Air Station, Luzon, Philippines
- Wallace Collection, a museum in London
- Wallace County (disambiguation)
- Wallace Creek, a river in Texas
- Wallace Line, a faunal boundary line dividing the ecologies of Asia and Australia
- Wallace Monument, Stirling, Scotland
- Cape Wallace, South Shetland Islands, Antarctica

== Other uses ==
- Wallace v. Jaffree, 1985 US Supreme Court case
- Wallace (New Zealand electorate), a former New Zealand parliamentary electorate
- Wallace fountain, public drinking fountains in Paris
- Wallace tree, hardware implementation of digital circuit that multiplies two integers
- The Wallace and Ladmo Show, children's television program
- Westland Wallace, a British inter-war biplane
- Wallace (currently Wallace VI), St. Bernard mascot of The Canadian Scottish Regiment (Princess Mary's)
- Wallace, Fujian Food Co., owner of CNHLS, a fast food chain in China
- HMS Wallace, the original name of HMAS Vampire (D68)
- Wallace (pitbull)
- Wallace Oak (disambiguation), several trees named for William Wallace

== See also ==
- Wallis (disambiguation)
- The Wallace (disambiguation)
- Justice Wallace (disambiguation)
- Wallacetown, New Zealand
