= Mallace =

Mallace is a surname. Notable people with the surname include:

- Calum Mallace (born 1990), Scottish-born American soccer player
- Craig Mallace (born 1985), Scottish-born American soccer player and coach, brother of Calum

== See also ==
- Wallace (surname)
