= Wallace Oak =

Several trees in Scotland have been named the Wallace Oak for their association with William Wallace:

- Wallace Oak (Elderslie)
- Wallace Oak (Port Glasgow)
- Wallace Oak (Torwood)
