= Frank Wallace =

Frank Wallace may refer to:

- Frank Wallace (piper), Irish musician, fl. late 1800s
- Frank Wallace (politician) (1861–1925), Australian politician
- Frank Wallace (gangster) (before 1910–1931), Irish-American gangster from South Boston
- Frank Wallace (soccer) (1922–1979), American soccer player, nicknamed "Pee Wee"
- Frank R. Wallace (1932–2006), author and philosopher
- G. Frank Wallace (1887–1964), New York state senator
- Frank Wallace, stage name for Frank Szatkus (born 1890/1891), vaudeville performer and first husband of Mae West
