= Wallace Building =

Wallace Building may refer to:

in the United States (by state)

- Wallace Building (Little Rock, Arkansas), listed on the NRHP in Arkansas
- Wallace Block-Old Saline Village Hall, Saline, Michigan, listed on the National Register of Historic Places in Washtenaw County, Michigan
- 56 Pine Street, in Manhattan, New York City, listed on the NRHP in New York, originally known as the Wallace Building
- The Plaza (Salisbury, North Carolina), known as the Wallace Building from 1914 to 1989

== See also ==
- Wallace House (disambiguation)
