= General Wallace =

General Wallace may refer to:

- Christopher Wallace (British Army officer) (1943–2016), British Army lieutenant general
- Clarence R. Wallace (1897–1988), U.S. Marine Corps brigadier general
- Daniel Wallace (politician) (1801–1859), South Carolina State Militia major general
- James Maxwell Wallace (1783–1867), British Army general
- John Alexander Wallace (British Army officer) (c. 1775–1857), British Army general
- Lew Wallace (1827–1905), Union Army major general
- Peter Margetson Wallace (1780–1864), British Army general
- W. H. L. Wallace (1821–1862), Union Army brigadier general
- William J. Wallace (USMC) (1895–1977, U.S. Marine Corps lieutenant general
- William Henry Wallace (1827–1901), Confederate States Army brigadier general
- William Miller Wallace (1844–1924), U.S. Army brigadier general
- William S. Wallace (born 1946), U.S. Army four-star general
- William Wallace (c. 1270–1305), Scottish general

== See also ==
- Lewis Bayly Wallis (1775–1848), British Army general
- Attorney General Wallace (disambiguation)
