= Wallace Oak (Port Glasgow) =

Oak tree at Port Glasgow, Scotland (felled 1995)

- Interactive map of Wallace Oak
- Location: Port Glasgow, Scotland
- Date felled: 1995

The Wallace Oak was a tree at Port Glasgow, Scotland. It is linked in legend to the Scottish independence leader William Wallace who is said to have been chained to the tree in 1304/05 after his capture by English forces. The tree was starting to decay by the 18th century and was treated with pitch. It also had chains added to strengthen its branches, which may be the origin of the Wallace myth. The tree fell during a storm in 1995 but some of its timber has been preserved. A proposal was made in 2019 to erect a monument to the tree.

== Connection with Wallace ==
The tree stood near the present-day location of the Holy Family Roman Catholic Church on Parkhill Avenue in Port Glasgow. The tree is linked to a legend associated with Scottish independence leader William Wallace. Scottish historian David R. Ross stated in his 1998 work On the Trail of William Wallace that Wallace was captured by the English at Robroyston, near Glasgow and brought across the River Clyde by the ferry at Port Glasgow. He was held in the village for a period whilst troops were assembled to escort him to London for trial. It is said that Wallace was chained to the oak tree during this time.

Reliable information about Wallace's movements between Autumn 1304 and his execution on 23 August 1305 is scarce and it is thought that legends have sprung up to fill the gaps. However the story of the Wallace Oak at Port Glasgow has a particularly long history. The chains are said to have been left on the tree after Wallace was removed. Local children are reported to have painted the chains red each year to symbolise the blood shed by Wallace in the cause of Scottish independence and the chains replaced each time they rusted away over the years.

An alternative version of the story states that Wallace escaped from the English who had cornered him at Elderslie. He is then said to have fled to Port Glasgow and evaded English patrols by hiding in the branches of the Wallace Oak.

== Recent history ==
The tree was starting to decay by 1768; William Cunningham, 13th Earl of Glencairn ordered the affected portion cut away and the wound filled with boiling pitch. Cunningham is also said to have added chains to the tree to strengthen its branches, which may well be the origin of the chained Wallace myth. The chains were subsequently partially encapsulated by the tree as it grew. Some of the surviving chain has been dated to the late-19th or early-20th centuries.

In 1962 the tree was the subject of an article in the Greenock Telegraph which described efforts to save it. Despite this the tree fell during a storm in 1995. Some of the remains were taken to the nearby Gourock Ropeworks yard for safekeeping and some left in situ. A dendrochronological analysis of some of the remaining timber dated it to 1786. It is thought that this segment would have been from approximately 2 metres above ground level, which would date the start of the growth to around 1762. it is possible that this section was from regrowth stimulated by Cunnigham's intervention in 1768. An analysis of older sections of the trunk could not be carried out but may well be several hundred years earlier.

In October 2019 planning permission was applied for to construct a monument to the oak in the grounds of the church. Designed by the local firm Nicholson McShane Architects, it would comprise a granite representation of a split tree trunk with a metal chain around its base. The memorial was unveiled on 23 October 2021. The last remaining part of the fallen oak was moved and put on display at Hunterston Castle, ancient seat of the Clan Hunter, in August 2022.
