= Disc dog =

Dog sport

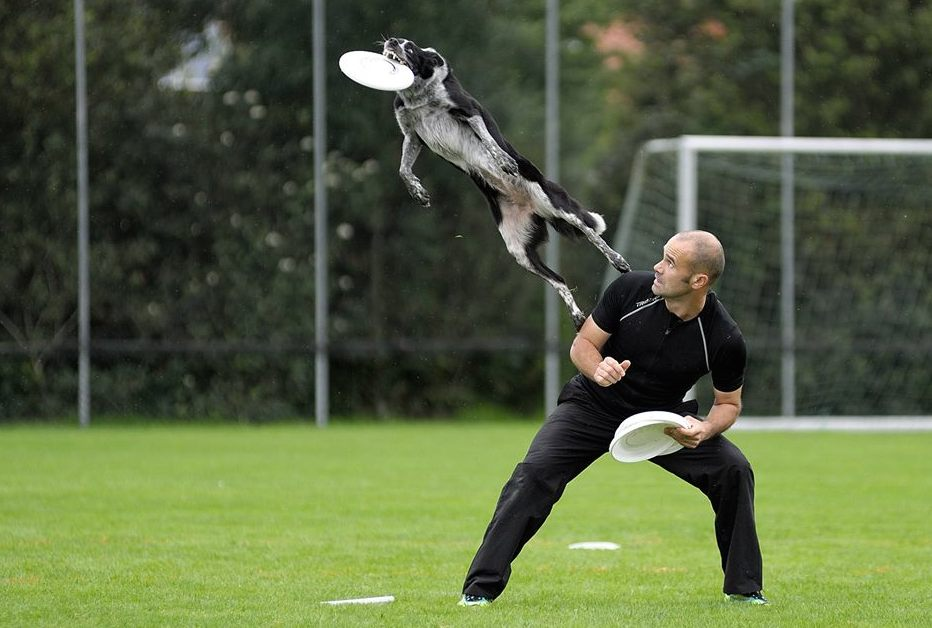
Adrian Stoica and Rory, 2014: World Champions (UFO) and European Champions (AWI, UFO, Skyhoundz)

Disc dog (commonly called Frisbee dog) is a dog sport. In disc dog competitions, dogs and their human flying disc throwers compete in events such as distance catching and somewhat choreographed freestyle catching. The sport celebrates the bond between handler and dog, by allowing them to work together. The term "disc" is preferred because "Frisbee" is a trademark (held by Wham-O) for a brand of flying disc.

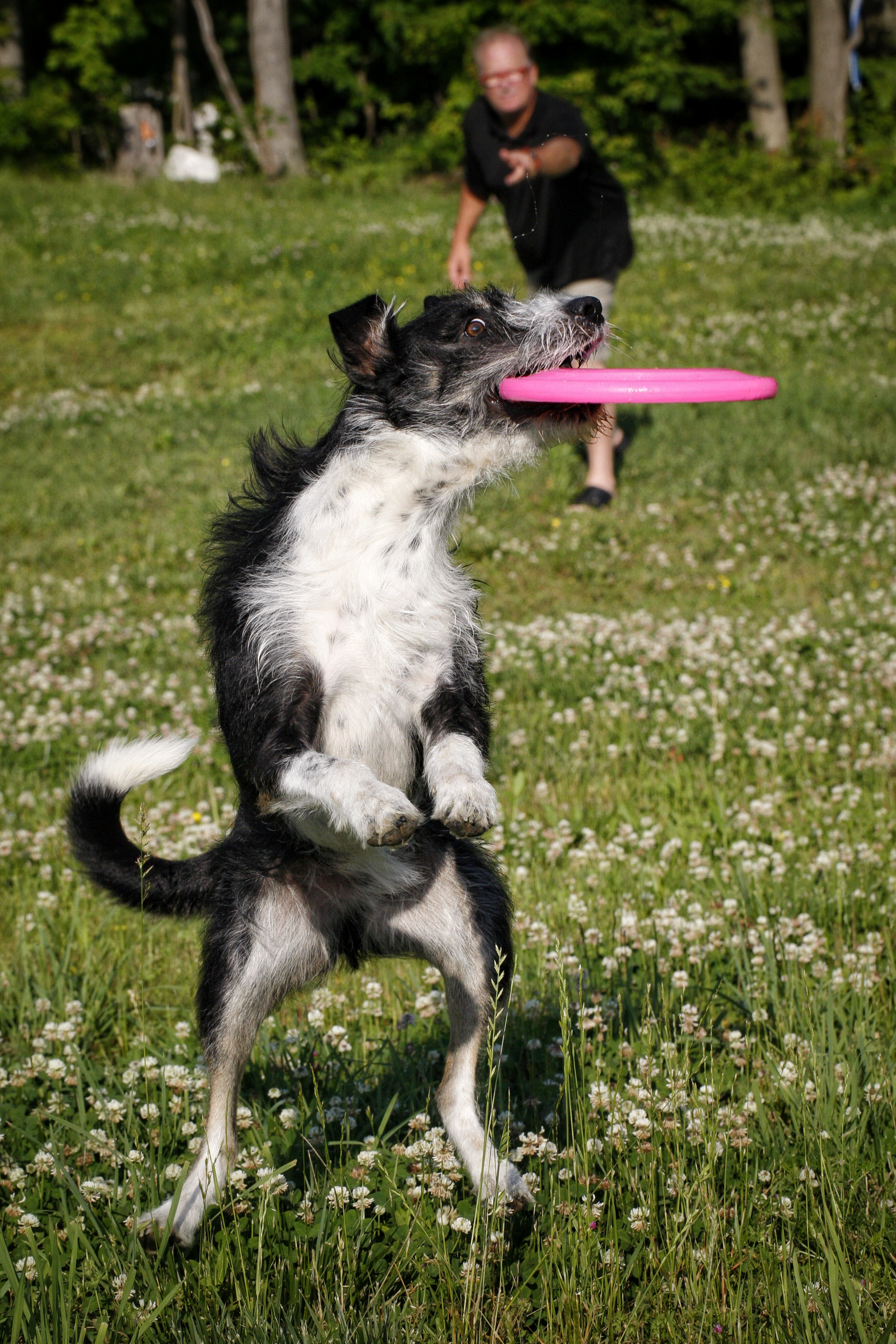
A dog catching a disc in the air

== History ==
The sport got its start in the early 1970s, paralleling the rise in popularity of Frisbee sport. The definitive moment came on August 5, 1974, when Alex Stein, a 19-year-old college student from Ohio, and his dog, Ashley Whippet, jumped the fence at a nationally broadcast baseball game between the Los Angeles Dodgers and the Cincinnati Reds. Stein had with him a couple of flying discs, which he threw for the dog. Ashley astonished the crowd with his disc-catching, as he ran up to 35 miles per hour (56 km/h) and leaped 9 feet (2.7 m) in the air to snag the disc. The stunt was so novel that the game was stopped and Joe Garagiola continued to announce the flying disc action on the field. Finally, after eight minutes, Stein was escorted off the field and arrested. The nationally televised exhibition of Ashley's skill did much to fuel interest in the sport.

Stein worked with Irv Lander and Eldon McIntire to create the Frisbee Dog World Championship for people and their dogs. Even today, Stein and McIntire continue to contribute to the sport.

== Format ==
Teams of one person and one dog compete in the standard distance "toss and fetch" event. Points are awarded to the team for catches at varying distances. Competitions also often feature the dynamic freestyle event, which consists of short routines choreographed to music with multiple discs in play. The less common long-distance events have various formats, but generally the longest catch wins.

Divisions in disc dog events are usually based on the skill and experience of the handler. Men and women generally compete in the same divisions for all disciplines, although the long distance category is sometimes divided by gender.

=== Toss and fetch ===
Short-distance events go by many names, including toss and fetch, mini-distance, throw and catch, and distance/accuracy. The concept is generally the same. Contestants have 60 seconds to make as many throws as possible on a field marked with increasingly longer distances. The distances generally do not exceed 50 metres (160 ft) for the longest catches. Dogs are awarded points for catches based on the distance of the throw, with mid-air catches rating extra points (in most contests an extra half point when the dog is completely airborne for the catch). Only one disc is used for these events.

=== Freestyle ===
Freestyle is a subjectively judged event, similar to freestyle events like skateboard and snowboard half-pipe, or freestyle footbag (hacky sack). The team consists of one person (handler) and his or her dog. Depending on the event, the length of a routine might be anywhere from one minute and 30 seconds all the way to two minutes. Teams are judged in categories that include canine athleticism, degree of difficulty, showmanship, and so forth. Incredible flips, hyperfast multiple catches, and spectacular vaults make freestyle a popular event with spectators, and it is regarded as the highest level of competitive accomplishment.

=== Long distance ===
The Quadruped was an NFL draft day competition held in April 1996 for the Jacksonville Jaguars. This competition format is older than all other disc dog competition formats other than the Ashley Whippet and the FDDO formats. Originally a halftime show for football games with four frisbee dog teams competing to be the last team standing. It turned into an open competition where many more than four teams were able to compete. Today we have the Quadruped Series, a group of competitions that are a points championship in the United States. The popularity has been so great within the frisbee dog world that it has spread to Europe where it has occurred in several countries.

== Competitions ==
Today there are several organizations running disc dog tournaments. Most competitions take place in the summer on flat, grassy fields. Winter disc dog contests on soft snow are also popular in places.

=== Ashley Whippet Invitational ===
The Canine Frisbee Disc World Championship (also called the World Finals Championship) was long considered the crowning culmination of the sport.

=== Skyhoundz ===
In 2000, Skyhoundz staged its very first World Canine Disc Championship, sponsored by Hyperflite. The Hyperflite Skyhoundz World Canine Disc Championship Series is now the largest disc dog competition series in the world and features, each year, more than 100 competitions held in the U.S. and other countries, as well as U.S. Local Championships, State Championships, DiscDogathon Championship Qualifiers, a DiscDogathon World Championship, Xtreme Distance Championship Qualifiers, an Xtreme Distance World Championship, U.S. Regional Qualifiers, Open Qualifiers, International Qualifiers, a European Championship, and the World Championship. In 2011, the Hyperflite Skyhoundz Series will be expanded to include a week-long World Championship extravaganza that will include a World Canine Disc Championship in five Divisions (Open, Sport, Pairs Freestyle, MicroDog, and Youth) as well as an Xtreme Distance World Championship (and associated Last Chance Open Qualifier), and a DiscDogathon World Championship (and associated Last Chance Open Qualifier). Participants in the week-long Skyhoundz World Championship will have at least three opportunities at various Last Chance Open Qualifiers to qualify for the remaining invitations to compete for World Championship titles. Skyhoundz is the only canine disc organization to offer disc dog titling in conjunction with its competition series.

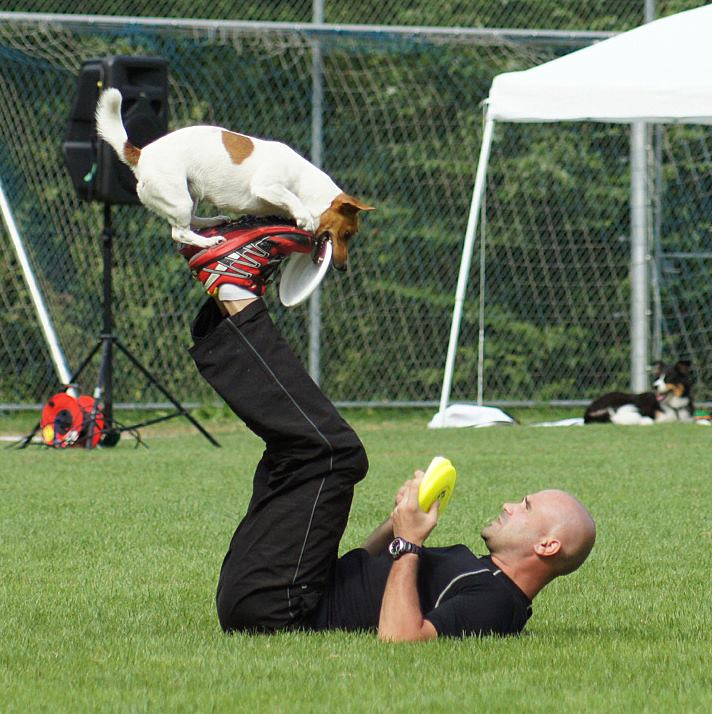
Adrian Stoica and THINKERBELL: European Champion Skyhoundz 2014 (Microdog)

=== UFO ===
The UFO organization runs the UFO World Cup Series. The series is a "points series", similar to World Cup Skiing or NASCAR. The series culminates in World Cup Final. In 2006, UFO also ran the AWI World Championship in Scottsdale, Arizona.

=== The Quadruped ===
The oldest and most popular long-distance frisbee dog competition in the frisbee dog world.

=== Other disc dog organizations ===
The US Disc Dog Nationals (USDDN), which has clubs organizing events in the US, Japan, the Netherlands, Italy, Germany, Poland, Czech Republic, Hungary, Canada, Australia and Turkey holds a championship series known as the USDDN Finals and US Disc Dog International Finals. Other competitions are sponsored by the Quadruped, the Flying Disc Dog Open, and the Purina Incredible Dog Challenge.

The United Kingdom has the UK Disc Dog Association (UKDDA), which held seasonal competitions from March 2018 at The Dog Training Barn, Banbury, Oxfordshire, for the first time ever.

== Popularity ==
Part of the popularity of the sport is its accessibility. All that is necessary to play it is a level playing area, a dog, and a flying disc. Imagination can aid in the experience for Freestyle competition. It is estimated that over one million dogs play flying disc in the United States alone, though only a small percentage participate in organized competitions.

Disc dogs also serve at sporting events as half-time entertainment. Since Ashley's 8^{th} inning performance in 1974, disc dogs have performed at countless football, basketball, baseball and soccer halftimes. They are many times found in amusement parks, county fairs and pet festivals of all kinds. There are a very small handful of trainers who even make a living doing these shows.

== Disc dog clubs ==
Disc dog clubs organize and promote the sport on a local level, and work with national organizations to run events. They offer newcomers a way to learn more about the sport, and are a great place for the experienced competitors to give back. Disc dog clubs are usually active in local animal charities, helping to raise money and awareness for such groups. Disc dog clubs can be found all over the United States, Europe, Asia, Canada and Australia. The first club was the Dallas Dog and Disc Club, founded in the mid-1980s by Ron Ellis.

== Dog discs ==
It is crucial to use a proper dog disc, as those used for Disc Golf and Ultimate are not intended to be used with dogs. When choosing a disc, it should pass at least a small test – it has to be folded in half and regain initial form without damage. Dog discs usually vary in size from 18 to 24 cm in diameter and 90–150 grams in weight and are made of plastic, with lighter discs usually being less puncture and scratch resistant. Discs before play always should be checked for deformations and splinters in order not to damage dogs' teeth and mouth and players' hands.

Some known safe Disc Dog Disc manufacturers:

- Hero Disc USA (US) - Super, Star, Sonic, Atom, Swirl
- Hyperflite (US) - Jawz and Z-Disc Fang
- DISCaLOT (Latvia) - BITEaLOT, FLYaLOT
- Mama Discs (Italy) - Medium, Light
- DTWorld (US) - Eurablend
- Eurodisc (Germany) - PuncMaster
- Latitude (Sweden) - Bite
- Trixie (Germany) - Trixie
- Discrockers (Germany) - Heavy Crusher
- Frisbeescape (Italy) - Raid 3
- K9discs (Belgium) - C-Zenith
- Yikun (China) - Spacedog

== Disc dog training ==
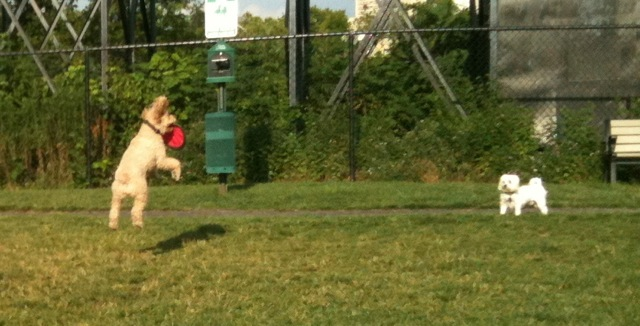
Cockapoo midair catching disc with canine onlooker

Not all dogs immediately understand the concept of the game. A dog may not instinctively know to turn and chase after a disc that is thrown over its head. To begin, the disc should be thrown straight to the dog at a short distance. Once a dog knows how to catch, it can learn the additional concept of running to catch the disc. The disc should be thrown at increasing heights, gradually throwing the disc higher, until it finally goes over the dog's head. At that point the dog instinctively follows the disc all the way around.

== See also ==
- Championship (dog)
- Wallace (pitbull)
