= Wallace House =

Wallace House or Wallace Farm may refer to:

== Places in the United States ==
(by state, then city)

- J. N. Wallace House, Boise, Idaho, listed on the National Register of Historic Places (NRHP) in Ada County, Idaho
- Wallace House (University of Chicago), Illinois
- Henry C. Wallace House, Winterset, Iowa, listed on the NRHP in Madison County, Iowa
- Henry Wallace House, Des Moines, Iowa, NRHP-listed
- Charles Wallace House, Hartford, Kentucky, listed on the NRHP in Ohio County, Kentucky
- Michael Wallace House, Kirksville, Kentucky, listed on the NRHP in Garrard County, Kentucky
- Samuel Wallace House, Midway, Kentucky, listed on the NRHP in Woodford County, Kentucky
- Wallace-Alford Farmstead, Midway, Kentucky, listed on the NRHP in Woodford County, Kentucky
- Napoleon Wallace House, Pierce, Kentucky, listed on the NRHP in Green County, Kentucky
- Wallace House (Walton, Kentucky), listed on the NRHP in Boone County, Kentucky
- Everett Wallace House, Milbridge, Maine, listed on the NRHP in Washington County, Maine
- Wallace House (Independence, Missouri), a National Historic Site
- Wallace House (Lebanon, Missouri), listed on the NRHP in Laclede County, Missouri
- Wallace Farm (Columbia, New Hampshire), NRHP-listed
- Wallace House (Somerville, New Jersey), NRHP-listed
- Jonathan Wallace House, Potsdam, New York, NRHP-listed
- Timothy Wallace House, Rochester, New York, NRHP-listed
- Hambley-Wallace House, Salisbury, North Carolina, listed on the NRHP in Rowan County, North Carolina
- Charlton Wallace House, Cincinnati, Ohio, NRHP-listed
- Wallace Farm (Northfield Center, Ohio), listed on the NRHP in Summit County, Ohio
- Wallace House (fur-trade post), a fur trading station located in the French Prairie in what is now Keizer, Oregon
- Wallace-McGee House, Columbia, South Carolina, NRHP-listed
- Gregg-Wallace Farm Tenant House, near Mars Bluff, South Carolina, NRHP-listed
- Wallace-Hall House, Mansfield, Texas, listed on the NRHP in Tarrant County, Texas
- Thomas Wallace House, Petersburg, Virginia, NRHP-listed
- Wallace-Jagdfeld Octagon House, Fond du Lac, Wisconsin, NRHP-listed

== Persons ==
- Wallace House (politician) (1929–1985) was an educator and politician in Newfoundland, Canada

== See also ==
- Gen. Lew Wallace Study, Crawfordsville, Indiana
- John M. Wallace Fourplex, Portland, Oregon
- Wallace-Baily Tavern, Brier Hill, Pennsylvania
- Wallace-Cross Mill, Felton, Pennsylvania
- Wallace Building (disambiguation)
- Wallace (disambiguation)
