= Walace =

Walace is a given name. It is an alternative spelling of the name Wallace. Notable people with the name include:

- Walace (footballer, born 1989), full name Walace Alves da Silva, Brazilian football centre-back
- Walace (footballer, born 1995), full name Walace Souza Silva, Brazilian football defensive midfielder
- Walace (footballer, born 1993), full name Walace de Sousa Novais, Brazilian football defender

== See also ==
- Wallace (given name)
