= Attorney General Wallace =

Attorney General Wallace may refer to:

- James Wallace (British politician) (1729–1783), Attorney General for England and Wales
- William T. Wallace (1828–1909), Attorney General of California

== See also ==
- General Wallace (disambiguation)
