= Wallace (pitbull) =

White pit bull who became a world champion disc dog

- Species: Dog
- Breed: Pit bull
- Sex: Male
- Owner: Roo Yori
- www.wallacethepitbullfoundation.org

Wallace was a white pit bull who became a world champion disc dog.

== Life and career ==
As a puppy, Wallace was rescued as a puppy from abandoned breeding operation, adopted by a police officer, later ending up at a shelter. In 2005, Roo and Clara Yori adopted Wallace from an animal shelter in Rochester, Minnesota. He became a world champion disc dog. Wallace was diagnosed with cancer just before his 11th birthday, and was euthanized a year later in August 2013.

A symbol of advocacy for pit bulls, Wallace inspired the foundation of an organization to help dogs through physical training, WOD (Workout of the Day) for Dogs, and was the subject of a 2012 book by Jim Gorant.

== Accomplishments ==
- 2006 Cynosport World Champion
- 2007 Purina Pro Plan Incredible Dog Challenge National Champion
- Qualified multiple times for the Ashley Whippet World Championships, the UFO World Finals, the Skyhoundz World Finals, and the USDDN World Finals
