= Judge Wallace =

Judge Wallace may refer to:

- J. Clifford Wallace (born 1928), judge of the United States Court of Appeals for the Ninth Circuit
- William James Wallace (1837–1917), judge of the United States Court of Appeals for the Second Circuit
- William Robert Wallace (1886–1960), judge of the United States District Court for the Eastern District of Oklahoma

== See also ==
- Justice Wallace (disambiguation)
