= Wallace (given name) =

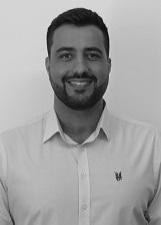
Wallace Brandão, candidate for Vice-Mayor of Belo Horizonte in 2016

Wallace is a Scottish & English given name meaning 'Wales' or 'of Wales,' and may refer to:

- Wallace (footballer, born 1989), Brazilian footballer, most recently played for Rapid Bucharest
- Wallace (footballer, born May 1994), Brazilian footballer
- Wallace (footballer, born October 1994), Brazilian footballer, plays for Lazio
- Wallace (footballer, born 1986), Brazilian footballer
- Wallace W. Andrew (1850–1919), American politician
- Wallace Barnes (1926–2020), American politician
- Wallace Beery (1885–1949), American actor
- Wallace "Wally" Berman (1926–1976), American filmmaker and artist
- Wallace Carothers (1896–1937), inventor of nylon
- Wallace Chung (born 1974), Hong Kong singer and actor
- Wallace E. Conkling (1896–1979), American Episcopal bishop
- Wallace de Souza (born 1987), Brazilian volleyball player generally known simply as "Wallace"
- Wallace A. Gaines (1858–1940), American businessman, funeral director, and political figure
- Wallace H. Graham (1910–1996), White House Physician 1945–1953
- Wallace Wilson Graham (1815–1898), American lawyer and legislator from Wisconsin
- Wallace Gustafson (1925–2018), American lawyer and politician
- Wallace E. Hutton (born 1929), American politician from Maryland
- Wallace Huo (born 1979), Taiwanese actor, singer, and producer
- Wallace Johnson (baseball) (born 1956), American former professional baseball player and coach
- Wallace E. Johnson (1901–1988), co-founder of Holiday Inn
- Wallace F. Johnson (1889–1971), American tennis player
- Wallace J. S. Johnson (1913–1979), Mayor of Berkeley, California during the 1960s
- Wallace W. Johnson (1842-1911), American Medal of Honor recipient
- Wallace Lambert (1922–2009), Canadian psychologist and academic
- Wallace Langham (born 1965), American actor
- Wallace R. Pierson (died 1946), American politician from Connecticut
- Wallace Reid (1891–1923), American actor during the silent-film era
- Wallace M. Rogerson, American exercise leader
- Wallace Arthur Sabin (1869–1937), composer and organist
- Wallace Clement Sabine (1868–1919), founder of acoustic science
- Wallace Shawn (born 1943), American actor, comedian and playwright
- Wallace Stegner (1909–1993), American environmentalist and fiction writer
- Wallace Stevens (1879–1955), American poet
- Wallace Thayer (1866–1944), New York assemblyman
- Wallace Thompson (1896–1952), American lawyer and legislator
- Wallace "Wally" Wolf (1930–1997), American swimmer, water polo player, and Olympic champion
- Wallace "Wally" Wingert (born 1961), American voice actor and former radio personality

== See also ==
- Wallace (disambiguation)
- Wallace (surname)
- Wallis (given name)
- Wally (given name)
- Walace
