= Wallis (surname) =

Wallis is a surname of English and Scottish origin. It is a variant spelling of Wallace, a common family name in Scotland.

The surname may refer to:

- Alfred Wallis (1855–1942), Cornish fisherman and artist.
- Annabelle Wallis (born 1984), British actress
- Barnes Wallis (1887–1979), British scientist - inventor of the bouncing bomb
- Diana Wallis, British politician
- E. A. Wallis Budge (1857–1954), Egyptologist
- F. Kay Wallis (born c. 1944), American traditional healer and politician
- Franz Wenzel von Wallis (1696–1774), Habsburg Austrian field marshal
- Gary Wallis, percussionist for rock group Pink Floyd
- George Olivier, count of Wallis (1671–1743), Habsburg Austrian field marshal
- Glenn Wallis, American writer and musician
- Greg Wallis (b. 1990) American politician
- Gregg Wallis (b. 1982) Baseball coach
- Gustav Wallis (1830–1878), German plant collector
- Hal B. Wallis (1898–1986), American motion picture producer
- Helen Wallis (1924–1995), British librarian and historian
- Henry Wallis (1830–1916), British painter
- Hilda Wallis (1900–1979), Irish tennis player
- Hugh Wallis (died 1994), Australian cinema entrepreneur, founder of Wallis Cinemas in Adelaide
- Jim Wallis, American social justice Christian activist
- Jimmy Wallis, British athlete
- John Wallis (1616–1703), British mathematician
- John Braithwaite Wallis (1877–1961), Canadian entomologist
- Jon Wallis, British professional footballer
- Joni Wallis, American cognitive neurophysiologist
- Katherine Wallis (1861–1957), Canadian artist
- Katie Wallis (born 1984), British Conservative Party politician who, as Jamie Wallis, served as Member of Parliament (MP) for Bridgend in Wales
- Ken Wallis, British pilot
- Larry Wallis (1949–2019), British rock musician
- Maria Wallis (born 1955), Irish Chief Constable
- Michael Wallis (born 1945), American journalist and popular historian
- Olivier, Count of Wallis (1742–1799), Habsburg Austrian general
- Provo Wallis (1791–1892), British Naval officer
- Quvenzhané Wallis, born in 2003, American child actress
- Robert Wallis (engraver), (1794–1878), English engraver
- Ruth Wallis, American singer
- Samuel Wallis (1720–1795), English navigator, for whom Wallis Island is named
- Sarah Wallis (1825–1905), Californian suffragist
- Shani Wallis, British actress and singer
- Stewart Wallis, British economist
- Thomas Wallis (1873–1953), British Art Deco architect. Established Wallis, Gilbert and Partners
- Tryphosa Jane Wallis (1774–1848), British actress
- W. Allen Wallis (1912–1998), American economist and statistician

== Fictional characters ==
- Baron Wallis / Mother's Milk (M.M.), a fictional character in The Boys franchise
  - Janine Wallis, M.M.'s and Monique's daughter
  - Michael Wallis, M.M.'s younger brother
  - Monique Wallis, M.M.'s abusive ex-wife
  - Mother Wallis, M.M.'s deformed mother
  - Mr. Wallis, M.M.'s lawyer father

== See also ==
- Wallis (given name)
- Wallace (surname) (original form)
- Wallis (disambiguation)
