= Brave Tomorrow =

1943-1944 old-time radio soap opera

- Running time: 15 minutes
- Country of origin: United States
- Language(s): English
- Syndicates: NBC
- Written by: Ruth Adams Knight
- Original release: October 11, 1943 – June 30, 1944
- Sponsored by: Ivory Snow

Brave Tomorrow is an old-time radio soap opera in the United States. It was broadcast on NBC October 11, 1943 – June 30, 1944.

== Format ==
Brave Tomorrow focused on Hal and Louise Lambert and the challenges that they faced while raising daughters Jean and Marty during World War II. A continuing facet of the drama was the older daughter's marriage to a military man who was in training to serve overseas.

Ivory Snow sponsored the 15-minute program.

== Personnel ==
The characters on Brave Tomorrow and the actors who portrayed them are shown in the table below.

Character	Actor
Hal Lambert	Raymond Edward Johnson; Roger DeKoven
Louise Lambert	Jeanette Dowling
Jean Lambert	Nancy Douglass; Flora Campbell
Marty Lambert	Jone Allison; Andree Wallace
Brad Forbes	Frank Lovejoy
Whit Davis	House Jameson
Mr. Brink	Percy Hemus; G. Sayne Gordon
Mrs. Brink	Ethel Wilson
Phil Barnes	Carl Eastman

Source: Radio Programs, 1924-1984: A Catalog of More Than 1800 Shows except as noted.

Others heard regularly on the program were Ginger Jones, Myra McCormick, Margaret MacDonald and Paul Stewart. Ed Herlihy was the announcer. William Meader provided the music. The writer was Ruth Adams Knight.

== See also ==
- List of radio soap operas
- Radio drama
