= Wallis (given name) =

Wallis is a unisex given name of English and Scottish origin. Notable people with the given name include:

== Women ==
- Wallis Annenberg (1939-2025), American philanthropist and heiress
- Wallis Bird (born 1982), Irish singer
- Wallis Brooks, American politician
- Wallis Currie-Wood (born 1991), American actress
- Wallis Day (born 1994), English actress
- Wallis Giunta (born 1985), Canadian mezzo-soprano opera singer
- Wallis Grahn (1945–2018), Swedish actress
- Wallis Pang (born 1973), Chinese actress
- Wallis Randell (born 2001), Australian rules footballer
- Wallis Simpson (1896–1986), Duchess of Windsor
- Wallis Vitis (born 1995), French tennis player

== Men ==
- Wallis Clark (1882–1961), English actor
- Wallis Evershed (1863–1911), English cricketer
- Wallis Eastburn Howe (1868–1960), American architect
- Wallis Lapsley (born 1997), American soccer player
- Wallis Walter LeFeaux (1881–1972), American politician and lawyer
- Wallis Mathias (1935–1994), Pakistani athlete
- Wallis Thomas (1906–2001), Wales bishop
- Wallis Walters (1878–1952), English and Welsh hurdler and long jumper

== See also ==
- Wallace (given name)
- Wallis (surname)
- Wallis (disambiguation)
