= Ashley Whippet =

Whippet owned by Alex Stein of Ohio

- Breed: Whippet
- Sex: male
- Born: 1971
- Died: 1985 (aged 13–14)
- Known for: first notable disc dog
- Owner: Alex Stein
- Awards: Canine Frisbee Disc World Championships winner: 1975, 1976, 1977

Ashley Whippet (ca. 1971 – 1985), a Whippet owned by Alex Stein of Ohio, was the first notable disc dog and the winner of three Canine Frisbee Disc World Championships.

== Dodger Stadium ==
Ashley first gained notoriety on August 5, 1974, when Stein, then a 19-year-old college student, smuggled him into Dodger Stadium during a nationally televised Monday night baseball game between the Los Angeles Dodgers and the Cincinnati Reds. Stein jumped the fence and went onto the baseball field with Ashley, where he threw discs (Frisbees) for the dog to catch. The crowd was in awe at Ashley's disc-catching ability, as he ran up to 35 miles per hour and leaped 9 feet in the air to snag the Frisbees. The stunt was so novel that the game was stopped and Joe Garagiola continued to announce the flying disc action on the field. Finally, after eight minutes, Stein was escorted off the field and arrested. The nationally televised exhibition of Ashley's skill did much to fuel interest in the disc dog sport.

== Frisbee Dog World Championship ==
The next year, Stein helped to organize the first Frisbee Dog World Championship for flying-disc catching dogs and their handlers, which continued as an annual event. Stein and Ashley won the first three championships in 1975, 1976 and 1977. In those early years the Dog World Championship took place alongside the "human" Frisbee championships at the Rose Bowl in Pasadena, California. Eventually, it turned into a contest series and, in the early 1980s, was named the Ashley Whippet Invitational (AWI) in honor of Ashley.

== Floating Free ==
Ashley's skills as a disc dog were featured in the 1977 documentary entitled Floating Free, which was nominated for an Academy Award in the category of Best Live Action Short Film. The eleven-minute short was shot at the 1977 World Frisbee Championships and showcases the various events at the competition.

== Other notable performances ==
In 1977 Ashley performed at Super Bowl XI as the pre-game entertainment. He also performed at the White House for a young Amy Carter.

== Ashley's Ice Cream ==
Ashley's Ice Cream is a popular ice cream shop located on the Connecticut shoreline named after Ashley Whippet. From the beginning, when it opened in 1979 near Yale University, Ashley's celebrated the history of the Frisbee, which first gained popularity as a college craze on Yale's campus, where the students threw pie pans from the Frisbie Pie Company. Ashley's currently has 5 locations open, all of which are located in New Haven County. Their largest ice cream dish is served on a frisbee. It is called the Downside Watson. The Downside Watson is made with seven scoops of ice cream, nine toppings, and two bananas. Over the decades, many people have tried to consume an entire Downside Watson in one sitting, with the inevitable result that many people have stories about gastrointestinal distress caused by attempting to eat a Downside Watson. The shop has been voted Connecticut's best ice cream 14 years in a row. Ashley Whippet's favorite ice cream flavor from Ashley's Ice Cream was chocolate banana.

== See also ==
- List of individual dogs
