= Wallis =

Wallis (derived from Wallace) may refer to:

== People ==
- Wallis (given name)
  - Wallis, Duchess of Windsor
- Wallis (surname)

== Places ==
- Wallis (Ambleston), a hamlet within the parish of Ambleston in Pembrokeshire, West Wales, United Kingdom
- Wallis, Mississippi, an unincorporated community, United States
- Wallis, Texas, a city, United States
- Wallis and Futuna, a French overseas department
  - Wallis Island, one of the islands of Wallis and Futuna
- Valais, a Swiss canton with the German name "Wallis"
- Walliswil bei Niederbipp, a municipality in the Oberaargau administrative district, canton of Bern, Switzerland
- Walliswil bei Wangen, a municipality in the Oberaargau administrative district, canton of Bern, Switzerland

== Brands and enterprises ==
- Wallis (retailer), a British clothing retailer
- Wallis Theatres, an Australian cinema franchise

== See also ==
- Wallace (disambiguation) (original form)
