= Vallance =

Vallance is a surname, and may refer to:

- Aylmer Vallance (1892–1955), born George Alexander Gerald Vallance, was a Scottish newspaper editor
- Elizabeth Vallance (1945–2020), British philosopher, magistrate and policy maker
- Iain Vallance, Baron Vallance of Tummel (born 1943) Scottish businessman
- Jeffrey Vallance (born 1955), American artist
- Jim Vallance (born 1952), Canadian songwriter
- Sir Patrick Vallance (born 1960), British doctor and former Chief Scientific Adviser to the Government of the United Kingdom
- Louise Vallance (born 1958), Canadian actress and singer
- Thomas Vallance (1924–1980), English football player
- Thomas George Vallance (1928–1993), Australian geologist and historian of science
- Tom Vallance (1856–1935), Scottish international football player
- William Fleming Vallance (1827–1904), Scottish artist

== Groups ==
- Vallance F. C., a football club in Bethnal Green, London

== See also ==
- Valance (disambiguation)
- Valence (disambiguation)
