= Valance =

A Valance is a decorative apron used to conceal mechanical or structural framework for aesthetic purposes.

Valance may refer to:

== Furnishings ==
- Window valance, used above a window to conceal hardware or other window treatments
- Bed skirt, a piece of decorative fabric between the mattress and the box spring of a bed
- An apron or skirt for a countertop or trunk

== Vehicles ==
- Smoke deflectors on a steam locomotive
- Skirt installed on an automotive bumper

== People ==
- Valance Nambishi (born 1997), Zambian footballer
- Valance Connell (born 1944), Barbadian cricketer
- Glen Sabre Valance (1943–1964), Australian murderer
- Holly Valance (born 1983), Australian actress and singer
- Olympia Valance (born 1993), Australian actress and model
- Peter Valance (born 1980), German illusionist
- Ricky Valance (1936–2020), Welsh singer

== See also ==
- Valence (disambiguation)
- Vallance, a surname
