= Michael Wallace (piper) =

Irish piper (fl. late 1800s)

- Origin: Ireland
- Instrument: Pipes

Michael Wallace (fl. late 1800s), Irish piper.

Michael and his brother Frank Wallace (piper) were born somewhere between Ballina and Westport, County Mayo. He performed in England and New York City.

Michael's supporters claimed he was a better piper than William Connolly (born 1839). The pipemaker, Michael Egan, thought him the best Irish piper on either side of the Atlantic.

His ultimate fate is unknown.
