= Craig Mallace =

Scottish footballer

Personal information
- Date of birth: 13 February 1985 (age 41)
- Place of birth: Torphichen, Scotland
- Height: 1.85 m (6 ft 1 in)
- Positions: Defender; midfielder

Youth career
- 2003–2006: Milwaukee Panthers

Senior career*
Years	Team	Apps	(Gls)
2006–2009	Minnesota Thunder	38	(0)
- * Club domestic league appearances and goals

Craig Mallace (born 13 February 1985) is a Scottish former professional footballer and former Director of Camps & Youth Development for Minnesota United FC.

== Early and personal life ==
Born in Torphichen, Scotland, Mallace played college soccer in the United States with the Milwaukee Panthers.

His younger brother Calum is also a footballer.

== Career ==
=== Playing career ===
Mallace turned professional in 2006 when drafted by the Milwaukee Wave (MISL). He was then signed for the Minnesota Thunder making 38 appearances for the Minnesota Thunder of the USL First Division through May 2009 before retiring due to injury.

=== Coaching career ===
After retiring as a professional player, Mallace became a director of coaching for several clubs in Twin Cities area of Minnesota. He was Director of Coaching for European Soccer Academy in New Jersey. Upon returning to Minnesota, he was Director of Coaching for Cottage Grove United.

He was named Director of Camps & Youth Development for Minnesota United FC in February 2014, and was also the Assistant Coach for the Minnesota United Reserves. He currently runs his own youth training company and is the host on his weekly podcast.
