= Andree Wallace =

American actress

Andree Wallace is an American actress who has performed on radio, television, and stage.

== Early years ==
Wallace was born in Brooklyn "into an extraordinarily large family" of Scottish ancestry via both her Campbell mother and her Wallace father. Her father had been a shopkeeper in Scotland, and he became a gardener in a cemetery in Brooklyn. Her mother operated a rooming house in East Flatbush. She graduated from Girls' Commercial High School in Brooklyn, where she took a dramatics class.

== Career ==
Wallace first worked professionally in radio when she was 17 years old, obtaining a role on The Little Blue Playhouse for $10 per episode. By 1948, she had acted on radio and on stage in summer stock productions, in Blackfriar's productions, and in productions of the Equity Library Theatre On February 3, 1948, she debuted in the title role of Michael Sayers's Kathleen at the Mansfield Theatre on Broadway.

Wallace's roles on radio included Marty Lambert on Brave Tomorrow, Cynthia on The Romance of Helen Trent and Jane on Miss Hattie. She was a featured member of the stock company of Radio Reader's Digest. Other radio programs on which she was heard included Famous Jury Trials, Light of the World, My True Story, and Young Widder Brown. She also acted on Kraft Television Theatre.

== Personal life ==
Wallace married film publicist Guy Biondi, whom she met when she was studying drama and he was stage manager when her class presented a demonstration. They have two children.
