= Justice Wallace =

Justice Wallace may refer to:

- James P. Wallace (1928–2017), justice of the Texas Supreme Court
- John E. Wallace Jr. (born 1942), associate justice of the New Jersey Supreme Court
- Robert M. Wallace (judge) (1847–1914), justice of the New Hampshire Supreme Court
- William T. Wallace (1828–1909), chief justice of the Supreme Court of California

== See also ==
- Judge Wallace (disambiguation)
