= Wallace Building (Little Rock, Arkansas) =

- U.S. National Register of Historic Places
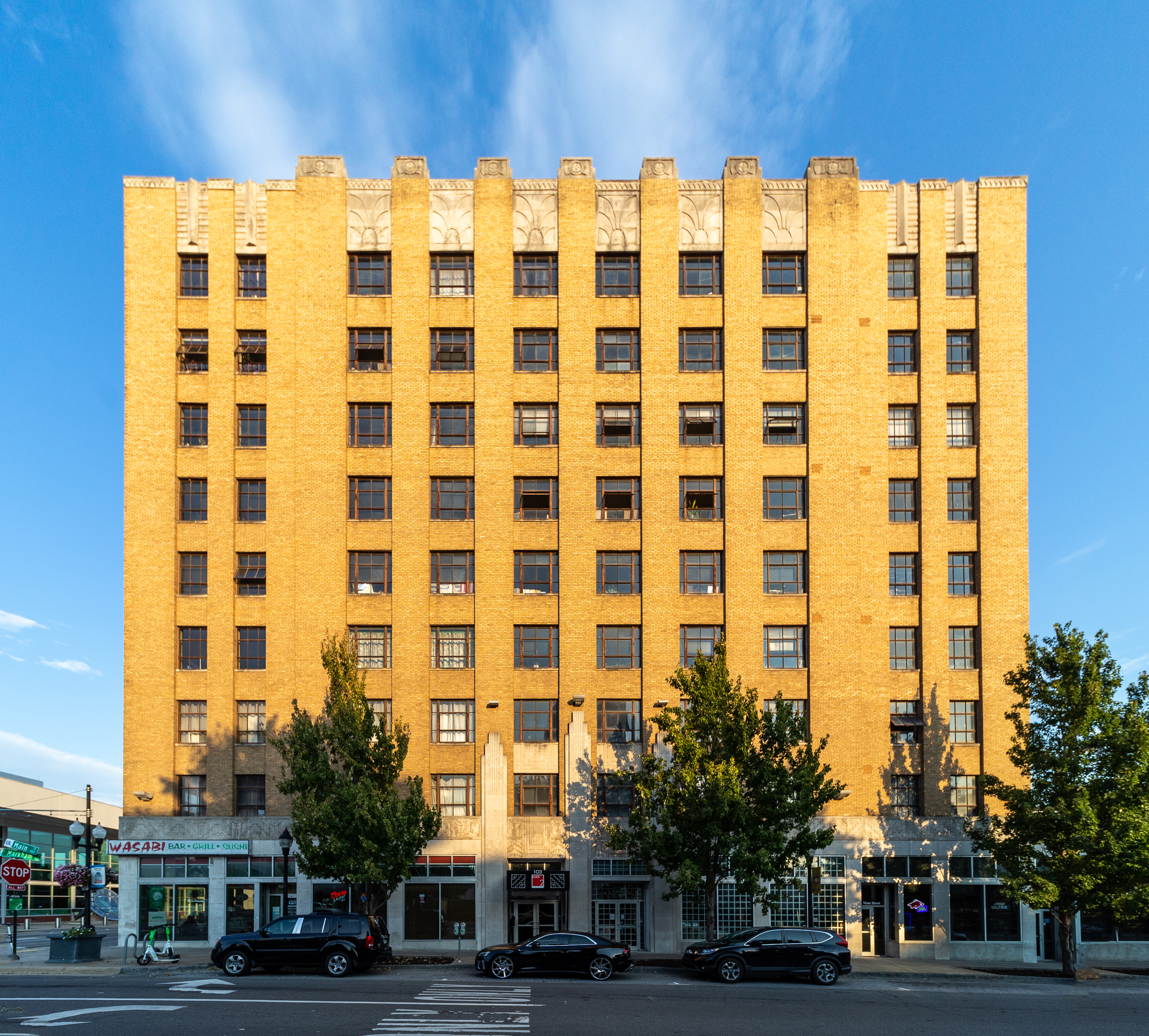

- Location within Arkansas Location within the United States
- Location: 101-111 Main St., Little Rock, Arkansas
- Coordinates: 34°44′52″N 92°16′12″W
- Area: less than one acre
- Built: 1928
- Built by: George Washington Donaghey
- Architect: Mann, Wanger & King
- Architectural style: Art Deco
- NRHP reference No.: 99000223
- Added to NRHP: February 18, 1999

The Wallace Building is a nine-story commercial high-rise at 101-11 Main Street in downtown Little Rock, Arkansas. It was built in 1928 to a design by Little Rock architect George R. Mann of the firm of Mann, Wanger & King, and is an excellent local example of early Art Deco architecture. It was built by George Washington Donaghey, a former Governor of Arkansas; Mann and Donaghey had previously worked together on the Arkansas State Capitol, with disputes over its construction propelling Donaghey into politics and the governor's seat. This building is named after his wife's maiden name.

The building was listed on the National Register of Historic Places in 1999.

== See also ==
- National Register of Historic Places listings in Little Rock, Arkansas
