= Wallace Oak (Torwood) =

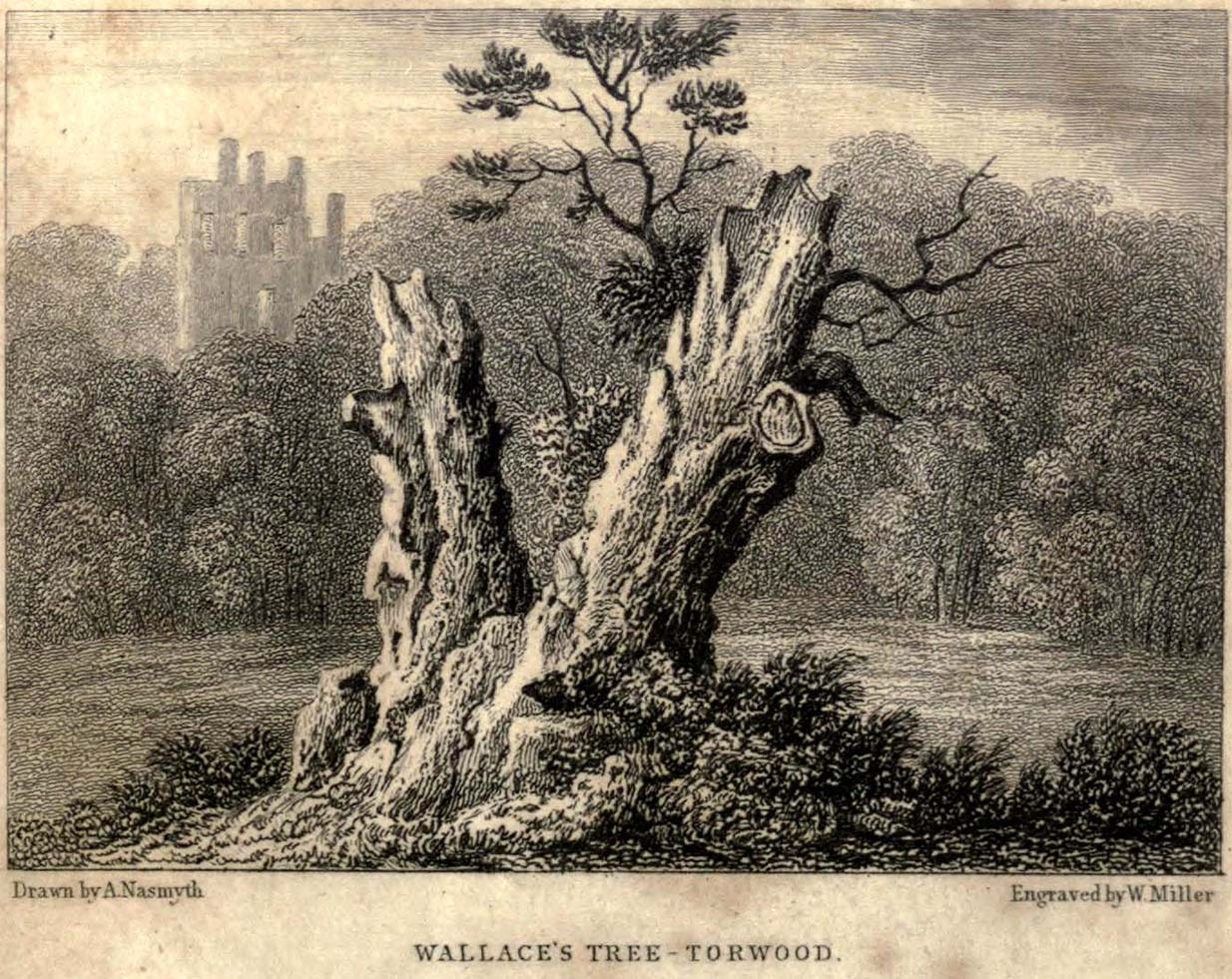
- Engraving of Alexander Nasmyth's 1771 drawing of the tree
- Location: Torwood, Scotland
- Date felled: before 1835

The Wallace Oak was a tree in Torwood, Scotland. it is thought to have been part of the Torwood ancient woodland and has been linked to pre-Christian druidic worship. The tree became associated with the Scottish independence leader William Wallace. Its hollow trunk is reputed to have served him as a headquarters, hiding place and sleeping quarters. By the 17th century the tree was being used to make souvenirs due to its association with Wallace. By 1830 it was described as badly affected by the removal of timber, being reduced to a single stump. Timber being scarce above ground its roots were also dug up for souvenirs and the tree was dead by 1835.

== Association with Wallace ==
The tree stood in the ancient forest of Torwood and is reputed to have been the focus of druidic worship in ancient times. The writer John Donald Carrick in the early 19th-century described the tree as having "greater antiquity" than any tree he had seen in Scotland. The tree stood on a raised platform in an area of clayey swamp land (known as carse in Scotland); the platform was originally 42 feet (13 m) in diameter but had decayed by the 1800s.

The tree is known as the "Wallace Oak", "Wallace's Tree" and "Wallace's Oak" for its association with 13th & 14th-century Scottish independence leader William Wallace. Wallace is said to have retreated to the Torwood after a defeat in the north of the country and hidden within its hollow trunk. The tree is then said to have become the headquarters of Wallace, who used the nearby wood to hide his troops, for a number of years. Wallace is said to have slept within the trunk of the tree which was large enough to accommodate him and several of his officers and addressed his men when they assembled beneath its canopy. The tree at this point is reputed to have been of great size, being described as the largest tree ever to have grown in Scotland and able to provide shade for a thousand men.

In the early 19th century an old spear point was found some 30 feet (9.1 m) west of the oak, at 1 foot (0.30 m) depth. The spear point was dated to 1488, when James III of Scotland fought rebel nobles in the Torwood, or possibly even earlier. Torwood Castle was built near the location of the Wallace Oak in the 16th century.

== Decline and loss ==
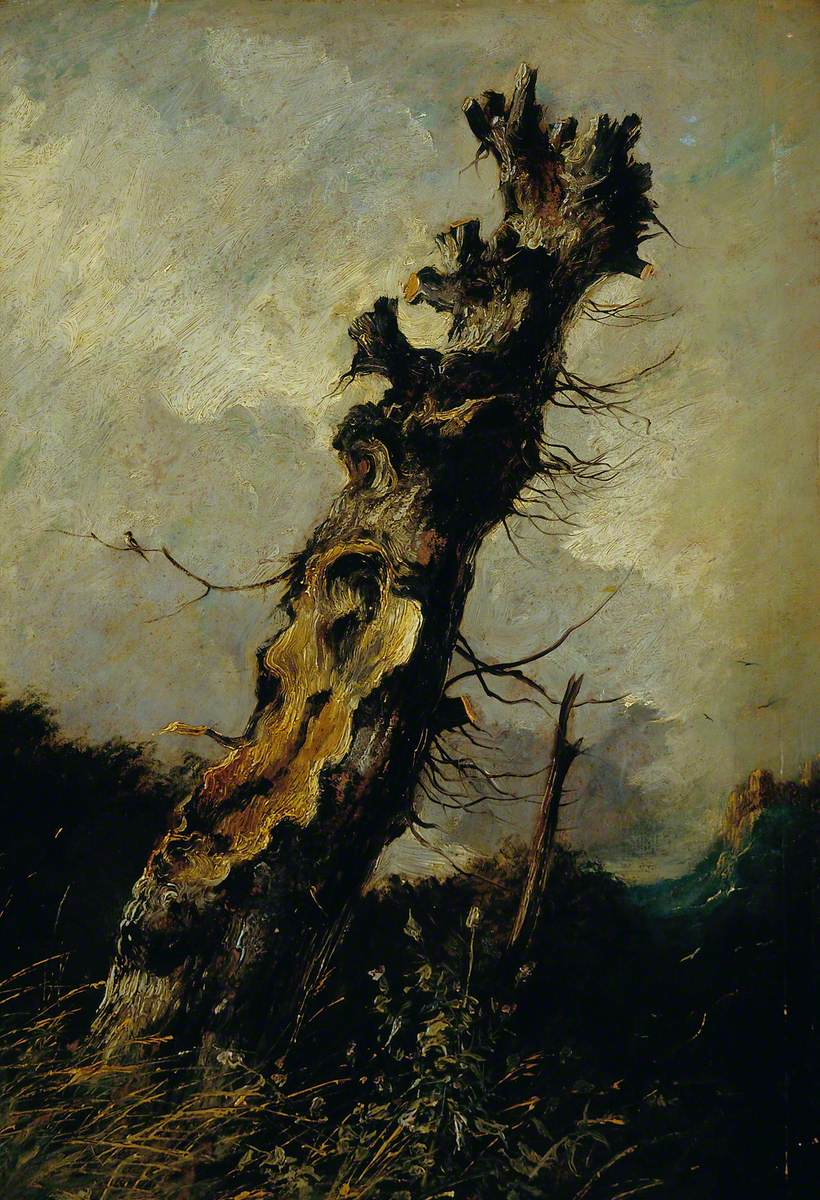
Blasted Oak by John Thomson

The tree has long been targeted by souvenir hunters. The earliest known such relic is a silver-rimmed quaich (drinking cup) of 1689; this came into the possession of Charles Cochrane-Baillie, 2nd Baron Lamington and was displayed at the Scottish Exhibition of National History, Art and Industry in 1911 but has since disappeared. In 1771 the trunk of the Wallace Oak was measured at 22 feet (6.7 m) in circumference. In the same year it was drawn by Alexander Nasmyth who described it as much depleted, being reduce to little more than two stumps.

David Erskine, 11th Earl of Buchan removed a section of wood from the Wallace Oak in 1782. He had this made into a snuff box that was presented to US president George Washington in 1791 as a token intended to demonstrate that American democratic practices had their roots in Wallace's actions. The oak itself was described as "wholly decayed and hollow" by 1791.

Another quaich was made from wood of the Wallace Oak in 1795. This carries the inscription: "This cup is part of the oak tree in the Torwood which was often an asylum to the immortal Wallace. Drink of this and mark the footsteps of a hero". This cup is property of the Surnateum cabinet of curiosities in Brussels The tree was painted by John Thomson of Duddingston in the early 1800s. By this time it was merely a single stump and the painting was entitled by Thomson as the Blasted Oak. A snuffbox was made from some of the remaining timber in 1822 and presented to King George IV.

In early 1830 it was described as still sanding standing on a raised platform in a mossy area of swampland, though badly affected by the removal of timber. The stump stood at just 20 feet (6.1 m) in height, though it had sprouted new growth towards the top of this section. There were no other trees nearby, these having been cleared, and the oak stood near to a corduroy road.

With the timber above ground growing in short supply the souvenir hunters turned to digging up the platform to get to the tree's roots. The tree was dead by 1835. By 1877 only a few fragments of the trunk remained, but were said to be soon to disappear as they were being gathered as souvenirs. By 1881 the site of the tree lay 0.25 miles (0.40 km) from the edge of the Torwood, which had been subject to tree felling and land clearance.
