= Hunterston Castle =

- West Kilbride, North Ayrshire, Scotland; UK
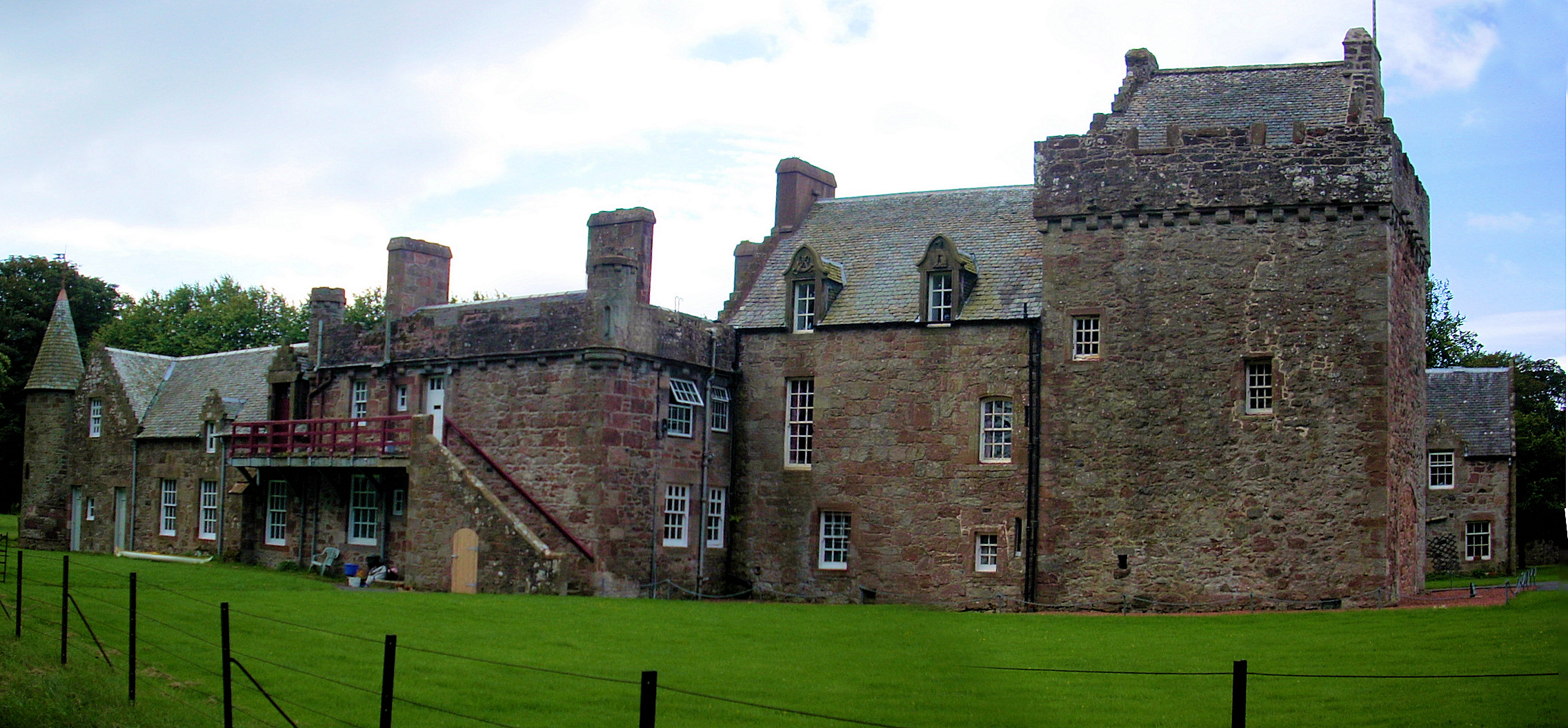
- The keep to the right with the later house to the left

Site information
- Type: Tower house
- Owner: Hunterston Estate
- Controlled by: Hunterston Estate
- Open to the public: Yes

Listed Building – Category A
- Designated: 14 April 1971
- Reference no.: LB14313
- Condition: Preserved

Location
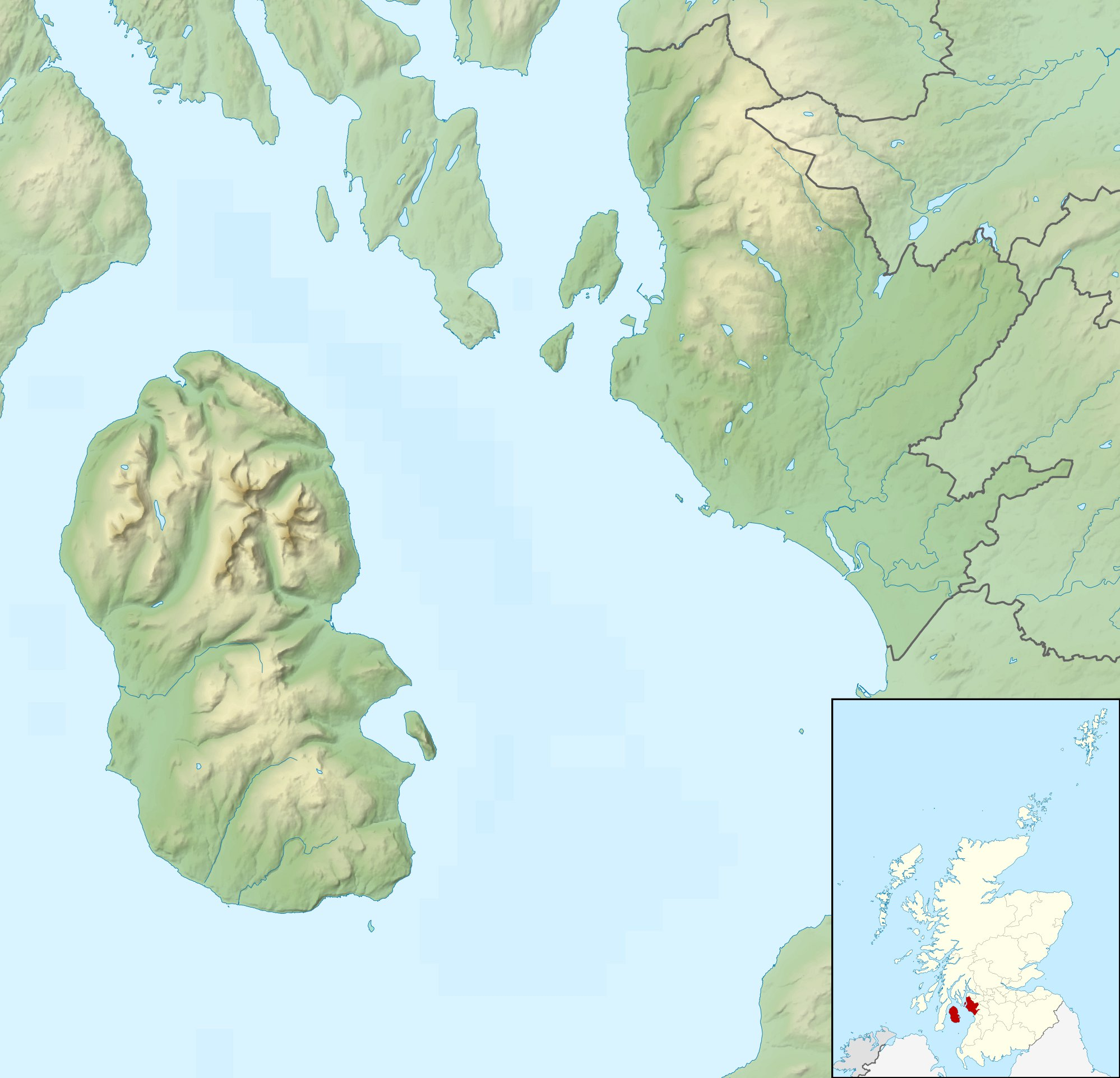
- Shown within Scotland
- Coordinates: 55.7229°N 4.8789°W
- Grid reference: grid reference NS192514
- Height: 34 metres

Site history
- Built: 1200 with additions added in 16th centuries onwards
- Built by: John Huntar (4th Laird)

Hunterston Castle, West Kilbride, North Ayrshire, Scotland is the historic home of the lairds of Hunterston and Chiefs of Clan Hunter. The keep dates from the late 12th, or early 13th centuries, while the attached manor house is of the 18th century. The estate was granted to the Hunters by David I of Scotland in the 12th century, and the heads of the clan have lived on the estate for the following 900 years. The castle is a Category A listed building.

== History ==
The original Hunters were Norman French in origin, who were granted the lands around Hunterston by King David I in the 12th century. In the Middle Ages, the chief of Clan Hunter was granted the hereditary title of Royal Huntsman. The family has owned the castle ever since, although much of the estate was compulsorily purchased by the government in the 20th century to enable the construction of the Hunterston A and Hunterston B nuclear power stations.

== Architecture and description ==
The tower dates from the late 12th, or early 13th, centuries, although earlier buildings existed nearby. In the 18th century, a house was added to the tower to provide additional accommodation. In the 19th century, this was considered insufficient and a Neoclassical house, Hunterston House, was built to the north of the castle. In 1926 Robert Lorimer undertook an extensive restoration of the castle. It is a Category A listed building.

== Public Access ==
Between 1974 and 1985 the castle was open to the general public. Due to new rules and legislation by the nearby nuclear power stations which felt that having too many people in the area would be a security risk and also impossible to evacuate them quickly in event of an emergency. After this the castle was accessible on a case by case advance request visit only until 1994 when the castle became off limits to the public and only Clan Hunter members were allowed to visit. In the 2000s the castle was open one day a year as part of the opendays event, however this still caused problems due to the vicinity of the power stations so it was dropped from future events and reverted to clan members only. The castle can still be viewed externally as it stands next to a public right of way and a sustrans cycle route.
