= Wallace County =

Wallace County may refer to:

- Wallace County, New South Wales, Australia
- Wallace County, Kansas, United States
- Wallace County, New Zealand
- Wallace counties are U.S. counties which historically voted for George Wallace in one or more of his unsuccessful attempts to reach the U.S. presidency.
