= William Fleming Vallance =

Scottish marine painter (1827-1904)

William Fleming Vallance (13 February 1827 – 30 August 1904) was a Scottish marine painter.

== Biography ==
Vallance was born at Paisley on 13 Feb. 1827, the youngest son in the family of six sons and one daughter of David Vallance, tobacco manufacturer, by his wife Margaret Warden. William, whose father died in William's childhood, was sent at a very early age to work in a weaver's shop; on the family's subsequent move to Edinburgh he was apprenticed in 1841 as a carver and gilder to Messrs. Aitken Dott. During his apprenticeship he began to paint, and made a little money by drawing chalk-portraits, but he was twenty-three before he received any proper instruction. He then worked for a short time in the Trustees' Academy under E. Dallas, and later, from 1855, studied under R. S. Lauder.

Vallance commenced to exhibit at the Royal Scottish Academy in 1849. On 2 January 1856 he married in Edinburgh Elizabeth Mackie, daughter of James Bell; they had two sons and six daughters. In 1857 Vallance took up art as a profession. His earlier work had been chiefly portraiture and genre. After 1870 he painted, principally in Wicklow, Connemara, and Galway, a series of pictures of Lish life and character, humorous in figure and incident, and fresh in landscape setting. But a year or two spent in Leith in childhood had left its impress on his mind, and it was as a painter of the sea and shipping that he was eventually best known. His first pictures of this kind hovered between the Dutch convention and the freer and higher pitched art of his own contemporaries and countrymen. Gradually the influence of the latter prevailed, and in such pictures as 'Reading the War News' (1871), 'The Busy Clyde' (1880), and 'Knocking on the Harbour Walls' (1884) he attained a certain charm of silvery lighting, painting with considerable, if somewhat flimsy, dexterity. Probably, however, his feeling for nature found its most vital expression in the water-colours, often in body-colour, which he painted out-of-doors. Vallance was elected associate of the Royal Scottish Academy in 1875, and became academician in 1881. In later years he was living in a large Georgian flat at 47 Great King Street in Edinburgh's Second New Town.

He died in Edinburgh on 30 August 1904. His widow had a chalk portrait of him as a young man by John Pettie, R.A.
