= Frisbee Dog World Championship =

Annual competition for dogs

The Frisbee Dog World Championship (also known as the Ashley Whippet Invitational World Championship and the Canine Frisbee Disc World Championship) is an annual competition for disc dogs.

== Origin ==
In 1975, Irv Lander, Alex Stein and Eldon McIntire first organized a World Championship for flying-disc (Frisbee) catching dogs and their handlers. The event continued annually. Stein and his disc dog, Ashley Whippet, won the first three championships in 1975, 1976 and 1977. McIntire was the owner of another disc dog named Hyper Hank. Lander worked for Wham-O, the maker of the Frisbee, which is a registered trademark of Wham-O. He was a promoter of the Junior Frisbee Disc Championships, an event for humans. In the early years the championship took place alongside the "human" Frisbee championships, sponsored by Wham-o, at the Rose Bowl in Pasadena, California. Eventually, it turned into a contest series and, in the early 1980s, was named the Ashley Whippet Invitational (AWI). The competition series included local and regional events where dog and handler pairs would qualify for the Ashley Whippet Invitational World Finals Championship. Until the mid-1990s there was only one organization for disc dog competitions. For many years the AWI World Finals was the only championship event.

== Qualification ==
The final event was contested as a one-day, "winner take all" type event. The early qualifying format included 4 to 6 regionals with the 1st and 2nd place teams each earning a trip to the World Finals Championship. It was a closed regional system, meaning that the dog and handler team had to live and compete in the geographical area of the regional qualifier competition. Anywhere from 8 to 16 teams would qualify, depending upon the format and number of regional qualifiers that year.

== Format ==
Early tournaments were "Throw and Fetch" contests. Some were judged on style points, others on distance, others on standing in a circling throwing out, and still others on throwing into a circle.

Peter Bloeme got involved with the disc dog sport in the early 1980s, after winning the 1976 Men's World Frisbee Championship and won a Frisbee Dog World Championship in 1984. He then "retired" from competition and began to work for AWI as a judge and event coordinator. Peter Bloeme pushed the sport in the direction of multiple disc "Freestyle" contests, which changed the disc dog game forever. Over time the World Finals Championship was modified to include a freestyle event (sometimes known as "Freeflight"), and a timed throw and catch event (known as "MiniDistance," and later as "Distance/Accuracy").

== Lander Cup ==
In the late 1980s a trophy cup was introduced by Peter Bloeme, Eldon McIntire, Jeff Perry, and Alex Stein to commemorate the yearly AWI World Champions. The large silver cup is mounted on a wooden base, which is covered with small plaques inscribed with names of the winners. It is called the "Lander Cup" in honor of Irv Lander, then the Executive Director of the AWI tournament series.

== Changes to the World Championship ==
Lander died in 1998 and left the AWI tournament series and the related business to his son, Steve Lander. Many involved in the disc dog sport and the AWI organization had expected Peter Bloeme, then director of the AWI series, to be Irv Lander's successor. That year was the first time the AWI World Finals Championship was filmed for TV. The event, sponsored by ALPO, was presented on Animal Planet as the ALPO Canine Frisbee Disc World Championship. Peter Bloeme was the "on screen" announcer for the event. After the 1998 World Finals, Bloeme left AWI and did not renew his contract.

=== Skyhoundz ===
In 2000, Skyhoundz staged its very first World Canine Disc Championship, sponsored by Hyperflite (www.hyperflite.com). The Hyperflite Skyhoundz World Canine Disc Championship Series (www.skyhoundz.com) is now the largest disc dog competition series in the world and features, each year, more than 100 free Local Championships held in the U.S. and other countries, as well as U.S. State Championships, nine U.S. World Championship Qualifiers, seven International World Championship Qualifiers, a European Championship, a World Championship, Xtreme Distance Challenge events, and DiscDogathon competitions. In 2011 the Hyperflite Skyhoundz Series will be expanded to include a week-long World Championship extravaganza that will include a World Canine Disc Championship in five Divisions (Open, Sport, Pairs Freestyle, MicroDog, and Youth) as well as an Xtreme Distance World Championship (and associated Last Chance Open Qualifier), and a DiscDogathon World Championship (and associated Last Chance Open Qualifier). Participants in the week-long Skyhoundz World Championship will have at least three opportunities at various Last Chance Open Qualifiers to qualify for the remaining invitations to compete for World Championship titles.

=== AWI ===
The AWI World Championship ceased in 2000, and there was no AWI World Championship in 2001 or 2002. The AWI reorganized in 2003 and once again began running a World Championship, without a supporting series. Previous AWI staff and judges Mark Molnar, Eldon McIntire, and Gary Suzuki were the leaders of this renewed event. The 2003 event was held in La Mirada, California and was an "all comer" meet (with no qualifier). The winner was invited to a special "Ashley Whippet Championship" event that took place in Japan later the same year. The newly reformed AWI Championships event was held again in La Mirada in 2004. In 2005, the same group of organizers took their event to Scottsdale Arizona, In 2006 the AWI World Championship event was run by another disc dog competition organization, the UFO. The UFO ran the Ashley Whippet Invitational World Championship as the final event of its season. Competitors qualified for the UFO Finals - AWI World Championships by earning points in the UFO World Cup Series or by finishing in the top 15 at a semi-final event.

In 2007, the UFO ran its own Final event, in Dallas, Texas. The AWI World Championships returned to Scottsdale, this time with Hero Disc running the event. The event in 2007 featured a qualifier in Naperville, Illinois on September 1. The top 25 teams qualified for the final event. There was a second qualifier held in Scottsdale on Friday November 2. The top 25 teams from this qualifier joined the qualifiers from Illinois and Japan.

In 2008, Hero Disc moved the AWI World Championship to La Mirada California, with the final day of the event being held at Knott's Berry Farms in Buena Park, California. The event was once again supported by 2 USA qualifying events-Naperville, Illinois and the Friday qualifier at the finals event. A qualifying event in Japan supplied several Japanese teams as well.

In 2009, the AWI World Championships was moved to Naperville, Illinois, where it was held on Labor Day weekend in conjunction with a UFO Major. The event was held without any qualifying events, and was once again an "all comer" meet.

== List of World Champions ==
The following teams of dog and owner (handler) have been awarded the Lander Cup.

Year	Owner/Handler	Dog	Breed
1975	Alex Stein	Ashley Whippet	Whippet
1976	Alex Stein	Ashley Whippet	Whippet
1977	Alex Stein	Ashley Whippet	Whippet
1978	Jim Strickler	Dink	mixed
1979	Jim Strickler	Dink	mixed
1980	Frank Allen	Kona	Vizsla
1981	Bob Cox	Belmond	Labrador Retriever
1982	Bill Murphy	Bouncin' Boo	mixed
1983	Bill Murphy	Bouncin' Boo	mixed
1984	Peter Bloeme	Whirlin' Wizard	Border Collie
1985	Bill Murphy	Bouncin' Boo	mixed
1986	Chris Barbo	Kato	mixed
1987	Jeff Gabel	Casey	Labrador Retriever
1988	Jeff Gabel	Casey	Labrador Retriever
1989	Jeff Perry	Gilbert	mixed
1990	Lou McCammon	Scooter	Australian Shepherd
1991	Ron Ellis	Maggy	Border Collie
1992	Lou McCammon	Scooter	Australian Shepherd
1993	Gary Suzuki	Soarin' Sam	mixed
1994	Gary Suzuki	Soarin' Sam	mixed
1995	Gary Suzuki	Soarin' Sam	mixed
1996	Pon Saradeth	Owen Boy	Border Collie
1997	Melissa Heeter	Ariel Asah	Border Collie
1998	Bob Evans	Luke	Australian Shepherd
1999	Ken Cooper	Gabby	Border Collie
2000	Bob Evans	Nick	Australian Shepherd
2003	Bob Evans	Nick	Australian Shepherd
2004	Bob Evans	Nick	Australian Shepherd
2005	Steve Malmlov	Foster	mixed
2006	Yoshihiro Ishida	Rusty	Border Collie
2007	Yoshihiro Ishida	Rusty	Border Collie
2008	Lawrence Frederick	Harley Davidson	Border Collie
2009	Todd Murnan	Bella	Belgian Malinois
2010	Lawrence Frederick	Harley Davidson	Border Collie
2011	Chuck Middleton	Bling Bling	mixed
2012	Chuck Middleton	Bling Bling	mixed
2013	Chuck Middleton	Bling Bling	mixed
2014	Andrew Han	Solar	Australian Shepherd
2015	Kirby McIlveen	Torch	McNab
2016	Tracy Custer	Ninja	mixed
2017	Kirby McIlveen	Torch	McNab
2018	Andrea Rigler	Leap	mixed
2019	Kosuke Hirai	Greedy	Border Collie
2021	Jeff Hill	Zin	Australian Shepherd
2022	Yachi Hirai	Woof	mixed
2023	Yachi Hirai	Woof	mixed
2024	Kirby McIlveen	Sora	Border Collie

Skyhoundz World Champions Open Division (Freestyle/Distance/Accuracy Combined)
00 Nick (Australian Shepherd), trainer Bob Evans, Dallas, TX
01 Chico (Border Collie), trainer David Bootes, Ketchum, ID
02 Donnie (Mix), trainer Chuck Middleton, Dallas, TX
03 Cory (Australian Shepherd), trainer Jeff Stanaway, Gloucester, VA
04 Nick (Australian Shepherd), trainer Bob Evans, Dallas, TX
05 Rory (Australian Shepherd), trainer Tony Hoard, New Castle, IN
06 Guinan (Border Collie), trainer Danny Eggleston, Osceola, IN
07 Jumpin' Jack (Border Collie), trainer Danny Venegas, West Palm Beach, FL
08 Rory (Australian Shepherd), trainer Tony Hoard, New Castle, IN
09 Gipper (Border Collie), trainer Mark Muir, Williamson, GA
10 Flash (Border Collie), trainer Lawrence Frederick, Jacksonville, FL
11 Torch (McNab), trainer Kirby McIlveen, Huntington Beach, CA
12 Psych (Border Collie), trainer Pennie Mahon, Cypress, TX
13 Flower (Border Collie), trainer Matteo Gaddoni, Forli, Italy
14 Zorra (Border Collie), trainer Lawrence Frederick, Jacksonville, FL
15 Chill (Cattle Dog), trainer Tracy Custer, Grey Summit, MO
16 The Kai Bear (Australian Shepherd), trainer Jason Rigler, Jupiter, FL
17 Jazmin (Australian Shepherd), trainer Troy Mool, Oak Ridge, MO
18 Riley (Mix), trainer Mark Faragoi, Plainfield, IL
19 Torch (McNab), trainer Kirby McIlveen, Placentia, CA
21 Leap (Mix), trainer Andrea Rigler, Sanford, NC
22 Muse (Australian Shepherd), trainer Jeff Hill, Anaheim, CA
23 Vamos (mix), trainer Autumn Trainor, Monroe, GA
24 Salsa (mix), trainer Matt Bilderback, Delaware, OH

MicroDog Division (Freestyle/Distance/Accuracy Combined)
04 K-2 (Mix), trainer Todd Duncan, Cumming, GA
05 Scout (Mix), trainer Mare Potts, Aurora, IL
06 Seven (Australian Shepherd), trainer Tony Hoard, New Castle, IN
07 Tallulah (Mix), trainer Katherine Ferger, Queensville, Ontario, Canada
08 George (Rat Terrier), trainer Al Erikson, San Diego, CA
09 George (Rat Terrier), trainer Al Erikson, San Diego, CA
10 Gracie (Australian Shepherd), trainer Lee Fairchild, Goldsby, OK
11 George (Rat Terrier), trainer Al Erikson, San Diego, CA
12 Gracie (Australian Shepherd), trainer Lee Fairchild, Goldsby, OK
13 Bella (Australian Shepherd), trainer Matt Bilderback, Columbus, OH
14 Auggie (Parson Russell Terrier), trainer Timothy Geib, Atlanta, GA
15 Auggie (Parson Russell Terrier), trainer Timothy Geib, Atlanta, GA
16 Auggie (Parson Russell Terrier), trainer Timothy Geib, Atlanta, GA
17 Glamour (Border Collie), trainer Dean Wertz, Dracula, GA
18 Key (Australian Shepherd), trainer Jeff Hill, Anaheim, CA
19 Glamour (Border Collie), trainer Dean Wertz, Dracula, GA
21 Bonbon (Mini Australian Shepherd), trainer Jeff Hill, Anaheim, CA
22 Flare (Mix), trainer Kirby McIlveen, Placenta, CA
23 Bonbon (Mini Australian Shepherd), trainer Jeff Hill, Anaheim, CA
24 Bonbon (Mini Australian Shepherd), trainer Jeff Hill, Anaheim, CA

Sport Division (Distance/Accuracy)
02 Donnie (Mix), trainer Chuck Middleton, Dallas, TX
03 Passer (Border Collie), trainer Sayuri Norose, Japan
04 Bowditch (Border Collie), trainer Larry Beatty, Portsmouth, VA
05 Blade (Mix), trainer Adrian Custer, Milford, OH
06 Beamer (Australian Cattle Dog), trainer John Bilheimer, Glen Burnie, MD
07 Brigit (Border Collie), trainer Robert Walkley, Tampa, FL
08 Brook (Border Collie), trainer Kevin Eroskey, Kennesaw, GA
09 Gipper (Border Collie), trainer Mark Muir, Williamson, GA
10 BamBam (Australian Shepherd), trainer Chuck Middleton, Dallas, TX
11 Hippie Chick (Australian Shepherd), trainer David Gosch, Baltimore, MD
12 Seesco (Border Collie), trainer Jozsef Zsiros, Hungary
13 Bangwool(Border Collie), trainer Sang-Jun Han, South Korea
14 Merlin (Border Collie), trainer Kevin Eroskey, Kennesaw, Georgia
15 Muse (Australian Shepherd), trainer Kirby McIlveen, Placentia, CA
16 Ninja (Mix), trainer Tracy Custer, Villa Ridge, MO
17 Rodeo (Labrador), trainer Scott Jones, Davison, MI
18 Chica (Mix), trainer Chuck Middleton, Dallas, TX
19 Sora (Border Collie), trainer Kirby McIlveen, Placentia, CA
21 Sora (Border Collie), trainer Kirby McIlveen, Placentia, CA
22 Zoom (Border Collie), trainer Jason Rigler, Baxter, TX
23 Tug (Border Collie), trainer Blake Kilbourne, Carrollton, GA
24 Zin (Australian Shepherd), trainer Jeff Hill, Anaheim, CA

MicroDog Sport Division (Distance/Accuracy)
16 Siri (Border Collie), trainer Dean Wertz, Dracula, GA
17 Glamour (Border Collie), trainer Dean Wertz, Dracula, GA
18 Canyon (Mix), trainer Chuck Middleton, Dallas, TX
19 Denali (Australian Shepherd), trainer Scott Jones, Davison, MI
21 Bonbon (Mini Australian Shepherd), trainer Jeff Hill, Anaheim, CA
22 Bonbon (Mini Australian Shepherd), trainer Jeff Hill, Anaheim, CA
23 Mamba (Australian Koolie), trainer Lily Martinez, Fernandina Beach, FL
24 Mamba (Australian Koolie), trainer Lily Martinez, Fernandina Beach, FL

Pairs Freestyle (Freestyle)
05 Shiloh (Mix), Frank Buckland, Pasadena, MD/Shannon Mosca Bilheimer, Glen Burnie, MD
06 Shiloh (Mix), Frank Buckland, Pasadena, MD/Shannon Mosca Bilheimer, Glen Burnie, MD
07 Shiloh (Mix), Frank Buckland, Pasadena, MD/Shannon Mosca Bilheimer, Glen Burnie, MD
08 Shiloh (Mix), Frank Buckland, Pasadena, MD/Shannon Mosca Bilheimer, Glen Burnie, MD
09 Rally (Pyrenean Shepherd), Rick Rauwerda/Angela Ewtushik, Harriston, Ontario, Canada
10 Shiloh (Mix), Frank Buckland, Pasadena, MD/Sally Zinkham, Phoenix, MD
11 Shiloh (Mix), Frank Buckland, Pasadena, MD/Sally Zinkham, Phoenix, MD
12 Spencer (Mix), Jim Thomas, Jacksonville, FL/Michelle Thomas, Jacksonville, FL
13 Indigo (Mix), Scot Koster, Palm Coast, FL, Angel Koster, Palm Coast, FL
14 Cody (Mix), Sayaka Hagiwara, Japan, Hana Shiba, Japan
15 Muse (Australian Shepherd), Jeff Hill, Anaheim, CA, Kirby McIlveen, Placentia, CA
16 Bulma (Mix), Cosma Catalfamo, Italy, Antonio Rappazzo, Italy
17 Bulma (Mix), Cosma Catalfamo, Italy, Antonio Rappazzo, Italy
18 Bulma (Mix), Cosma Catalfamo, Italy, Antonio Rappazzo, Italy
19 Muse (Australian Shepherd), Jeff Hill, Anaheim, CA, Kirby McIlveen, Placentia, CA
21 Muse (Australian Shepherd), Jeff Hill, Anaheim, CA, Kirby McIlveen, Placentia, CA
22 Zunika (Border Collie), Eva Gutierrez, Rancho Palos Verdes, CA, Robert Gutierrez, Rancho Palos Verdes, CA
23 Sora (Australian Shepherd), Jeff Hill, Anaheim, CA, Kirby McIlveen, Placentia, CA
24 Bombay (Australian Shepherd), John Casey, Labadie, MO, Nikki Penta, Labadie MO

Youth Division (Freestyle/Distance/Accuracy Combined)
10 Hazel (Border Collie), trainer Scott Avick, Cutler Bay, Florida
11 Elsee (McNab), trainer LylaClare Kosobucki, Riverside, California
12 Cir-El (Australian Shepherd), trainer Courtney Williams, Barnesville, MD
13 Cir-El (Australian Shepherd), trainer Courtney Williams, Barnesville, MD
14 Perseus (Border Collie), trainer Melanie Redinger, Littleton, CO
15 Leo (Mix), trainer Allison Passejna, Clarkston, MI
16 Ben (Border Collie), trainer Kibaek Lim, Ansansi, South Korea
17 Paisley (Australian Shepherd), trainer Sidney Ryan, Gahanna, OH
18 Paisley (Australian Shepherd), trainer Sidney Ryan, Gahanna, OH
19 Lolly (Border Collie), trainer Angelica Rossi, Framura, Italy
21 RJ (Mix), trainer Kiera Hensley, Lakeland, FL
22 Darci Lynn (Australian Shepherd), trainer Jaden Gibson, Mechanicsville, MD
23 Sol (Border Collie), trainer Finley Shryock Taylor, Sturbridge, MA
24 Fiddle (Border Collie), trainer Finley Shryock Taylor, Sturbridge, MA

UFO World Cup Champions
Overall/Combined World Cup Series Champions
01 Nick (Australian Shepherd), trainer Bob Evans, Dallas, TX
02 Nick (Australian Shepherd), trainer Bob Evans, Dallas, TX
03 Levi (Mixed Breed), trainer Todd Duncan, Atlanta, GA
04 Ben (Mixed Breed), trainer Karin Actun, Dusseldorf, Germany
05 Levi (Mixed Breed), trainer Todd Duncan, Atlanta, GA
06 Maggie (Border Collie), trainer Matt DiAno, Littleton, CO
07 Maggie (Border Collie), trainer Matt DiAno, Littleton, CO
08 Maggie (Border Collie), trainer Matt DiAno, Littleton, CO
09 Guinan (Border Collie), trainer Danny Eggleston, Osceola, IN
10 Maggie (Border Collie), trainer Matt DiAno, Littleton, CO
11 Maggey (Border Collie), trainer Mike Hanson, Littleton, CO
12 Bling Bling (Mix), trainer Chuck Middleton, Dallas, TX
13 Torch (McNab), trainer Kirby McIlveen, Huntington Beach, CA
14 Flower (Border Collie), trainer Matteo Gaddoni, Forli, Italy
15 Torch (McNab), trainer Kirby McIlveen, Placentia, CA
16 Rory (mix), trainer Adrian Stoica, Italy
17 Torch (McNab), trainer Kirby McIlveen, Placentia, CA
18 Torch (McNab), trainer Kirby McIlveen, Placentia, CA
19 Sora (Border Collie), trainer Kirby McIlveen, Placentia, CA
21 Sora (Border Collie), trainer Kirby McIlveen, Placentia, CA
22 Inu (Border Collie), trainer Adrian Stoica, Italy
23 Sora (Border Collie), trainer Kirby McIlveen, Placentia, CA
24 Oreo (Border Collie), trainer Marina Fangareggi, Italy

Freestyle World Cup Series Champions
07 Tucker (Australian Shepherd), trainer Paul West, Dallas, TX
08 Guinan (Border Collie), trainer Danny Eggleston, Osceola, IN
09 Guinan (Border Collie), trainer Danny Eggleston, Osceola, IN
10 Bayer (Australian Shepherd), trainer Gary Duke
11 Bam Bam (Australian Shepherd), trainer Chuck Middleton, Dallas, TX
12 Moxie (Mix), trainer Andrea Rigler, Jupiter, FL
13 Moxie (Mix), trainer Andrea Rigler, Jupiter, FL
14 Baily (?), trainer Melanie Fydrich, Germany
15 Solar (Australian Shepherd), trainer Andrew Han, Milwaukee, WI
16 Bill (Border Collie), trainer Matteo Gaddoni, Forli, Italy
17 Torch (McNab), trainer Kirby McIlveen, Placentia, CA
18 Torch (McNab), trainer Kirby McIlveen, Placentia, CA
19 Sora (Border Collie), trainer Kirby McIlveen, Placentia, CA
21 Sora (Border Collie), trainer Kirby McIlveen, Placentia, CA
22 Inu (Border Collie), trainer Adrian Stoica, Italy
23 Goldrush (Mix), trainer Shaun Hirai, Japan
24 Minai (Border Collie), trainer Julia Zimmerman, Germany

Throw and Catch World Cup Series Champions
07 Sprite (?), trainer Paul West, Dallas, TX
08 Skye (Border Collie), trainer Preston Dean, Athens, GA
09 Bolero (Labrador), trainer Scott Jones, Davison, MI
10 Maggie (Border Collie), trainer Matt DiAno, Littleton, CO
11 Maggie (Border Collie), trainer Matt DiAno, Littleton, CO
12 Rodeo (Labrador), trainer Scott Jones, Davison, MI
13 Maggey (Border Collie), trainer Mike Hanson, Littleton, CO
14 Rory (mix), trainer Adrian Stoica, Italy
15 Courage (Australian Cattle Dog), trainer Tracy Custer, Villa Ridge, MO
16 Zain (?), trainer David Roman, Spain
17 Muse (Australian Shepherd), trainer Jeff Hill, Anaheim, CA
18 Nove (Whippet), trainer Evanghelos Christofellis, Greece
19 Sora (Border Collie), trainer Kirby McIlveen, Placentia, CA
21 Split (Border Collie), trainer Tracy Custer, Gray Summit, MO
22 Minai (Border Collie), trainer Julia Zimmerman, Germany
23 Chica (mix), trainer Chuck Middleton, Dallas, TX
24 Mia (Border Collie), trainer Juanjo Pascual, Spain

Small Dog World Cup Series Champions
17 Key (Australian Shepherd), trainer Jeff Hill, Anaheim, CA
18 Key (Australian Shepherd), trainer Jeff Hill, Anaheim, CA
19 Icaro (Parson Russell Terrier), trainer Adrian Stoica, Italy
21 Icaro (Parson Russell Terrier), trainer Adrian Stoica, Italy
23 Vivien (?), trainer Lilia Steiner
