= Carleton Lyman Wallace =

American lawyer and politician

Carleton Lyman Wallace (June 6, 1866 – January 13, 1919) was an American lawyer and politician. He served in the Minnesota House of Representatives from 1899 to 1903, in 1905 and 1906, and in 1909 and 1910; Wallace then served in the Minnesota Senate from 1911 until his death in 1919. He was a Republican.

Wallace was born in Saratoga Springs, Saratoga County, New York. He received his law degree from the University of Minnesota Law School in 1897 and was admitted to the Minnesota bar. Wallace lived in Minneapolis, Minnesota, with his wife and family and practiced law in Minneapolis.
