= The Wallace =

The Wallace may refer to:-

- Sir William Wallace, the Scottish resistance leader.
- Who fought for freedom of Scottish people's against England.
- The Actes and Deidis of the Illustre and Vallyeant Campioun Schir William Wallace, an epic poem about the life of William Wallace by the Scottish writer Blind Harry
- The Wallace, a historical novel about the life of William Wallace by Nigel Tranter
