= Clan Hunter =

Scottish clan

- Clann an t-Sealgair (clan), Mac an t-Sealgair (surname)
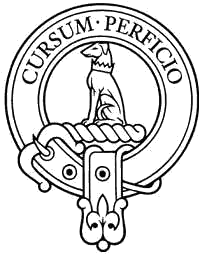
- Crest: A greyhound sejant Proper, gorged with an antique crown
- Motto: Cursum perficio (Latin) - I have completed the course
- War cry: Haud at Hunds o Hunterston

Profile
- Region: Scottish Highlands and Scottish Lowlands
- District: Ayrshire, Isle of Arran, The Cumbraes
- Plant badge: Sea Pink, Armeria Maritima
- Animal: Braque Dupuy
- Pipe music: Hunters March

Chief
- Pauline Natalie Hunter of Hunterston,
- Chief of the Name and Arms of Hunter and 30th Laird of Hunterston.Praefectus Venatorus Regis.
- Seat: Hunterston
- Historic seat: Hunterston Castle
- Last Chief: Neil Aylmer Hunter of Hunterston
- Died: 14 October 1994
Clan branches
- Hunter, or Orby Hunter, of Croyland Abbey, county Lincoln
- Hunter of Restinet, county Forfar
- Hunter of Long-Calderwood, county Lanark
- Hunter of Kirkland. county Ayr
- Hunter of Abbotshill, county Ayr, now of Barjarg, county Dumfries
- Hunter of Thurston Manor, county Haddington
- Hunter of Doonholm, county Ayr
- Hunter-Blair (Baronet) of Blairquhan

Hunter of Hunterston Tartan
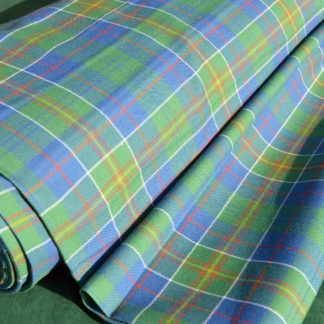
- The Hunter of Hunterston tartan in colors.

Sett
- Tartan thread count: G10 B4 G28 B28 R4 B28 W4 G28 R4 G8 Y6

Tartan registries
- SRT entry: Hunter of Hunterston

Clan Hunter is a Scottish clan.

== History ==
=== Origins of the clan ===
It is likely that the Hunters went to Scotland with David I of Scotland upon his invitation and were given lands named Hunter's Toune.

In 1296 Aylmer le Hunter of the county of Ayr appears on the Ragman Rolls submitting to Edward I of England.

A charter signed by Robert II of Scotland on 2 May 1374 has survived that confirmed a grant of land to William Hunter for his faithful service rendered and to be rendered to us in return for a silver penny payable to the Sovereign at Hunterston on the Feast of Pentecost. To this day the Laird of Hunterston, chief of Clan Hunter keeps silver pennies, minted in the reigns of Robert II and George V in case of a royal visit on the day appointed for payment of her rent. The William Hunter who received this charter is reckoned to have been the tenth Hunter of Hunterston. In earlier records both William Hunter and Norman Hunter appear using the Latin form of the name, Venator.

=== 15th and 16th centuries ===
The Hunters were hereditary keepers of the royal forests of Arran and Little Cumbrae by the fifteenth century. The family appear to have held this office from an early date and also claim a long descent from people who held similar offices in England and Normandy before they came to Scotland. Andrew Hunter, Abbot of Melrose, was one of the most publicly-prominent members of the family during the Middle Ages. He served as Lord High Treasurer of Scotland under James II, 1443-1450, and held residence at Mauchline Castle, Ayrshire (known colloquially as 'Abbot Hunter's Tower'), where the heraldic arms of the family remain embossed on the vaulting of the hall.

During the sixteenth century the Hunters rendered chiefly military service. John Hunter, the fourteenth Laird was killed with his king at the Battle of Flodden in 1513. His son was Robert who was trouble with sickness and infirmity and was excused from military service in 1542 by James V of Scotland, providing that he sent his eldest son in his place. His son was Mungo who was killed at the Battle of Pinkie Cleugh in 1547.

=== 17th century ===
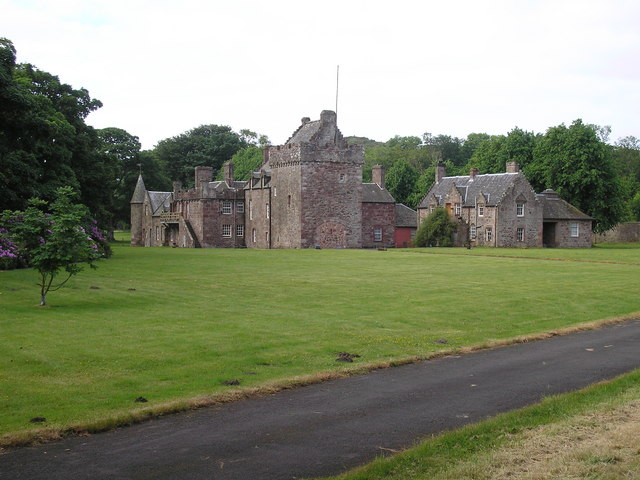
Hunterston Castle, historic seat of the chiefs of Clan Hunter

Successive generations of Hunters were more peaceful Lairds and tended to their estates and looked after their tenants. Younger sons and junior branches of the house of Hunterstoun entered the church and the professions. Robert Hunter who was a son of the twentieth Laird graduated at the University of Glasgow in 1643 and was minister of West Kilbride. He bought lands and founded the Hunters of Kirkland branch of the clan. William Hunter, son of Robert Hunter, provost of Ayr, was an Episcopalian clergyman and Jacobite, who witnessed the proclamation issued by James, the Old Pretender during the rebellion of 1715 and was ejected as a result from his ministry at Banff.

A grandson of the twentieth Laird was another Robert Hunter who served under Marlborough and was Governor of Virginia and later Governor of New York.. Hunter was among the outstanding colonial governors of the period. He was a scholar, poet, and Fellow of the Royal Society, and wrote 'Androboros': a satirical play aimed at his political opponents, which is believed to be first work of theatre publicly performed in New York.

=== 18th and 19th centuries ===
The family suffered from financial problems in the early eighteenth century. These problems were resolved by yet another Robert Hunter, a younger son of the twenty second Laird who succeeded to the estate and managed it well. He was succeeded by his daughter, Eleanora, who married her cousin, Robert Caldwell. He assumed the name Hunter and together they improved the estate and built the present Hunterston House. Their son had two daughters: Jane Hunter who married Gould Weston and Eleanor who married Robert William Cochran-Patrick.

=== 20th century ===
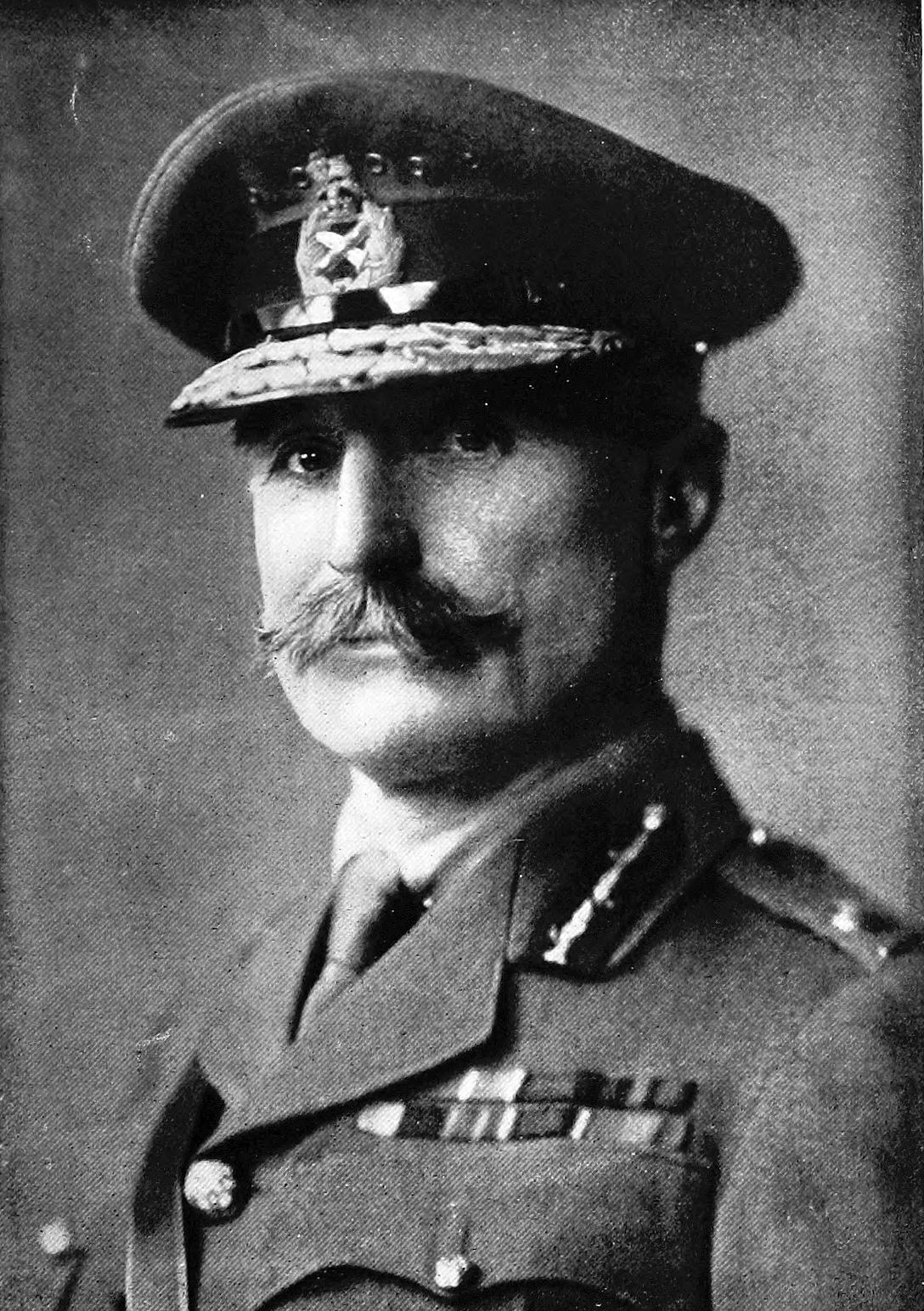
Sir Aylmer Hunter-Weston

Jane Hunter-Weston died in 1911 and was succeeded by her son, Lieutenant General Sir Aylmer Hunter-Weston who served on Kitchener's staff during the Egyptian War of 1896. He also served in the Boer Wars and also as a divisional officer of the British Expeditionary Force in World War I. Also during that war he served during the Gallipoli landings and later commanded the 8th Army on the Western Front.

== Post clan activity ==
As times became more settled the Hunters devoted more time to farming their extensive lands, although they still produced soldiers of distinction over the generations. Gould Hunter-Weston, husband of Jane Hunter-Weston (26th Laird) fought in India at Lucknow in 1857 and their eldest son, Aylmer (27th Laird) was a well-known general in the First World War. He later became Member of Parliament for North Ayrshire. During her tenure as Clan Chief, Eleanora (28th Laird) fought in the courts, but lost, a compulsory purchase order for land at Hunterston to build a nuclear power station.

The last Clan Chief, Neil Hunter of Hunterston and of that Ilk, along with his wife Sonia, Madam Hunter of Hunterston, continued the fight against industrialization. He was well known for his sailing prowess and represented the United Kingdom in two Olympic Games, winning a silver medal at Melbourne in 1956. Like many Hunters before him he was in true tradition an expert in archery.

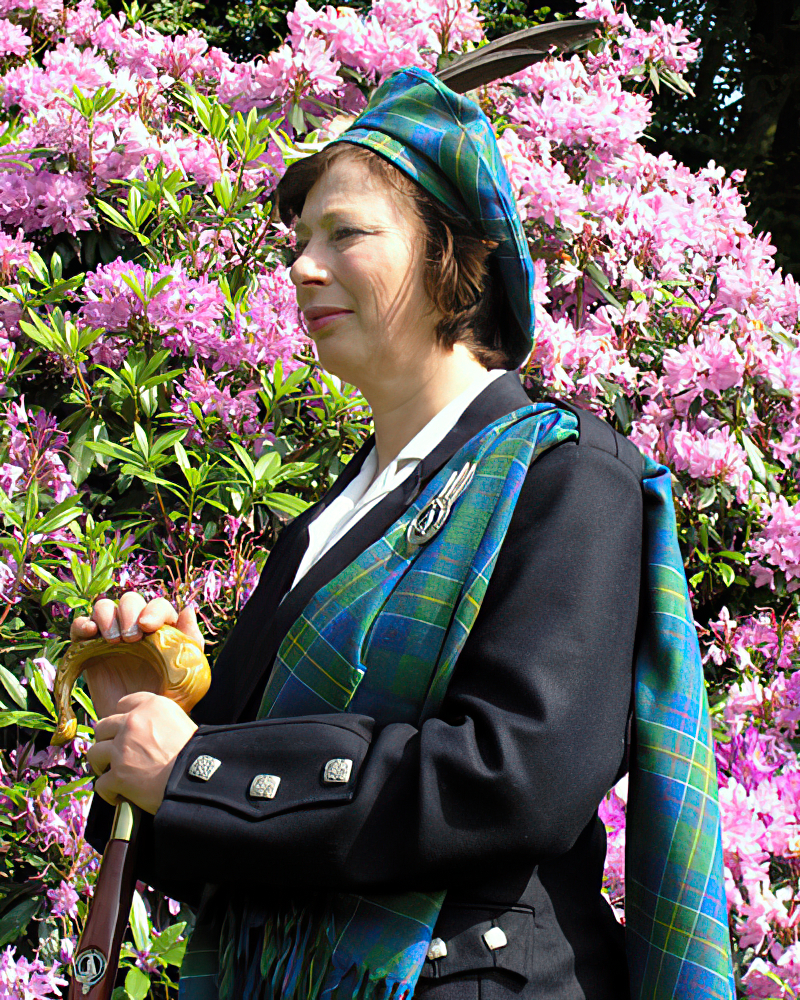
30th Chief of Clan Hunter

== Chiefs ==
Lady Pauline Hunter of Hunterston and of that Ilk is the 30th Laird and Chief of Clan Hunter. Her mid-19th century ancestor is reported in May, 1859 as furthering the philanthropic tradition of Clan Hunter; "The Lady of Hunterston tries to elevate and benefit her neighbours in the village of West Kilbride", while her husband, the Laird of Hunterston, "seeks the good of his tenants by provoking emulation amongst them, as regards the quality of their stock".

== Clan seat and castle ==
The seat of the chief of Clan Hunter has been at Hunterston Castle for over 800 years.

== Royal Charter ==
William Huntar of, the 10th laird was granted a Royal Charter by King Robert II of Scotland (1371-1390) signed in Stirling on the 2nd May 1374 for faithful services rendered. This Charter with the Royal Seal is preserved at Hunterston and on display in the castle. It remains the oldest document in the possession of the Hunter Family.

(1374.) Acquisition of Arnell. Charter by King Robert the Second to WILLIAM HUNTER, for faithful services rendered to him, of the lands of ARNELL, to be held by the said William Hunter and the heirs-male of his body of the Crown for payment of one penny of silver at Arnell at Whitsunday. The Charter is dated at Stirling the second day of May in the fourth year of the King's reign (1374).

Robert, by the grace of God, King of Scots, to all good men of his whole land, clerics and laymen, Greeting : Know ye that we have given, granted and by this our present charter have confirmed to our loved and faithful WILLIAM HUNTER, for his faithful service rendered and to be rendered to us, that whole land of ARNELL with pertinents which belonged to Andrew Cambell, Knight, and which the said Andrew, not led by force or fear nor falling into error but of his own free and pure will, gave up and purely and simply resigned to us by staff and baton and wholly renounced in all time coming for himself and his heirs, with all right and title that he had or might have in the said land with the pertinents : To hold and have to the said William and his heirs male lawfully procreate or to be procreated of his body of us and our heirs in fee and heritage by all their right marches and bounds, with all and singular liberties, commodities, easements and just pertinents whatsoever belonging or in what manner soever shall be justly known to belong in future to the said land, freely, quietly, wholly well and in peace. The said William and his heirs foresaid rendering therefor yearly to us and our heirs one penny of silver only at the said land of Arnell at the feast of Pentecost in name of " blench ferme " for wards, reliefs, marriages, burdens and other services whatsoever. In testimony of which thing we have commanded our seal to be appended to our present charter. WMtnesses, the venerable father in Christ, William Bishop of St. Andrews; John our firstborn Earl of Carryk, Steward of Scotland; Robert Earl of ffyff and of Meneteth, our beloved son; William Earl of Douglas; John of Carryk our Chancellor; James of Lyndesay our nephew; and Robert of Erskyne; Knights. At Strivelyne (Stirling) the second day of May the fourth year of our reign (i.e. 1374).

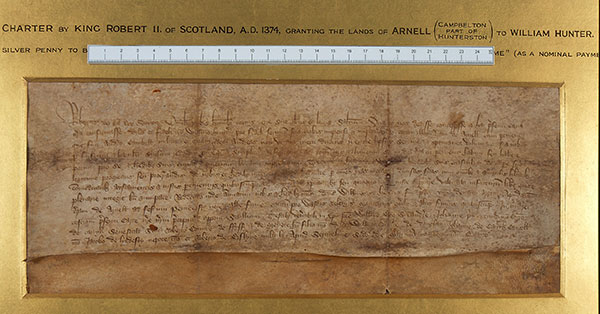
Close up of the 1374 Royal Charter

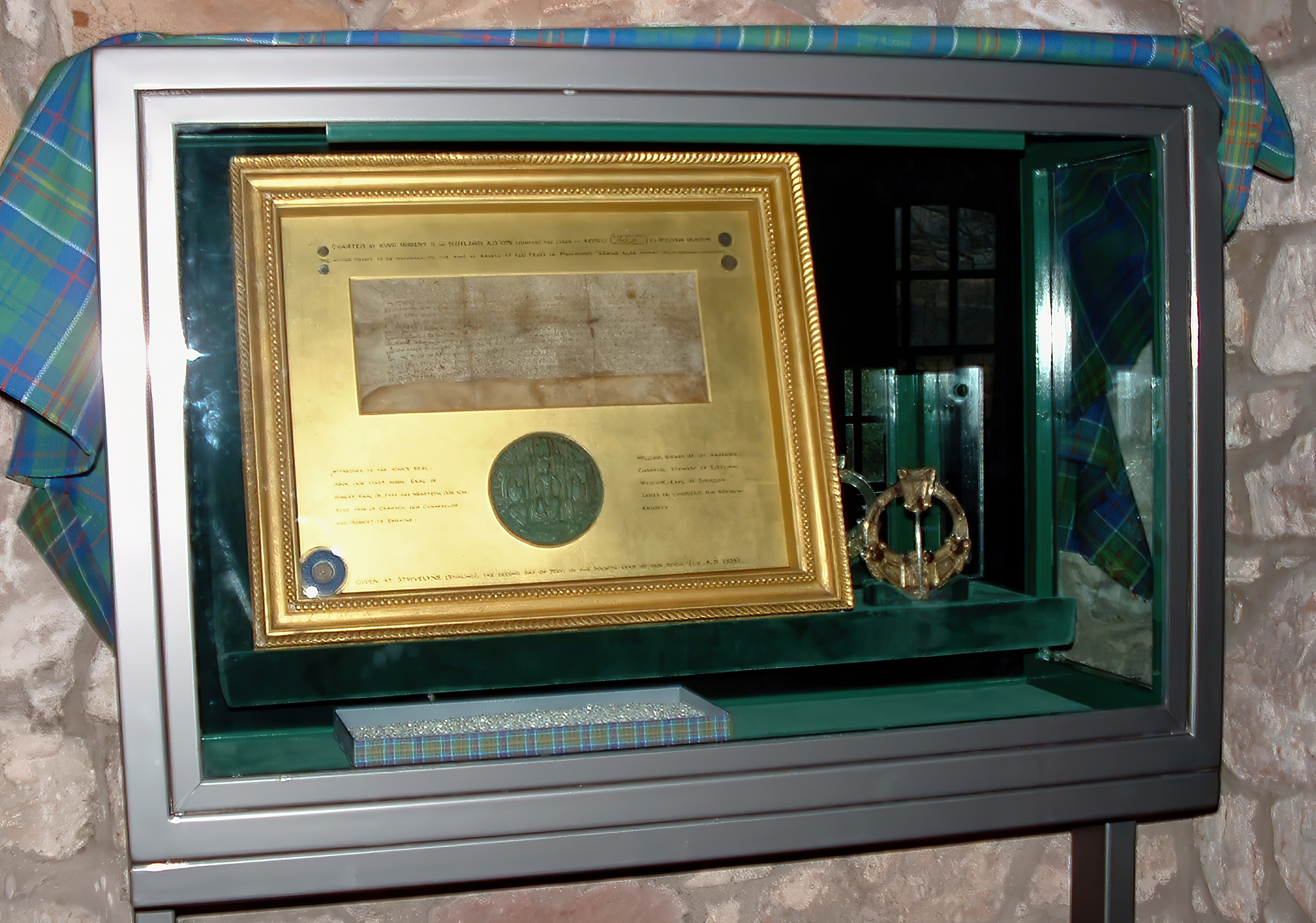
The 1374 Royal Charter and Hunterston Brooch in sealed cabinet in Hunterston Castle

== Tartans ==
The Clan Hunter tartan was designed in 1983 by Capt. T. Stuart Davidson, the founder of the Scottish Tartan Society. The design or Sett as it is known, has been named Hunter of Hunterston to distinguish it from other Hunter tartans such as:

Hunter Russell Mitchell Galbraith sett – A tartan shared between the four families.

Hunters of Bute sett – Hunters who sought allegiance from the Stuarts at one time.

Hunters of Peebleshire sett – An old branch of the Hunter family.

Image	Tartan Sett Name	
	Hunter Mitchel Galbraith Shared	It seems certain that the tartan was first known as Galbraith in the collection of the Highland Society of London. William Wilson and Sons of Bannockburn recorded the pattern as Russell in their pattern book of 1847, although it was named Hunter in the earlier book of 1819. John Telfer Dunbar states that he has a record of a Hunter tartan designed by a gentleman of the name Hunter in 1824 but without a thread count. Galbraiths (Briton's son in Gaelic) are connected with the Earls of Lennox, and at one time took protection as a Sept of Clan Donald. The name Galbraith is associated with the West Coast island of Gigha. Named in honour of General Billy Mitchell when it was adopted as the tartan of the United States Air Force pipe band. Wilsons of Bannockburn a weaving firm founded c1770 near Stirling. The Pattern books are in the National Museum of Antiquities, Edinburgh. Copies of the Pattern books and letters in the Scottish Tartans Society archive.
	Hunter of Bute	Mentioned in the notes of Lord Lyon's Tartan Committee May 1991
	Hunters of Peebleshire	Scottish Tartans Society only gives this Hunter and says it is believed to be worn by the Hunters of Peebleshire. From JCT files identified: 'Telfer Dunbar's 'fancy' 197-? ' but no further explanation. According to the late L. Anderson of Galashiels (c.1939), this was worn by the Hunters of Peebleshire, Ayrshire, Angus and Renfrewshire - Sindex. Other notes called it 'Old Hunter' and stated 'Thread count of 'Old Hunter' quoted to Lord Lyon in Sept 1990 by Hunter of Hunterston in the course of saying that it was one that was frequently confused with the newer Clan Hunter submitted in 1985 - #719 (original Scottish Tartans Authority reference)
	Hunter	Fashion version of Hunter, Original. Thread count halved to show sett. Very close to Hunter Old.
	Hunter (1775)	Presented to the Scottish Tartans Authority in Canada in 2003 by a Jean Hunter from Huntsville Ontario who had been given it by her Father the Rev. George W. Hunter, a minister in Aberdeen. The piece is a shawl 6 ft 6inches long by 19inches wide and is what is known as a hard, superfine tartan using typical Wilson of Bannockburn colours. The sett is selvedge to selvedge full repeat and the weave is 52epi. The sett is complex with 8 colours and 67 colour changes. Embroidered into the end of the shawl is 'Donnald 1775'.
	Hunter (USA)	Colour change by Peter MacDonald, with R & B reversed, for some US Clan Hunter members.
	Hunter (Wilson)	Chosen by the Chief as a 'second clan tartan in order to give our clanswomen an alternative choice for skirts and other clothing.' The first clan tartan referred to is #719 (original Scottish Tartans Authority reference). Although appearing in Wilson's 1819 pattern book, this tartan was patented by Hunter of Hunterston, Chief of Clan Hunter, and registered with Lord Lyon in 1991 (LCB 81. 26th Nov.). Jamie Scarlett MBE in 'Tartan: the Highland Textile' dates this as end of 18th century (and gives slightly different thread count). This data includes the light green as called for in Lyon Court record - see Hunter, Original. The Scottish Tartans Society version differs very slightly in some thread counts from this 'official' version from Lord Lyon records. This sett has been double-checked against Chief's original paperwork in Scottish Tartans Authority's Archives. It is (with a couple of minor exceptions) half the Wilson count. The count was taken from a manuscript account book in the National Museum of Antiquities of Scotland in Queen Street, Edinburgh. Samples in Scottish Tartans Authority's Dalgety Collection labelled: ' as near as Lochcarron can get.' This tartan is mentioned by Telford Dunbar in his 1962 'History of Highland Dress' (Page145) when he states that it appeared in William Wilson's stock list of 1800.
	Hunter Graham	Commemorating the wedding of Adeline Hunter and Stuart Graham. The tartan was created by combining the setts of the Graham of Montrose and the Hunter tartans.

== See also ==
- Scottish clan
- Barony of Ladyland
- Barnweill Church
