= William Miller Wallace =

United States Army general (1844–1924)

William Miller Wallace (January 9, 1844 – November 5, 1924) was a brigadier general in the United States Army.

He was born in Prairie du Chien, Wisconsin. Wallace married Alice Knight on January 18, 1871. He died in San Francisco, and is buried with Alice at Arlington National Cemetery.

== Career ==
Wallace originally joined the Union Army during the American Civil War. Following the war he was assigned to the 8th Infantry Regiment. Later assignments included the 6th Cavalry Regiment and the 2nd Armored Cavalry Regiment. His retirement was effective as of October 2, 1906.
