= Frank Wallace (piper) =

Frank Wallace (fl. late 1800s), Irish musician.

Frank and his brother, Michael Wallace (piper) were born in County Mayo, somewhere between Ballina and Westport. He travelled with his brother, both in Ireland and Britain, but apparently not to America. He was judged to be inferior in talent to his brother.
