= Robert Wallace =

Robert or Rob Wallace may refer to:

== Politicians ==
- Ben Wallace (politician) (Robert Ben Wallace, born 1970), British MP for Wyre and Preston North
- Robert Wallace (MP for Greenock) (1773–1855), Scottish politician, MP for Greenock, 1832–45
- Robert Wallace (Canadian politician) (1820–1899), Canadian member of parliament
- Robert Wallace (Edinburgh MP) (1831–1899), British member of parliament for Edinburgh East, 1886–99
- Sir Robert Wallace (Perth MP) (1850–1939), Irish-born politician, MP for Perth, 1895–1907
- Robert M. Wallace (politician) (1856–1942), United States representative from Arkansas
- Robert Wallace (British Army officer) (1860–1929), Irish lawyer, soldier and politician
- Jim Wallace, Baron Wallace of Tankerness (James Robert Wallace, born 1954), British Liberal Democrat life peer and MP for Orkney and Shetland, 1983-2001
- Robert B. Wallace (c. 1869–1928), American politician from New York
- Rob Wallace (politician) (born 1952), American politician from Florida

== Religious figures ==
- Robert Wallace (bishop) (died 1669), Bishop of the Isles, Scotland
- Robert Wallace (minister) (1697–1771), minister of the Church of Scotland and writer on population
- Robert Wallace (Unitarian) (1791–1850), English Unitarian minister

== Other people ==
- Robert Charles Wallace (1881–1955), Scottish-born Canadian geologist, educator, and administrator
- Robert Strachan Wallace (1882–1961), Australian academic, vice-chancellor of the University of Sydney, 1928–47
- Robert Wallace (biologist), discoverer of the Madidi titi, also known as the GoldenPalace.com monkey
- Robert Wallace (poet) (1932–1999), American poet and professor
- Robert Wallace (footballer) (1905–?), Scottish footballer
- Robert Wallace (professor) (1853–1939), Scottish professor of agriculture
- Robert M. Wallace (professor), professor of material science at the University of Texas at Dallas
- Robert M. Wallace (philosopher)
- Robert M. Wallace (judge) (1847–1914), justice of the New Hampshire Supreme Court

== Other uses ==
- SS Robert Wallace, a lake freighter that sank in 1902

== See also ==
- Robert M. Wallace (disambiguation)
- Bobby Wallace (disambiguation)
- Robert Wallis (disambiguation)
- Robert Waleys, MP for Ipswich
- Wallace (surname)
