= Robert M. Wallace =

Robert M. Wallace may refer to:

- Robert M. Wallace (judge)
- Robert M. Wallace (politician)
- Robert M. Wallace (philosopher)
- Robert M. Wallace (professor)

== See also ==
- Robert Wallace
