= Robert Wallis =

Robert Wallis may refer to:

- Robert Wallis (engraver) (1794–1878), English engraver
- Robert Wallis (footballer) (1904–?), English footballer
- Robert Wallis (politician), English politician, House of Commons 1597—1611
- Bob Wallis (1934–1991), jazz musician

== See also ==
- Robert Wallace (disambiguation)
- Robert Waleys, MP for Ipswich
- Wallis (surname)
