= Ponte di Tiberio (Rimini) =

Roman bridge in Rimini, Italy

Bridge of Tiberius Italian: Ponte di Tiberio
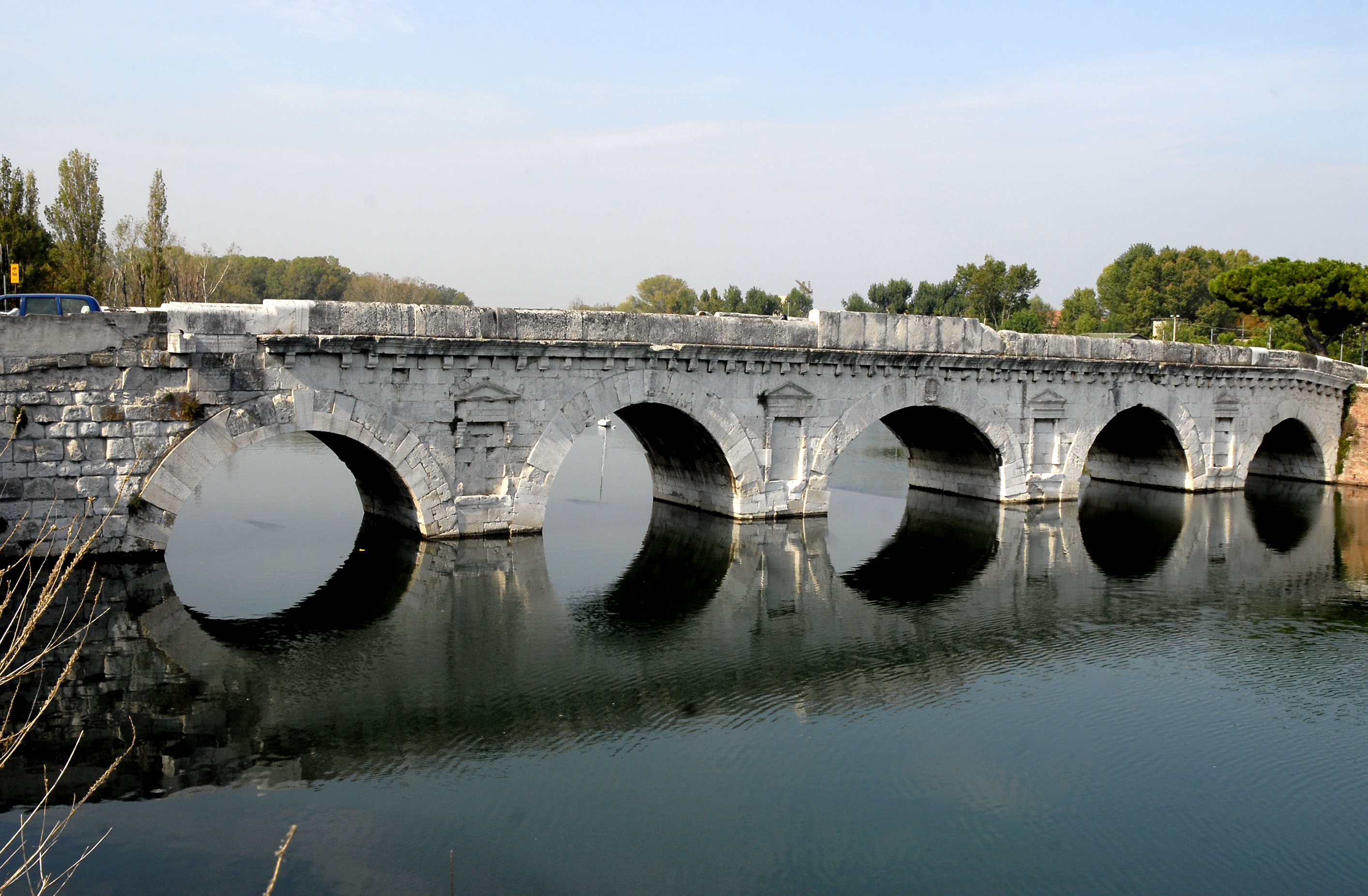
- The bridge viewed from downstream, September 2007
- Coordinates: 44°3′49.11″N 12°33′49.75″E
- Carries: Pedestrians
- Crosses: Marecchia (port canal)
- Locale: Rimini, Italy
- Other names: Ponte d'Augusto; Ponte di San Giuliano
- Named for: Tiberius

Characteristics
- Design: Arch bridge
- Material: Istrian stone
- Total length: 62.6 m (between abutments)
- Width: 8.6 m
- Longest span: 10.6 m
- No. of spans: 5

History
- Construction start: 14 AD
- Construction end: 21 AD

Location
- Interactive map of Bridge of Tiberius

The Bridge of Tiberius (Italian: Ponte di Tiberio), historically also the Bridge of Augustus (Ponte d'Augusto) or the Bridge of Saint Julian (Ponte di San Giuliano), is a Roman bridge in Rimini, in the region of Emilia-Romagna, northern Italy.

Constructed between 14 and 21 AD under the reigns of Roman emperors Augustus and Tiberius, the bridge traverses the Marecchia port canal at the southern end of two Roman roads, the Via Aemilia and the Via Popilia. The bridge was built to showcase the impressiveness of Roman monumental infrastructure, emphasised by its religious-theological decorative artwork, and it is the oldest surviving Roman bridge to be decorated with Greek orders.

In 552, the Ponte di Tiberio was intentionally damaged by the Gothic commander Usdrila to prevent the passage of Narses' Byzantine army; it was damaged again during Pandolfo IV's retreat from Rimini in 1528, and in 1743 by Spanish troops in the War of the Austrian Succession. In 1944, German forces retreating from the Battle of Rimini unsuccessfully ordered the bridge's destruction. Among the bridge's notable renovations are those of 1680, which restored the badly damaged northernmost arch using stones from Ponte di San Vito, and the 1970s, during which large amounts of gravel were excavated from the riverbed and the bridge's foundations were submerged in concrete under the direction of Vittoriano Viganò. From 2019, the bridge was progressively limited to motor traffic, and it was permanently pedestrianised in May 2020.

With the Arch of Augustus, the Ponte di Tiberio is considered one of Rimini's defining symbols, appearing on its public seals and coats of arms since the medieval era. Notable artists that have depicted the Ponte di Tiberio include Giovanni Bellini, Sebastiano Serlio, Antonio da Sangallo the Younger, Giovan Battista Piranesi, Richard Wilson, Robert Wallis, and Florent Fidèle Constant Bourgeois. Andrea Palladio considered the Ponte di Tiberio "the most beautiful and the most worthy of consideration" of all the bridges he surveyed; his stylised sketches of the bridge in I quattro libri dell'architettura (1570) inspired Green's Bridge, a Neo-Palladian bridge over the River Nore in Kilkenny, Ireland, completed in 1766.

== History ==
=== Antiquity ===
Ariminum (modern Rimini) was founded as an ancient Roman colonia in 268 BC, when the Roman Senate sent 6,000 settlers to the bank of the river Ariminus (Marecchia). Construction of the Ponte di Tiberio started during the reign of Roman emperor Augustus in 14 AD and finished under his successor, Augustus' adoptive son Tiberius, in 21 AD.

The bridge lies at the southern terminus of two Roman roads: the Via Aemilia, running northwest to Placentia (Piacenza), and the Via Popilia, running north along the Adriatic coastline reach Atria (Adria), where it joined the Via Annia. The Ponte di Tiberio crossed the Ariminus, known for its torrential nature, and connected the end of Ariminum's decumanus maximus (the present-day Corso d'Augusto) on the Ariminus' right bank to the present-day Borgo San Giuliano on the river's left bank. Given this strategic location, the Ponte di Tiberio presumably replaced an earlier bridge; it was most likely wooden, and excavations and maps suggest that it was located c. 500 metres (1,600 feet) further upstream.

The bridge was the final major project of Augustus in Ariminum, which included the construction of the Arch of Augustus, the renovations of the Via Flaminia and Via Aemilia, and the renaming of the colonia as Colonia Augusta Ariminensis. Until the 19th century, the bridge was called the Bridge of Augustus (Italian: Ponte d'Augusto): it has only recently been commonly called the Bridge of Tiberius (Ponte di Tiberio).

The bridge may have been the site of an ancient Roman port. An underwater wall on the river's right bank intersects the bridge, which local historian Giovanni Rimondini has suggested may have been the supporting structures of the port. The wall was uncovered in the 1970s interventions, but was not photographed or surveyed before being submerged in concrete. Other scholars believe that the wall postdates Roman Ariminum.

In 552, the bridge was threatened by the Byzantine army under the command of general Narses, which was marching from Ravenna towards Rome. In June 552, to prevent the advance of Narses' army, Procopius records that the Gothic commander Usdrila "demolished the bridge" across the Marecchia at Rimini; the bridge could "only be crossed ... barely and with difficulty by a single unarmed man, walking on foot". It is unclear to what extent or how the bridge was damaged. In his translation of Procopius, Claude Maltret suggests that both sides of the bridge (utroque latere) were damaged, while Filippo Battaglini suggested that only the last arch towards Borgo San Giuliano was destroyed. In the ensuing battle, Usdrila was killed, and Narses crossed Rimini using a fleet of ships that was following his army along the Adriatic coast.

=== Medieval era ===
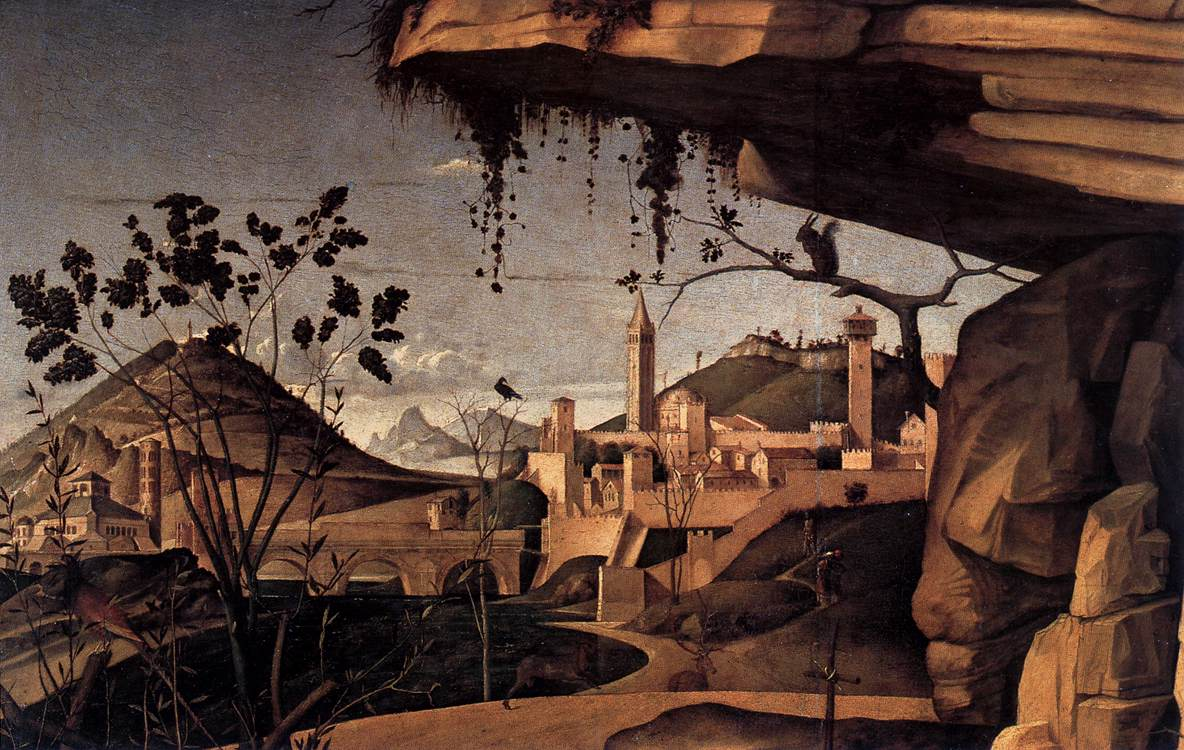
Background of St Jerome in the Desert (c. 1480) by Giovanni Bellini, depicting the Ponte d'Augusto

During the medieval era, a tower flanked the San Giuliano end, to the left of those exiting the bridge. The tower was first mentioned in a papal bull by Pope Gregory VII in 1078. Writing in 1617, Cesare Clementini said that the tower was straightened in 1473 but was no longer extant. From the latter half of the 14th century, the bridge would have been filled with wooden stalls of merchants during the annual Fiera di San Giuliano. At the city's end, the bridge faced the narrow medieval city gate known as Porta Bologna; the bridge was destroyed by the time Rimini's peripheral road was opened in 1829.

The Ponte d'Augusto, alongside the Arch of Augustus, began to be used in symbols and seals of the city sometime between the 10th and 13th centuries.

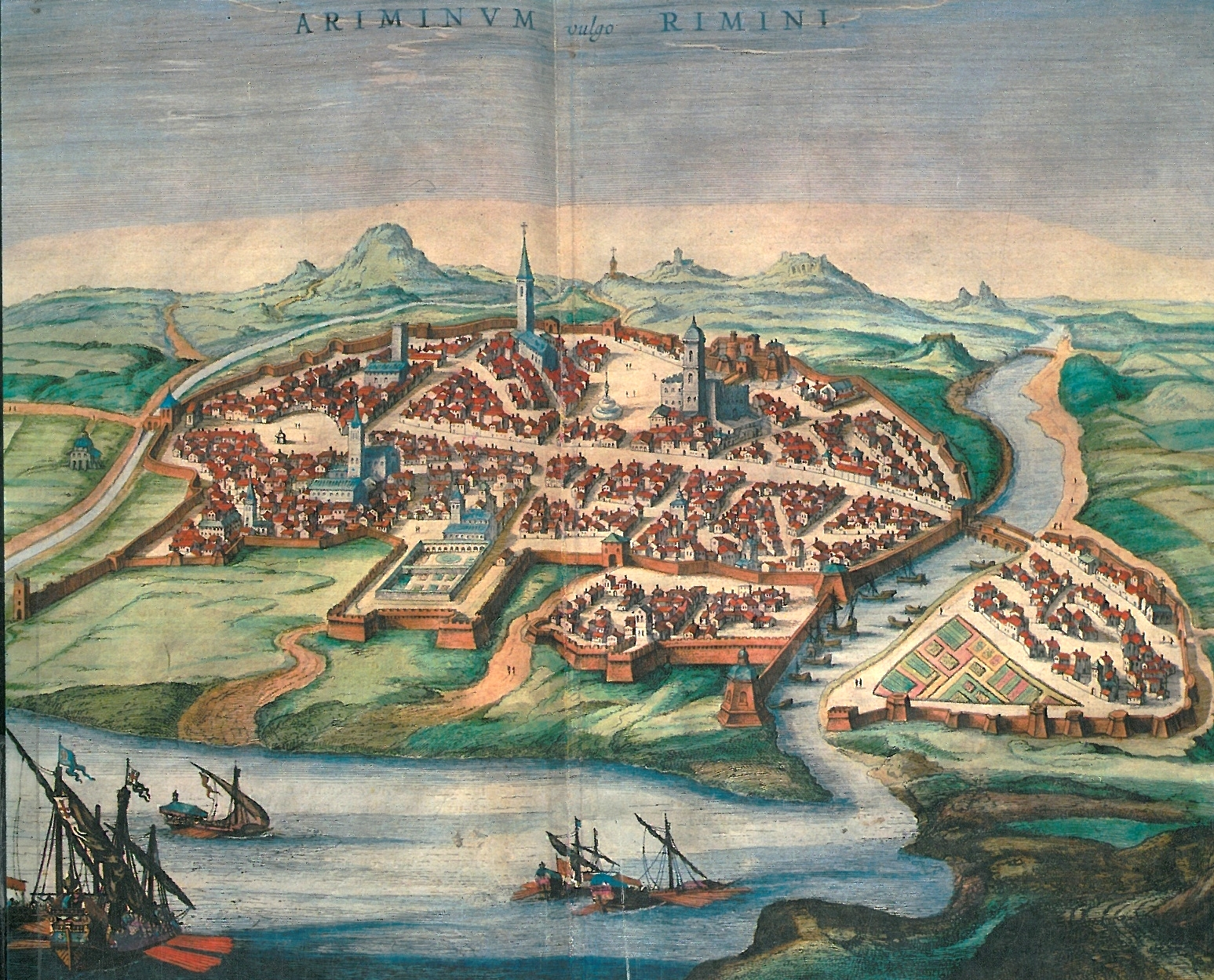
Georg Braun's 1572 topography of Rimini, showing the Ponte d'Augusto over the Marecchia

In January 1528, the bridge survived a fire plotted by Pandolfo IV, the last of Rimini's Malatesta rulers. Pandolfo had reoccupied the city from 14 June 1527, remaining until the troops of the Papal States broke their siege on the city on 17 June 1428. According to Clementini, in his final retreat, Pandolfo set fire to the last arch before the Borgo San Giuliano. Though he intended to demolish other arches, he was assured by Odet of Foix, Viscount of Lautrec, that his troops would enter Rimini from by other entrance. Stones from the collapsed arch were recovered in 1680, 1807, and in the 1970s. Inscriptions record that the bridge underwent restoration in 1582, 1592, and 1603. A meeting of Rimini's municipal council on 4 August 1612 noted that the last arch was "so damaged that those looking up from below see the air and sky"; it was further damaged by an earthquake in 1672. As a temporary measure, an embankment or wooden walkway likely secured the bridge's final arch to retain its navigability.

In 1680, under the direction of amateur Ferrarese architect Agostino Martinelli, the final arch was restored using similar materials from the Ponte di San Vito, a collapsed Augustan bridge located seven Roman miles along the Via Aemilia, and new stones from Venice. Some had suggested that the arch be renovated with brick. Writing in 1681, Martinelli contested that Pandolfo IV set fire to the last arch: the bridge's damage was inconsistent with a fire, and the final arch by the city showed similar breaks. Instead, Martinelli suggested that the damage was the result of wind or the people of Rimini hacking at the outermost arches.

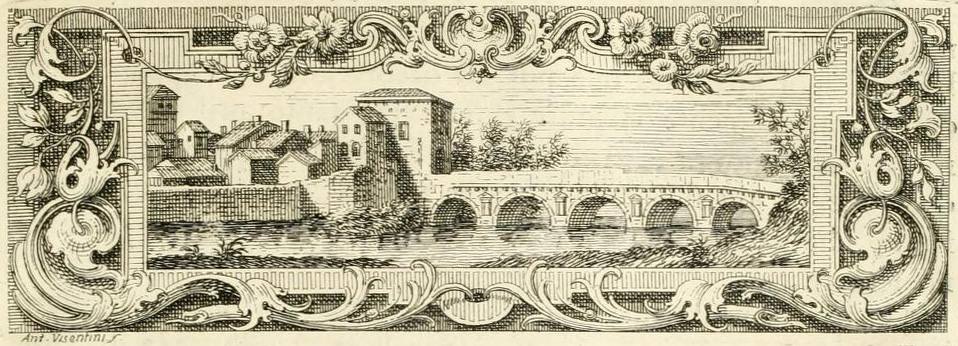
A 1741 drawing of the bridge by architect Antonio Visentini, showing the Porta Bologna

The bridge was restored again in 1735 under the orders of Giulio Alberoni, as remembered on an inscription on the first pier towards the city, again using stones from the quarry at San Vito. During the War of the Austrian Succession, Spanish troops passing through Rimini in support of the Papal States placed two rakes "on the Ponte di Augusto, which was then greatly damaged". Among the damage caused, in 1743, the bridge's downstream-side inscription was cut to place a beam for a gate. Following an earthquake in 1786, the bridge was restored in 1792.

=== Modern history ===
In the 19th century, the bridge was often called the Ponte di San Giuliano. It was designated as a national monument in 1885. A note from the municipal government on 24 August 1894 reported that the riverbed had risen by 2.5 metres (8.2 feet) since 1876.

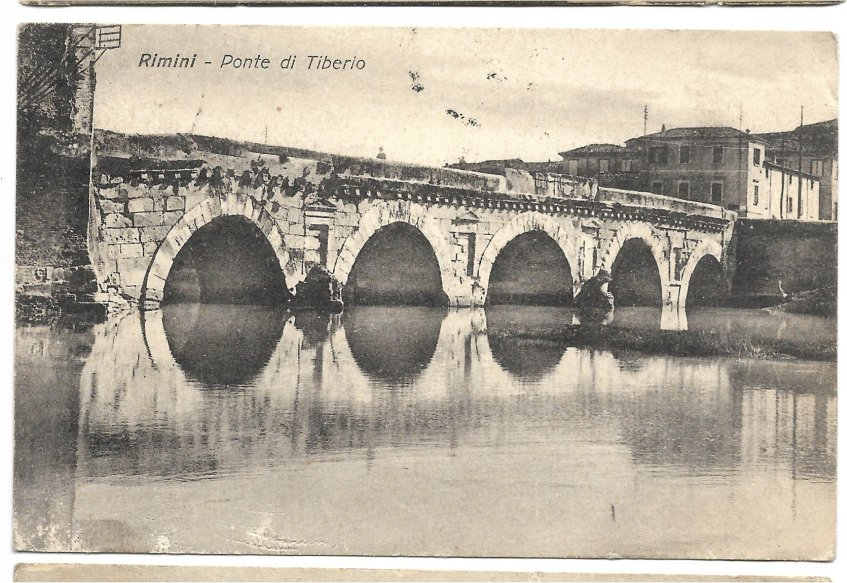
The Ponte di Tiberio in a 1927 postcard

From the end of the 1920s until 1931, the Marecchia was diverted to flow further north.

During the Battle of Rimini in the Second World War, the last retreating German forces had been ordered to explode the bridge, but did not. Marshal Willi Trageser of the 2nd Parachute Division reported to his command that "the bridge had blown", when instead, according to Trageser, several attempts to detonate the bridge had failed, leading to minimal damage. Trageser was using low-quality ammonal, laid in 100 kilograms (220 pounds) at the bridge's base and 160 kilograms (350 pounds) across eight charges under the road surface. Only two charges exploded, which Trageser attributed to a crossing of wires along the bridge's gutter, causing small exploisons. The ammonal was also likely weakened by rain. Colonel Horst Pretzell and Lieutenant Colonel Rudolf Rennecke later said that the German high command had ordered the bridge to be spared, though the order was not communicated to the evacuating troops. In any case, the Marecchia had flooded after heavy rainfall during the overnight retreat on 20–21 September 1944. Trageser's account was accepted by the German high command. According to the post-war account of a soldier involved in the detonations, the poor wire connections were intended by Trageser, who had also defied orders to demolish the Arch of Augustus. The Ponte di Tiberio was the only bridge not to be destroyed along the Marecchia during the German retreat.

On 29 January 1957, during maintenance works, undetonated sticks of ammonal were found on the bridge, which was temporarily closed to ensure their safe removal. The following day, the bridge's closure was reported by Amedeo Montemaggi, then an editor at Il Resto del Carlino, who reconstructed the events of Trageser's decisions in subsequent years, culminating in Trageser's widow being welcomed to Rimini at the invitation of the municipal government in 1981.

In the 1970s, substantial intervention was carried out on the bridge as part of the rearranagement of the port canal by Vittoriano Viganò. As part of these interventions, gravel around the bridge was excavated, and the piles at the base of the piers were submerged in concrete. The gravel removed measured a depth of nearly 3 metres (9.8 feet).

=== Pedestrianisation and surrounding redevelopment ===
In 2008, the municipal administration of Alberto Ravaioli began a feasibility study on the bridge's pedestrianisation. At the time, the brige was crossed by 10,500 vehicles daily. A proposed tunnel diversion was initially accepted by the municipal government, but rejected in June 2015.

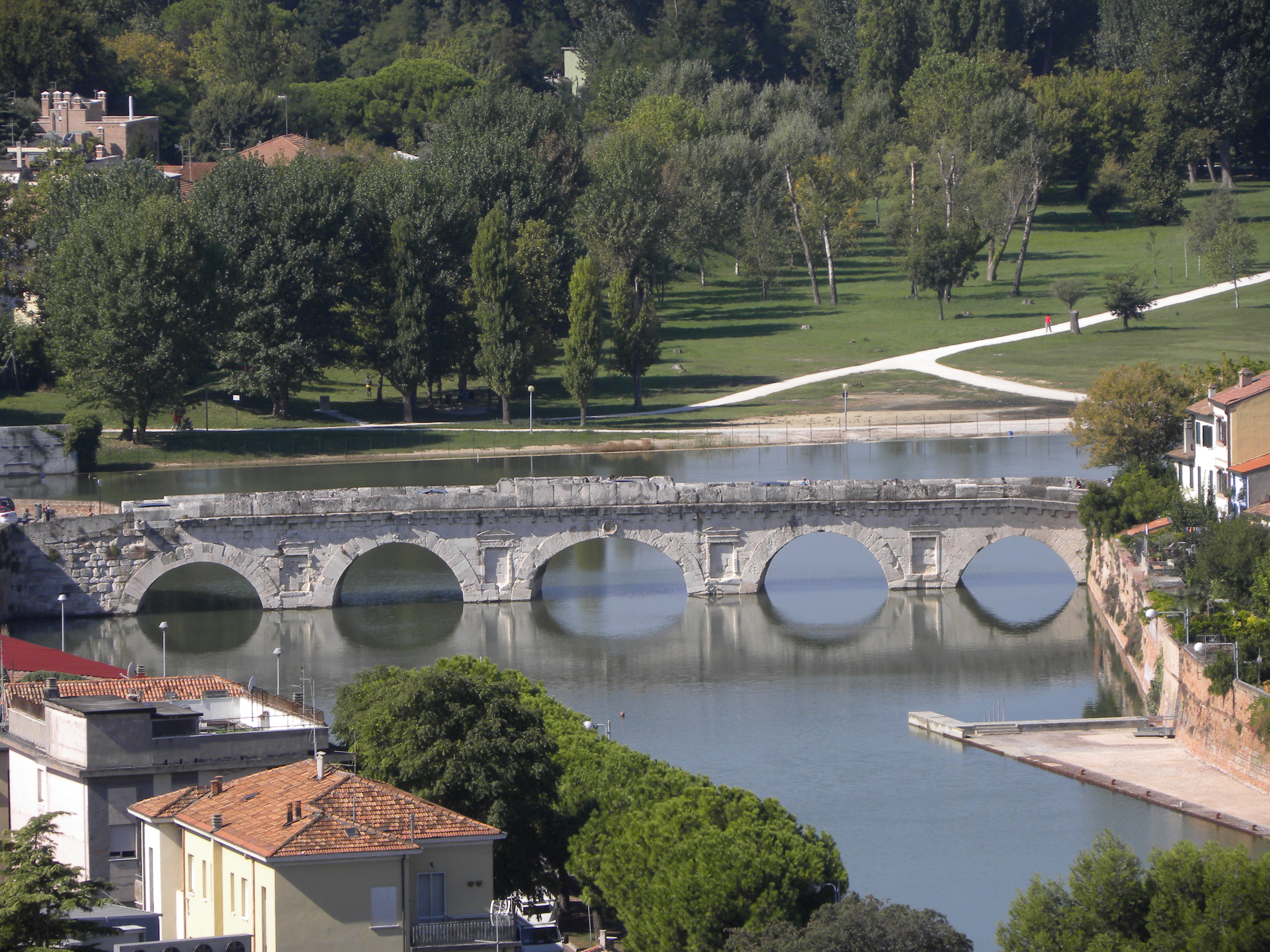
An aerial view of Ponte di Tiberio, showing the XXV April Park in the background along which the Marecchia used to flow, in September 2015

In 2014 a project called "The Tiberio Project" aimed to reorganise the road system near the bridge and redevelop the entire area of San Giuliano a mare.

In 2016, an archaeological park was inaugurated by the bridge's San Giuliano end, collecting 155 stones that were once part of the bridge. The park retells the history of the bridge, its materials, and ancient Roman construction techniques. Its stones had been recovered during works on the river between 1989 and 1991, and left on the riverbank until they were catalogued in 2005. While most of the stones date to the ancient Romans, some are inscribed with later periods, possibly linked to restoration dates.

Between 2017 and 2018, a small public square was reorganised near the bridge, overlooking the water. From 2019, the bridge was progressively limited to motor traffic, and was permanently pedestrianised in May 2020.

In 2021, the bridge's bimillennium was celebrated with the twenty-third edition of the Ancient World Festival, a local historical festival in Rimini. In 2014, the bridge's bimillennium had been the subject of an issue of Ariminum, the bimonthly history and culture journal of Rimini's Rotary Club.

== Architecture ==
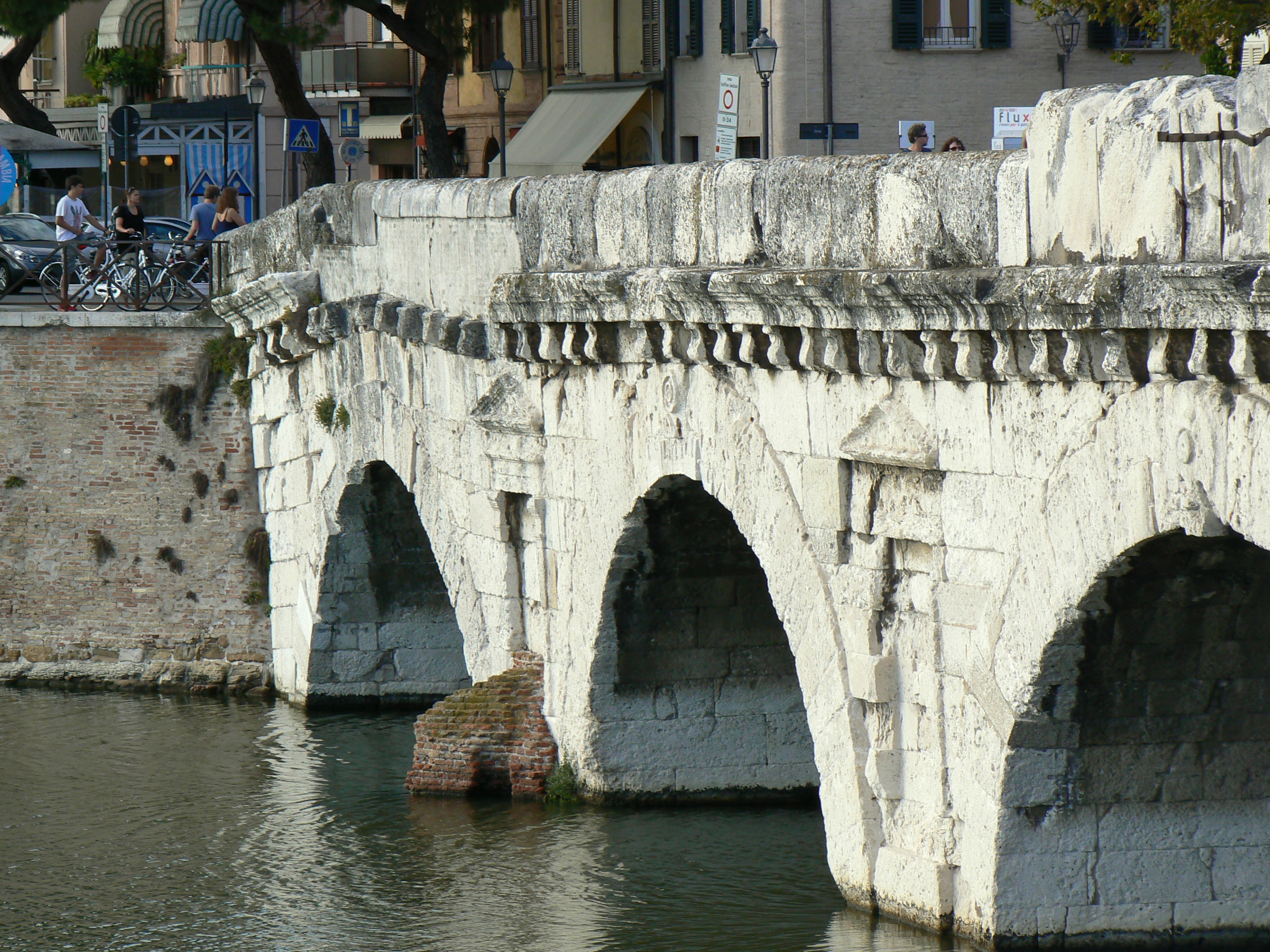
The bridge (pictured in September 2015) from the Marecchia's right bank, showing the disrepair on the final arch by Borgo San Giuliano

Sited on a major thoroughfare, the bridge was built to showcase the impressiveness of Roman monumental infrastructure. It is the oldest surviving Roman bridge to be decorated with Greek orders, though its lower parts are typical of republican or Etruscan architecture, suggesting a confused or transitional style, or the work of a provincial architect intending to undermine the bridge's monumental purpose. The bridge's religious-theological decorations intended to render the crossing of the bridge a quasi-religious act, sanctifying a traveller's passage between the central Italian regions and Cispadania.

The bridge is slightly humpbacked. Due to military history, the bridge is visibly less well-preserved on its San Giuliano end.

=== Materials ===
The bridge's stones do not come from local quarries, and were likely transported to Ariminum by sea. The exterior cladding, with an average thickness of 40 centimetres (16 inches), is of white limestone from the Roman quarry in Aurisina, known as Istrian stone. The stones were laid by opus quadratum, using iron clamps to minimise the distance between stones, between which a lead coating was placed. The tongs used to lay the stones in place left extant marks on unseen stones. Once placed, the stones were worked to achieve their fineness. The interior core of the piers and arches are made of fragments bound with mortar, the same technique used to construct the Arch of Augustus.

Extant brickwork on the bridge's downstream-side on the city end are remains of the medieval San Pietro gate, which was demolished in the 19th century. The base of one of the structures includes the relief of a four-petalled rose; this was the base of the medieval tower, and the rose is from a Roman cemetery on the Via Aemilia. On the San Giuliano end, archaeological surveys suggest that the bridge originally extended for over ten metres further. A nearby row of stones may have been Roman blocks later repurposed for a medieval fortification.

=== Piers and arches ===
The bridge features five semicircular arches, in Doric style, made of white Istrian stone, with an average span length of c. 8 metres (26 feet).

The piers, made of ashlar blocks below the water level, widen at their base. Rather than foundations, the piers rest on insulated wooden rafts supported by piles of oak, equipped with breakwater spurs to accommodate the flow of the river's current. The piles are c. 35 centimetres (14 inches) in diameter, and between 3 metres (9.8 feet) and 5 metres (16 feet) in length. The wood has hardened since its placement. In 1973, gravel underneath the bridge was removed, revealing the piles underneath the bridge's piers, before they were submerged in concrete. These piles were rusticated, shaped like a boat by the river current, with a prow facing upstream and a rounded stern downstream, preventing the formation of whirlpools that could threaten the bridge's stability. As noted by Andrea Palladio's study, the piers are inclined relative to the road axis to offer less resistance to the Marecchia. By requiring many different stones, this inclination would have presented a significant challenge during the bridge's planning and construction. After some cracks emerged following the removal of gravel, the 1970s interventions added tie-rods, at two-thirds the piers' height, to provide structural support for the bridge.

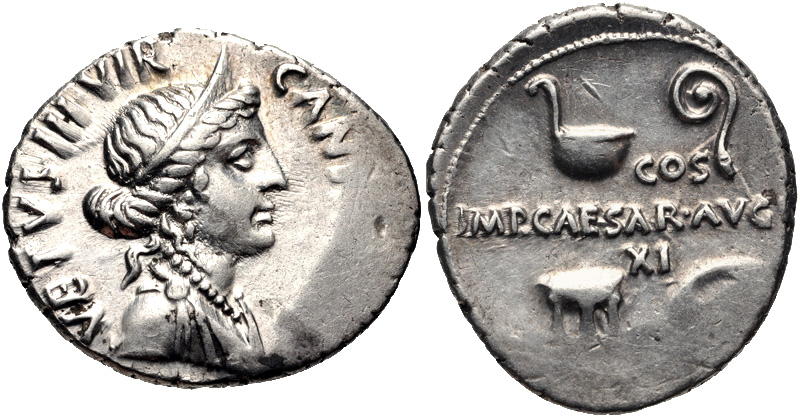
A denarius struck in Augustus' reign in 16 BC, whose obverse depicts a simpulum (top left), lituus (top right), and patera (bottom right)

The keystone of each arch is decorated on either side with reliefs, of which five remain visible. In the central arch, the keystones are the corona civica on the downstream side and the clipeum virtutis on the upstream side; both are symbols of Augustus. On the downstream side, on the keystone of the centre-right arch (nearer Borgo San Giuliano) is a patera, symbolising the septemviri epulonum who organised sacred banquets, while on the keystone of the centre-right arch is an amphora, symbolising the quindecimviri sacris faciundis, the college with priestly duties. Finally, on the upstream side, the keystone with the patera relief is bookended with a lituus, a curved wand used by augurs to mark templa. The five remaining arches likely had other symbols relating to religious colleges presided by Augustus, possibly including a simpulum, a ladle-shaped vessel used for libations, and an apex, the hat worn by flamines, priest of the ancient Roman religion. The patera, simpulum, and lituus often featured on Augustan coins.

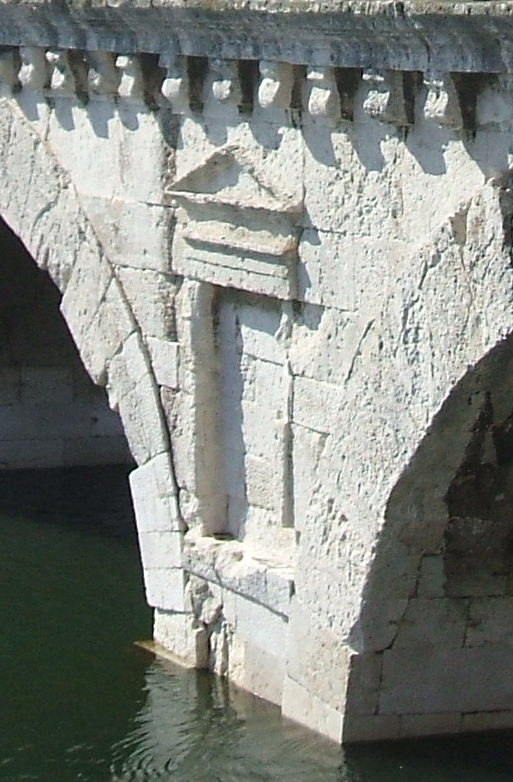
One of the bridge's empty aediculae, April 2015

Each spandrel between arches is decorated with the façade of a Doric entablature and pediment, a quasi-aedicula, which is 20 centimetres (7.9 inches) deep and empty inside. If they did not originally house statues, their emptiness may be the result of incompletion, or reflect some aniconism.

=== Upper decorations ===
Above the arches, on each side, modillions supporting continuous corbelled cornices are topped with a covering coping. A stone along the upstream-side coping features two deep recesses, leading to the bridge's legends.

An epigraph commemorating the construction of the bridges is located on the coping over the central span on either side of the bridge. The inscriptions record both Augustus and Tiberius as the bridge's constructors:

- The upstream-side epigraph was restored by the order of the Italian government between 1851 and 1853, due to the severe damage on its surface. The inscription was covered with a supporting iron cage, with visible bars on the inscription's backside. Rather than redo any missing parts of the inscription, the restorers opted to fill them with extant "pozzolanic lime and iron foam" resin.
- The downstream-side epigraph was tampered during the 17th century wars of the Austrian and Spanish succession, when, in 1743, it was cut to install the beam of a gate.

Detail of the upstream inscription of thebridge
Latin inscription	English translation
IMP(ERATOR). CA[E]SAR. DIVI. F(ILIVS). AVGVST[VS. PONTIFEX. M]AXIM(VS). [CO(N)SVL- XIII. IMP(PERATO)R. X]X. / TRIBVNIC(IA). POTEST(ATATE). XXVIII. P(ATER). P(ATRIAE). / TI(BERIVS). CAESAR. DIVI. AUGVSTI. F(ILIVS). DIVI. IULI. / N(EPOS). AV(GVSTVS). BRIDGES[F(EX). MAXIM(VS). CO(N)SVL)]. III. IMP(ERATOR). VIII TRIB(VNICIA). POTEST(ATE) XXII. / DEDERE	Emperor Caesar, son of God, Pontifex Maximus, Consul for the thirteenth time, victorious General for the twentieth, with the Tribune in power for the thirty-seventh time, Father of the Fatherland. Tiberius Caesar son of the God Augustus, grandson of the God Julius, Augustus, Pontifex Maximus, Consul for the fourth time, victorious General for the twelfth time, built this bridge.

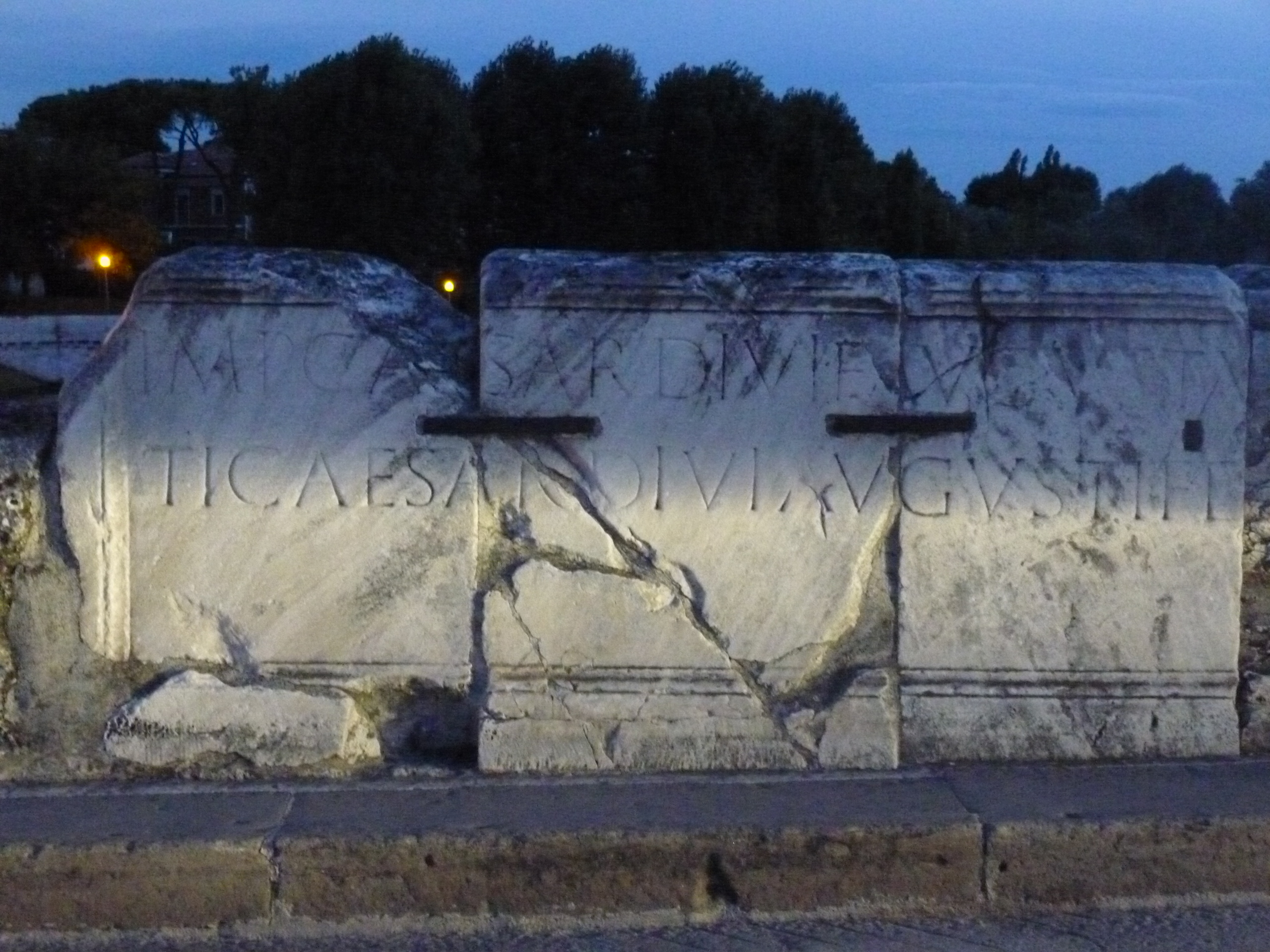
The bridge's upstream-side epigraph, August 2015

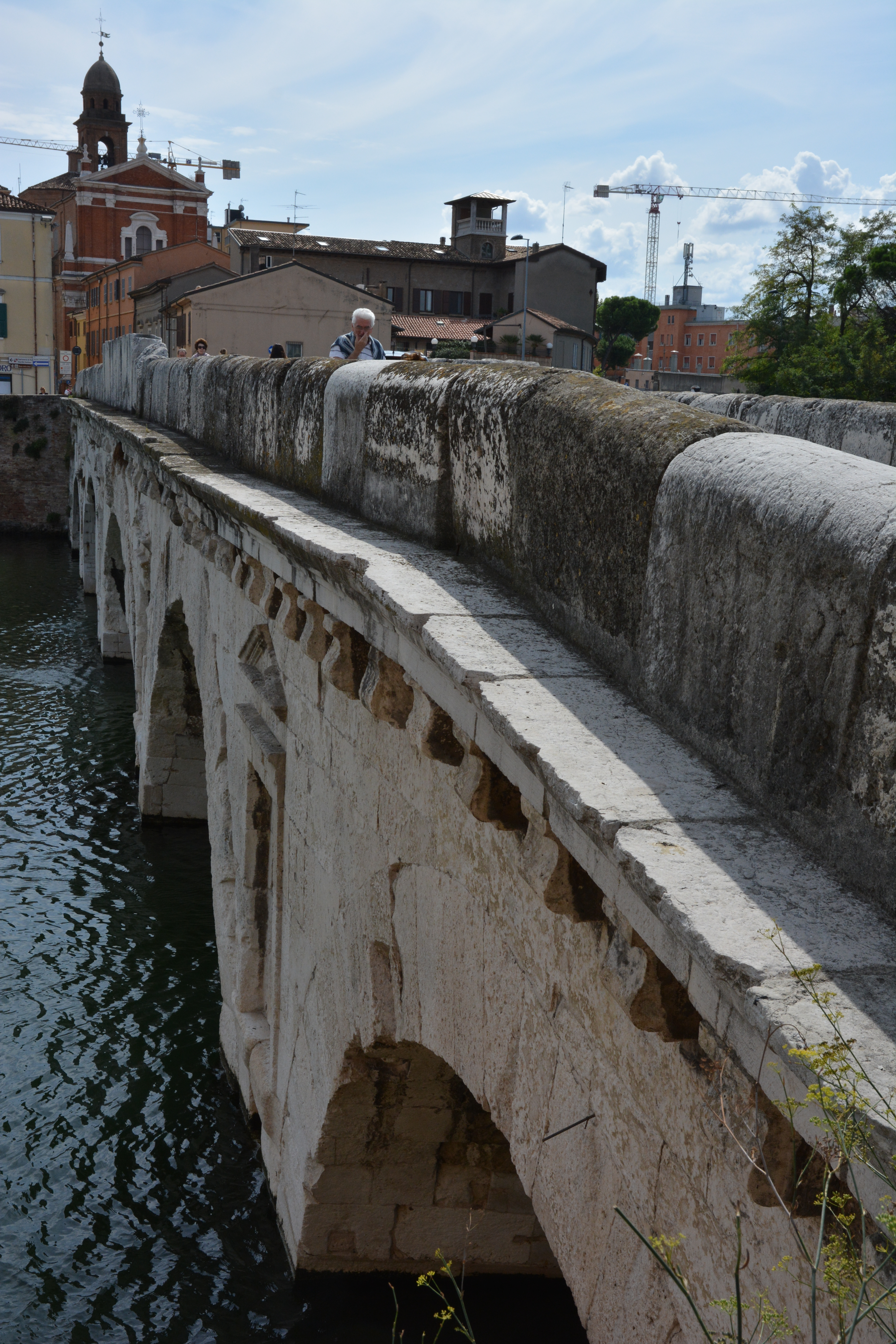
Detail of the downstream-side coping looking towards the city, September 2015

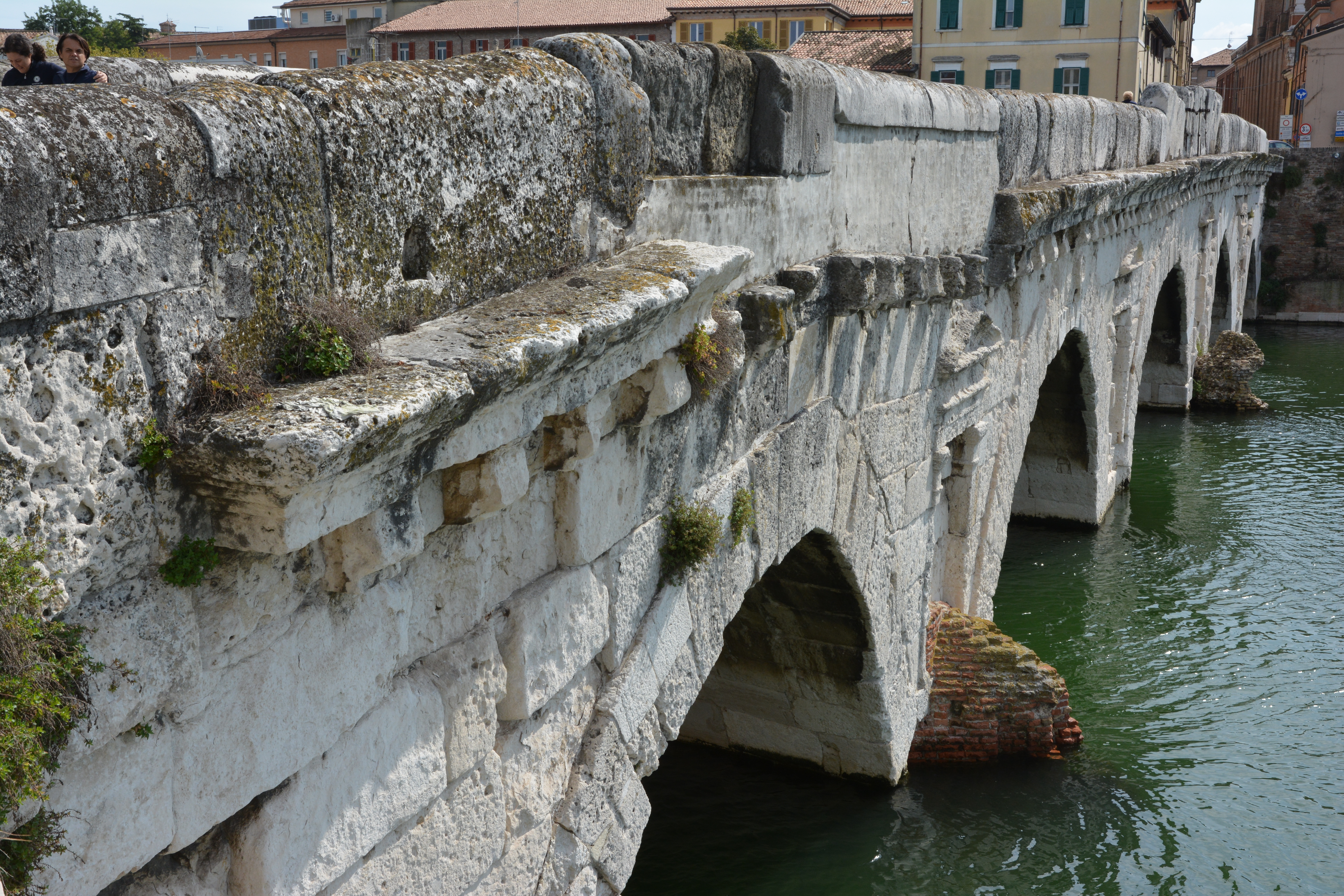
Detail of the upstream-side cornice by the Borgo San Giuliano end, September 2015

=== Road paving ===
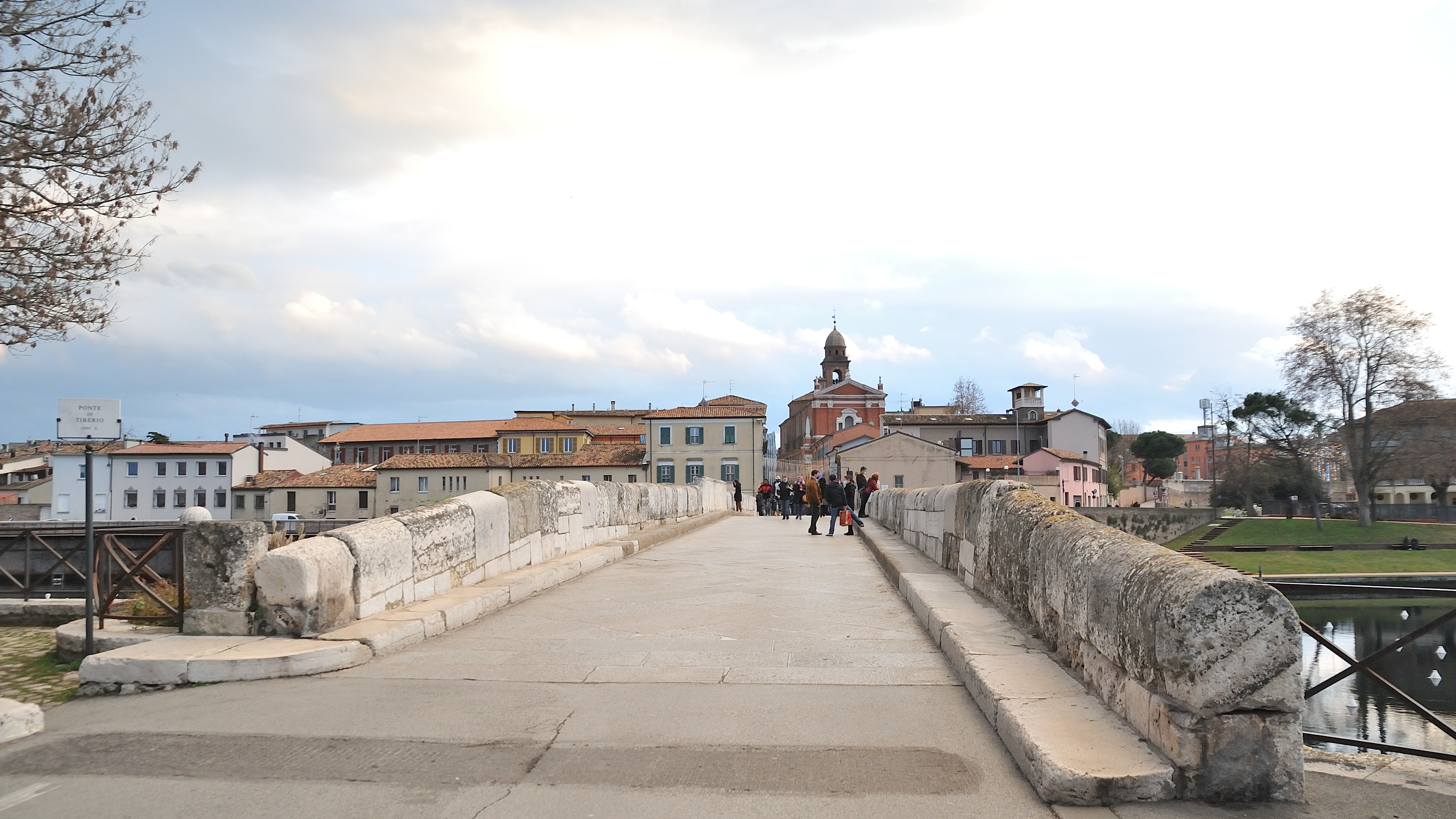
The road paving, looking towards the city, in January 2022

Since the 1880s, the bridge has been paved with granite slabs from Alzo, in Pella, Piedmont. The preceding pavement, unlikely to date from the bridge's construction, was made of hard flint squares bound with cement; its poor state of conservation was first noted in 1810, when the bridge was partially filled with quadrilateral flints from the Apennines. Within five years, the district engineer complained about mud on the bridge. The papal legations of Ravenna and Forlì, who were responsible for the bridge, refused to finance further expenditures, which would have to wait until the unification of Italy. Thus, half of the repavement work in 1883, which cost 7,400 lire, was financed by the central government, while the remaining half was split between the provincial and municipal governments.

The road paving was last restored in 1995. Contracted to ICLES, a company from Verucchio, the 19th-century granite slabs were lifted and then reinserted in their original place after the subfloor was evened.

The original sidewalks were composed of trachyte slabs, possibly originating from the Euganean Hills. They were raised by 30 centimetres (12 inches) and were 60 centimetres (24 inches) wide. Some of the original sidewalks are extant, while others have been replaced with Istrian stone blocks.

=== Ramps ===
The bridge originally had an access ramp on either side, given that Rimini's ancient urban floor was 4 metres (13 feet) lower than today's: while the city has been raised over time, the bridge has subsided, perhaps alongside the floor of Borgo San Giuliano. With these ramps, the bridge's structure would have had a distinctive trapezoid shape. The downstream-side cornice of the last arch before the city is angled compared to the rest of the cornice, indicating the ramp's presence.

Excavations in the city end in 1881 found a Greek marble base belonging to one of the ramps; at its meeting on 8 July or 14 December 1881, the municipal government considered a request by Carlo Tonini to fund further excavations, at a cost of 2,000 lire. Fearing that the costs would rise, Tonini's request was rejected. Some of the pavement of these ramps may have been uncovered by the opening of Rimini's peripheral road in 1829. Excavations in 2022 revealed a small arch in the wall of the ramp on the bridge's city end, allowing floodwater to pass through the bridge.

A second ramp was discovered in the San Giuliano end in 2007, after an excavation by local archaeologist Marcello Cartoceti.

According to Cesare Clementini, two colossal statues flanked either side of the bridge at its city end. The bridge may have been attached to the city's Roman walls.

== Devil legend ==
The bridge is nicknamed the Devil's Bridge (Italian: Ponte del diavolo, Romagnol: Pont de 'e Dievul), following two recesses resembling the marks of devil-like hooves or horns on the bridge's upstream-side coping. The recesses were likely used to fix pulleys so that material could be hoisted from boats underneath the bridge.

In one account of the legend, the bridge's construction was hampered by stones that continually collapsed, leading Tiberius to make a pact with the devil, who could claim the first soul crossing the bridge if he ensured its construction. The devil built the bridge overnight, and cheating the devil, Tiberius sent a dog over the bridge. The devil kicked the bridge in an attempt to destroy it, but could only leave marks as he had constructed it so well.

In another variant, Jupiter told Tiberius that the best boulders for the bridge could be found in Perticara, but could only be transported to Rimini by the devil, who constructed it in return for the first soul crossing the bridge. Jupiter, sending a dog across the bridge first, angered the devil, who left the final stone in Perticara, known as the Devil's Stone (Sasso del Diavolo).

In another variant, instead of a soul, the devil was promised an anma, which at the time could either mean a soul (anima) or a cheese, which was instead rolled over the bridge.

== Depictions and legacy ==
=== Symbol of Rimini ===
Rimini's coat of arms, showing a stylised Ponte di Tiberio underneath the Arch of Augustus on the left-hand side of the shield

With the Arch of Augustus, the Ponte di Tiberio is considered one of Rimini's defining symbols, appearing on its public seals and coats of arms since the medieval era. In the Tempio Malatestiano, a plaque by Agostino di Duccio appears to be a stylised depiction of the bridge. The Diocese of Rimini's local newspaper, Il Ponte, takes its name from the bridge.

Because of its location between Rimini's city centre and the Monumental Cemetery of Rimini, the Ponte di Tiberio has been on the route of many of Rimini's notable funeral processions, including those of Anacleto Ricci, a boy scout killed in the fire that engulfed the Grand Hotel Rimini in 1920, the first victims of the Second World War in 1940, and filmmaker Federico Fellini in 1993.

In 2014, the governments of both Italy and San Marino, which neighbours Rimini, celebrated the bridge's bimillenary. On 2 May, the Italian Istituto Poligrafico e Zecca dello Stato released two million postage stamps, designed by Rita Fantini, depicting the Ponte di Tiberio. The stamp, which measured 48 millimetres (1.9 inches) by 40 millimetres (1.6 inches), carried a value of €1.90. On 21 June, the Sammarinese Azienda autonoma di Stato filatelica e numismatica unveiled a €10 proof coinage in Rimini's Museo della Città, which depicted the bridge on the reverse face. 6,000 copies of the silver coin were minted, which were intended as a collector's item and had an issue price of €37.

=== Artistic depictions and influence ===
The bridge has been depicted by several notable artists. A boccale jug made of local majolica and paste, and therefore likely dating to the mid-14th century, depicts a stylised version of the Ponte di Tiberio; it was recovered from Borgo San Giuliano, which was known for its taverns and wine merchants. In St Jerome in the Desert (c. 1480), preserved in the Uffizi, Giovanni Bellini painted the Ponte di Tiberio alongside Ravenna's San Vitale and the Mausoleum of Theodoric and Verona's Sant'Anastasia.

While the first artistic depictions date to the medieval era, the first drawings are from the 15th century. Among the earliest sketches, Cyriacus of Ancona, Michele Fabrizio Ferrarini, and Giovanni Sallustio Peruzzi recorded the bridge's epigraph. In 1526, Antonio da Sangallo the Younger drew a sketch of part of the bridge on the same sheet as the Arch of Augustus, also preserved in the Uffizi. Several other sketches date to the time of the bridge's 1681 restoration.

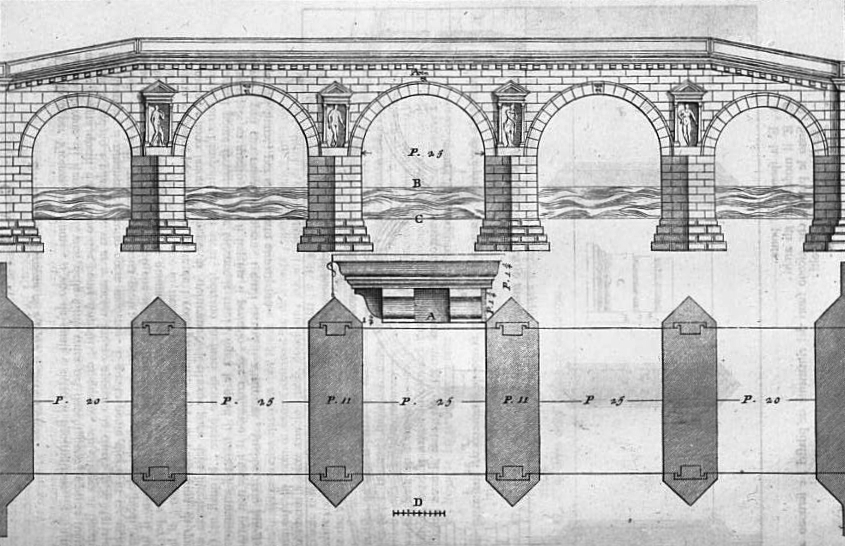
A sketch of the Ponte di Tiberio in Andrea Palladio's I quattro libri dell'architettura (1570)

Among the bridge's most notable studies is that of Andrea Palladio, who said that "of all the bridges that I have seen, [the Ponte di Tiberio] is the most beautiful and the most worthy of consideration (be it for its strength as for its layout)". Palladio likely visited the bridge during his journeys to Rome. Palladio's sketches and measurements in I quattro libri dell'architettura (1570) included corrections to regularise the bridge's measurements and improve its symmetry. Palladio discussed the bridge's empty aediculae, which he believed would once have housed statues. In 1715, Giacomo Leoni translated I quattro libri dell'architettura into English. Completed in 1766, Green's Bridge, a Neo-Palladian bridge over the River Nore in Kilkenny, Ireland, is a near-copy of the Ponte di Tiberio, designed by architect George Smith and inspired by Palladio's sketches in Leoni's translation.

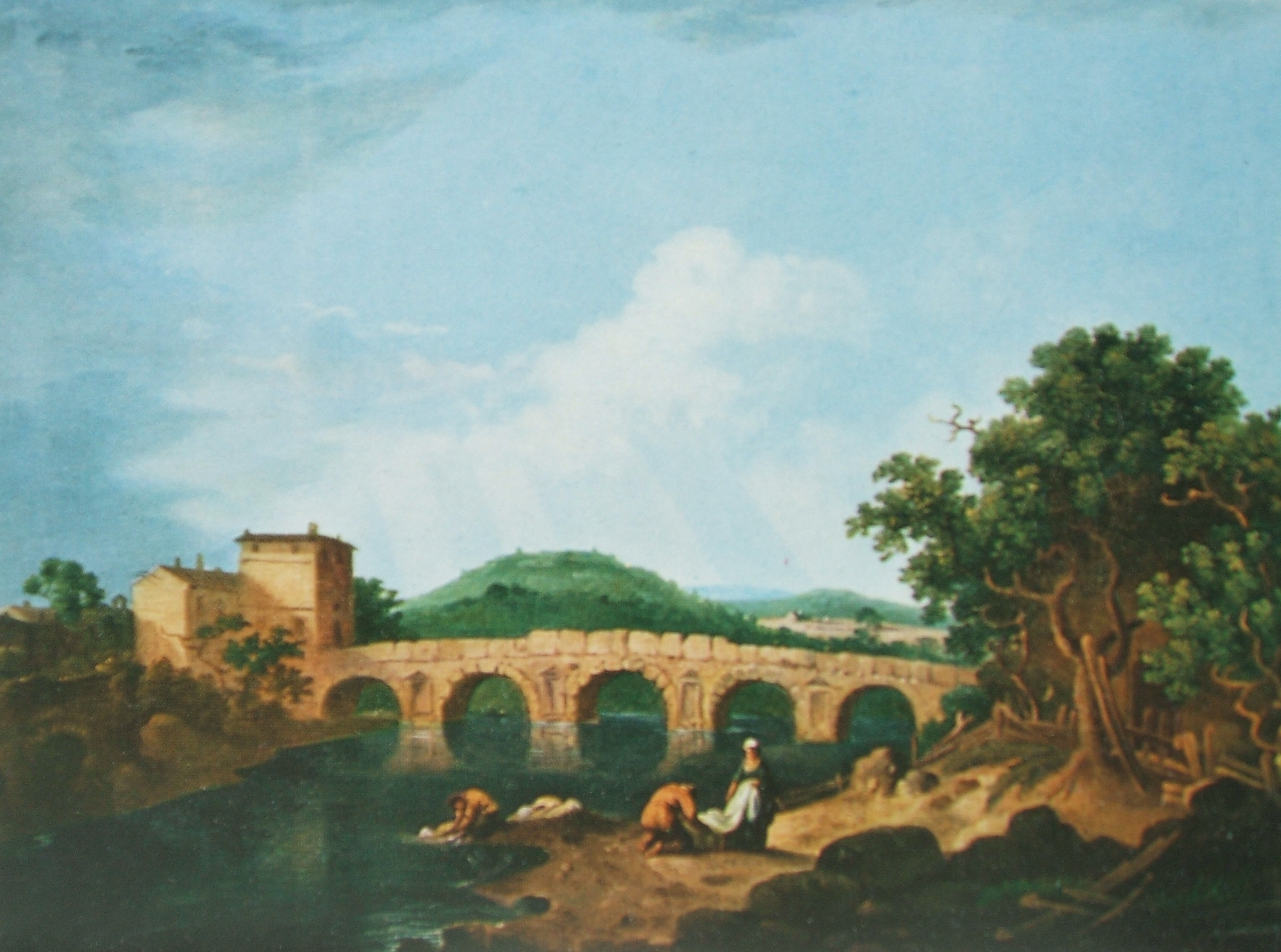
The Bridge of Augustus in Rimini (1750), a landscape painting by Richard Wilson

In 1748, Giovan Battista Piranesi sketched the most famous engraving of the bridge, which set the standard for future artistic depictions, in particular that the bridge would be viewed from downstream and outlined by foliage and bushes. Richard Wilson painted the bridge several times in the 18th century with different viewpoints, but the dominance of Piranesi's viewpoint would only change in the 19th century, during which the bridge began to be painted from the upstream side with the city church of Santa Maria dei Servi in the background. The oldest such published depiction is attributed to Robert Wallis on a design by Samuel Prout, printed in Thomas Roscoe's The Tourist in Switzerland and Italy (1830), though an unpublished sketch by Florent Fidèle Constant Bourgeois from 1806, illustrating Napoleon's campaigns in Italy, uses the same angle.

== See also ==
- List of Roman bridges
- Roman architecture
- Roman engineering
