= Green's Bridge =

Green's Bridge Green's Bridge
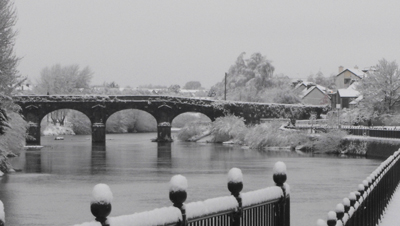
- Green's Bridge on the river Nore in 2010
- Coordinates: 52.6580457°N 7.2535254°W
- Crosses: River Nore
- Locale: Kilkenny, County Kilkenny, Ireland
- Official name: Green's Bridge
- Maintained by: Kilkenny County Council
- Heritage status: Protected Structure
- NIAH: Reg. No.12004007; KN-130
- Website: buildingsofireland.ie

Characteristics
- Design: Arch bridge/palladian-style
- Material: Limestone
- Trough construction: limestone
- Pier construction: limestone

History
- Architect: George Smith
- Constructed by: William Colles (c. 1710–1770)
- Construction start: 1765
- Construction cost: £2828
- Opened: 1766
- Replaces: Great Bridge of Kilkenny

Location
- Interactive map of Green's Bridge

Green's Bridge, or Greensbridge, is an elegant, Palladian-style, limestone arch bridge that crosses the river Nore in Kilkenny, Ireland. The bridge is a series of five elliptical arches of high-quality carved limestone masonry with a two-arch culvert to the east. Its graceful profile, architectural design value, and civil engineering heritage endow it with national significance. Historian Maurice Craig described it as one of the five-finest bridges in Ireland. It was built by William Colles and designed by George Smith, and was completed in 1766. The bridge was 250 years old in 2016.

The bridge's location on the north side of Kilkenny has been a ford since at least the middle of the 10th century. The first bridge there was built in the 12th century by settlers from Flanders and has been rebuilt many times due to frequent floods. The bridge itself is known from medieval times; it was described as "the Bridge of Kilkenny", "the big bridge of Kilkenny", and "Grines Bridge"; the origin of the name Green's Bridge, however, is uncertain. The "Great Flood of 1763" destroyed the previous bridge.

Green's Bridge was designed by George Smith and built by William Colles. Colles was the owner of a marble works and an inventor of machinery for sawing, boring, and polishing limestone. Smith designed an almost-true copy of the Bridge of Tiberius (Italian: Ponte di Augusto e Tiberio) in Rimini, Italy, as described by Andrea Palladio in I quattro libri dell'architettura (The Four Books of Architecture) (1570). Parapets were added during a renovation in 1835.

Temporary works to the bridge, which is currently used as a road bridge, carried out in 1969 have had a negative impact and the general appraisal is that it needs restoration. The estimated the cost of the bridge was £2,828.

== Background ==
At the centre of medieval Irish kingdom Osraige, Kilkenny grew from a monastic settlement—now St Canice's Cathedral on the hill above the bridge—to a thriving Norman merchant town in the Middle Ages. Below the hill was a slow-moving and relatively easily fordable point on the Nore that had used from at least the 10th century. Three important roads, including from Old Leighlin and Rosconnail (south of Ballyragget), forded the Rivers Nore and Bregagh.

Later the area was converted to a mill pond associated with the Augustinian Priory of St Johns and a new bridge was needed. Settlers from Flanders may have built the first bridge in the 12th century. The late medieval bridge has been recorded as "the Bridge of Kilkenny" in c. 1178 and "the big bridge of Kilkenny" in c. 1223. It was described as "Grines Bridge" in 1623. the origin of the name "Green's Bridge" is unknown; a Greene family "acquired the land in this area on October 21, 1631", however, merchant John Rothe of Rothe House in his will of 1619 bequeathed to his son John, "All my messauges in the Greene Street of the Irishtowne".

The bridge has been rebuilt many times due to frequent floods, including the great floods of 1338, c. 1443, and 1526. Sir James Ware the historian mentions the Bishop of Ossory Oliver Cantwell O.P. rebuilding "the great bridge of Kilkenny, thrown down by an inundation about the year 1447". By 1623 the bridge was in a '"decayed state"'; Kilkenny Archaeological Society has two unnamed depictions from 1655 and 1708. It was recorded as 'out of repair' in 1710 and the earlier late-medieval bridge is recorded on Rocques' 1758 map.

An archaeological excavation of part of the structure was carried out as part of the Kilkenny Flood Relief scheme. One arch of the former bridge spans the Greensbridge mill‐race to the east; four or five of its central pier abutments are visible in low water.

== Great Flood of 1763 ==
The Great Flood of 1763 on 2 October washed away Green's Bridge. John's Bridge, the city's other main bridge, was also destroyed. The current Green's Bridge was rebuilt one hundred and twenty meters (390 ft) to the south. The Bishop of Ossory Richard Pococke estimated the cost of the loss of the bridge to be £2,828, and the cost of the cleanup from the flood at £11,381. The Parliament of Ireland granted £5417 for the rebuilding of Green's Bridge and John's Bridge. Neighbouring churches collected £273, the lord lieutenant Earl of Northumberland gave £200, and the rest, £4967, was collected in taxes in the county.

== Design ==
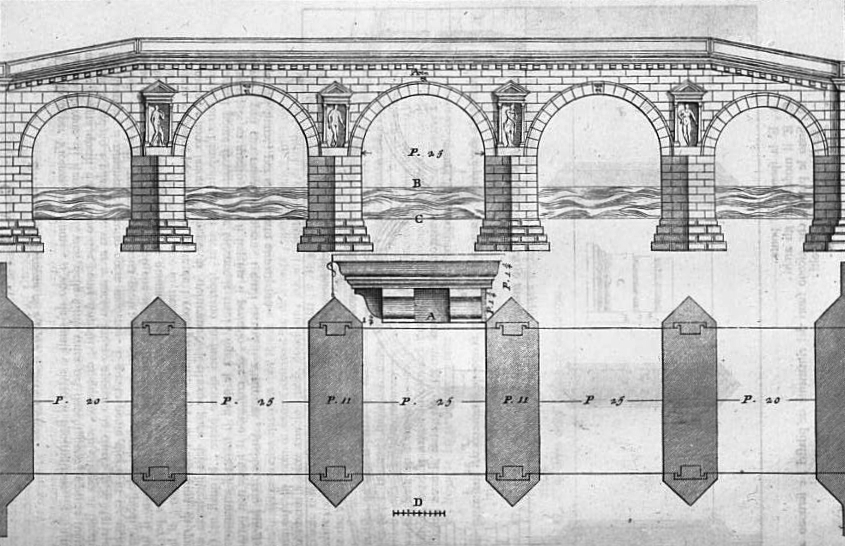
Andrea Palladio's drawing of 'Ponte di Augusto e Tiberio' in Rimini

The Nore navigation engineer George Smith from Kilkenny was appointed to design the new bridge. Smith had worked under George Semple during the building of Essex Bridge (now Grattan Bridge) in Dublin. Within three years of the Blackfriars Bridge competition, Smith had three notable stone bridge designs in County Kilkenny. At Inistioge Bridge (1763), the nearest bridge to the mouth of the Nore, Smith used a design derived from Robert Mylne's design for Blackfriars Bridge. In Kilkenny, Smith also designed the replacement for John's Bridge.

For Green's Bridge, Smith designed an almost-exact copy of Bridge of Tiberius (Italian: Ponte di Augusto e Tiberio) in Rimini, Italy, as described by Andrea Palladio's (1508–1580) in I Quattro Libri dell'Architettura (1570) (The Four Books of Architecture). Smith's design, which was built with rubble limestone, incorporated five elliptical arches with cut-limestone Gibbs surrounds and dressed squared limestone soffits. With three central arches and two smaller arches it is decorated with pedimented aedicules and doric columns. It has tooled limestone ashlar triangular cut-waters. In 1835, the bridge was renovated with two random rubble limestone parapets with coping. As well as the five arches there is also a pair of elliptical arches over a culvert, one of which has been blocked with concrete.

The bridge was temporally remodelled in 1969, when the missing parapet on the north (upstream) facade of the bridge was removed and a cantilevered steel walkway and services were added. These alteration works had a negative impact on the composition of the bridge.

== Construction ==
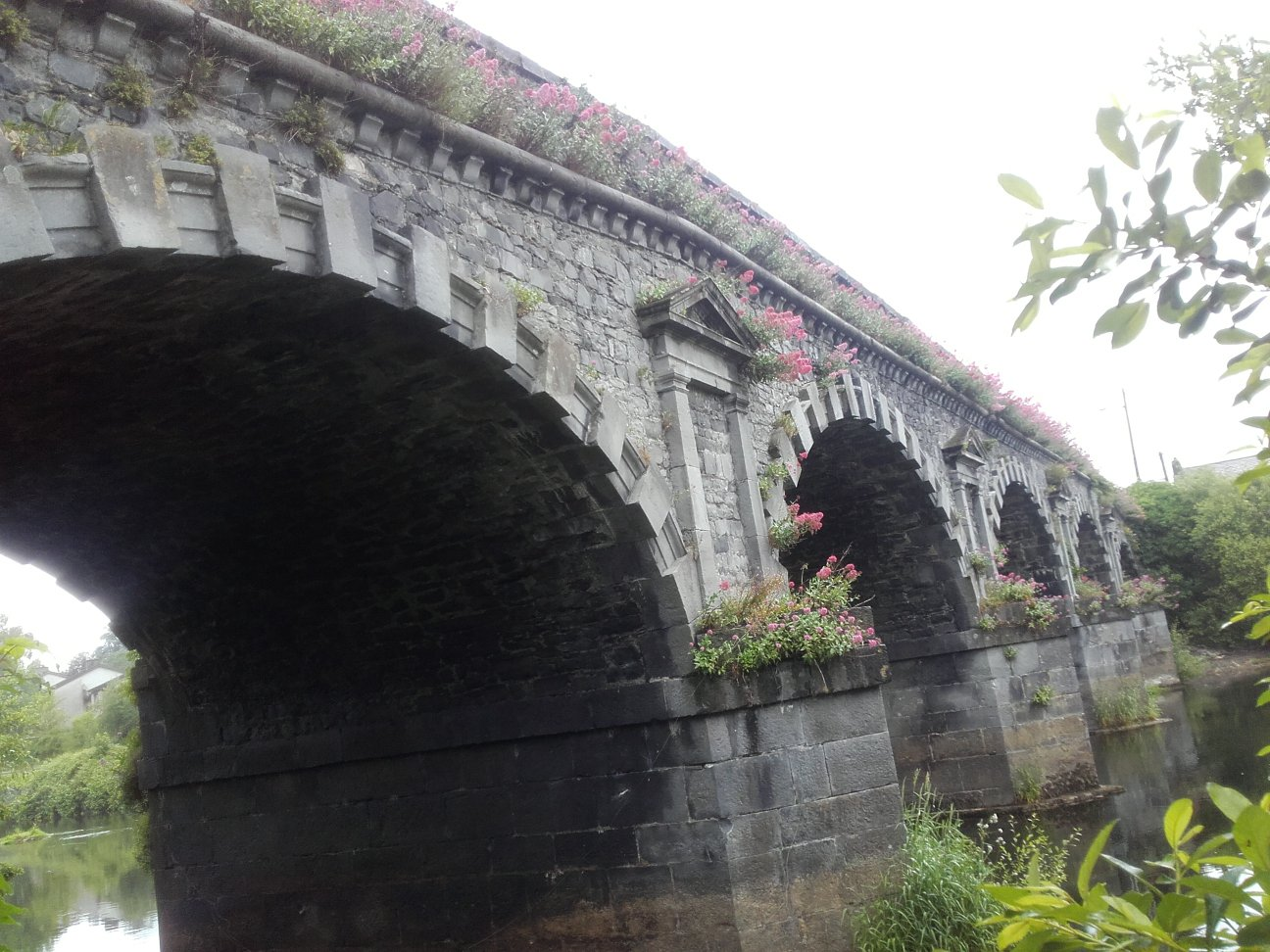
Green's Bridge in flower.

The task of building the bridge went to William Colles (30 August 1702 – 8 March 1770), a building contractor and entrepreneur from Kilkenny who owned a marble works at Millmount about 1.9 miles (3 km) downstream of Kilkenny and Archersgrove Quarry on the outskirts of the city. Archersgrove Quarry produced Kilkenny marble, a fine-grained Lower Carboniferous limestone (Butlersgrove Formation); it has become known as the Black Quarry due to the colour of the final product.

Colles is credited as the inventor of machinery for sawing, boring and polishing limestone using water mills; tasks that had previously been performed by hand. A weir on the river provided water to drive reciprocating cross-cut steel band saws using sand as an abrasive, to cut the larger blocks. The River Nore was used to transport large blocks from the quarry by means of horse-drawn floats and/or barges.

== Bridge complex ==
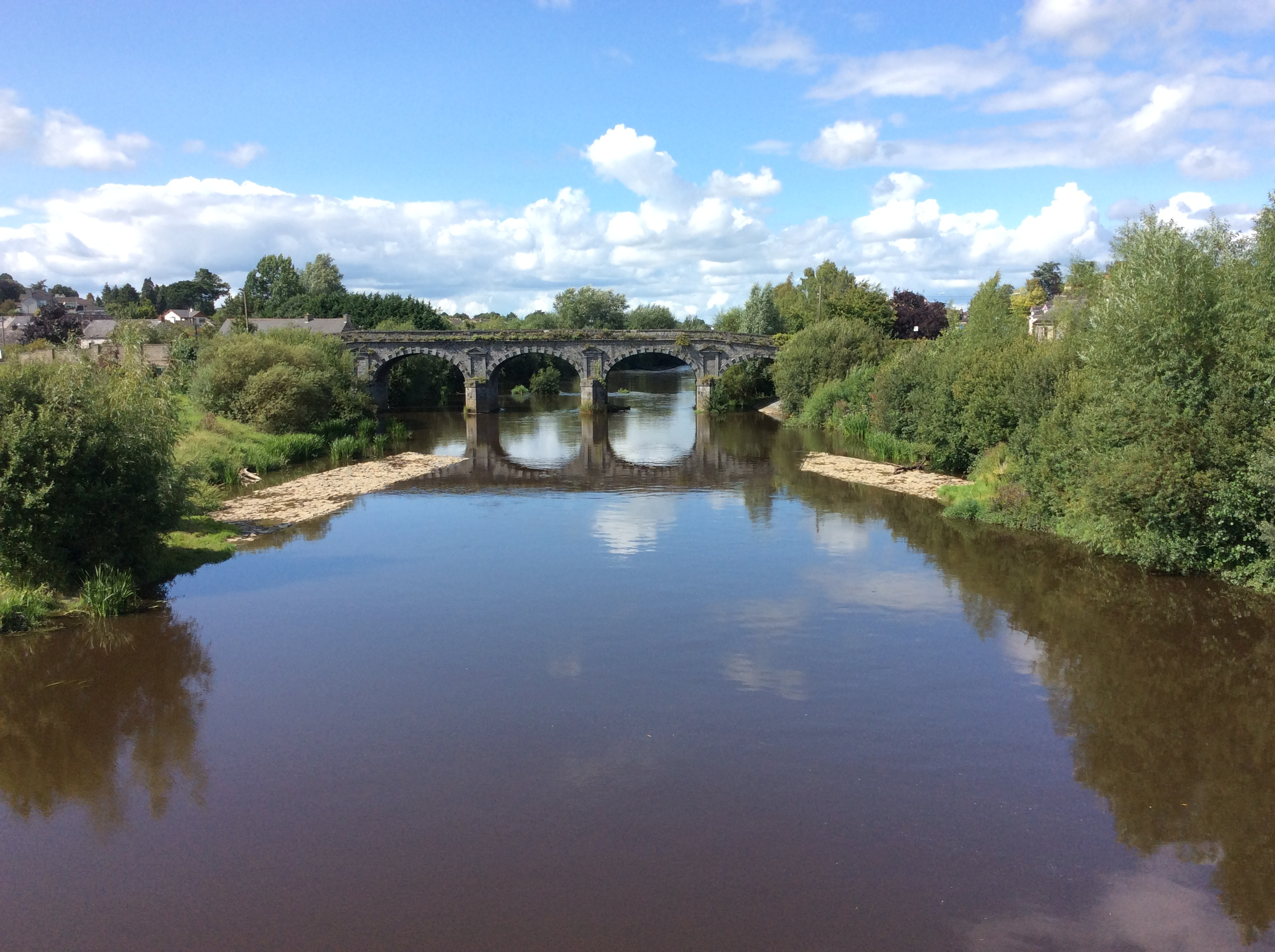
Green's Bridge

Green's Bridge complex also includes a late medieval bridge, a medieval mill stream, and a watermill. Between the current bridge and the late medieval bridge, a watermill is depicted on Rocques' 1758 map, and the Civil Survey also describes a watermill "standing upon Grene's Bridge".

As part of the Kilkenny Flood Relief Scheme, an archaeological examination of the late medieval bridge was undertaken. This revealed two piers, two sections of collapsed masonry, and a bridge abutment from the 16th century bridge. A post‐medieval mill building with associated river bank revetment walls were also found. A small section of the millstream was re‐opened at Greensbridge mill during the archaeological examination.

The medieval millstream was a part of the medieval watermill at Green's Bridge and for the Maudlin mills; evidence suggests it was constructed in the 12th century and associated with the Augustinian Priory of St Johns. It ran along the eastern bank of the River Nore from an inlet at Friar's Inch, under Noremount, and re-entered below Green's Bridge.

A lower section flowed as far as the Maudlin mills to the south. Included on Rocque's 1758 map and the First Edition Ordnance Survey Map, of the 0.68 miles (1.1 km) of millstream, much of the upper section can still be seen. Most of the town section, however, has been filled in and built upon. In John Street, much of the mill‐stream was walled and was crossed by the "Little Bridge".

== See also ==
- List of bridges in the Republic of Ireland
- History of Kilkenny
- Roman architecture
