= Acephalous =

Acephalous (Greek: "without a head") may refer to:

- Acephalous society
- Acephalous line
- Acephali
