= Kilkenny marble =

Carboniferous limestone found in County Kilkenny, Ireland

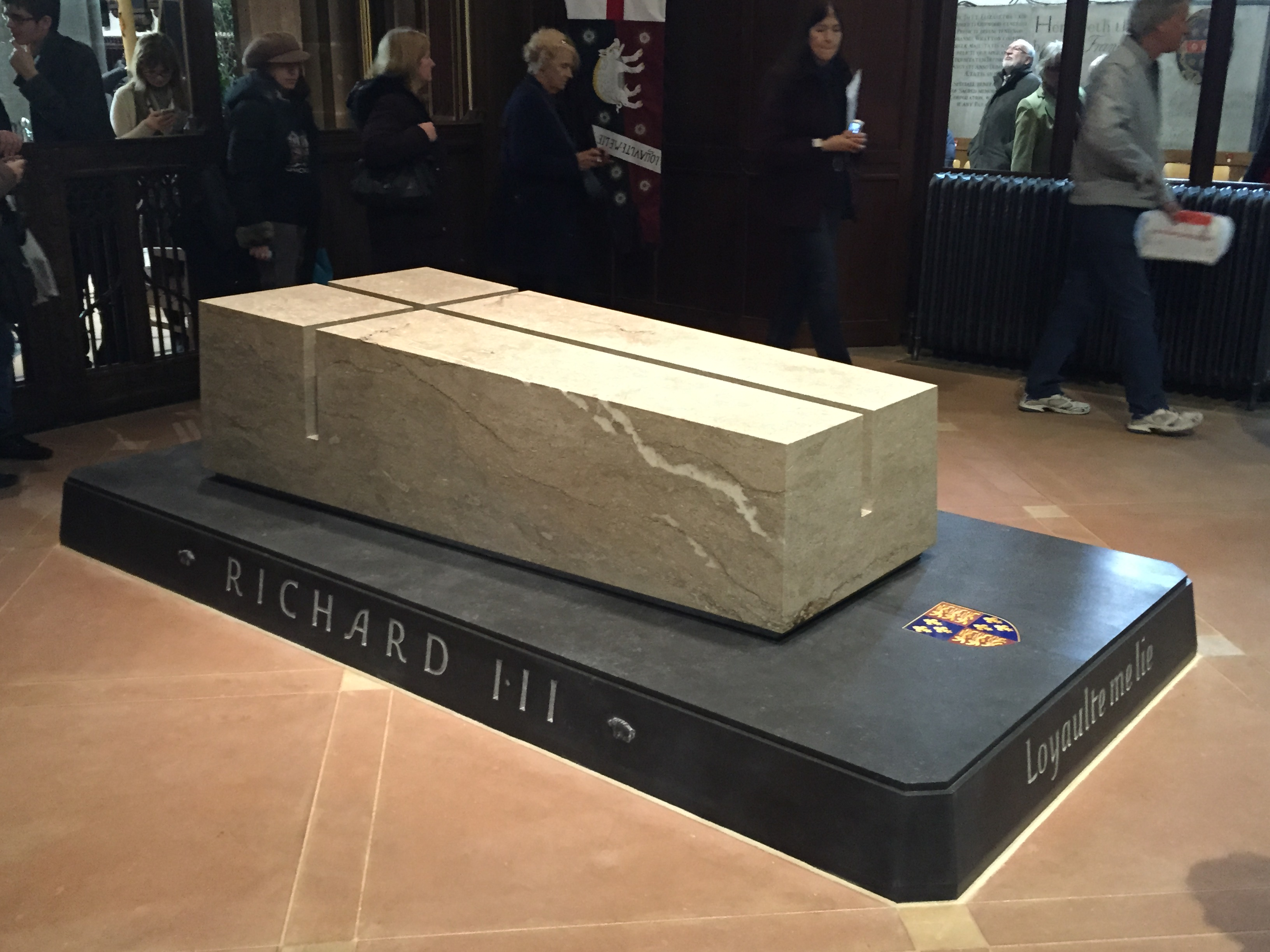
Richard III's tomb, of Swaledale white limestone on a Kilkenny black marble plinth

Kilkenny marble or Kilkenny black marble is a fine-grained very dark grey carboniferous limestone found around County Kilkenny in Ireland in the "Butlersgrove Formation", a Lower Carboniferous limestone that contains fossils of brachiopods, gastropods, crinoids and corals. The first and main source was the "Black Quarry" in the townlands of Archersgrove and Gallowshill just south of Kilkenny city, which was used from the 17th to the 19th century. Kilkenny is nicknamed "the Marble City"; the footpaths of the city streets were paved with Kilkenny marble flagstones, which were highly polished with wear and glistened when wet.

== Quarrying ==
Large rough-hewn blocks were transported from the Black Quarry on horse-drawn drays the short distance to the River Nore, then onto small river floats or barges and brought about 3 kilometres (1.9 mi) down-river to Milmount where it was worked. A weir on the river provided water to drive reciprocating cross-cut saws to cut the larger blocks into the finished shapes required for the market. The saws were actually steel bands, about four metres long. Sand was used as an abrasive cutting agent. Water levels were kept low by two steel 30-centimetre-diameter (12 in) reciprocating pumps, probably driven by steam. A lime kiln was located close by which produced lime from the stone chips and off-cuts. Coal, probably from Castlecomer, 12 kilometres (7.5 mi) north of Kilkenny, layered with stone and set to smoulder, produced white chunks of lime, which, when powdered was used as an agricultural fertilizer. The quarry was owned by the Colles family, a famous member being physician Abraham Colles. From the top of the Black Quarry, Cromwell's forces in 1650 are said to have positioned cannon and fired on the city.

Produce from other quarries of Butlersgrove Formation stone continue to be marketed as "Kilkenny black marble" when polished, including Bannagagole Quarry near Oldleighlin, County Carlow.

== Uses ==
As well as in several local buildings, including Green's Bridge, Kilkenny marble was used in Cobh Cathedral and Bowen's Court in County Cork; Lissadell House, County Sligo; the headstone of Daniel O'Connell in Glasnevin Cemetery, Dublin; the altar of St Patrick's Church, Belfast; and the plinth of the 2015 tomb of Richard III of England in Leicester Cathedral. In 1878, Bishop Thomas Francis Hendricken, a native of Kilkenny, and 1st Bishop of Providence, Rhode Island USA, laid a large block of Kilkenny marble as the cornerstone of his new cathedral, Cathedral of Saints Peter and Paul (Providence, Rhode Island).
