= Bobby Wallace =

Bob or Bobby Wallace may refer to:

- Bobby Wallace (American football) (born 1954), college football coach at the University of North Alabama
- Bobby Wallace (baseball) (1873–1960), Baseball Hall of Fame member
- Bobby Wallace (footballer) (1908–1991), Scottish footballer with Hamilton Academical and Dumbarton
- Bob Wallace (computer scientist) (1949–2002), early Microsoft employee
- Bob Wallace (footballer, born 1893) (1893–1970), Scottish footballer (Nottingham Forest)
- Bob Wallace (footballer, born 1948), English footballer
- Bob Wallace (American football) (born 1945), former American football wide receiver and tight end
- Bob Wallace (test driver) (1938–2013), racing driver from New Zealand who was instrumental in the founding of automaker Lamborghini
- Bob Wallace (runner) (1951–2020), Australian marathon runner

== See also ==
- Robert Wallace (disambiguation)
- Bob Wallis (1934–1991), British jazz musician
