= Saint Jerome in the Desert (Bellini, Florence) =

Painting by Giovanni Bellini

San Girolamo Contini Bonacossi
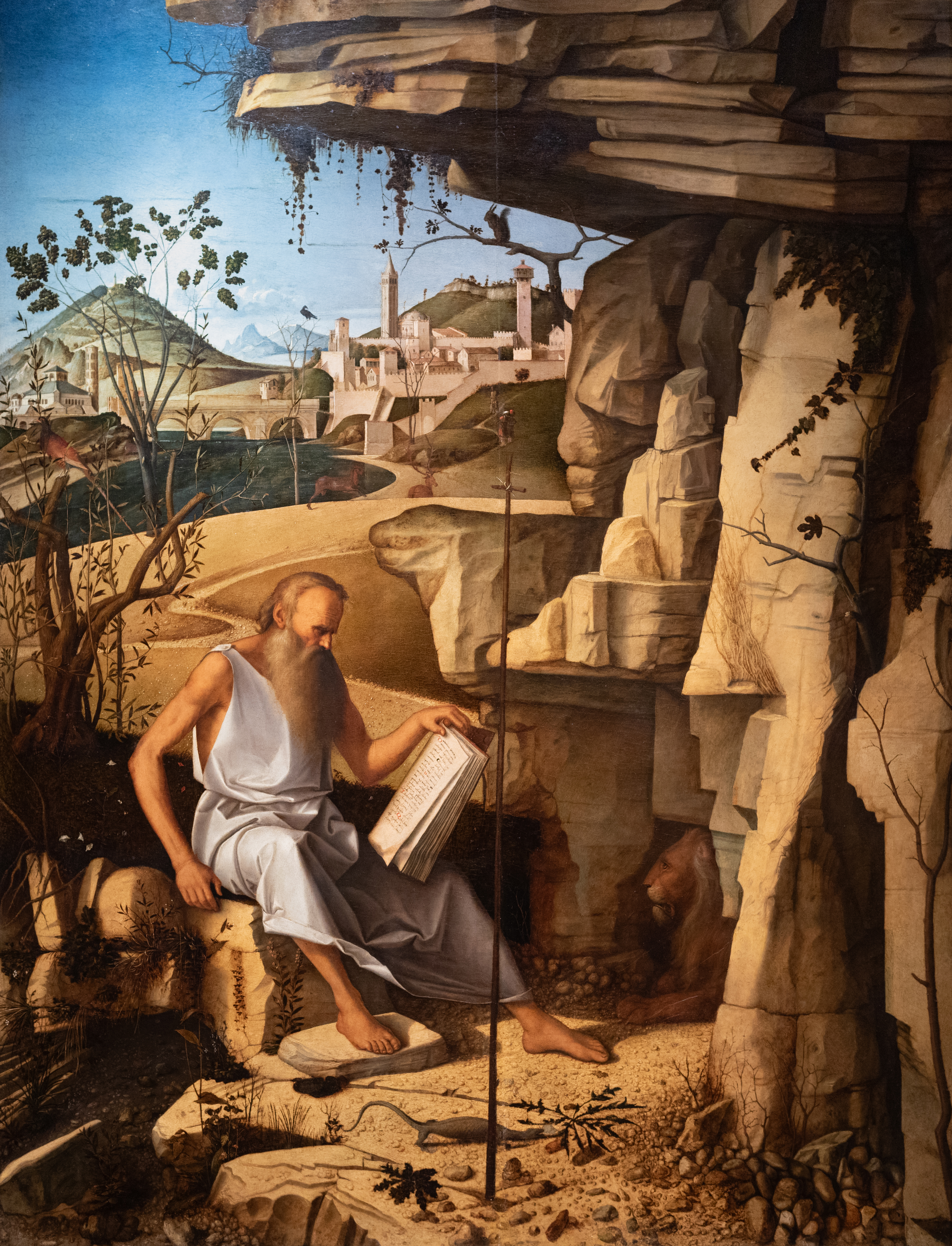
- Artist: Giovanni Bellini
- Year: 1480
- Medium: oil on panel
- Dimensions: 145 cm × 114 cm (57 in × 45 in)
- Location: Uffizi Gallery, Florence

Saint Jerome in the Desert, or Saint Jerome Reading in the Desert, is an oil painting on panel of 1480 by the Italian Renaissance master Giovanni Bellini, now in the Uffizi Gallery in Florence as part of the Contini Bonacossi collection, giving it its alternative title of the Contini Bonacossi Saint Jerome.

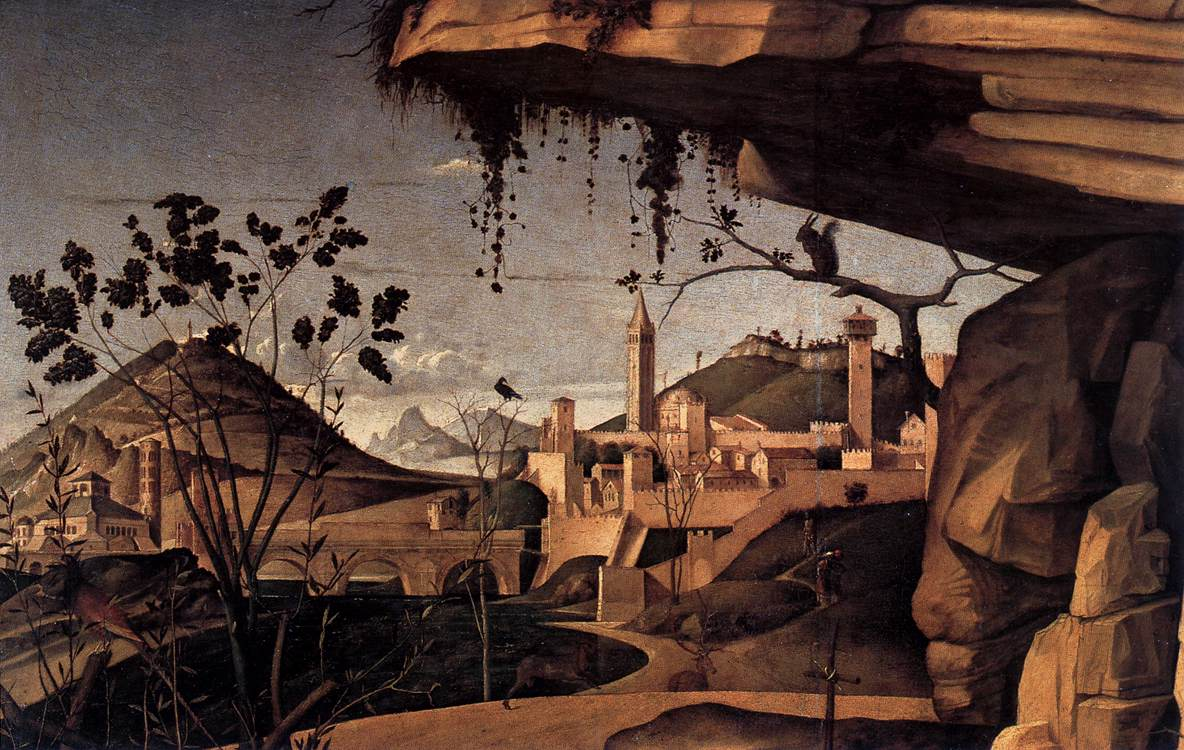
Background

Its original location is unknown, though Gamba's theory is that it was an altarpiece for Santa Maria dei Miracoli, Venice, where Jacopo Sansovino mentioned seeing a Saint Jerome by Bellini completed in 1489. It uses the same composition as another Saint Jerome in the Desert, controversially dated to around 1505. In both works Saint Jerome is shown reading in the desert, referring to both his life as a hermit and his production of the Vulgate Bible.

The work in Florence shows a crucifix on a long shaft, which the saint used as an aid to prayer. His usual lion is shown, as are some birds, a lizard, a squirrel on a branch and one deer chasing another, all of which probably had symbolic meanings. At the top is a rural background with a fortress and a walled city teeming with guard towers and bell towers, along with other buildings based on famous buildings in Romagna and the Venetian contado which Bellini had seen on his journey to Romagna and the Marche. The central building resembles the Basilica of San Vitale in Ravenna, while others are based on the Ponte di Tiberio in Rimini, the bell-tower of Sant'Anastasia in Verona, and the Mausoleum of Theoderic in Ravenna. This marked the beginning of a new conception of landscape painting, connected to the predella of the Pesaro Altarpiece or the New York Saint Francis in Ecstasy, whose figures and background are lighter and whose atmosphere is freer than in earlier works.

== See also ==
- List of works by Giovanni Bellini
