= Saint Jerome in the Desert (Bellini, Washington) =

Painting by Giovanni Bellini in the National Gallery of Art, Washington

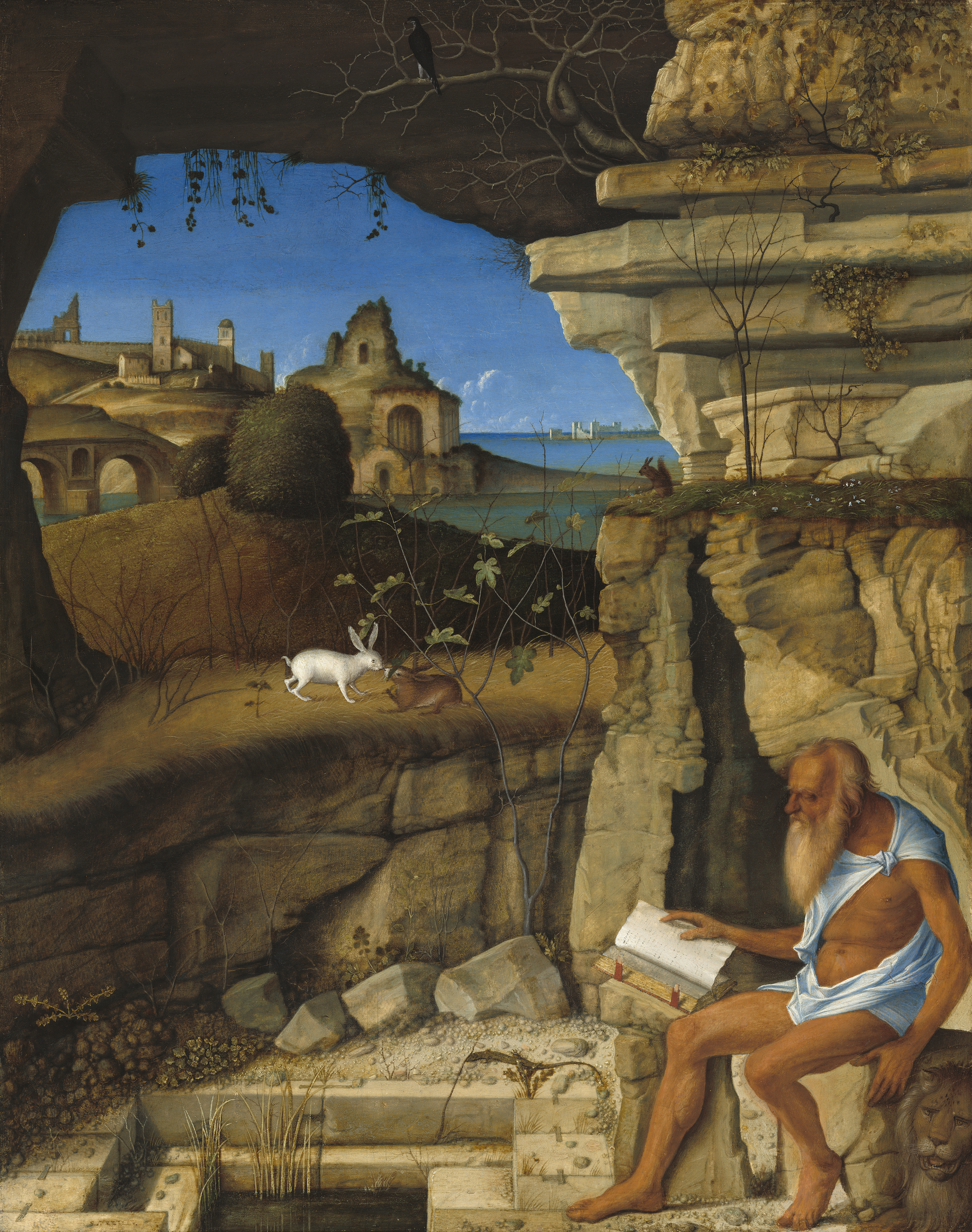
- Artist: Giovanni Bellini
- Year: 1505
- Medium: oil on canvas
- Dimensions: 49 cm × 39 cm (19 in × 15 in)
- Location: National Gallery of Art, Washington, D.C.

Saint Jerome in the Desert is an oil painting on canvas of 1505 by the Italian Renaissance master Giovanni Bellini, now in the National Gallery of Art in Washington, D.C. Little remains of the signature on the first rock in the left foreground, but it has been confirmed as genuine during restoration and can be reconstructed as "[Johannes Bellinu]s. 1505". This is problematic, since the work's general style is linked to fashions no later than 1490, whereas Bellini's style of figures and landscapes had already begun to be influenced by Giorgione by 1500, with the backgrounds more fused and unified in terms of atmosphere. The composition makes it more analogous to his earlier works, such as the Saint Jerome in the Desert of c. 1480 in the Uffizi. The Washington work may have been a collaboration, a work completed by a pupil in Bellini's studio, or left incomplete and only finished by Bellini himself much later.

Saint Jerome is shown reading in the desert, referring to his life as a hermit and as the author of the Vulgate Bible. A lizard, a squirrel and hare appear among the rocks, while in the distance are a ruined Roman bridge and series of arches along with a walled city. In the center background is another city on an island or peninsula in the sea. The fig tree, bare tree and crumbled rocks are all theological symbols. The upper left part of the ruins and other more stiffly painted parts of the background were probably produced by Bellini's studio.

== See also ==
- List of works by Giovanni Bellini
