= Acephalous line =

An acephalous or headless line is a variety of catalectic line in a poem which does not conform to its accepted metre, due to the first syllable's omission. Acephalous lines are usually deliberate variations in scansion, but this is not always obvious.

Robert Wallace argues in his essay "Meter in English" that the term acephalous line seems "pejorative", as if criticising the poet's violation of scansion, but this view is not widely held among critics.

Acephalous lines are common in anapestic metre, especially in limericks.

There was an old man of Tobago,
Who lived on rice, gruel, and sago,
Till, much to his bliss,
His physician said this -
"To a leg, sir, of mutton you may go."

(Anonymous)

The third line is scanned x ' x x ' instead of x x ' x x '.
