= Maudlin Castle =

Tower house located in Kilkenny, Ireland

Magdalan Castle
- Caisleán Mhaidilín (Irish)
- Magdalen Castle
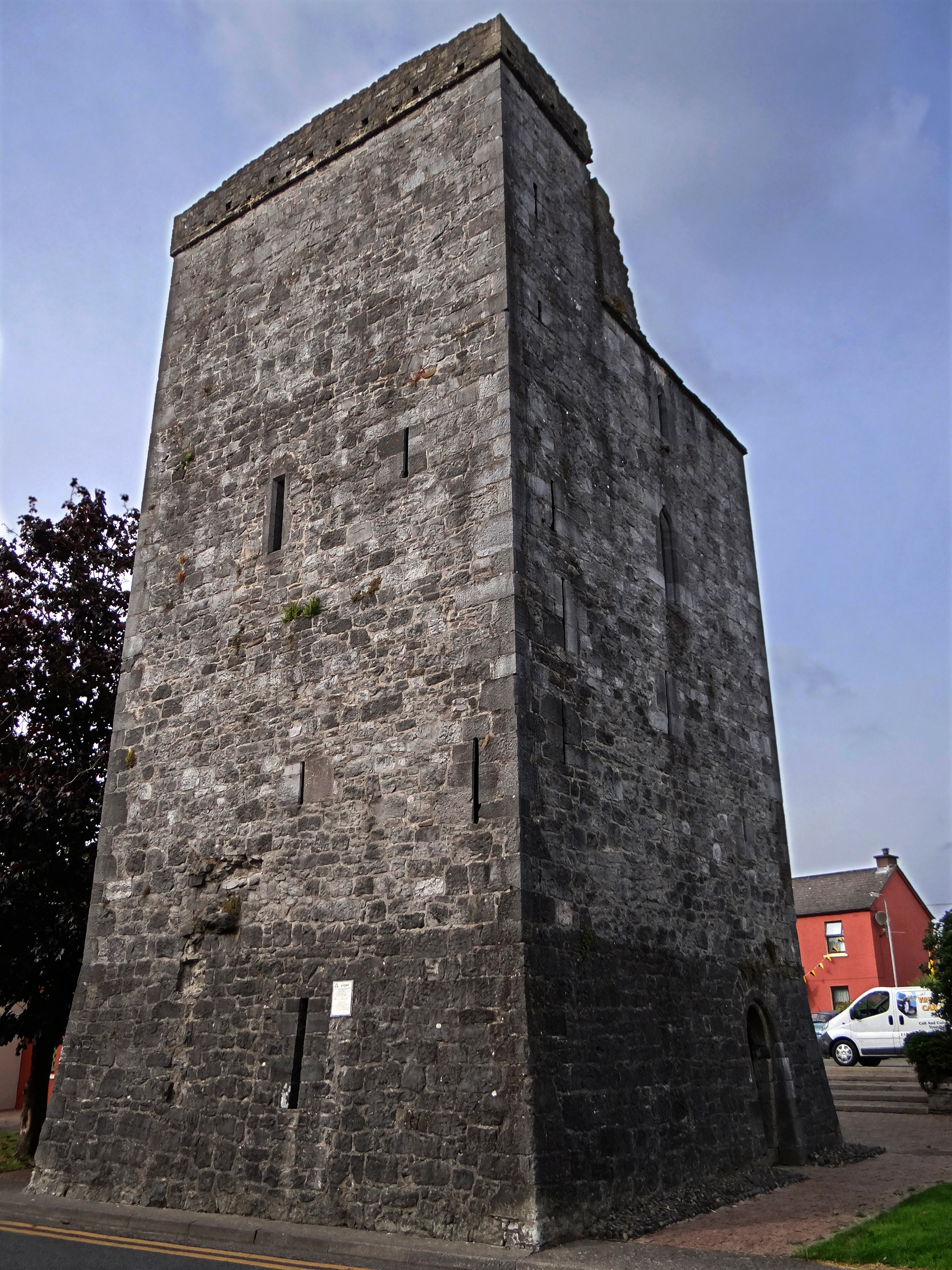

- Location within Ireland
- 52.652646°N 7.244695°W
- Type: tower house
- Location: Maudlin Street, Kilkenny, County Kilkenny, Ireland

History
- Built: 16th century

Site notes
- Height: 25 m (82 ft)
- Area: Nore Valley

National monument of Ireland
- Official name: Magdalan Castle
- Reference no.: 522

Maudlin Castle is a tower house which formed part of a medieval hospital and National Monument located in Kilkenny, Ireland.

== Location ==
Maudlin Castle is located on Maudlin Street, Kilkenny City, just north of the Nore and to the east of Kilkenny College.

== History ==
Leprosy arrived in Ireland in the 10th or 11th century. Many leper houses were dedicated to Mary Magdalene because of the association between her and sexual excess and prostitution, which were incorrectly associated with leprosy.

The Hospital of St. Mary Magdalene in Kilkenny was opened sometime before 1327 (perhaps by William Marshal, 1st Earl of Pembroke in the early 13th century) and it quickly became one of the main leper houses in medieval Ireland. It was on the edge of the city and surrounded by high walls. The entrance was controlled through a gatehouse. It also had a chapel, graveyard and 50 acres of farmland. This hospital had a long association with St. John's Priory, Kilkenny.

The surviving tower house was built in the early 16th century. The hospital was dissolved in the Dissolution of the Monasteries. Maudlin Castle was described as ‘a small castle roofed with tiles, which was built for the defence of the lepers and dwellers in the suburbs, this is now empty and worth nothing’. There is a reference in 1628 to a ‘town ditch’ near St. Mary's Church, so there may have been a moat beyond the gate. The hospital was gifted to Kilkenny Corporation by Charles I.

The hospital also served as a "retirement home" for rich families like the Rothes, Langtons and Shees. Archaeological digs on the street indicate a diet of beef, mutton, bacon and wildfowl.

== Building ==
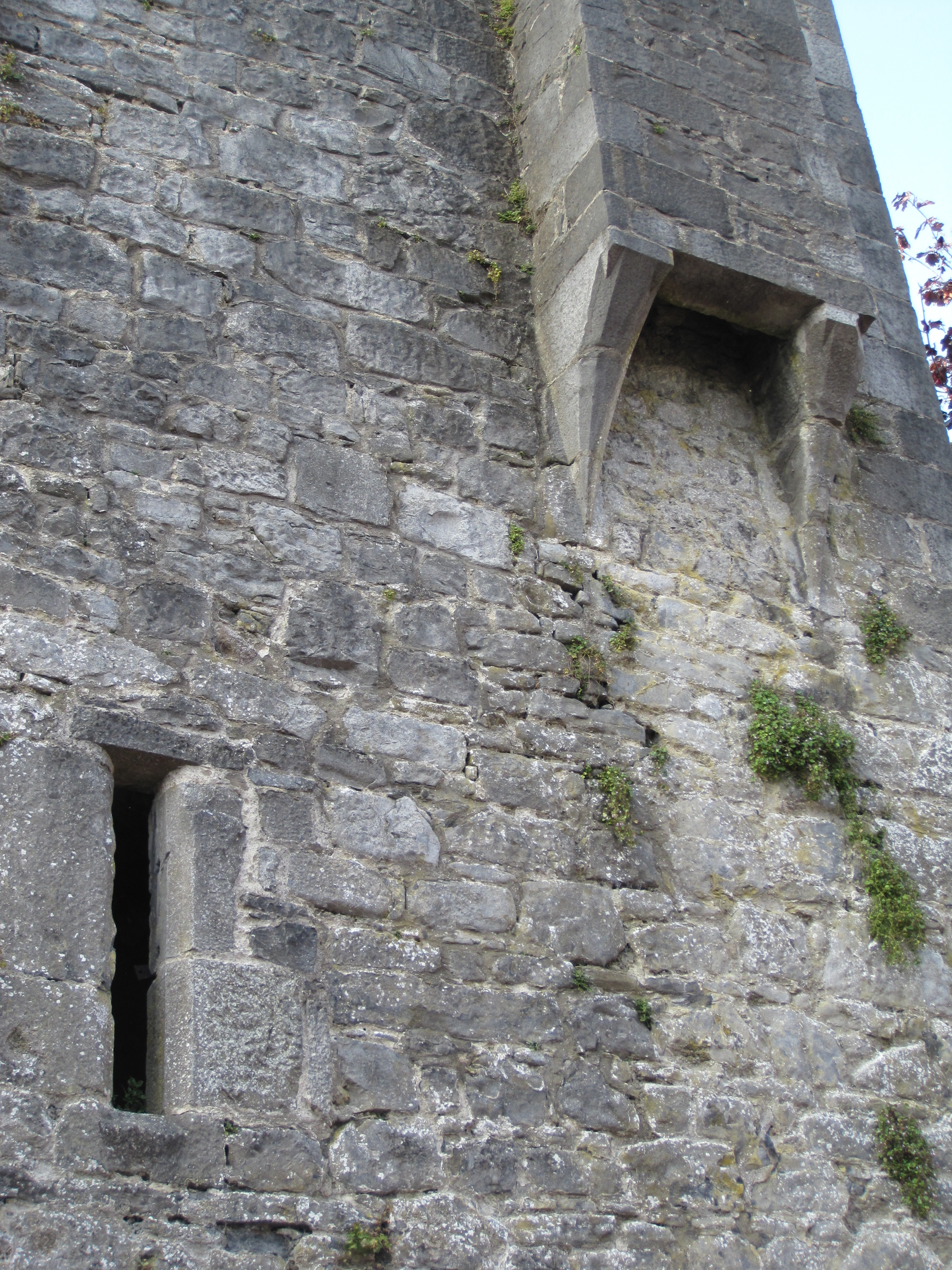
Garderobe and arrowslit

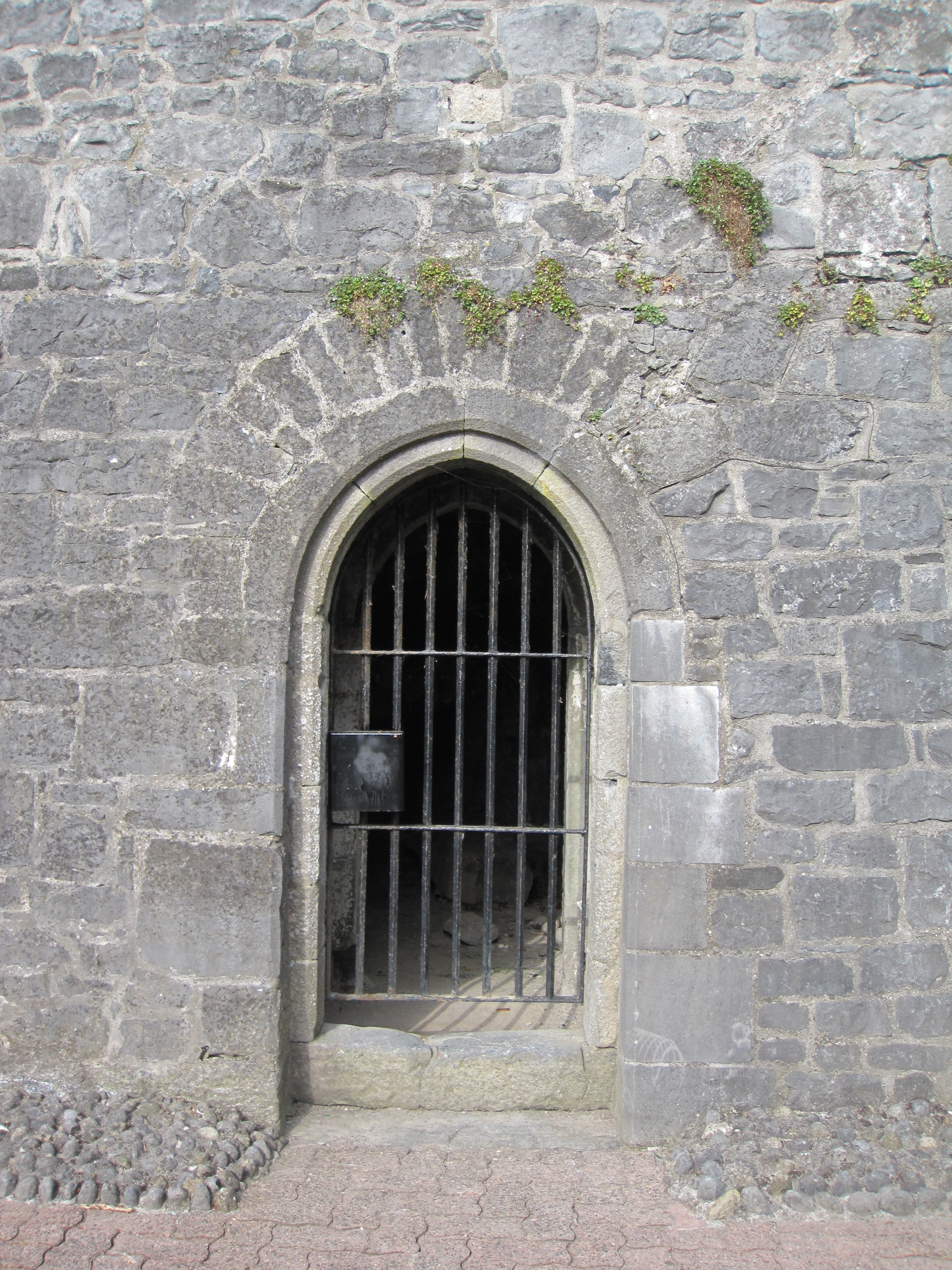
Arched doorway

The tower is 25 m (82 ft) and four storeys high, with a stair turret continuing up to the battlements. The base has a pronounced batter.
