= Robert Wallace (footballer) =

Scottish footballer

Personal information
- Date of birth: 1905
- Place of birth: Paisley, Scotland
- Height: 5 ft 6 in (1.68 m)
- Position: Inside forward

Senior career*
Years	Team	Apps	(Gls)
1926–1927	Cambuslang Rangers		
1927–1928	Cowdenbeath	6	(1)
1928–1929	Sunderland	5	(0)
1929–1931	Third Lanark	28	(8)
1931–1932	Bo'ness		
1932	Raleigh Athletic		
- * Club domestic league appearances and goals

Robert Wallace (born 1905) was a Scottish professional footballer who played as an inside forward for Cowdenbeath, Sunderland and Third Lanark.
