= Robert B. Wallace =

American politician

Robert B. Wallace (c. 1869 – June 3, 1928) was an American politician from New York.

== Life ==
Wallace was born in around 1869.

Wallace was manager of the Van Dyke Tea Company, Harlem branch. During World War I, he was an active worker in the American Red Cross and the Liberty Loan campaigns. In 1919, he was elected to the New York State Assembly as a Republican, representing the New York County 13th District. He served in the Assembly in 1920 and 1921. He later became chief clerk of the Collector of Internal Revenue for the First District.

Wallace died from pneumonia at his summer home in City Island on June 3, 1928. He had a wife named Emma and a daughter.

New York State Assembly
Preceded by John J. Cronin	New York State Assembly; New York County, 13th District; 1920–1921	Succeeded by John P. Nugent
