= Robert M. Wallace (professor) =

American professor

Robert M. Wallace is a professor of material science and engineering and Erik Jonsson distinguished chair at the University of Texas at Dallas.

== Life and work ==
=== Selected publications ===
- Wilk, G. D.; Wallace, R. M.; Anthony, J. M. (2001). "High-κ gate dielectrics: Current status and materials properties considerations". Journal of Applied Physics. 89 (10): 5243–5275. Bibcode:2001JAP....89.5243W. doi:10.1063/1.1361065.
