= Robert M. Wallace (judge) =

American judge (1847–1914)

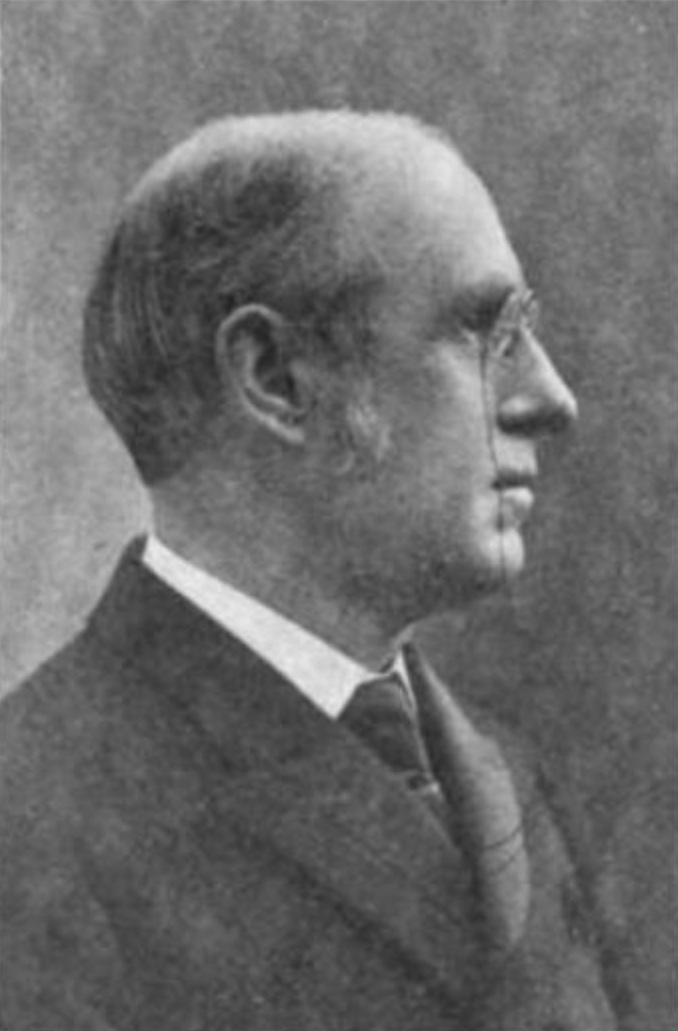
Justice Robert M. Wallace

Robert Moore Wallace (May 2, 1847 – April 5, 1914) was a New Hampshire lawyer and judge who served as an associate justice of the New Hampshire Supreme Court from 1893 to 1901, and chief justice of the New Hampshire Superior Court from 1901 to 1913.

== Early life, education, and career ==
Wallace was born in Henniker, New Hampshire, to Jonas and Mary (Darling) Wallace. Jonas Wallace was a prominent merchant in Henniker of Scotch-Irish descent.

Wallace prepared for college at the Academy in Henniker, entered Dartmouth College at the age of sixteen and graduated with honors in the class of 1867, after which he began reading law in the office of Col. Mason W. Tappan of Bradford, New Hampshire, then an ex-congressman, and later Attorney-General of the state. Wallace gained admission to the bar in 1870, and commenced the practice of law in Milford the following year, where he continued through life, for some years in association with Bainbridge Wadleigh.

== Political and judicial service ==
Wallace represented Milford in the New Hampshire House of Representatives in 1877 and 1878, having been nominated as a Republican in March 1877, and was a delegate to the Constitutional Convention of 1889. He was also Solicitor for Hillsborough County, New Hampshire, serving from 1883 until his appointment in 1893 as an associate justice of the state supreme court by Governor John Butler Smith, which position he held until the reorganization of the judiciary in 1901, when he became chief justice of the superior court. He was also Judge Advocate General on the staff of Governor Smith during the two years of his term.

From 1906 to 1911, he was a member of the board of trustees of Dartmouth College.

Wallace was chief justice of the Superior Court of New Hampshire for twelve years, from its creation in 1901 until November 1, 1913, when he resigned on account of continued ill health.

== Personal life and death ==
On August 25, 1874, Wallace married Ella M. Hutchinson, with whom he had two sons and a daughter. Wallace died at his home in Milford, New Hampshire, at the age of 66, following several months of poor health.

Political offices
Preceded by William H. H. Allen	Justice of the New Hampshire Supreme Court; 1893–1901	Succeeded by Court reorganized
