= Robert Wallis (engraver) =

English engraver (1794–1878)

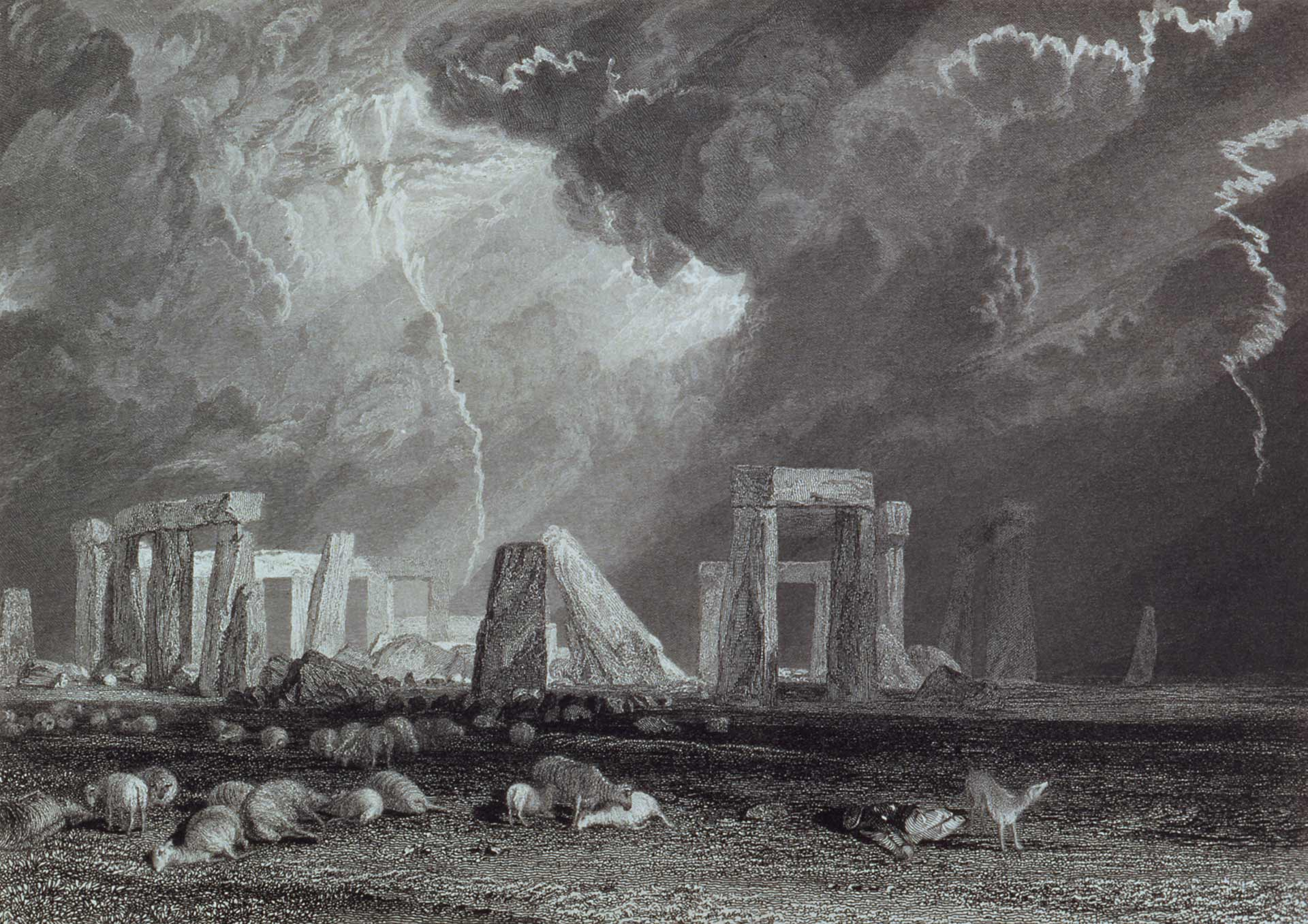
Stonehenge, 1829, after Turner

Robert William Wallis (7 November 1794 – 23 November 1878) was an English engraver.

== Life and work ==
Wallis born in London, the son of Thomas Wallis, who was an assistant of Charles Heath (1785–1848) and died in 1839. He was taught by his father, and became one of the ablest of the group of supremely skilful landscape-engravers who flourished during the second quarter of the nineteenth century, particularly excelling in the interpretation of the work of Joseph Mallord William Turner.

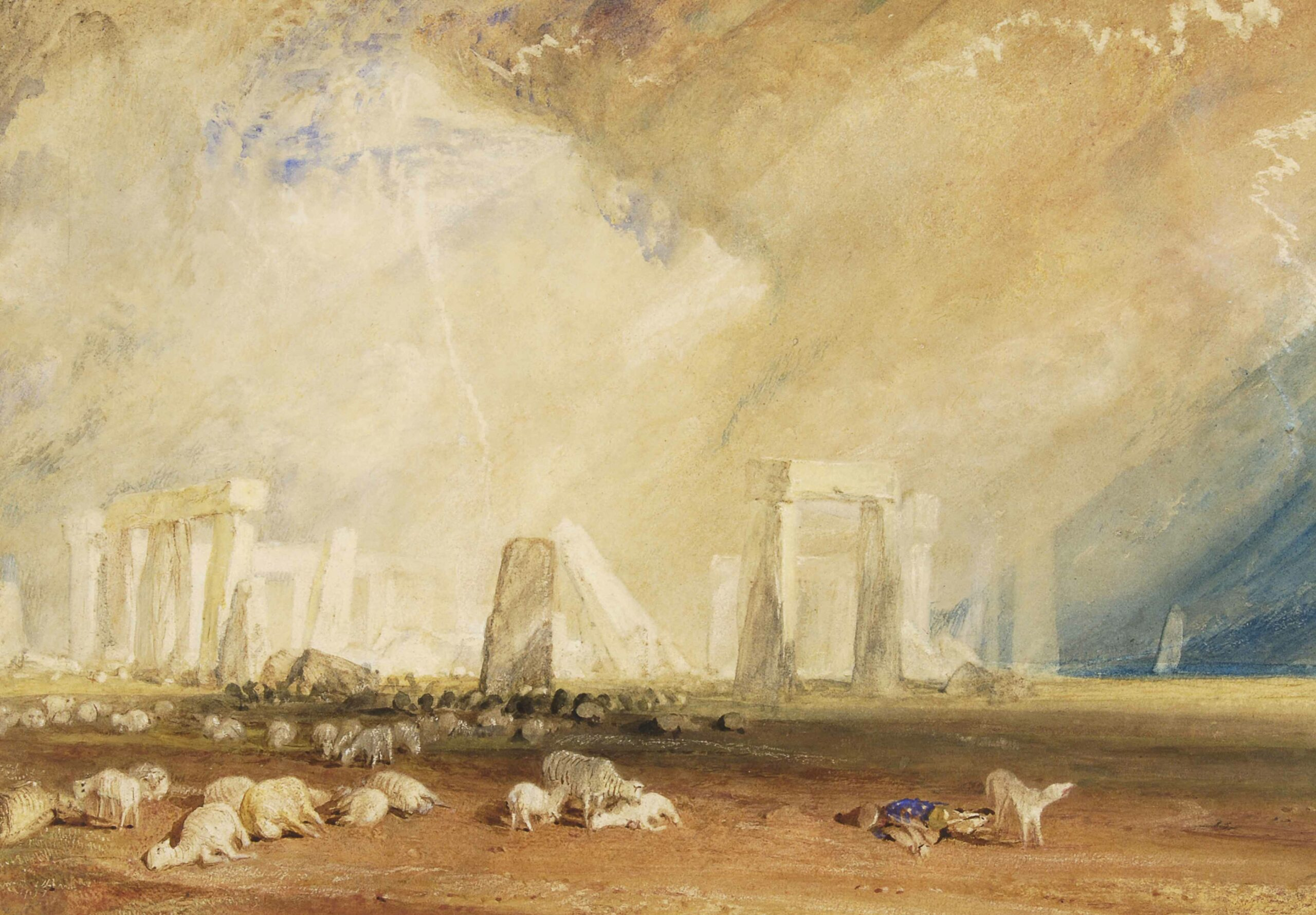
Turner original

He engraved illustrations for Turner's "Picturesque Views on the Southern Coast of England" (with George Cooke), Turner's "England and Wales" and "Rivers of France", Charles Heath's "Picturesque Annual", Robert Jennings's ‘Landscape Annual’, the fine editions of the works of Walter Scott, Thomas Campbell, and Samuel Rogers, the "Keepsake", the "Amulet", the "Literary Souvenir", and many other publications.

On a larger scale he engraved various plates for "The Art Journal" from pictures by Turner, Callcott, Stanfield, Fripp, and others. He also created engravings for the Turner Gallery, including an engraving after Turner's painting Entrance of the Meuse. Wallis's finest productions are the large plates after Turner, "Lake of Nemi" and "Approach to Venice"; a proof of the latter was exhibited at the Royal Academy in 1859, and on its completion he retired from the profession. The remainder of his life was passed at Brighton, where he died on 23 November 1878.

== Family ==
Henry Wallis (1805?–1890), brother of Robert, practised for some years as an engraver of small book-illustrations, but early in life was compelled by attacks of paralysis to seek another occupation. He then turned to picture-dealing, and eventually became the proprietor of the French Gallery in Pall Mall, London, which he conducted successfully until shortly before his death, which occurred on 15 October 1890.

Another brother, William Wallis, born in 1796, is known by a few choice plates executed for Jennings's ‘Landscape Annual,’ Heath's ‘Picturesque Annual,’ the ‘Keepsake,’ etc.
