= Robert Wallace (poet) =

American poet

Robert Arthur Wallace was an American poet. He was born in Springfield, Missouri on January 10, 1932, as the only child of Tincy Stough Wallace and Roy Franklin Wallace. He died April 9, 1999, in Cleveland, Ohio. Wallace was buried at the Lakeview Cemetery there. He served two years in the U.S. Army and was discharged as a private first class.

== Education ==
He graduated Harvard College summa cum laude in 1953 with a bachelor's degree in English. At Harvard he became lifelong friends with fellow student John Updike. He married Emily Mitchell Wallace, a noted William Carlos Williams scholar and also a native of Springfield. Wallace attended St. Catharine's College, Cambridge University on a Fulbright scholarship and Woodrow Wilson Fellowship and received a second B.A. in English there.

== Career ==
Wallace published his first book of poems in 1957, This Various World and Other Poems, in Volume IV of Scribner's Poets of Today series. He began teaching at Bryn Mawr College before he moved to Sweet Briar College (where he met another lifelong friend, artist Lauren Oliver) and then Vassar College. Wallace married his second wife Jan while at Vassar.

He settled his teaching at Western Reserve University (later Case Western Reserve University) in 1965. A second book of poetry, Views from a Ferris Wheel, in 1965, followed by Ungainly Things in 1968. Wallace married Sharon Lillevig in the late 1970s. He published Swimmer in the Rain in 1979, Girlfriends and Wives in 1984 and The Common Summer: New and Collected Poems in 1989. In 1982, Wallace published Writing Poems, a poetry writing text still in use more than thirty years later. He married Christine Seidler Wallace 1982, with whom he stayed until his death in 1999.

Art, nature, and human relationships are frequent themes of Wallace's poetry.

== Bits Press ==
Wallace began Bits Press in 1974. Bits began as a letterpress publishing company dedicated to short poems (12 lines or less), issuing a series of chapbooks entitled bits that were distributed free to a writers, collectors, and others. Bits branched out to publish short fiction in a series entitled pieces. Bits also published chapbooks of works written by individual authors, including Mary Oliver, Updike, Bruce Bennett, Peter Klappert, Peter Meinke and X. J. Kennedy. Bits also published small edition, specially bound volumes for sale to collectors, including The Complete Poetical Works of T. E. Hulme, and Emersonianism by John Updike.

Eventually, Wallace turned Bits Press into an ambitious attempt to widen the market for poetry to the general reader through light verse and funny poems, establishing the series Light Year in 1984. The project was a limited success, but the project was ultimately abandoned in 1989, after Sometime the Cow Kick Your Head. Wallace continued to support similar efforts by Light Quarterly, among others.
