= Robert M. Wallace (philosopher) =

American philosopher

- Born: Robert Marston Wallace; 1947 (age 78–79)

Academic background
- Education: Cornell University (PhD)
- Thesis: Autonomy and the agent's final end: Hegel's reformulation of Kant's argument for the rationality of morality (1994)
- Doctoral advisor: Allen W. Wood
- Other advisors: Terence Irwin, Richard W. Miller, Norman Kretzmann

Academic work
- Era: Contemporary philosophy
- Region: Western philosophy
- School or tradition: German idealism
- Website: https://robertmwallace.blogspot.com/

Robert Marston Wallace (born 1947) is a philosopher.

== Life and works ==
Wallace received a B.A. (first class) in Politics, Philosophy, and Economics from Oxford University in 1968, where he studied at Balliol College and worked with Martin Hollis, Alan Montefiore, Steven Lukes, and briefly, Arthur Prior. He taught for several years at Goddard College in Plainfield, Vermont, then spent a year in the Philosophy doctoral program at Yale University, working with Karsten Harries, Frederick Oscanyan, and Rulon Wells, earning an M.A. in 1973. In 1994, he earned his PhD from Cornell University, with a dissertation on F. H. Bradley and Hegel, entitled Autonomy and the Agent’s Final End: Hegel’s Reformulation of Kant’s Argument for the Rationality of Morality in philosophy.

In the meantime, Wallace translated Hans Blumenberg's The Legitimacy of the Modern Age into English. With the help of Tom McCarthy, it was eventually published by MIT Press. He went on to translate and write on Blumenberg's Work on Myth and The Genesis of the Copernican World, as well as other German philosophical works, including Hans-Georg Gadamer’s Plato’s Dialectical Ethics.

His 2005 book, Hegel's Philosophy of Reality, Freedom, and God was reviewed by Jane Dryden, Jean-Marie Lardic, Robert R. Williams, Peter Steinberger, and Richard Crouter. The interpretation of Hegel presented by Wallace in this book has sparked an intriguing debate between him and Robert R. Williams.

== Selected publications ==
=== Monographs ===
- Hegel's Philosophy of Reality, Freedom, and God. 2005. doi:10.1017/CBO9781139173384. ISBN 978-0-521-84484-0.
- Philosophical Mysticism in Plato, Hegel, and the Present. Bloomsbury. 26 December 2019. ISBN 978-1-350-08287-8.

=== Translations ===
- Blumenberg, Hans (1983). The Legitimacy of the Modern Age. Translated by Wallace, Robert M. MIT Press. ISBN 978-0-262-52105-5.

=== Articles ===
- "Mutual Recognition and Ethics: A Hegelian Reformulation of the Kantian Argument for the Rationality of Morality". American Philosophical Quarterly. 32 (3): 263–270. 1995. ISSN 0003-0481. JSTOR 20009827.
