= 2026 in Romanian kickboxing =

Information
- First date: March 27, 2026

The 2026 season is the 24th season of competitive kickboxing in Romania.

== List of events ==
#	Event Title	Date	Arena	Location
1	Gladius World Series 5	March 7, 2026	Aarhus Firma Sport	Aarhus, Denmark
2	EFC 2	March 27, 2026	Constanța Arena	Constanța, Romania
3	K-1 World MAX 2026 in Bucharest	April 3, 2026	Sala Polivalentă	Bucharest, Romania
4	Colosseum Tournament 49	May 15, 2026	Olimpia Arena	Ploiești, Romania
5	Glorious Fight Championship 1	May 22, 2026	Mandachi Hotel	Suceava, Romania
6	DFS 31	June 19, 2026	Târgu Jiu Arena	Târgu Jiu, Romania
7	Dynasty Kombat: Supreme Battle	June 21, 2026	Apollo Center	Bucharest, Romania
8	Colosseum Tournament 50: Romania vs. Africa	June 26, 2026	Suceava Fortress	Suceava, Romania
9	EFC 3	July 3, 2026	Piațeta Cazino	Mamaia, Constanța, Romania
10	Nicola Fighting Show 5	September 18, 2026	Craiova Arena	Craiova, Romania
11	Spartan Fight Arena II	September 26, 2026	Târgu Mureș Arena	Târgu Mureș, Romania
12	EFC 4	October 2, 2026	Danubius Arena	Tulcea, Romania
13	Gladius World Series 6	October 3, 2026	Aarhus Firma Sport	Aarhus, Denmark
14	Grand Tournament 8	October 3, 2026	Satu Mare Arena	Satu Mare, Romania
15	K-1 World GP -90kg Preliminary in Iași	October 9, 2026	Iași Arena	Iași, Romania
16	Road to DFS 9	October 16, 2026	Târgoviște Arena	Târgoviște, Romania
17	Blood Fight League VIII	October 24, 2026	TBA	Timișoara, Romania
18	Colosseum Tournament 51	October 28, 2026	Sala Polivalentă	Bucharest, Romania
19	Colosseum Tournament 52	December 10, 2026	Olimpia Arena	Ploiești, Romania
20	DFS 33	December 11, 2026	TeraPlast Arena	Bistrița, Romania

== GWS 5 ==
GWS 5
- Promotion: Gladius World Series
- Date: March 7, 2026
- Venue: Aarhus Firma Sport
- City: Aarhus, Denmark

GWS 5: The Battle Continues was a kickboxing event produced by the Gladius World Series that took place on March 7, 2026, at the Aarhus Firma Sport in Aarhus, Denmark.

=== Results ===
Main card
Weight class				Method	Round	Time	Notes
Lightweight	(Romania) Marian Lăpușneanu	def.	(Denmark) Jesper Ibabao Poulsen	Decision (unanimous)	3	3:00
Super Welterweight	(Denmark) Kenneth Prein Larsen	def.	(Denmark) Magnus Drachmann	TKO (retirement)	2	0:22
Super Featherweight	(Afghanistan) Emran Hutak	def.	(Italy) Alessandro Mellone	Decision (majority)	3	3:00
Heavyweight	(Romania) Anatoli Ciumac	def.	(Moldova) Sorin Chiriac	Decision (unanimous)	3	3:00
Light Welterweight	(Sweden) Hubert Majewski	vs.	(Norway) Anders Kalbakk Bøhler	Draw	3	3:00
Super Middleweight	(Kurdistan Region) Dilshad Kalan	def.	(Denmark) Ebrima Hydera Marenah	Decision (split)	3	3:00
Light Welterweight	(Palestine) Majd Atallah	def.	(Brazil) Matthias Usuwiel	TKO (referee stoppage)	1	1:34
Super Featherweight	(Denmark) Malek Zein	def.	(Romania) Darius Simon	Decision (unanimous)	3	3:00
Women's Flyweight	(Denmark) Carina Dalhoff Mathiesen	def.	(Denmark) Lea Pedersen	TKO (doctor stoppage)	3	1:48
Lightweight	(Romania) Robert Moldoveanu	def.	(Turkey) Ömer Kavakli	Decision (unanimous)	3	3:00
Lightweight	(Denmark) Frederik Fenger	def.	(Romania) Mario Terci	Decision (unanimous)	3	3:00

== EFC 2 ==
EFC 2
- Promotion: Elite Fighting Championship; Fight Clubbing
- Date: March 27, 2026
- Venue: Constanța Arena
- City: Constanța, Romania
- Attendance: 2,500

EFC 2 or Fight Clubbing 41 was a kickboxing event produced by the Elite Fighting Championship and Fight Clubbing that took place on March 27, 2026, at the Constanța Arena in Constanța, Romania.

=== Results ===
Main card (Digi Sport)
Weight class				Method	Round	Time	Notes
Junior Bantamweight	(Romania) Cosmin Brumă (c)	def.	(Italy) Gilberto Valentino	TKO (towel thrown)	3	1:57	(Note: For the Fight Clubbing World Featherweight Championship.)
Super Lightweight	(Italy) Angelo Volpe (c)	def.	(Romania) Marian Lăpușneanu	Decision (unanimous)	3	3:00	(Note: Super Fight.)
Featherweight	(Romania) Bogdan Floriștean	def.	(Spain) Javier Gálvez	Decision (unanimous)	5	3:00	(Note: For the Fight Clubbing Interim World Light Welterweight Championship.)
Super Featherweight	(Germany) Chris Wunn	def.	(Romania) Vlad Trif	Decision (split)	3	3:00
Super Lightweight	(Albania) Juri Sinaj	def.	(Romania) Mădălin Crăciunică	Decision (split)	3	3:00
Super Flyweight	(Romania) Robert Hu Hua Long	def.	(Romania) Eduardo Maradin	Decision (split)	3	3:00
Featherweight	(Romania) David Iordache	def.	(Italy) Alex Biasetto	Decision (unanimous)	3	3:00
Super Lightweight	(Romania) Florin Mardiaș	def.	(Switzerland) Philipp Stöckli	Decision (unanimous)	3	3:00

== Dynamite Fighting Show 30 ==
Dynamite Fighting Show 30
- Promotion: Dynamite Fighting Show; K-1; ISKA
- Date: April 3, 2026
- Venue: Sala Polivalentă
- City: Bucharest, Romania
- Attendance: 4,500

Dynamite Fighting Show 30 or K-1 World MAX 2026 in Bucharest was a kickboxing event produced by the Dynamite Fighting Show, K-1 and ISKA that took place on April 3, 2026, at the Sala Polivalentă in Bucharest, Romania.

=== K-1 MAX Bucharest Tournament bracket ===
Quarter-finals
(Romania) Călin Petrișor	3
(Moldova) Vitalie Matei	UD
(Latvia) Mareks Pelcis	SD
(Romania) Ștefan Vrânceanu	3
(Romania) Andrei Varga	1
(Ukraine) Serhii Adamchuk	TKO
(Romania) Albert Enache	KO
(Turkey) Yıldırım Oğuz	2

Semi-finals
(Moldova) Vitalie Matei	TKO
(Latvia) Mareks Pelcis	2
(Ukraine) Serhii Adamchuk	KO
(Romania) Albert Enache	2

Final
(Moldova) Vitalie Matei	3
(Ukraine) Serhii Adamchuk	UD

=== Results ===
Main card (Pro Arena)
Weight class				Method	Round	Time	Notes
Light Heavyweight	(Romania) Bogdan Stoica	def.	(Togo) Gerardo Atti	Decision (unanimous)	3	3:00
Lightweight	(Ukraine) Serhii Adamchuk	def.	(Moldova) Vitalie Matei	Decision (unanimous)	3	3:00	(Note: K-1 World MAX 2026 Qualifier Tournament, Final.)
Welterweight	(Moldova) Constantin Rusu	def.	(Romania) Florin Lambagiu (c)	Decision (unanimous)	3	3:00	(Note: Super Fight)
Heavyweight	(Romania) Anatoli Ciumac	def.	(Romania) Ion Grigore	Decision (unanimous)	3	3:00
Openweight	(Romania) Mihai Zmărăndescu	def.	(Romania) Adrian Lupșe	Decision (unanimous)	3	3:00
Lightweight	(Ukraine) Serhii Adamchuk	def.	(Romania) Albert Enache	KO (low kick)	2	2:18	(Note: K-1 World MAX 2026 Qualifier Tournament, Semifinals.)
Lightweight	(Moldova) Vitalie Matei	def.	(Latvia) Mareks Pelcis	TKO (2 knockdowns)	1	1:53	(Note: K-1 World MAX 2026 Qualifier Tournament, Semifinals.)
Super Middleweight	(Romania) Mirel Iacob	def.	(Romania) Costin Dinu	KO (low kick)	2	0:30
Middleweight	(Romania) Aaron Măcăilă	def.	(Ukraine) Yurii Krehul	TKO (3 knockdowns)	2	1:06
Lightweight	(Romania) Albert Enache	def.	(Turkey) Yıldırım Oğuz	KO (low kicks)	2	1:03	(Note: K-1 World MAX 2026 Qualifier Tournament, Quarterfinals.)
Lightweight	(Ukraine) Serhii Adamchuk	def.	(Romania) Andrei Varga	TKO (2 knockdowns)	1	2:34	(Note: K-1 World MAX 2026 Qualifier Tournament, Quarterfinals.)
Lightweight	(Latvia) Mareks Pelcis	def.	(Romania) Ștefan Vrânceanu	Decision (split)	3	3:00	(Note: K-1 World MAX 2026 Qualifier Tournament, Quarterfinals.)
Lightweight	(Moldova) Vitalie Matei	def.	(Romania) Călin Petrișor	Decision (unanimous)	3	3:00	(Note: K-1 World MAX 2026 Qualifier Tournament, Quarterfinals.)

== Colosseum Tournament 49 ==
Colosseum Tournament 49
- Promotion: Colosseum Tournament
- Date: May 15, 2026
- Venue: Olimpia Arena
- City: Ploiești, Romania
- Attendance: 3,600

Colosseum Tournament 49 was a kickboxing event produced by the Colosseum Tournament that took place on May 15, 2026, at the Olimpia Arena in Ploiești, Romania.

=== Results ===
Main card (Digi Sport)
Weight class				Method	Round	Time	Notes
Bantamweight	(Romania) Daniel Dragomir (c)	def.	(Romania) Iulian Marinescu	TKO (referee stoppage)	5	2:36	(Note: For the Colosseum Tournament World Bantamweight Championship.)
Super Welterweight	(Netherlands) Shefit Qose	def.	(Romania) Alex Panțîru (c)	TKO (foot injury)	1	2:25	(Note: Super Fight.)

== Glorious FC 1 ==
Glorious FC 1
- Promotion: Glorious Fight Championship
- Date: May 22, 2026
- Venue: Mandachi Hotel
- City: Suceava, Romania

Glorious FC 1 was a kickboxing event produced by the Glorious Fight Championship that took place on May 22, 2026, at the Mandachi Hotel in Suceava, Romania.

=== Results ===
Main card (Sport Extra)
Weight class				Method	Round	Time	Notes
Super Featherweight	(Romania) Bogdan Floriștean	def.	(Germany) Murat İnan	KO (body punch)	2	2:39	(Note: For the WKN European Welterweight Championship.)

== Dynamite Fighting Show 31 ==
Dynamite Fighting Show 31
- Promotion: Dynamite Fighting Show
- Date: June 19, 2026
- Venue: Târgu Jiu Arena
- City: Târgu Jiu, Romania

Dynamite Fighting Show 31 was a kickboxing and boxing event produced by the Dynamite Fighting Show that is scheduled to take place on June 19, 2026, at the Târgu Jiu Arena in Târgu Jiu, Romania.

Remy Bonjasky made special guest appearance at the event.

=== Background ===
A one night, eight-man middleweight tournament took place at the event. The winner was awarded the DFS Championship.

=== Results ===
Main card (Pro Arena)
Weight class				Method	Round	Time	Notes
Light Heavyweight	(Romania) Andrei Stoica	vs.	(France) Zinedine Hameur-Lain	No contest (accidental illegal kick)	1	2:32
Lightweight	(Romania) Albert Enache	def.	(Romania) Ștefan Vrânceanu	Decision (split)	3	3:00	(Note: Final. For the vacant DFS Middleweight Championship.)
Heavyweight	(Romania) Vasile Corcodel	def.	(Hungary) Tibor Varga	TKO (towel thrown/left hook)	1	0:40
Lightweight	(Romania) Albert Enache	def.	(Romania) Cristian Neacșu	Decision (split)	3	3:00	(Note: Semifinals.)
Lightweight	(Romania) Ștefan Vrânceanu	def.	(Romania) Edmond Mustafa	TKO (corner stoppage)	1	1:05	(Note: Semifinals.)
Middleweight	(Romania) Aaron Măcăilă	def.	(Romania) Elis Peterneamț	TKO (three knockdowns)	1	1:15
Lightweight	(Romania) Albert Enache	def.	(Romania) Laurențiu Fatiol	TKO (punches)	1	2:15	(Note: Quarterfinals.)
Lightweight	(Romania) Cristian Neacșu	vs.	(Romania) Andrei Varga				(Note: Quarterfinals. Neacșu advanced to the semifinals after Varga missed weight.)
Lightweight	(Romania) Ștefan Vrânceanu	def.	(Romania) Cezar Buzdugan	TKO (retirement)	2	1:25	(Note: Quarterfinals.)
Lightweight	(Romania) Edmond Mustafa	def.	(Romania) Darius Oltean	Decision (unanimous)	3	3:00	(Note: Quarterfinals.)
Preliminary Card
Heavyweight	(Romania) Narcis Bădoi	def.	(Romania) Ștefan Băloi	TKO (referee stoppage)	1	0:45
Super Featherweight	(Netherlands) Lowie Philippona	def.	(Romania) Irinel Constantin	Decision (unanimous)	3	3:00

== Colosseum Tournament 50 ==
Colosseum Tournament 50
- Promotion: Colosseum Tournament
- Date: June 26, 2026
- Venue: Suceava Fortress
- City: Suceava, Romania

Colosseum Tournament 50: Romania vs Africa was an outdoor kickboxing and boxing event produced by the Colosseum Tournament that took place on June 26, 2026, at the Suceava Fortress in Suceava, Romania.

Semmy Schilt, Ciprian Sora, Ionuț Atodiresei and Ionuț Iftimoaie made special guest appearances at the event.

=== Background ===
A heavyweight non-title fight between current Colosseum Tournament World Heavyweight Champion Alin Nechita and consecutive WAKO world championship gold medalist 'Surat Garayev' headlined the event.

=== Results ===
Main card (Sporteo.tv, Triller TV)
Weight class				Method	Round	Time	Notes
Heavyweight	(Romania) Alin Nechita (c)	def.	(Azerbaijan) Surat Garayev	Decision (unanimous)	3	3:00	(Note: Super Fight.)
Featherweight	(Romania) Adrian Maxim	def.	(Romania) Andrei Sîrghi	Decision (unanimous)	5	3:00	(Note: For the vacant Colosseum Tournament World Featherweight Championship.)
Light Heavyweight	(Morocco) Karim Lahboub	def.	(Romania) Ștefan Veber	Decision (unanimous)	3	3:00	(Note: Romania vs Africa.)
Middleweight	(Romania) Sorin Mihalescul	def.	(Algeria) Fahim Malikzada	Decision (unanimous)	3	3:00	(Note: Entertainment Fight. Romania vs Africa.)
Super Welterweight	(Romania) Artiom Livădari	def.	(Netherlands) Nouri de Jager	Decision (unanimous)	3	3:00	(Note: Romania vs Africa.)
Heavyweight	(Curaçao) Jeremy Mercera	def.	(Romania) Cosmin Bucoveanu	TKO (corner stoppage)	1	2:36	(Note: Romania vs Africa.)
Lightweight	(Romania) Adrian Baciu	def.	(Romania) Constantin Holdur	Ext. R Decision (split)	4	3:00
Lightweight	(Romania) Vlad Ghenghea	def.	(Romania) Alex Paraschivu	Decision (unanimous)	3	3:00
Heavyweight	(Romania) Daniel Alexandru	def.	(Romania) Daniel Vasilachi	Decision (unanimous)	3	3:00
Light Heavyweight	(Romania) Andrei Șerban	def.	(Romania) Roberto Troancă	KO (punches)	2	1:17

== EFC 3 ==
EFC 3
- Promotion: Elite Fighting Championship
- Date: July 3, 2026
- Venue: Piațeta Cazino
- City: Mamaia, Constanța, Romania

EFC 3 was an outdoor kickboxing event produced by the Elite Fighting Championship that took place on July 3, 2026, at the Piațeta Cazino in Mamaia, Constanța, Romania.

=== Results ===
Main card (Sporteo.tv)
Weight class				Method	Round	Time	Notes
Bantamweight	(Romania) Cosmin Brumă	def.	(Algeria) Islam El Krarraz Mokhtar	KO (liver punch)	2	2:45	(Note: For the WKN European Super Bantamweight Championship.)
Super Featherweight	(Romania) Bogdan Floriștean	def.	(Italy) Danilo Barletta	Decision (unanimous)	3	3:00
Featherweight	(Romania) Daniel Dragomir	def.	(Spain) Achraf Mihit	Decision (split)	3	3:00
Welterweight	(Romania) Anghel Cardoș	def.	(Romania) Mădălin Crăciunică	TKO (doctor stoppage)	2	0:56
Super Featherweight	(Romania) Vlad Trif	def.	(Morocco) Badr Ghazi	KO (low kick)	2	1:24
Middleweight	(Romania) Mădălin Mogoş	def.	(Romania) Mario Bogdan	TKO (low kick)	2	2:58
Lightweight	(Romania) Teodor Șerban	def.	(Romania) Florin Mardiaș	Decision (unanimous)	3	3:00
Heavyweight	(Romania) Daniel Morar	def.	(Romania) Valentin Bordianu	TKO (referee stoppage)	1	2:45
Light Welterweight	(Romania) Fabian Popa	def.	(Romania) David Pătru	KO (high kick)	2	2:41

== EFC 4 ==
EFC 4
- Promotion: Elite Fighting Championship
- Date: October 2, 2026
- Venue: Danubius Arena
- City: Tulcea, Romania

EFC 3 was a kickboxing and kyokushin event produced by the Elite Fighting Championship that took place on October 2, 2026, at the Danubius Arena in Tulcea, Romania.

=== Results ===
Main card (Sporteo.tv)
Weight class				Method	Round	Time	Notes
Bantamweight	(Romania) Cosmin Brumă	def.	(Spain) Ismael El Brigui	TKO (three knockdowns/punches)	1	2:45
Super Featherweight	(Romania) Ștefan Vrânceanu	def.	(Romania) Cezar Mihălcuț	TKO (corner stoppage/calf kicks)	1	3:00	(Note: Tournament Final to determine the inaugural EFC Super Featherweight Champion.)
Lightweight	(Spain) David Boroș	def.	(Romania) Marian Lăpușneanu	Decision (split)	3	3:00
Middleweight	(Morocco) Mohammed Benabbes	def.	(Romania) Radu Medeleanu	Decision (split)	3	3:00
Heavyweight	(Romania) Daniel Morar	def.	(Romania) Marius Comănescu	KO (punches)	2	2:41
Lightweight	(Romania) Cătălin Makove	def.	(Romania) Teodor Șerban	Decision (split)	3	3:00
Super Featherweight	(Romania) Vlad Trif	def.	(Romania) Cezar Mihălcuț	Decision (unanimous)	3	3:00	(Note: EFC Super Featherweight Championship Tournament Semifinal.)
Super Featherweight	(Romania) Ștefan Vrânceanu	def.	(Romania) David Iordache	TKO (three knockdowns)	2	0:55	(Note: EFC Super Featherweight Championship Tournament Semifinal.)
Welterweight	(Romania) Paul Danci	def.	(Romania) Daniel Micu	TKO (doctor stoppage)	1	1:20

== Dynamite Fighting Show 32 ==
Dynamite Fighting Show 32
- Promotion: Dynamite Fighting Show; K-1
- Date: October 9, 2026
- Venue: Iași Arena
- City: Iași, Romania

Dynamite Fighting Show 32 or K-1 World GP -90kg Preliminary in Iași was a kickboxing event produced by the Dynamite Fighting Show and K-1 that took place on October 9, 2026, at the Iași Arena in Iași, Romania.

Remy Bonjasky, Benjamin Adegbuyi, Ștefan Lătescu and Andrei Stoica made special guest appearances at the event.

=== Results ===
Main card (Pro Arena)
Weight class				Method	Round	Time	Notes
Openweight	(Romania) Florin Lambagiu	def.	(Romania) Cristian Ristea	Decision (unanimous)	3	3:00
Lightweight	(Romania) Albert Enache	def.	(France) Hugo Villeneuve	KO (head knee)	1	0:45	(Note: For ISKA European Championship.)
Cruiserweight	(Romania) Vasile Corcodel	def.	(Romania) Gabriel Bodescu	Decision (unanimous)	3	3:00	(Note: K-1 World GP -90kg Preliminary in Romania, Final.)
Welterweight	(Romania) Tudor Potoroacă	def.	(Italy) Francesco Carbotti	TKO (three knockdowns)	1	2:51
Welterweight	(Romania) Andrei Leuștean	def.	(Spain) Jaiteh Ndow Bubu	TKO (three knockdowns)	2	2:14
Super Featherweight	(Romania) Emi Lupaşcu	def.	(Moldova) Damir Popovici	Decision (majority)	3	3:00
Women's Bantamweight	(Romania) Denisa Vulpe	def.	(Moldova) Maria Chișca	TKO (punches)	3	1:02
Cruiserweight	(Romania) Marius Rotaru	def.	(Romania) Mădălin Mogoş	TKO (referee stoppage)	1	2:59	(Note: K-1 World GP -90kg Preliminary in Romania, Reserve Fight.)
Cruiserweight	(Romania) Gabriel Bodescu	def.	(Romania) Aaron Măcăilă	Decision (unanimous)	3	3:00	(Note: K-1 World GP -90kg Preliminary in Romania, Semifinals.)
Cruiserweight	(Romania) Vasile Corcodel	def.	(Romania) Sebastian Lutaniuc	Decision (unanimous)	3	3:00	(Note: K-1 World GP -90kg Preliminary in Romania, Semifinals.)

== Road to DFS 9 ==
Road to DFS 9
- Promotion: Dynamite Fighting Show; Clash of the Titans
- Date: October 16, 2026
- Venue: Târgoviște Arena
- City: Târgoviște, Romania

Road to DFS 9 is a kickboxing and boxing event produced by the Dynamite Fighting Show that is scheduled to take place on October 16, 2026 at the Târgoviște Arena in Târgoviște, Romania.

=== Results ===
Main card (Pro Arena)
Weight class				Method	Round	Time	Notes
Lightweight	(Romania) Călin Petrișor	def.	(Hungary) Mátyás Borsodi	Decision (unanimous)	3	3:00
Heavyweight	(Romania) David Covaci	def.	(Romania) Adrian Niculae	KO (punches)	1	2:53
Super Welterweight	(Romania) David Staicu	def.	(Romania) Neculai Bosnea	KO (knee to the head)	1	1:49
Welterweight	(Romania) Denis Ceaușu	def.	(Romania) Laurențiu Crăciun	Decision (split)	3	3:00
Heavyweight	(Romania) Jane Ungureanu	def.	(Romania) Vali Chirea	Decision (unanimous)	3	3:00
Welterweight	(Romania) Eduard David	def.	(Romania) Răzvan Duță	Decision (unanimous)	3	3:00
Welterweight	(Romania) Alexandru Andreescu	def.	(Romania) George Curteanu	Decision (split)	3	3:00

== Colosseum Tournament 51 ==
Colosseum Tournament 51
- Promotion: Colosseum Tournament
- Date: October 28, 2026
- Venue: Sala Polivalentă
- City: Bucharest, Romania

Colosseum Tournament 51 is a kickboxing event produced by the Colosseum Tournament that is scheduled to take place on October 28, 2026, at the Sala Polivalentă in Bucharest, Romania.

=== Results ===
Main card (Sporteo.tv)
Weight class				Method	Round	Time	Notes
Heavyweight	(Romania) Cristian Ristea	def.	(Turkey) Serdar Eroğlu	Decision	3	3:00	(Note: Colosseum Tournament World Heavyweight Title Eliminator.)
Bantamweight	(Romania) Daniel Dragomir (c)	def.	(Iran) Amin Ghorbani	TKO (punch)	1	1:30	(Note: Super Fight.)
Heavyweight	(Romania) Robert Damian	def.	(Netherlands) Jordy Visser	Decision (unanimous)	3	3:00
Featherweight	(Romania) Adrian Maxim	def.	(Italy) Eugenio Paladiev	TKO (doctor stoppage)	1	3:00
Heavyweight	(Romania) Daniel Alexandru	def.	(Romania) Valentin Bordianu	Decision (split)	3	3:00
Openweight	(Romania) Marian Matei	def.	(Romania) Andrei Șerban	Decision (unanimous)	3	3:00
Lightweight	(Romania) Vlad Ghenghea	def.	(Romania) Laurențiu Crăciun	TKO (doctor stoppage)	1	2:05
Heavyweight	(Romania) Marian Dunca	def.	(Morocco) Tarik Cherkaoui	TKO (punches)	1	0:43
Lightweight	(Romania) Alexandru Paraschivu	def.	(Romania) Valentin Nică	Decision (unanimous)	3	3:00
Light Heavyweight	(Romania) Robert Vitejeanu	def.	(Romania) Emanuel Tufan	Decision (unanimous)	3	3:00
Middleweight	(Iran) Ehsan Vafaei	def.	(Romania) Răzvan Popa	TKO (low kick)	1	0:42
Welterweight	(Romania) Cătălin Ganuci	def.	(Egypt) Dawoud Ganyar	TKO (referee stoppage)	3	1:05

== See also ==
- SUPERKOMBAT
- 2026 in Glory
- 2026 in K-1
