= Sala Polivalentă =

Sala Polivalentă may refer to:

- Arena Polivalentă, a 20,000-seat multi-purpose arena in Bucharest, Romania
- Sala Polivalentă (Timișoara), a 16,000-seat multi-purpose arena in Timișoara, Romania
- Sala Polivalentă Regina Maria, a 10,212-seat multi-purpose arena in Iași, Romania
- Sala Polivalentă (Brașov), a 10,059-seat multi-purpose arena in Brașov, Romania
- Sala Polivalentă (Cluj-Napoca), a 10,000-seat multi-purpose arena in Cluj-Napoca, Romania
- Sala Polivalentă (Bucharest), a 5,300-seat multi-purpose arena in Bucharest, Romania
- Sala Polivalentă (Oradea), a 5,265-seat multi-purpose arena in Oradea, Romania
- Sala Polivalentă (Constanța), a 5,000-seat multi-purpose arena in Constanța, Romania
- Sala Polivalentă (Pitești), a 4,900-seat multi-purpose arena in Pitești, Romania
- Sala Polivalentă (Tulcea), a 4,438-seat multi-purpose arena in Tulcea, Romania
- Sala Sporturilor (Craiova), a 4,215-seat multi-purpose arena in Craiova, Romania
- Sala Polivalentă (Piatra Neamţ), a 4,000-seat multi-purpose arena in Piatra Neamț, Romania
- Sala Polivalentă (Turda), a 3,320-seat multi-purpose arena in Turda, Romania
- Sala Polivalentă (Bistrița), a 3,007-seat multi-purpose arena in Bistrița, Romania
- Sala Polivalentă (Sfântu Gheorghe), a 3,000-seat multi-purpose arena in Sfântu Gheorghe, Romania
- Sala Polivalentă (Slatina), a 3,000-seat multi-purpose arena in Slatina, Romania
- Sala Polivalentă Dinamo, a 2,538-seat multi-purpose arena in Bucharest, Romania
- Sala Polivalentă (Blaj), a 2,000-seat multi-purpose arena in Blaj, Romania
