= Polyvalence =

Polyvalence or polyvalent may refer to:

- Polyvalency (chemistry), chemical species, generally atoms or molecules, which exhibit more than one chemical valence
- Polyvalence (music), the musical use of more than one harmonic function of a tonality simultaneously
- Polyvalent antibody, a group of antibodies that have affinity for various antigens
- Polyvalent logic, a form of many-valued logic or probabilistic logic
- Polyvalent vaccine, a vaccine that can vaccinate a person against more than one strain of a disease
- Sala Polivalentă (disambiguation), various stadiums in Romania commonly translated as Polyvalent Hall
- Snake antivenom that contains neutralizing antibodies against two or more species of snakes

== See also ==
- Bivalence, principle in logic that every declaration is either true or false
- Monovalence (disambiguation)
- Valence (disambiguation)
