= Valence =

Valence or valency may refer to:

== Science ==
- Valence (chemistry), a measure of an element's combining power with other atoms
- Valence electron, electrons in the outer shell of an atom's energy levels
- Valence quarks, those quarks within a hadron that determine the hadron's quantum numbers
- Degree (graph theory), also called the valency of a vertex in graph theory
- Valency (linguistics), aspect of verbs relative to other parts of speech
- Valence (psychology) or hedonic tone, the (emotional) value associated with an event, object or situation

== Places ==
=== France ===
- Valence, Charente, a commune in the Charente department
- Valence, Drôme, Drôme, a commune and prefecture of the Drôme department
  - University of Valence, a medieval university
- Valence, Tarn-et-Garonne, a commune in the Tarn-et-Garonne department
- Canton of Valence, Tarn-et-Garonne department
- Arrondissement of Valence, Drôme department
- Roman Catholic Diocese of Valence
- Valence-d'Albigeois, in the Tarn department
- Valence-en-Brie, in the Seine-et-Marne department
- Valence-en-Poitou, in the Vienne department
- Valence-sur-Baïse, in the Gers department
- Bourg-lès-Valence, in the Drôme department

=== England ===
- River Valency, Cornwall
- Valence House, London

=== Spain ===
- The French-language name for the city of Valencia, Spain

== People ==
- Amasio Valence (born 1979), Fijian rugby union player
- David Valence (born 1981), French politician
- Maurice Valency (1903–1996), American playwright, author, critic and professor
- Aymer de Valence (bishop) (c. 1220–1260), bishop of Winchester
- William de Valence, 1st Earl of Pembroke (1225–1296), French nobleman who played an important role in English politics
- Valence Mendis (born 1958), fourth bishop of Chilaw

== Other uses ==
- Valence Technology, an American battery manufacturer

== See also ==
- Valance (disambiguation)
- Valencia (disambiguation)
- Valença (disambiguation)
- Valentia (disambiguation)
- Valenza (disambiguation)
- Polyvalence (disambiguation)
