= Valença =

Valença may refer to:

== People ==
- Valensi (surname), alternative spelling
- Marquis of Valença, a Portuguese title of nobility
- Count of Valença, a Portuguese title of nobility
- Alceu Valença (born 1946), a Brazilian composer
- Valença (footballer) (born 1982), full name Manoel Cordeiro Valença Neto, Brazilian footballer
- Rosinha de Valença (1941–2004), a Brazilian composer and musician

== Places ==
- Valença, Portugal
- Valença, Bahia, Brazil
  - Valença Airport
- Valença, Rio de Janeiro, Brazil
- Valença do Piauí, Brazil

== See also ==
- Valence (disambiguation)
- Valencia (disambiguation)
- Valentia (disambiguation)
- Valensia (Aldous Byron Valensia Clarkson, born 1971), a Dutch composer and musician
- Valenza, a place in Italy
