= Valencia (disambiguation) =

Valencia (Valencian: València) is a city in Spain. It may also refer to:

== Places ==
=== Spain ===
- Valencian Community or Autonomous Community of Valencia (a.k.a. Valencian Country), an autonomous community of Spain
  - Valencians, an ethnic group or nationality whose homeland is the Valencian Community
  - Valencian language, the native language of the Valencian Community, also regarded as a linguistic variety of the Catalan language
  - Province of Valencia, a Valencian subnational entity within the Valencian Community
    - Valencia (Congress of Deputies constituency), the parliamentary district covering the province of Valencia
    - Valencia (DO), Denominación de Origen wine-producing region within Valencia province
    - University of Valencia, a Spanish University
    - Roman Catholic Archdiocese of Valencia in Spain, a Catholic ecclesiastical territory located in northeastern Iberia
- Gulf of Valencia
- Taifa of Valencia, an entity that existed during Islamic Spain from c. 1010 to c. 1238
- Kingdom of Valencia, an entity of the Crown of Aragon that existed from 1238 to 1707
- Principality of Valencia, a principality founded by El Cid
- Valencia de Alcántara, a town in Extremadura
- Valencia de Don Juan, a town in Castile and León

=== Philippines ===
- Nueva Valencia, a third income class municipality in the province of Guimaras
- Valencia, Bohol, a fourth income class municipality in the province of Bohol
- Valencia, Bukidnon, a second income class component city in the province of Bukidnon
- Valencia, Cagdianao, a barangay in Cagdianao municipality in the province of Dinagat Islands
- Valencia, Negros Oriental, a first income class municipality in the province of Negros Oriental

=== United States ===
- Valencia, California, an unincorporated community in Los Angeles County
- Valencia, Santa Clarita, California, a neighborhood in Santa Clarita in Los Angeles County
- Valencia West, Arizona, a census-designated place (CDP)
- Valencia, Santa Fe County, New Mexico, a CDP
- Valencia, Valencia County, New Mexico, a CDP
- Valencia, Pennsylvania, a borough
- Valencia (Ridgeway, South Carolina), plantation house listed on the U.S. National Register of Historic Places in Fairfield County, South Carolina

=== Venezuela ===
- Valencia, Venezuela, third largest city in Venezuela
  - Roman Catholic Archdiocese of Valencia in Venezuela, an archdiocese located in the city of Valencia in Venezuela
- Lake Valencia (Venezuela), a lake within Carabobo State and Aragua State, in northern Venezuela

=== Other ===
- Valencia Park, Mbombela, South Africa
- Valencia, Córdoba, Colombia
- Valencia, Ecuador
- Valencia, Trinidad and Tobago
- Valencia, Universidad, Puerto Rico
- Lake Valencia (Peru)

== People ==
- Adolfo Valencia (born 1968), Colombian footballer
- Alejandra Valencia (born 1994), Mexican archer
- Antonio Valencia (born 1985), Ecuadorian footballer
- Angie Sanclemente Valencia (born 1979), Colombian model
- Arleene Correa Valencia, Mexican embroidery, textile artist
- Doctor X (wrestler)' (1968–2011), stage name of Mexican professional wrestler Clemente Valencia
- Danny Valencia (born 1984), American-Israeli major league baseball player
- Eduardo Valencia (born 2000), Venezuelan baseball player
- Enner Valencia (born 1989), Ecuadorian footballer
- Esteban Valencia (born 1972), Chilean footballer
- Eugene A. Valencia Jr. (1921–1972), United States Navy fighter ace in World War II
- Juan José Florián Valencia (born c. 1982), Colombian paracyclist
- Jesse Valencia, American musician, author, and actor
- Larry Valencia (born 1958), American politician
- Robin Valencia, American "canon-girl" stuntwoman

== Sports ==
- Club Valencia (Maldives), a Maldivian football club
- Valencia Basket, a Spanish basketball club
- Valencia CF, a Spanish football club
- Valencia FC (Haiti), a Haitian football club
- Circuit de Valencia, a motor racing circuit in Spain
- Valencia Street Circuit, a motor racing circuit in Spain
- Comunitat Valenciana, Spanish cycling team (2004–2006), formerly Kelme

== Music ==
- Valencia (band), an American alternative rock band
- "Valencia" (song), a 1926 pasodoble by Spanish composer José Padilla
- "O Valencia!", a 2006 song by The Decemberists

== Other uses ==
- Valencian, a member of Pembroke College, Cambridge
- SS Valencia, a ship wrecked in 1906
- Valencia (1926 film), a 1926 American silent romance film
- Valencia (1927 film), a 1927 German silent film
- Valencia (2011 film), a 2011 adaptation of Michelle Tea's novel of the same name
- Valencia, the code name of the American film 10 Cloverfield Lane
- Valencia College, in Florida
- Valencia orange, a variety of the orange fruit
- Valencia Street, in San Francisco
- Valencia (fish), a genus of fish
- Valencia (novel), a novel by Michelle Tea

== See also ==
- Valencia County News-Bulletin, a weekly newspaper in Belen, New Mexico, United States
- Murder of Jesse Valencia (2004)
- Valancia, Pakistan
- Valença (disambiguation)
- Valence (disambiguation)
- Valensi, alternative spelling
- Valensia (born 1971), Dutch composer, producer, and multi-instrumentalist
- Valentia (disambiguation)
- Valenzuela (disambiguation)
