= List of indoor arenas in Romania =

The following is a list of indoor arenas in Romania with a capacity of at least 1,000 spectators, most of the arenas in this list are for multi use proposes and are used for popular sports such as individual sports like karate, judo, boxing as well as team sports like handball, basketball, volleyball. The arenas also serves as a venue for cultural and political events.

== Currently in use ==
Location	Arena	Date built	Capacity
Bucharest	Polyvalent Hall	1974	5,300
Bucharest	Dinamo Polyvalent Hall	2013	2,538
Bucharest	Rapid Polyvalent Hall		1,500
Baia-Mare	Lascăr Pană Sports Hall	1974	2,048
Bistrita	TeraPlast Arena	2022	3,007
Blaj	Polyvalent Hall	2023	2,000
Brașov	Brasov Olympic Ice Rink	2010	2,000
Brașov	Dumitru Popescu Colibași Sports Hall	1975	1,700
Brăila	Danubius Polyvalent Hall		2,200
Buzău	Romeo Iamandi Sports Hall	1982	1,868
Călăraşi	Polyvalent Hall	2011	1,540
Chiajna	Concordia Sports Hall	2006	1,465
Cluj-Napoca	BTarena	2014	10,000
Cluj-Napoca	Horia Demian Sports Hall	1970	2,525
Constanța	Constanța Sports Hall		1,500
Craiova	Polyvalent Hall	2012	4,215
Drobeta-Turnu Severin	Polyvalent Hall		1,800
Focșani	Vrancea Sports Hall	1975	1,400
Galaţi	Galaţi Skating Rink	1970	5,000
Galaţi	Dunărea Sports Hall	1973	1,500
Gheorgheni	Gheorgheni Skating Rink		2,000
Miercurea-Ciuc	Lajos Vakar Ice Hall	1971	4,000
Miercurea-Ciuc	Erőss Zsolt Aréna		1,200
Mioveni	Mioveni Sports Hall	2021	2,500
Oradea	Oradea Arena	2022	5,200
Oradea	Antonio Alexe Arena	1970	2,500
Oradea	Ioan Alexandru Olympic Pool	2007	1,035
Otopeni	Otopeni Olympic Aquatics Centre	2021	2,797
Piatra Neamț	Polyvalent Hall	2011	4,000
Pitești	Pitești Arena	2022	4,900
Pitești	Trivale Sports Hall		2,000
Ploiești	Olimpia Sports Hall	1972	3,500
Râmnicu Vâlcea	Traian Sports Hall	1982	3,126
Sfântu Gheorghe	Sepsi Arena	2017	3,000
Sibiu	Transilvania Sports Hall	1998	1,850
Târgu Jiu	Târgu Jiu Sports Hall	2018	1,223
Târgu Mureş	Târgu Mureş Sports Hall	1978	2,000
Timișoara	Constantin Jude Sports Hall	1968	1,400
Turda	Turda Arena	2023	3,183

== Under construction ==
Arena	Capacity	Opening	Location
Polyvalent Hall	5,000	2024	Constanța
Polyvalent Hall	10,059	2026	Brașov
Polyvalent Hall	4,438	2024	Tulcea
Polyvalent Hall	5,000	2024	Suceava

== See also ==
- List of football stadiums in Romania
- List of indoor arenas by capacity
