= Monovalence =

Monovalence or Monovalent may refer to:

- Monovalent ion, an atom, ion, or chemical group with a valency of one, which thus can form one covalent bond
- Monovalent vaccine, a vaccine directed at only one pathogen
- Monovalent antibody, an antibody with affinity for one epitope, antigen, or strain of microorganism
- Monovalent verb or Intransitive verb, a verb that takes no direct object and has only one argument

== See also ==
- Valence (disambiguation)
- Polyvalence (disambiguation)
