= Valensi =

Valensi, also spelled Valença, Valencia, al-Valensi, Balansi, Valencin, or Valenciano, is a Jewish surname of Sephardic origin. According to Encyclopaedia Judaica, the surname originated in the city of Valencia (Spain) during the Middle Ages. Since the 17th century, the spelling Valença has also been associated with crypto-jews in Pernambuco, a state in northeastern Brazil.

Notable people with the surname include:

- Georges Valensi (1889–1980), French telecommunications engineer
- Lucette Valensi (born 1936), French historian
- Nick Valensi (born 1981), American musician and songwriter

== See also ==
- Valença (disambiguation)
- Valencia (disambiguation)
- Valencia, a place in Spain
