= Jesse Valencia =

American musician, author, and actor (born 1985)

- Born: Jesse Michael-Geronimo Valencia
- Origin: Phoenix, Arizona, US
- Genres: Indie rock, Psychedelic rock, Alternative rock, power pop, folk
- Instruments: Guitar, bass guitar, keyboards, piano, drums, harmonica
- Years active: 2001–present

Jesse Michael-Geronimo Valencia is an American musician, author, actor, and founding member of the band Gorky.

== Early life ==
Valencia's family moved to Show Low, Arizona when he was 15 years old. He graduated from Show Low High School. Valencia attended Northern Arizona University where he earned an undergraduate degree in humanities in 2011. He also received two master's degrees there, one in English – Creative Writing in 2014, and other in English – Literature in 2015. He has also served in the military police for the U.S. Army.

== Career ==
=== Music career ===
Valencia founded the Indie rock band Gorky as a solo project in Show Low, Arizona in 2001. Drummer Ben Holladay joined the band in 2002. Gorky currently consists of its two founding members and bassist Crabdree and guitarist Benjamin Turner The band has self-released three studio albums. The third album was recorded during Valencia's first semester at the David Lynch Graduate School of Cinematic Arts after learning the Transcendental Meditation technique, and released in April 2019 to coincide with the release of his debut nonfiction book, Keep Music Evil: The Brian Jonestown Massacre Story. Also in April, Gorky embarked on a short tour in support of Mathemagician, where Valencia hosted author events and read excerpts from his book.

==== Discography ====
- The Gork...And How To Get It! (2018)
- More Electric Music (2018)
- Mathemagician (2019)

=== Author ===
In 2019, Valencia published the book Keep Music Evil: The Brian Jonestown Massacre Story, a history of The Brian Jonestown Massacre band. The book was featured in the Editors picks of a 2019 Vogue magazine.

=== Acting ===
Valencia made his on-screen acting debut in the 2016 independent crime drama Durant's Never Closes, and later appeared in the art horror Bride of Violence and post-apocalyptic short film The Mad Man Of Miami. In 2019, he enrolled in the David Lynch Graduate School of Cinematic Arts for their screenwriting program at the Maharishi University of Management.

=== Sitgreaves County ===
As early as 2017, to promote Gorky's in-development musical film In The Land Of Good Oaks, Valencia began pushing the idea of a Sitgreaves County secession movement in the southern parts of Navajo and Apache Counties to local Republican groups in Northeastern Arizona. In the story of 'Good Oaks', the character Valencia was to play, Rhys Diaz, was similarly the creator of such a county. The stunt only made it as far as the local newspaper. From 2018 to 2020, as Valencia was in the David Lynch Graduate School of Cinematic Arts MFA in Screenwriting Program developing the screenplay to the film, 'Sitgreaves County' grew from a fizzled publicity stunt to a full-blown populist movement. During this time, Valencia successfully lobbied Rep. Walter Blackman and Sen. Wendy Rogers to each introduce their own Sitgreaves County study committee bills into the Arizona Legislature.

In 2021, Valencia pulled the plug on the final Sitgreaves County bill and revealed his intentions of promoting himself, Gorky, and the film after Navajo Nation President Jonathan Nez and Vice President Myron Lizer issued a formal letter to Governor Doug Ducey appealing to him to veto the bill if it passed, as the Navajo leadership interpreted any Sitgreaves County bill as being racist legislation directed against them.

After issuing an official apology to the Arizona State and Tribal Governments, Phoenix Magazine and The Arizona Republic released articles about the Sitgreaves County publicity stunt. Valencia subsequently released Gorky's 7th album "Sitgreaves County" on July 3, 2021.
