= Valenza (disambiguation) =

Valenza is a comune in Italy.

Valenza may also refer to:

- Tasia Valenza (born 1967), American actress and voice actress
- Tor Alexander Valenza, screenwriter
- Pecetto di Valenza, commune in Piedmont, Italy
