= Medieval Seat Fortress of Suceava =

14th-century castle in Romania

Seat Fortress of Suceava
- Romanian: Cetatea de Scaun a Sucevei
- Suceava, Suceava County, Bukovina, Moldavia in Romania
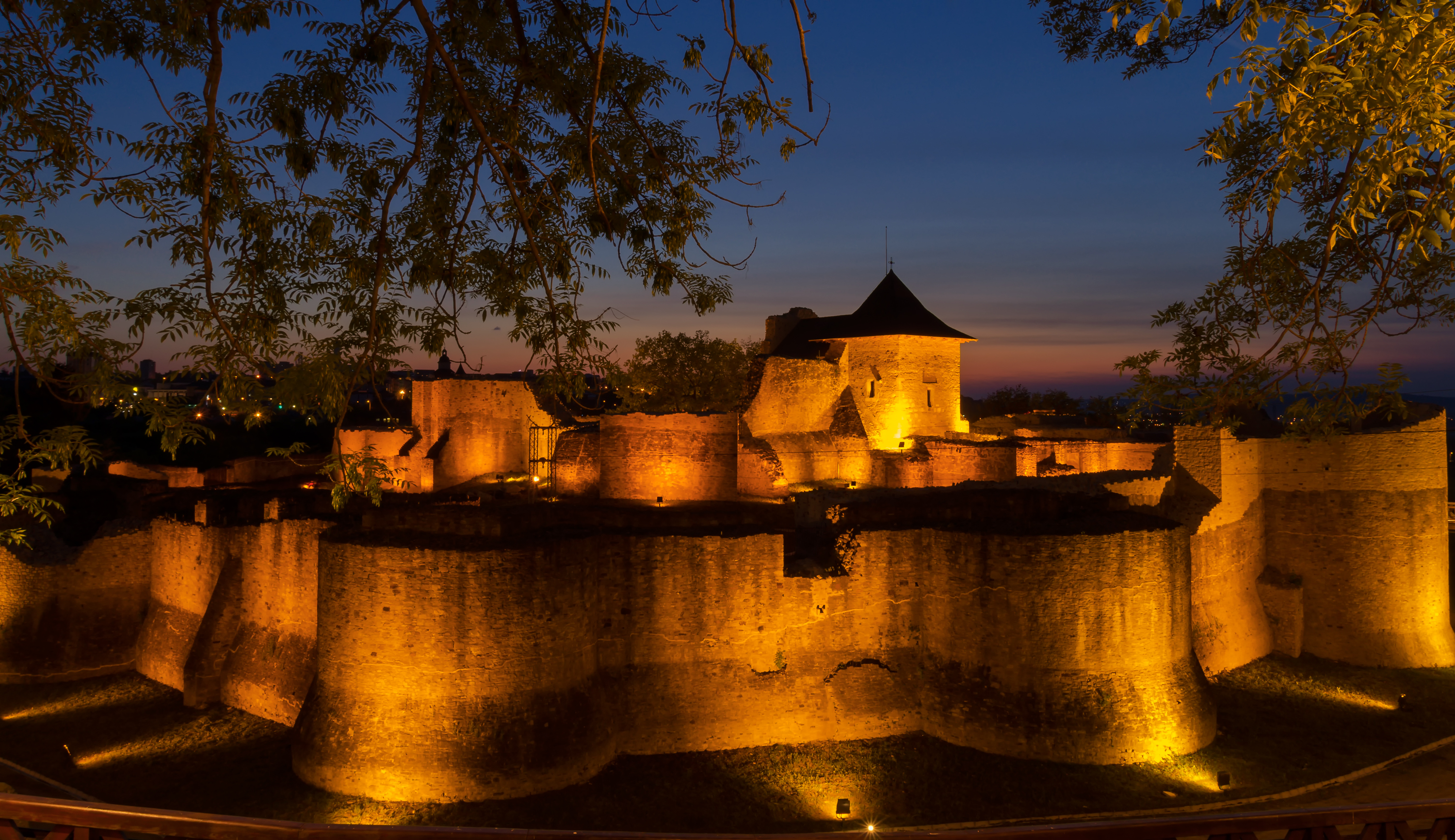
- Suceava Seat Fortress as seen during nighttime (spring 2015)

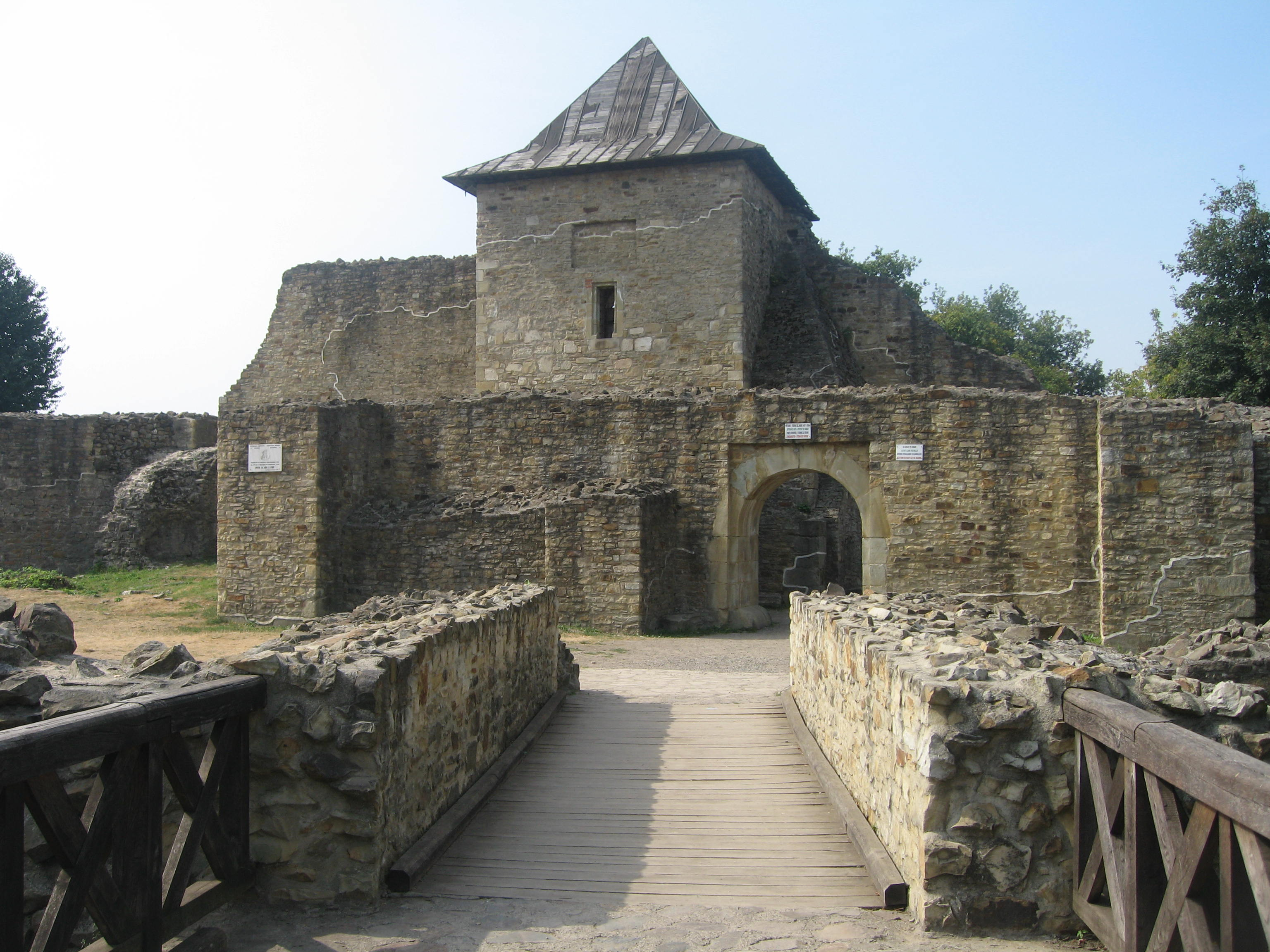
- Entrance within the Medieval Seat Fortress of Suceava, straight from the access bridge, as seen in September 2009. The main keep can be seen in the background as well.

Site information
- Type: Castle/royal fortress (Romanian: Reședință regală)
- Owner: Ministry of Culture
- Condition: Renovated and very well preserved (still undergoing partial renovation as of early 2026)
- Website: Official website (in Romanian, English, German, and Hungarian)

Location
- Coordinates: 47.6449°N 26.2703°E

Site history
- Built: Late 14th century
- Built by: Initially built at the orders of Peter I (Romanian: Petru Mușat), later fortified by Stephen III (also known as Stephen the Great; Romanian: Ștefan cel Mare), and subsequently rebuilt by Austrian architect Karl Adolf Romstorfer.
- The royal seat of the Moldavian rulers for centuries during the Late Middle Ages as well as an impressive and imposing medieval stronghold at the crossroads of Central and Eastern Europe which had successfully survived several sieges and was never conquered by its enemies/invaders.

The Medieval Seat Fortress of Suceava (Romanian: Cetatea Medievală de Scaun a Sucevei or Cetatea Sucevei; German: Sotschen Festung, Der Fürstensitz von Suceava, Die Fürstenburg von Suceava, or Festung Suceava) is a fortified castle in the middle-sized town of Suceava, the county seat town of Suceava County, situated in the historical regions of Bukovina and Moldavia, northeastern Romania.

The castle served as the royal seat fortress for the Princes of Moldavia (Romanian: Domnitori or Domni) during the Late Middle Ages. Nowadays, it is a tourist attraction of Suceava. It has been further renovated through a REGIO programme based on European Union (EU) funds. The Medieval Seat Fortress of Suceava is also a historic monument officially listed by the Ministry of Culture of Romania.

== History ==
The castle was built during the late 14th century during the reign of Petru Mușat. It was subsequently more fortified in the time of Alexander I and Stephen III (Romanian: Ștefan cel Mare). During the Late Middle Ages, it was part of a system of medieval strongholds built by the Moldavian monarchs in order to withstand the expansionist threat of the Ottoman Empire. For the time during which the town of Suceava served as the capital of Moldavia, namely between 1388 and 1565, the castle also served as princely residence.

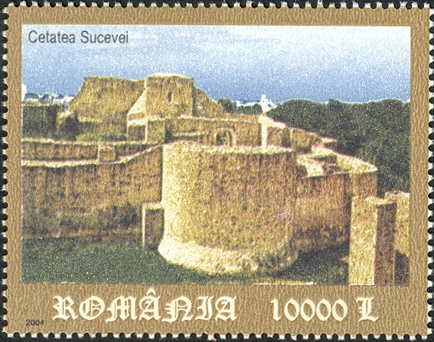
The Medieval Seat Fortress of Suceava (Romanian: Cetatea de Scaun a Sucevei), as depicted on a 2004 Romanian stamp.

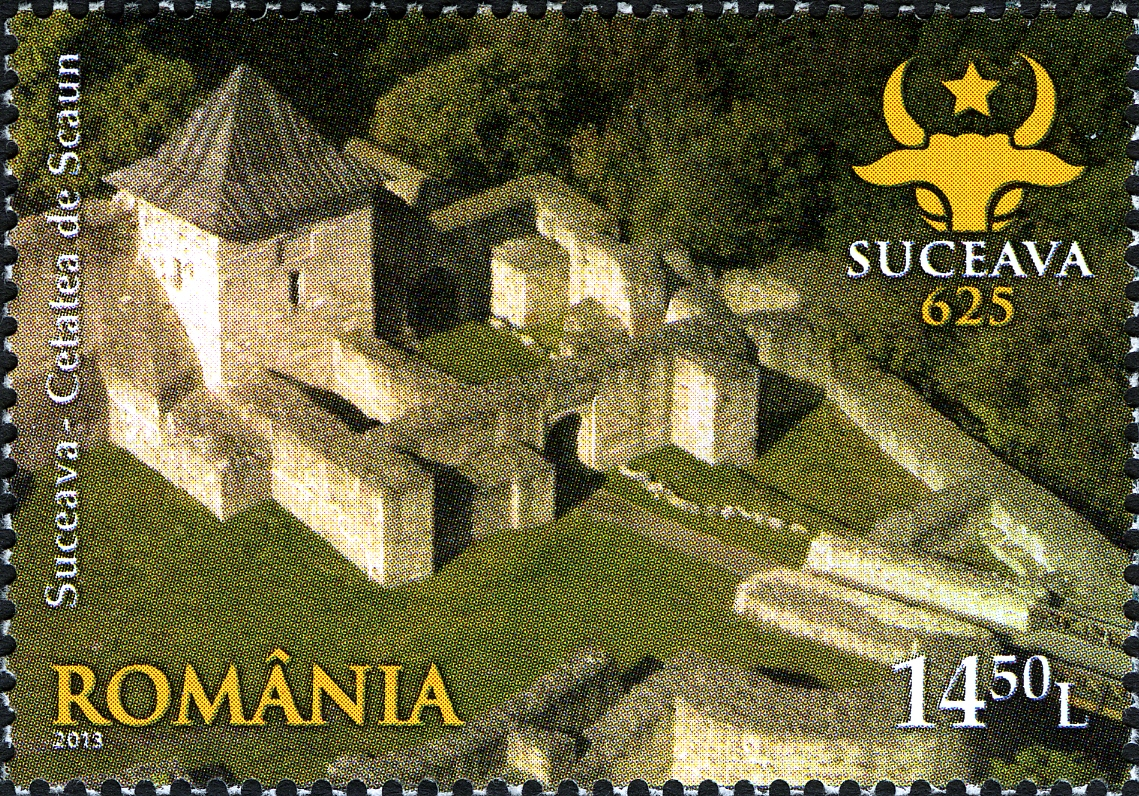
The Medieval Seat Fortress of Suceava, as depicted on a 2013 Romanian stamp, commemorating its 625th anniversary.

Alexandru Lăpușneanu subsequently moved the capital to Iași in 1565 and so the castle lost its status and consequently fell into a long period of decay. Although it has never been conquered by its invaders, regardless from where they stemmed, the castle was destroyed by Dumitrașcu Cantacuzino. Following its destruction, it was abandoned for approximately 300 years.

After the northern highlands of the former medieval Principality of Moldavia were annexed by the Habsburg monarchy following the Treaty of Küçük Kaynarca during the late 18th century and became henceforth known as Bukovina (German: Bukowina or Buchenland), the castle was eventually repaired by Austrian architect Karl Adolf Romstorfer, who raised its defensive walls from ruin and also worked on its keep during the late 19th century and early 20th century.

During the late 20th century, more specifically throughout the 1960s (i.e. in communism), there have also been a series of restoration and consolidation works carried out on the surface of the castle.

In 2015 work started on restoration, consolidation of the Suceava Princely Citadel with funds from the European Union. Access paths from the Suceava city center are completed, easing access to pedestrians. The works are expected to be completed in 2026.

== Heraldic on display in the castle ==
The heraldic symbols on display in the castle pertain to the Moldavian nobility of the Late Middle Ages (Romanian: Evul Mediu târziu), more specifically to the Moldavian rulers. The most common heraldry is the coat of arms of Stephen III the Great (who was also given the title Athleta Christi by Pope Sixtus IV for defending Europe against the Ottoman Turks at the Battle of Vaslui in 1475).

The coat of arms of Stephen the Great

The coat of arms of Stephen the Great, displayed as a round shield

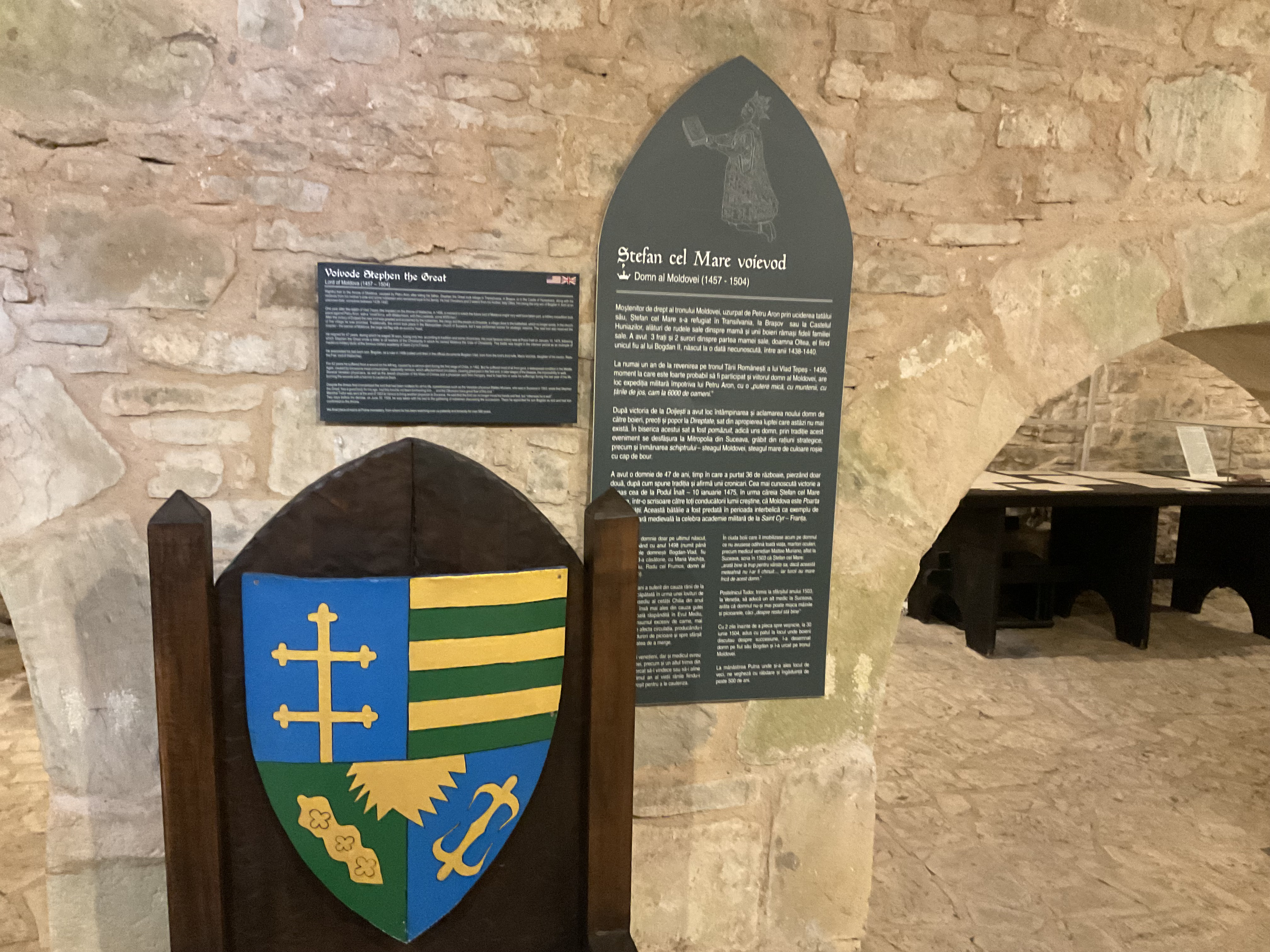
The coat of arms of Stephen the Great displayed within the fortress in the voivodes' hall (Sala Voievozilor in Romanian)

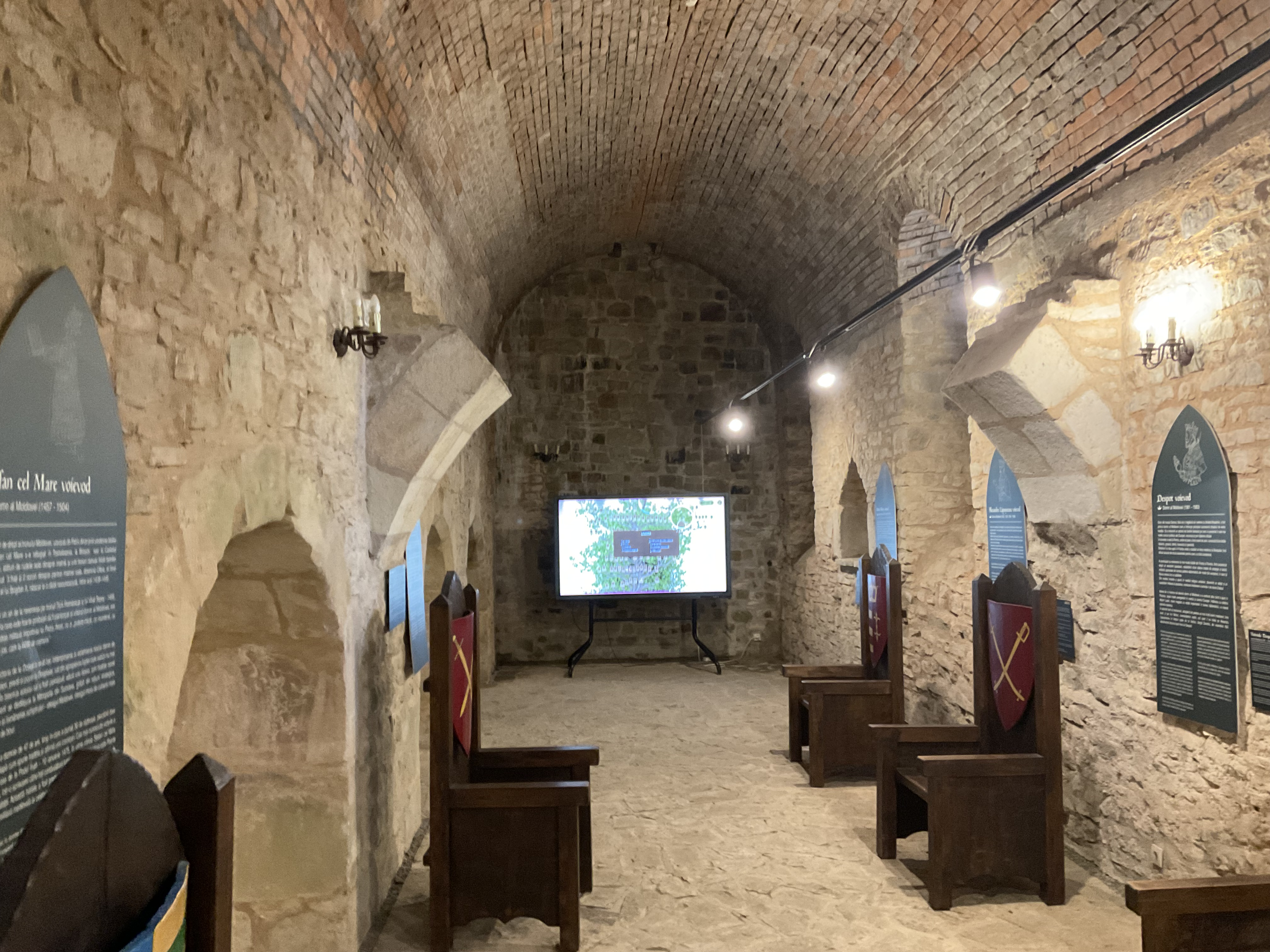
Other historical coat of arms depicted on several wooden thrones within the fortress, namely with the voivodes' hall (Sala Voievozilor in Romanian)

== Digital facilities ==
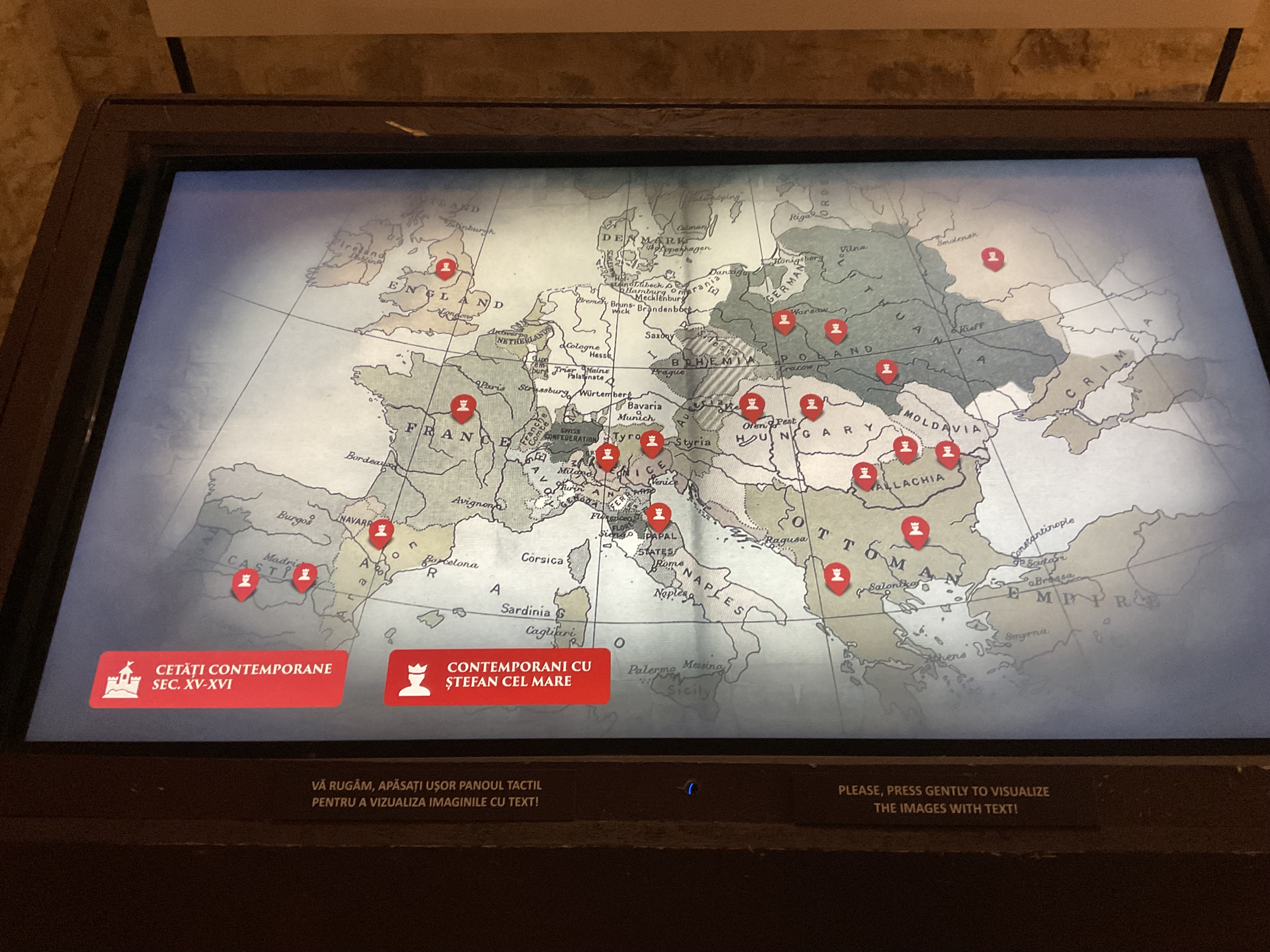
Interactive panel from the voivoides' hall (Sala Voievozilor in Romanian) with the map of Europe during the Middle Ages depicting contemporary castles or fortress with Stephen the Great's reign.

The castle disposes of entertaining digital facilities that enable a real-time simulation of the outfits of its visitors into medieval costumes, ascribing them a medieval title in the process (e.g. soldier or merchant).

== Visiting areas ==
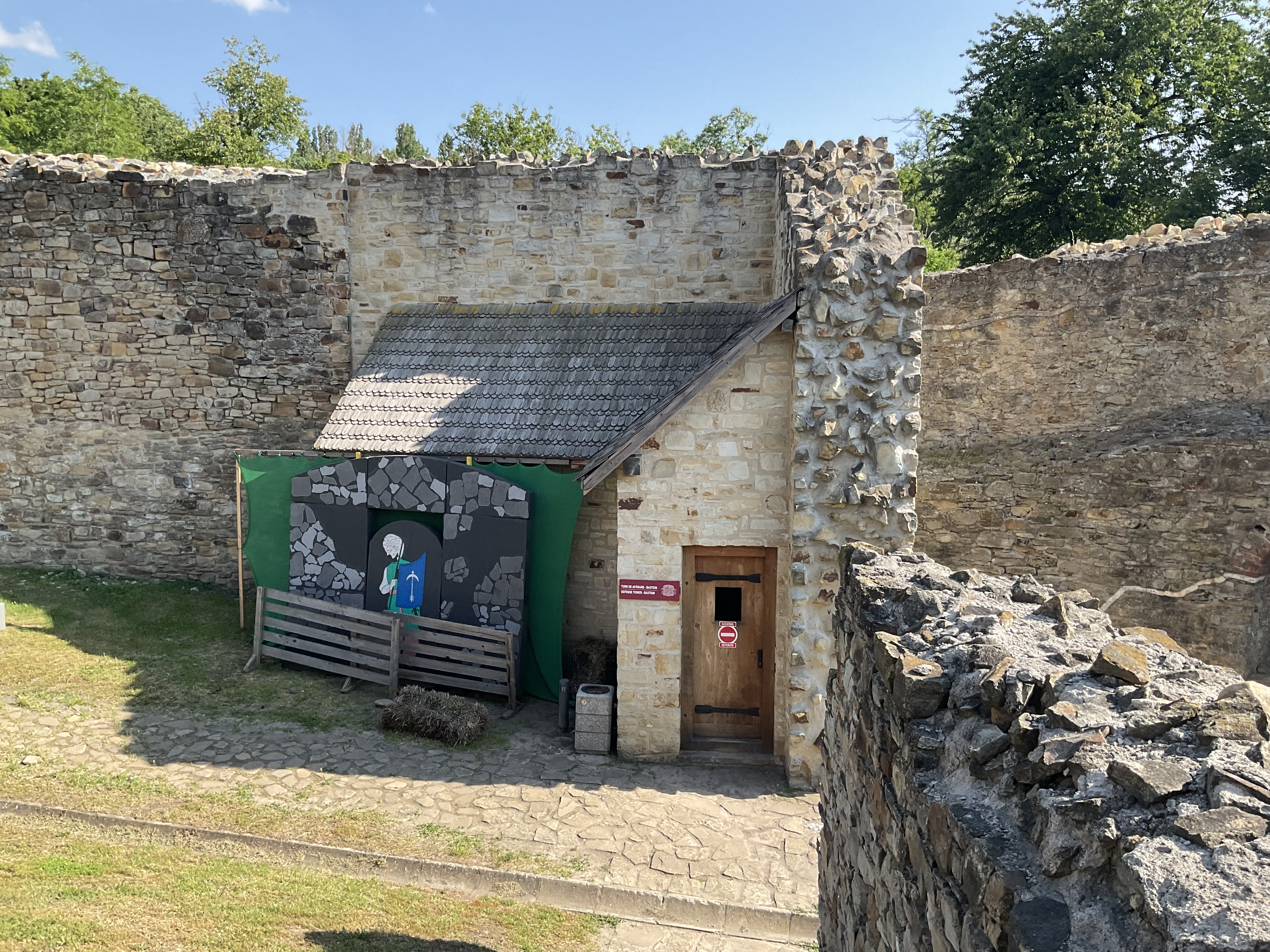
A defence tower chamber inside the inner courtyard of the medieval Seat Fortress of Suceava, as seen in June, 2025. The chamber itself is not open to access.

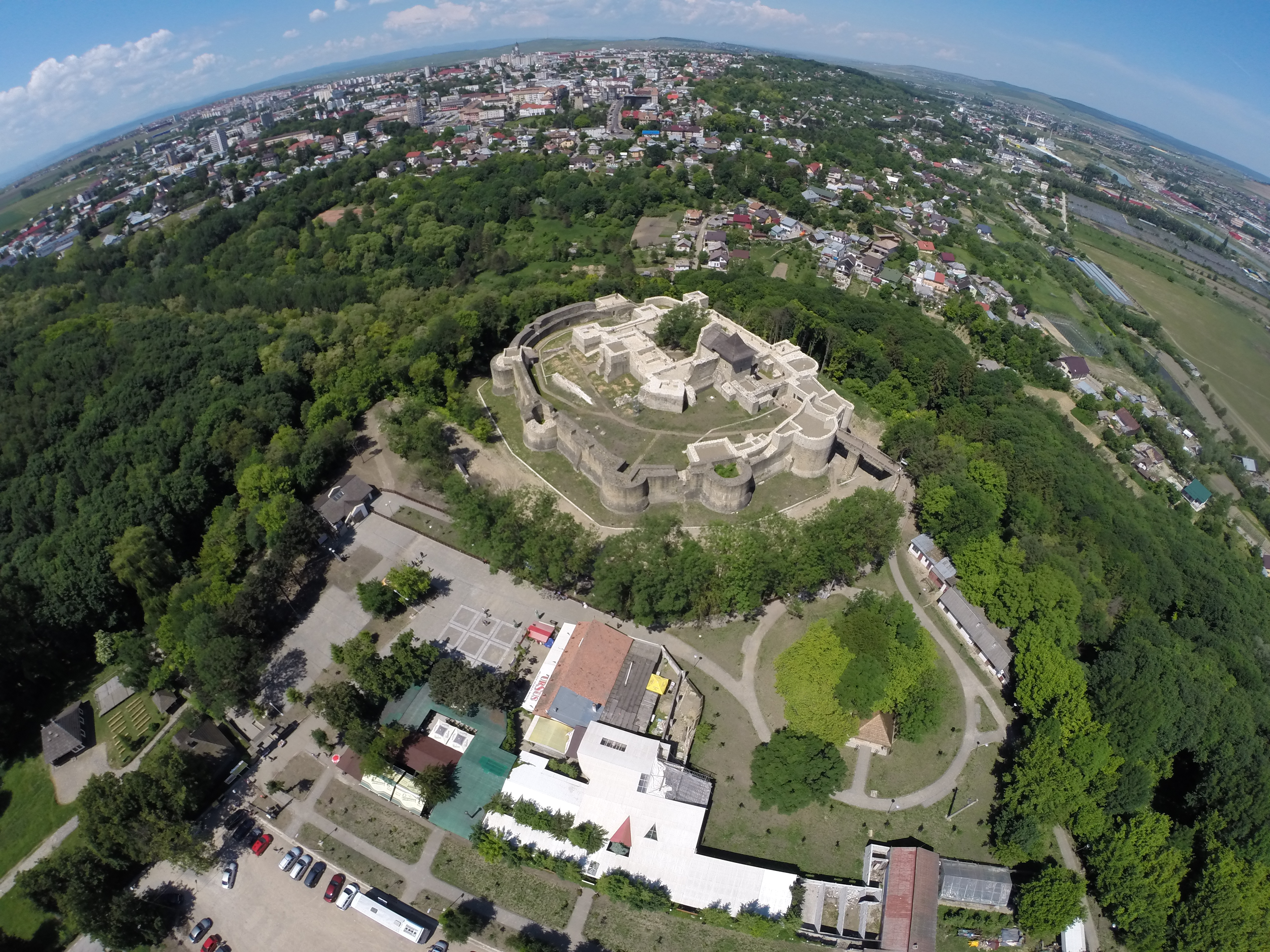
Elevated view of the Medieval Seat Fortress of Suceava (2015)

The castle can be visited both in the inner courtyard, in the main keep, in the cellars, in the throne room, and on the surrounding defensive walls.

== Geography ==
The Medieval Seat Fortress of Suceava is located on the eastern ridge of the town of Suceava, overlooking the town. It was constructed on a plateau that rises 70 metres above the river meadow of Suceava (Romanian: Lunca Sucevei). It is surrounded by trees on all sides and by a nearby forest both to the west and east.

== Bucovina Rock Castle ==
Aside from its tourist attraction and historical statuses, the Medieval Seat Fortress of Suceava had also been the site of a yearly rock music festival entitled Bucovina Rock Castle in the recent past, a festival where both national and international rock artists and bands performed. A major international rock artist who had performed at the Bucovina Rock Castle was Dutch jazz fusion and progressive rock guitarist Jan Akkerman of Focus in 2015. Another rock band which previously performed at Bucovina Rock Castle was Nazareth in 2014.

== Ștefan cel Mare Medieval Art Festival ==
On a yearly basis, the Ștefan cel Mare medieval art festival is held in the fortress. The festival consists of jousts, pyrotechnic and laser shows, medieval singing and dancing, fight scenes, drama plays for children, archery, stunts with horses, interactive activities, or various contests.

== Trivia ==
The former football club FC Cetatea Suceava was named in honour of the castle. The club was active from 2004 until 2010 and played on the local Areni stadium.

== Gallery ==
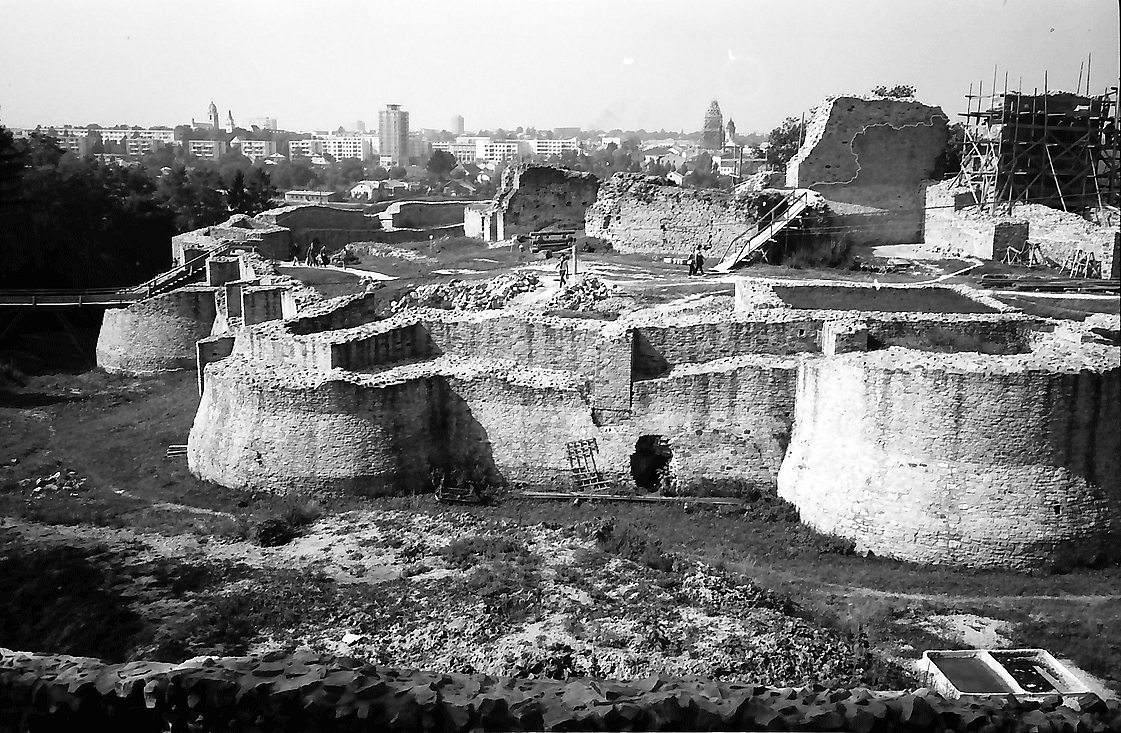
The Seat Fortress of Suceava, as seen in 1971

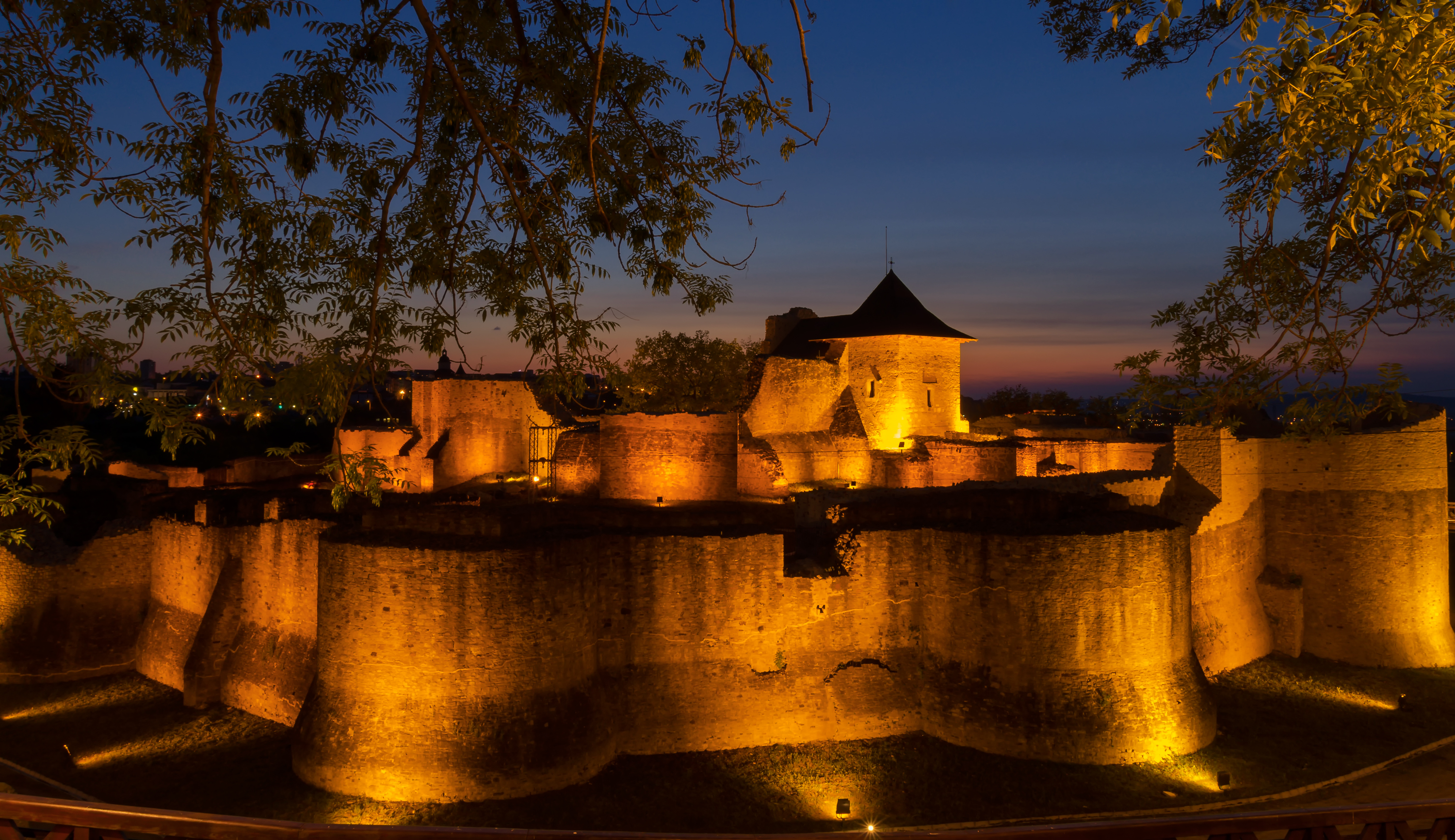
The Seat Fortress of Suceava at night (2015)

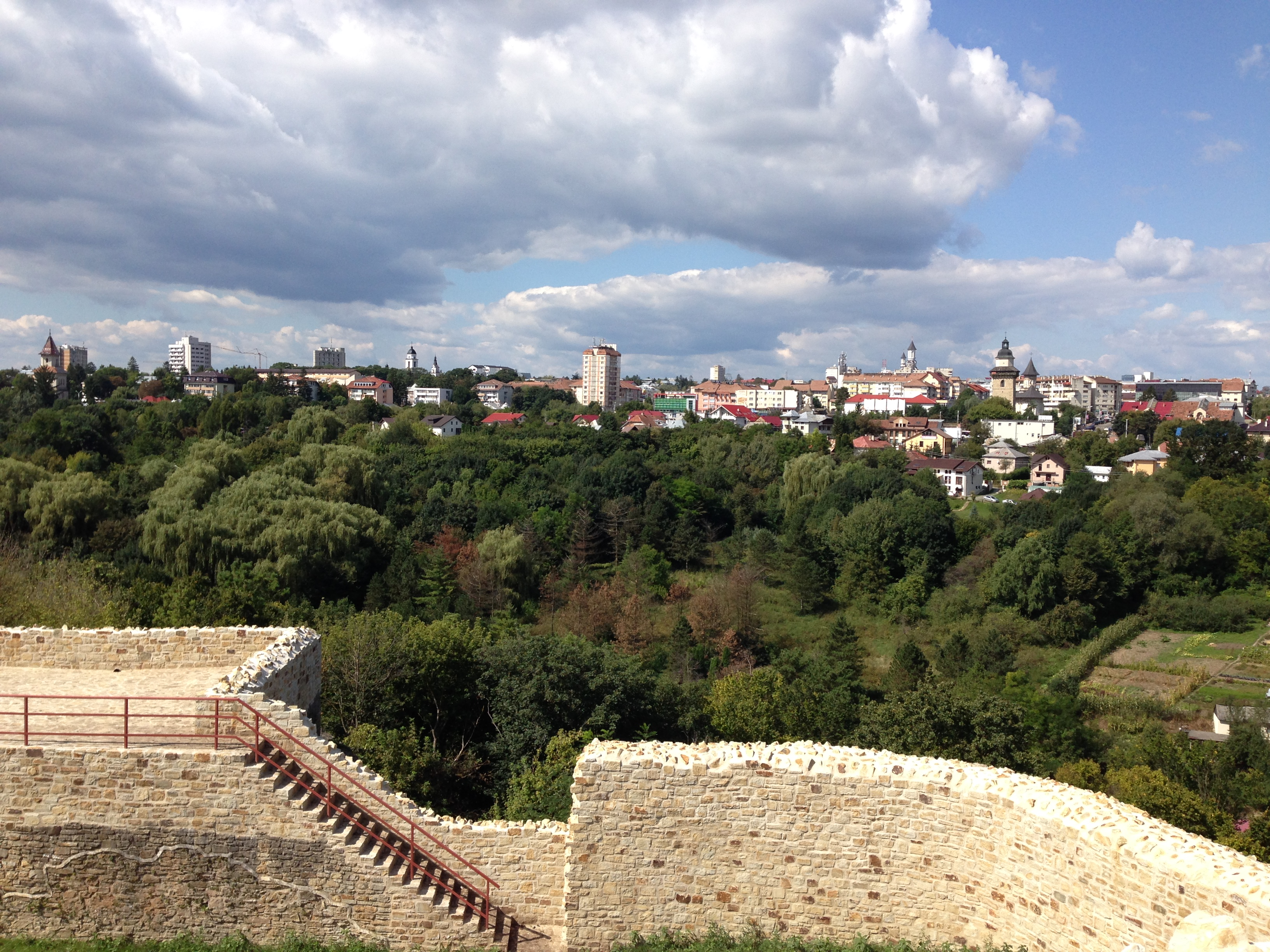
The town of Suceava as seen from the Seat Fortress of Suceava during day time in 2014

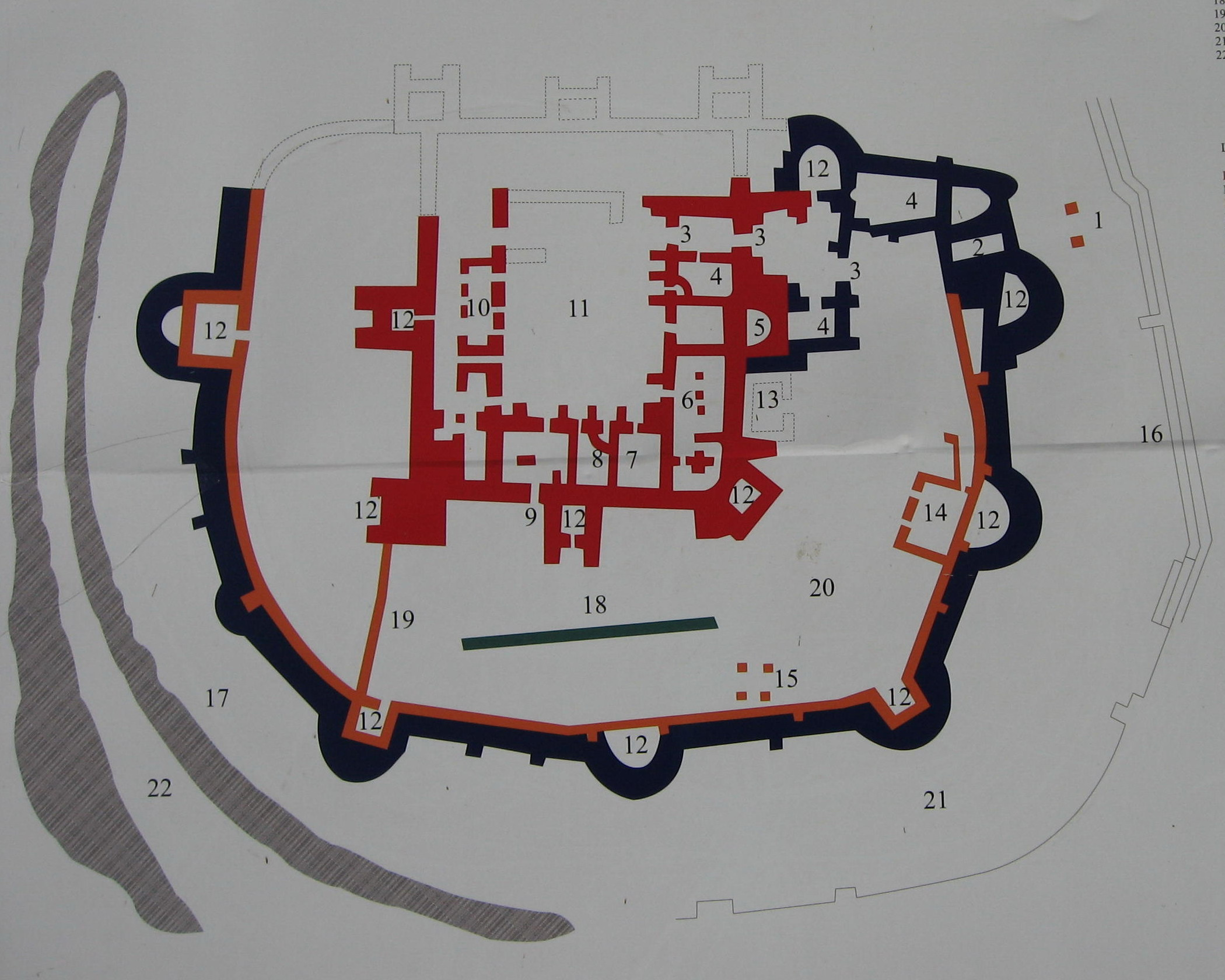
The construction plan of the Seat Fortress of Suceava on display on a panel before the entrance in the fortress

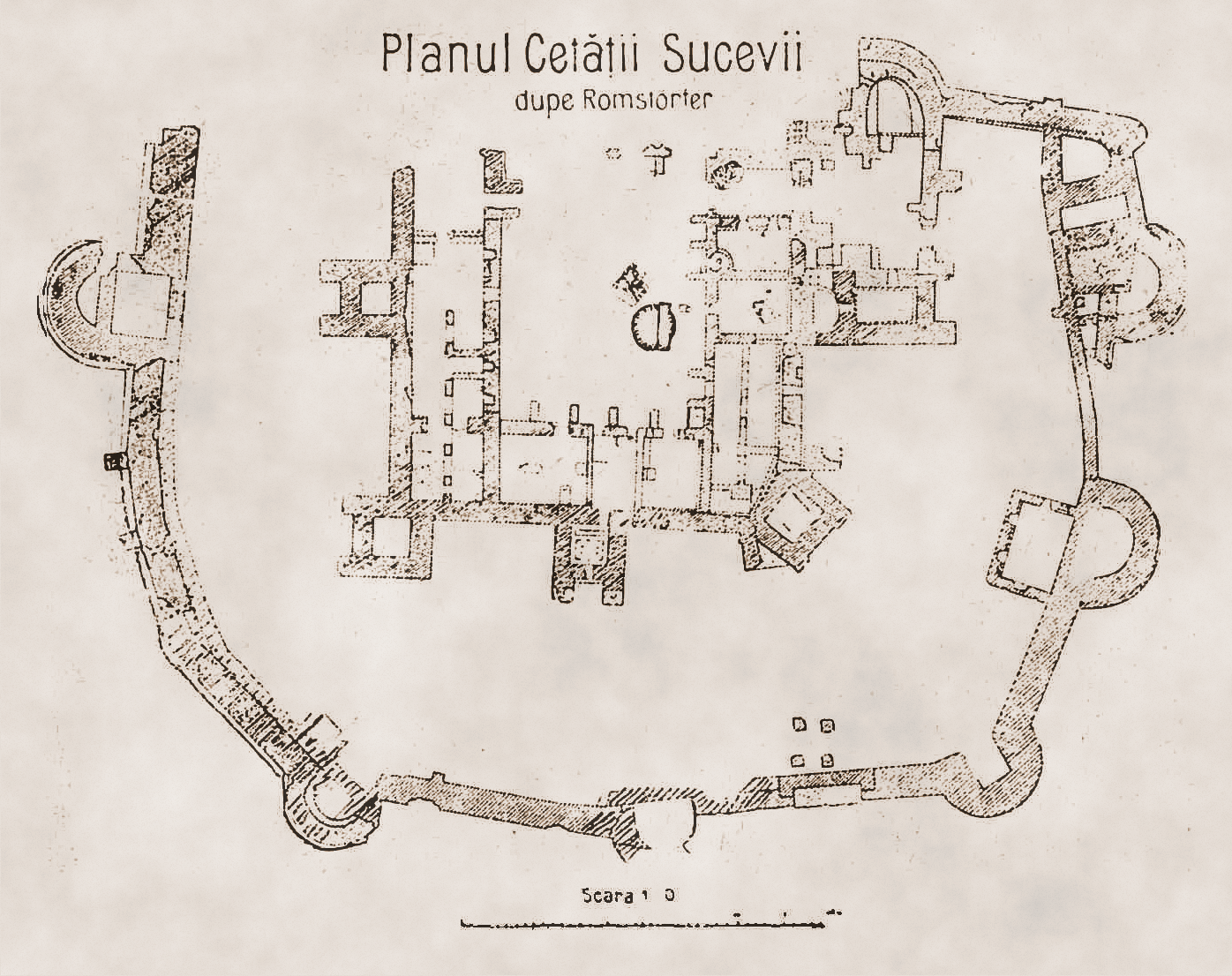
Old sketch depicting the fortress' plan according to Austrian architect Karl Adolf Romstorfer, in a book by Romanian military historian Radu R. Rosetti

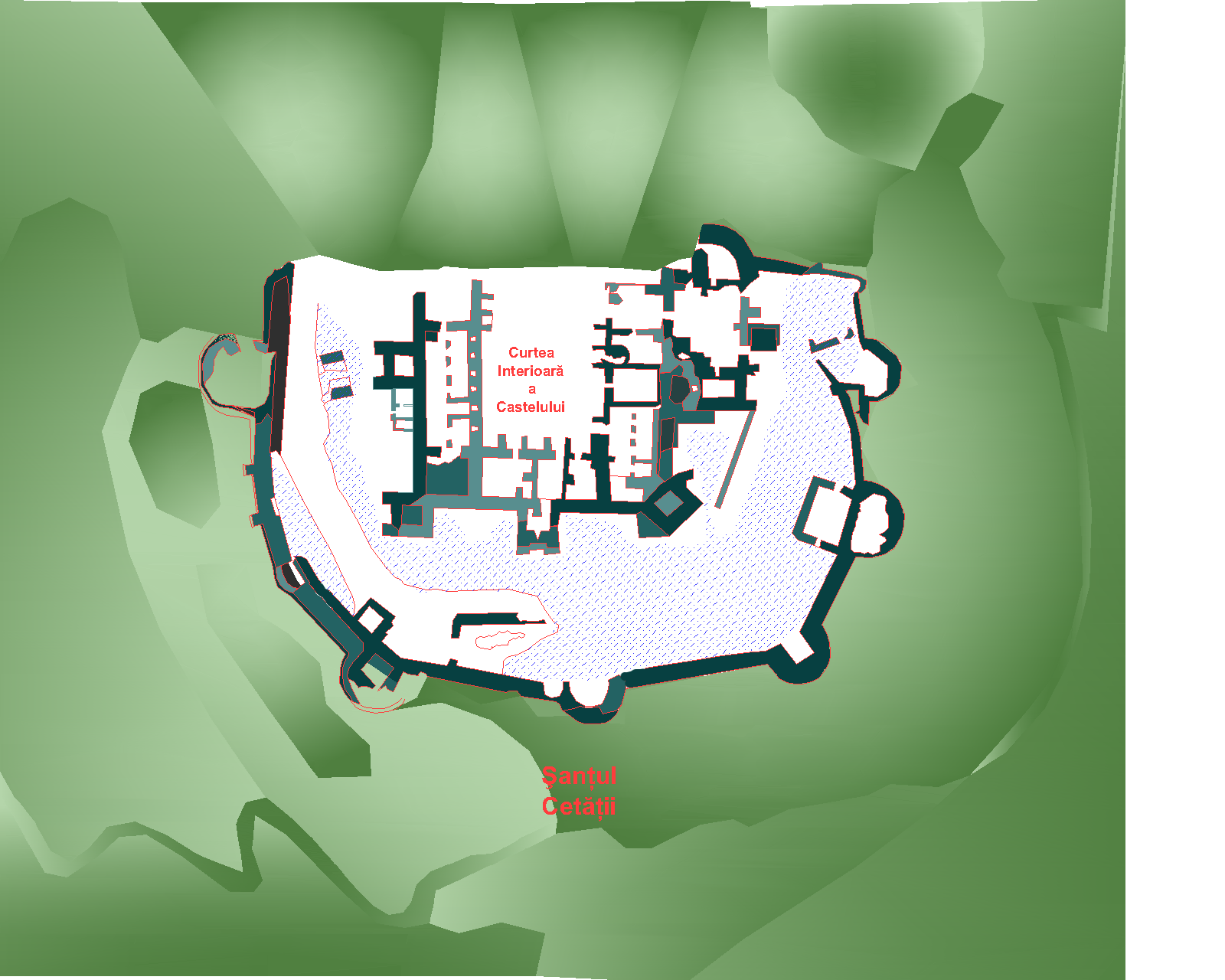
A modern, digital representation of the 1901 plan of the fortress according to Austrian architect Karl Adolf Romstorfer

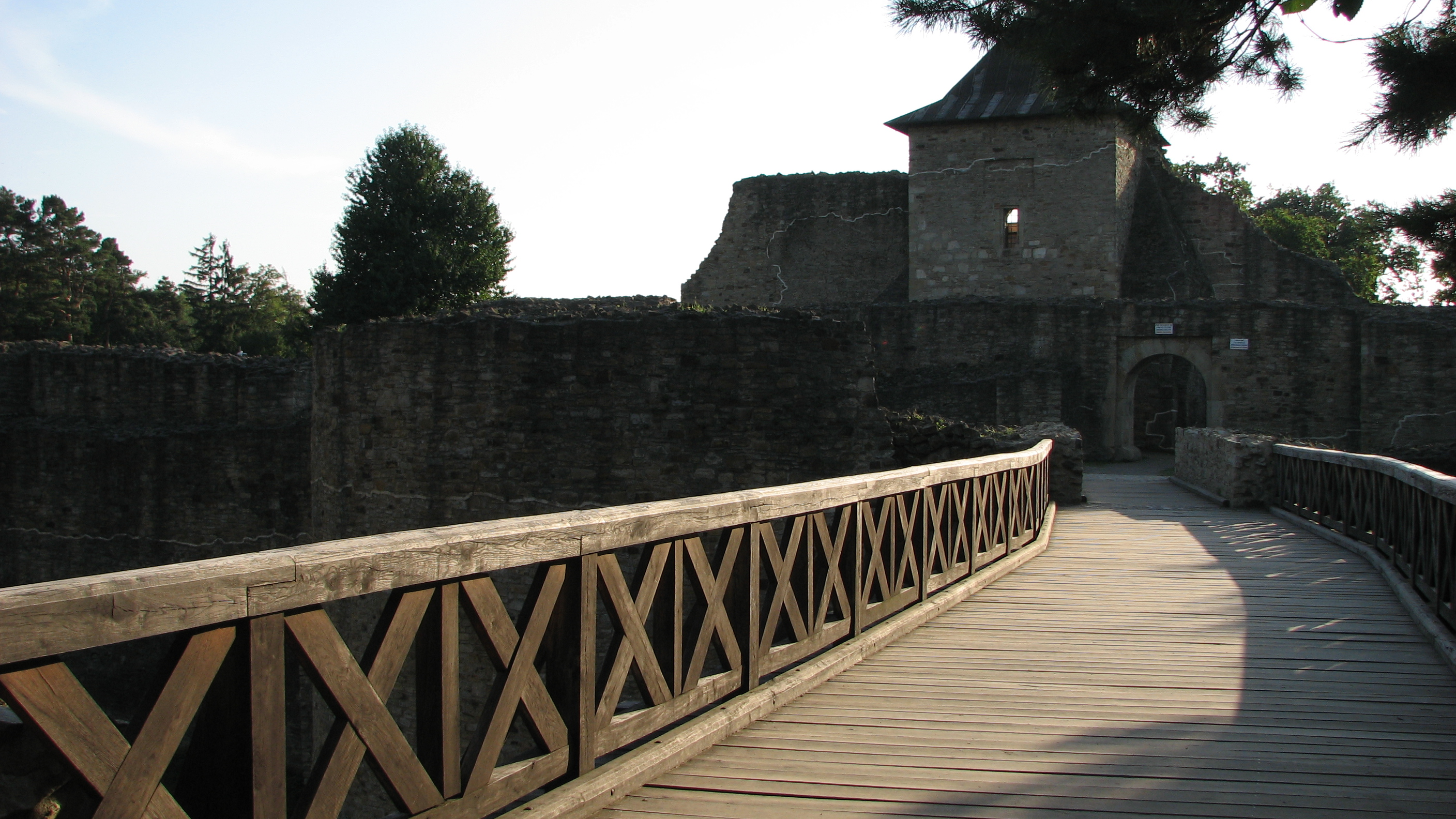
The access bridge of the fortress (2007)

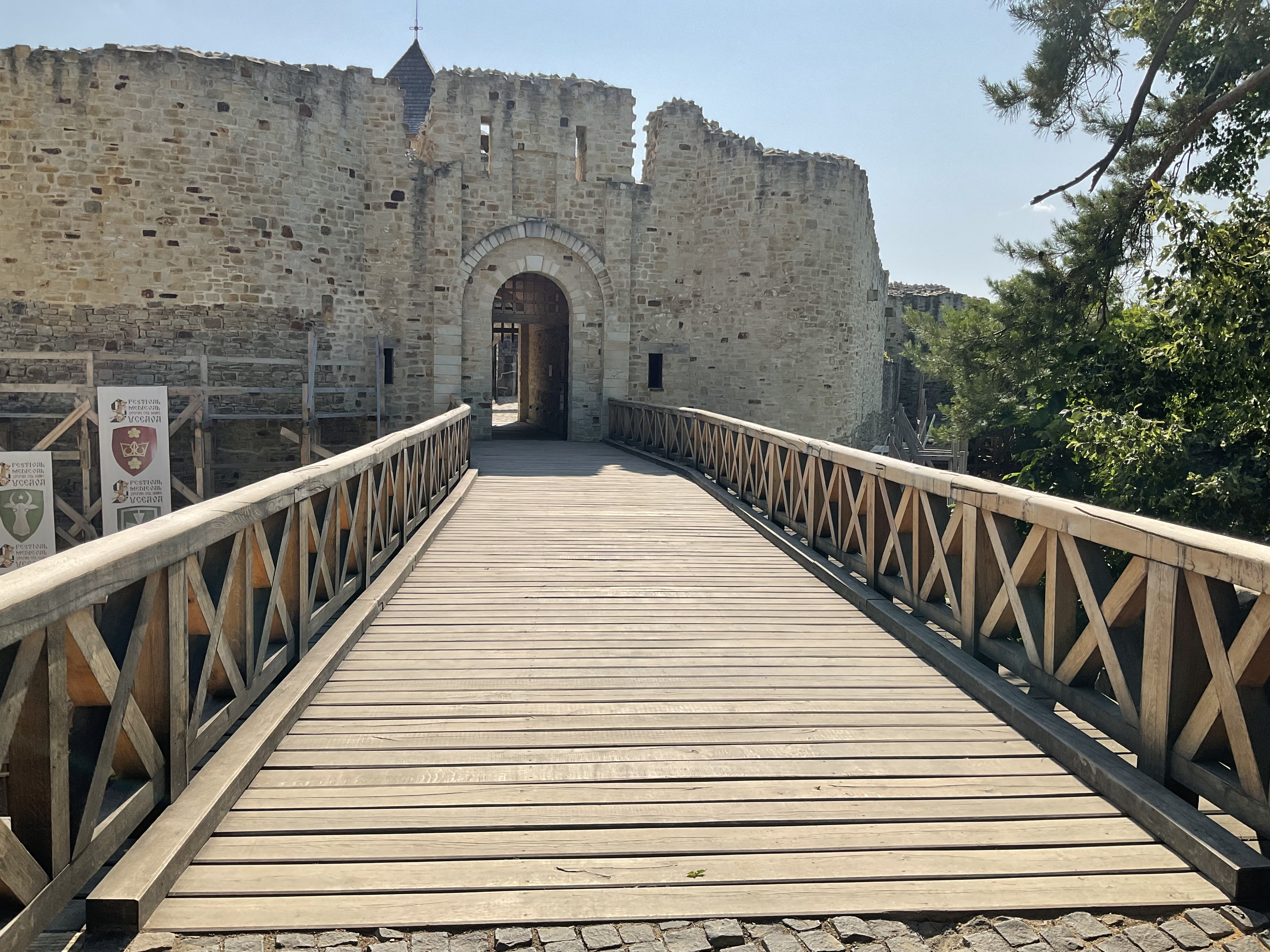
The entrance within the fortress with its portcullis, as seen in July, 2025

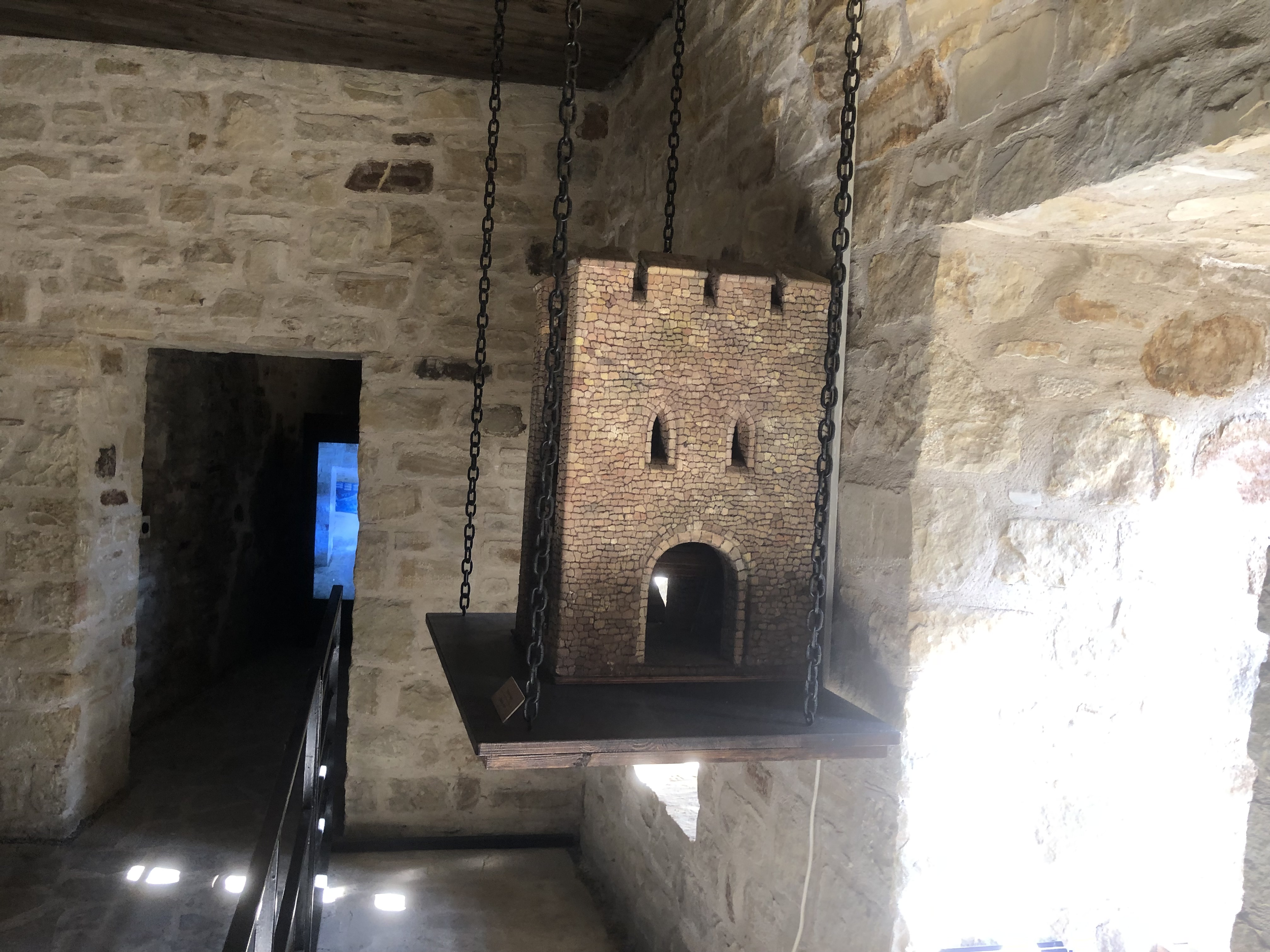
Miniature of the bastion tower in one of the chambers of the fortress

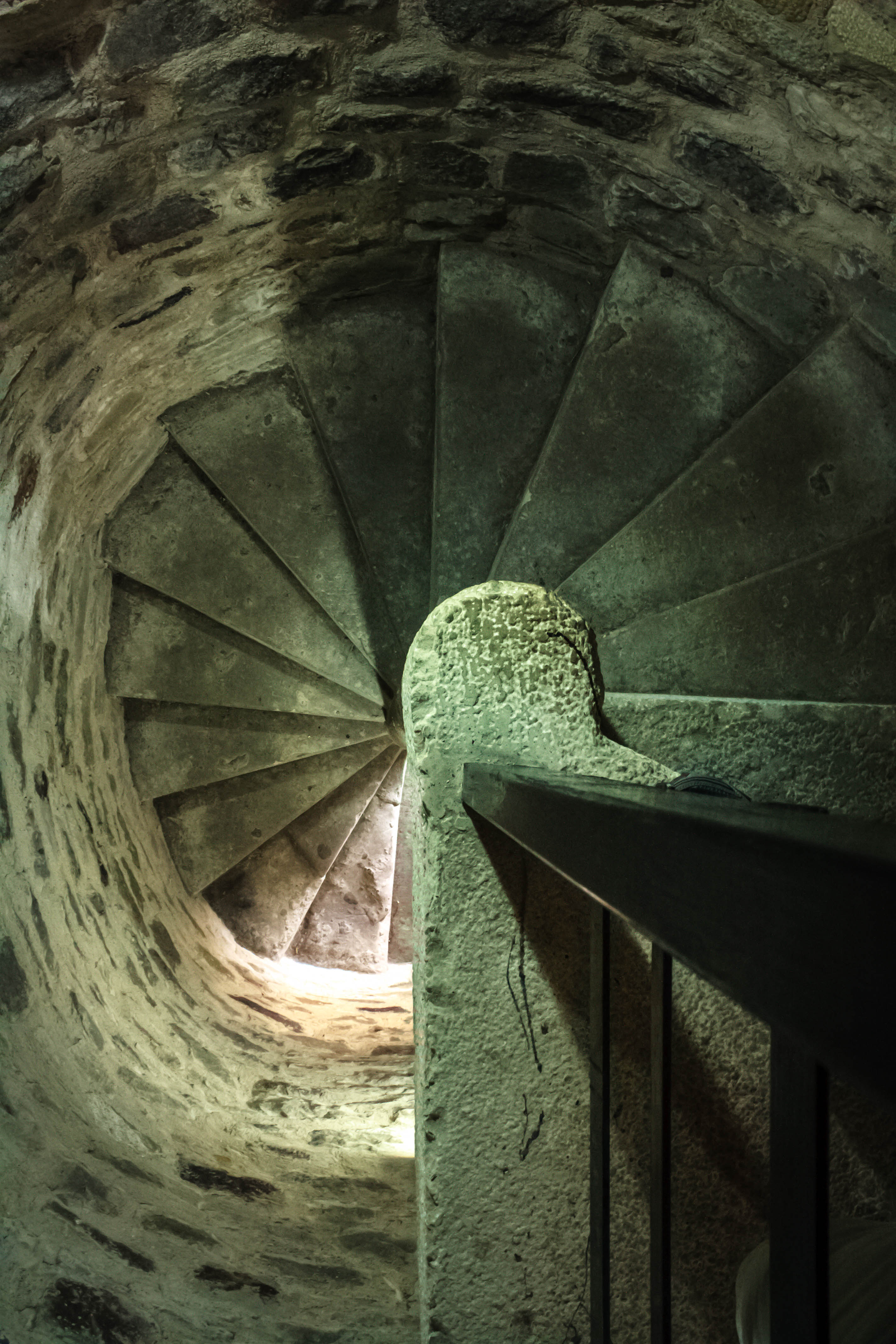
The spiral stairs of Petru Mușat fort inside the fortress (2016)
