= Danubius Arena =

Arena in Tulcea, Romania

Coordinates: 45.1802°N 28.7911°E

- Address: 41 Isaccei Street
- Location: Tulcea, Romania
- Owner: Tulcea County Council
- Capacity: 4,670
- Type: Arena

Construction
- Groundbreaking: 2022
- Opened: 2026
- Cost: €24.35 million
- Architect: Construcții Erbașu
- General contractor: CNI

Danubius Arena is a multi-purpose arena built very close to the Danube bank in Tulcea, Romania.

The arena was inaugurated on July 31, 2026, in conjunction with the 2026 FIBA U18 Women's EuroBasket, Division B.

== See also ==
- List of indoor arenas in Romania
