= Valentia =

Valentia may refer to:

== Places ==
- Valentia Island, off the coast of County Kerry, Ireland
- Valentia (Roman Britain), a province of Roman Britain
- Valence, Drôme, France, known in Roman times as Valentia
- Nuragus, Sardinia, Italy, known in Roman times as Valentia
- Valencia, Spain, known in Roman times as Valentia

== Other uses ==
- Vickers Valentia, a 1920s British flying boat
- Vickers Type 264 Valentia, a British biplane cargo aircraft of the 1930s and '40s
- Valentia (Hagerstown, Maryland), a building on the U.S. National Register of Historic Places
- a synonym for Scotlandia (conodont) (as †Valentia morrochensis Smith 1907), an extinct genus of conodonts in the family Prioniodinidae
- Viscount Valentia, a title in the Peerage of Ireland
- Valentia, a 2013 album by Calibre (musician)

== See also ==
- Valencia (disambiguation)
