= Sala Polivalentă (Constanța) =

Arena in Constanța, Romania

- Interactive map of Sala Polivalentă
- Address: 254 Aurel Vlaicu Blvd.
- Location: Constanța, Romania
- Owner: City of Constanța
- Capacity: 5,000
- Type: Sports Arena
- Surface: 16.000 sqm

Construction
- Groundbreaking: May 2020
- Opened: under construction
- Cost: €23 million
- Architect: Adest Architecture
- General contractors: Euromateria, Aduro Impex, Conpat – Delta CON și Research Consorzio Stabile Societa Consortile

Tenant
- HC Dobrogea Sud (Liga Zimbrilor) (2022–)

The Sala Polivalentă (English: Multi-purpose Arena) is a multi-purpose arena in Constanța, Romania. The Constanța Sports Hall, renamed in honor of the great champion Simona Amânar in 2022, was officially inaugurated on Tuesday, October 8, 2024, through a special ceremony.
