= 2026 FIBA U18 Women's EuroBasket =

International youth basketball tournament

Tournament details
- Host country: Sweden
- City: Stockholm
- Dates: 1–9 August 2026
- Teams: 16 (from 1 confederation)
- Venues: 2 (in 1 host city)

Final positions
- Champions: Spain (7th title)
- Runners-up: France
- Third place: Finland
- Fourth place: Serbia

Tournament statistics
- MVP: (Spain) Somto Okafor
- Top scorer: (Croatia) Olivia Vukoša (24.9 ppg)

Official website
- www.fiba.basketball

The 2026 FIBA U18 Women's EuroBasket was the 41st edition of the European basketball championship for women's under-18 national teams. The tournament was played in Kista (Stockholm), Sweden, from 1 to 9 August 2026.

This tournament also served as the FIBA Europe's qualifier for the 2027 FIBA Under-19 Women's Basketball World Cup in China, where the top five teams qualified.

Spain secured their seventh overall title with a victory over France in the final, 82–46.

== Participating teams ==
Team	App	Last	Streak	Best placement in the tournament	Prev
Teams maintained from the 2025 edition
Belgium	24th	2025	11	Champions (2011, 2017)	4th
Czech Republic	24th	2025	2	Runners-up (2000)	11th
Croatia	14th	2024	1	Seventh place (2012)	▲3rd, Div. B
Finland	9th	2025	5	Runners-up (2025)	2nd
France	39th	2025	37	Champions (2012, 2016, 2024)	3rd
Germany	22th	2024	1	Champions (2018)	▲2nd, Div. B
Hungary	32nd	2025	10	Runners-up (1979, 2019)	9th
Italy	38th	2025	18	Champions (1994, 2010, 2019)	6th
Latvia	13th	2025	9	Fourth place (2016, 2018)	10th
Montenegro	2nd	2025	2	Eightth place (2025)	8th
Poland	36th	2025	7	Runners-up (1975, 1977)	5th
Serbia	17th	2025	4	Champions (2007)	7th
Slovenia	14th	2025	4	Champions (2023)	12th
Spain	36th	2025	33	Champions (1998, 2006, 2009, 2013, 2015, 2025)	1st
Sweden	19th	2021	1	Third place (2006, 2009)	▲1st, Div. B
Turkey	18th	2025	5	Sixth place (2004, 2023)	13th

== First round ==
The draw of the first round was held on 5 February 2026 in Freising, Germany.

In the first round, the teams were drawn into four groups of four. All teams advanced to the playoffs.

All times are local (Central European Summer Time; UTC+2).

=== Group A ===
Pos	Team	Pld	W	L	PF	PA	PD	Pts
1	France	3	3	0	204	153	+51	6
2	Hungary	3	1	2	185	192	−7	4
3	Germany	3	1	2	165	174	−9	4
4	Czech Republic	3	1	2	148	183	−35	4

Source: FIBA

1 August 2026
13:00

Boxscore

France	70–49	Hungary
Scoring by quarter: 15–6, 20–12, 17–12, 18–19

Kistamässan (1), Stockholm
Attendance: 85

1 August 2026
15:30

Boxscore

Germany	51–36	Czech Republic
Scoring by quarter: 12–4, 6–21, 12–7, 21–4

Kistamässan (1), Stockholm
Attendance: 107

2 August 2026
13:15

Boxscore

Hungary	73–56	Germany
Scoring by quarter: 10–12, 23–17, 17–10, 23–17

Kistamässan (2), Stockholm
Attendance: 95

2 August 2026
20:45

Boxscore

Czech Republic	46–69	France
Scoring by quarter: 12–12, 8–19, 16–20, 10–18

Kistamässan (2), Stockholm
Attendance: 83

3 August 2026
15:30

Boxscore

France	65–58	Germany
Scoring by quarter: 16–17, 19–13, 14–13, 16–15

Kistamässan (1), Stockholm
Attendance: 100

3 August 2026
18:15

Boxscore

Czech Republic	66–63	Hungary
Scoring by quarter: 22–13, 19–12, 14–13, 11–25

Kistamässan (2), Stockholm
Attendance: 58

=== Group B ===
Pos	Team	Pld	W	L	PF	PA	PD	Pts
1	Belgium	3	3	0	218	206	+12	6
2	Finland	3	2	1	231	213	+18	5
3	Italy	3	1	2	212	216	−4	4
4	Sweden (H)	3	0	3	232	258	−26	3

Source: FIBA
(H) Hosts

1 August 2026
18:00

Boxscore

Sweden	75–84	Italy
Scoring by quarter: 18–27, 16–20, 22–16, 19–21

Kistamässan (1), Stockholm
Attendance: 235

1 August 2026
20:30

Boxscore

Finland	65–69	Belgium
Scoring by quarter: 11–21, 21–19, 13–17, 20–12

Kistamässan (1), Stockholm
Attendance: 82

2 August 2026
15:45

Boxscore

Italy	66–78	Finland
Scoring by quarter: 12–25, 19–11, 16–23, 19–19

Kistamässan (2), Stockholm
Attendance: 103

2 August 2026
18:00

Boxscore

Belgium	86–79	Sweden
Scoring by quarter: 27–18, 15–13, 21–13, 23–35

Kistamässan (1), Stockholm
Attendance: 127

3 August 2026
13:15

Boxscore

Italy	62–63	Belgium
Scoring by quarter: 15–13, 12–16, 15–17, 20–17

Kistamässan (2), Stockholm
Attendance: 115

3 August 2026
18:00

Boxscore

Finland	88–78	Sweden
Scoring by quarter: 25–21, 22–15, 19–22, 22–20

Kistamässan (1), Stockholm
Attendance: 250

=== Group C ===
Pos	Team	Pld	W	L	PF	PA	PD	Pts
1	Spain	3	3	0	229	100	+129	6
2	Slovenia	3	1	2	165	207	−42	4 (Note: Head-to-head points: SLO 3 pts, TUR 3 pts, MNE 3 pts. Head-to-head point difference: SLO +7, TUR +7, MNE −14. Head-to-head match between two teams: SLO v. TUR 62–53.)
3	Turkey	3	1	2	154	179	−25	4
4	Montenegro	3	1	2	168	230	−62	4

Source: FIBA
Notes:

1 August 2026
15:45

Boxscore

Montenegro	55–71	Turkey
Scoring by quarter: 14–22, 17–11, 7–24, 17–14

Kistamässan (2), Stockholm
Attendance: 67

1 August 2026
18:15

Boxscore

Spain	80–31	Slovenia
Scoring by quarter: 15–6, 19–7, 29–12, 17–6

Kistamässan (2), Stockholm
Attendance: 75

2 August 2026
13:00

Boxscore

Turkey	30–62	Spain
Scoring by quarter: 3–13, 9–17, 9–18, 9–14

Kistamässan (1), Stockholm
Attendance: 68

2 August 2026
20:30

Boxscore

Slovenia	72–74	Montenegro
Scoring by quarter: 14–14, 13–20, 23–18, 22–22

Kistamässan (1), Stockholm
Attendance: 40

3 August 2026
15:45

Boxscore

Spain	87–39	Montenegro
Scoring by quarter: 27-10, 26-8, 23-9, 11-12

Kistamässan (2), Stockholm
Attendance: 43

3 August 2026
20:45

Boxscore

Turkey	53–62	Slovenia
Scoring by quarter: 10-20, 11-14, 17-14, 15-14

Kistamässan (2), Stockholm
Attendance: 65

=== Group D ===
Pos	Team	Pld	W	L	PF	PA	PD	Pts
1	Poland	3	3	0	233	198	+35	6
2	Serbia	3	2	1	209	186	+23	5
3	Latvia	3	1	2	202	201	+1	4
4	Croatia	3	0	3	191	250	−59	3

Source: FIBA

1 August 2026
12:15

Boxscore

Serbia	52–75	Poland
Scoring by quarter: 15–26, 6–23, 16–9, 15–17

Kistamässan (2), Stockholm
Attendance: 95

1 August 2026
20:45

Boxscore

Croatia	64–72	Latvia
Scoring by quarter: 14–22, 17–24, 16–9, 17–17

Kistamässan (2), Stockholm
Attendance: 88

2 August 2026
15:30

Boxscore

Poland	85–76	Croatia
Scoring by quarter: 28–15, 25–14, 19–23, 13–24

Kistamässan (1), Stockholm
Attendance: 85

2 August 2026
18:15

Boxscore

Latvia	60–64	Serbia
Scoring by quarter: 14–10, 18–14, 22–18, 6–22

Kistamässan (2), Stockholm
Attendance: 70

3 August 2026
13:00

Boxscore

Latvia	70–73	Poland
Scoring by quarter: 19–24, 19–12, 19–27, 13–10

Kistamässan (1), Stockholm
Attendance: 100

3 August 2026
20:30

Boxscore

Serbia	93–51	Croatia
Scoring by quarter: 23–17, 15–13, 29–10, 26–11

Kistamässan (1), Stockholm
Attendance: 45

== Final round ==
=== Main bracket ===
Round of 16
5 August
A1 France	71
B4 Sweden	50
5 August
C2 Slovenia	48
D3 Latvia	54
5 August
B2 Finland	73
A3 Germany	56
5 August
D1 Poland	80
C4 Montenegro	74
5 August
A2 Hungary	59
B3 Italy	61
5 August
C1 Spain	100
D4 Croatia	25
5 August
B1 Belgium	72
A4 Czech Republic	57
5 August
D2 Serbia	70
C3 Turkey	67

Quarterfinals
6 August
France	73
Latvia	57
6 August
Finland	78
Poland	63
6 August
Italy	41
Spain	95
6 August
Belgium	68
Serbia	76

Semifinals
8 August
France	82
Finland	62
8 August
Spain	79
Serbia	56

Final
9 August
France	46
Spain	82
Third place match
9 August
Finland	75
Serbia	52

=== Round of 16 ===
5 August 2026
13:00

Boxscore

Hungary	59–61	Italy
Scoring by quarter: 22–16, 17–9, 9–13, 11–23

Kistamässan (1), Stockholm
Attendance: 107

5 August 2026
13:15

Boxscore

Finland	73–56	Germany
Scoring by quarter: 19–14, 19–13, 20–13, 15–16

Kistamässan (2), Stockholm
Attendance: 80

5 August 2026
15:30

Boxscore

Spain	100–25	Croatia
Scoring by quarter: 27–7, 26–4, 19–6, 28–8

Kistamässan (1), Stockholm
Attendance: 116

5 August 2026
15:45

Boxscore

Poland	80–74	Montenegro
Scoring by quarter: 17–25, 23–22, 20–13, 20–14

Kistamässan (2), Stockholm
Attendance: 85

5 August 2026
18:00

Boxscore

France	71–50	Sweden
Scoring by quarter: 26–17, 20–15, 10–9, 15–9

Kistamässan (1), Stockholm
Attendance: 320

5 August 2026
18:15

Boxscore

Belgium	72–57	Czech Republic
Scoring by quarter: 17–10, 21–14, 19–17, 15–16

Kistamässan (2), Stockholm
Attendance: 68

5 August 2026
20:30

Boxscore

Slovenia	48–54	Latvia
Scoring by quarter: 14–18, 5–11, 12–8, 17–17

Kistamässan (1), Stockholm
Attendance: 102

5 August 2026
20:45

Boxscore

Serbia	70–67	Turkey
Scoring by quarter: 19–18, 22–15, 17–17, 12–17

Kistamässan (2), Stockholm
Attendance: 98

=== 9th–16th place classification ===
9th–16th place quarterfinals
6 August
Sweden	83
Slovenia	91
6 August
Germany	84
Montenegro	70
6 August
Hungary	62
Croatia	70
6 August
Czech Republic	65
Turkey	61

9th–12th place semifinals
8 August
Slovenia	49
Germany	65
8 August
Croatia	66
Czech Republic	73

Ninth place match
9 August
Germany	58
Czech Republic	49
Eleventh place match
9 August
Slovenia	80
Croatia	53

13th–16th place semifinals
8 August
Sweden	66
Montenegro	65
8 August
Hungary	56
Turkey	58

Thirteenth place match
9 August
Sweden	77
Turkey	80
Fifteenth place match
9 August
Montenegro	54
Hungary	87

==== 9th–16th place quarterfinals ====
6 August 2026
13:15

Boxscore

Hungary	62–70	Croatia
Scoring by quarter: 16–13, 20–25, 16–21, 10–11

Kistamässan (2), Stockholm
Attendance: 132

6 August 2026
15:45

Boxscore

Germany	84–70	Montenegro
Scoring by quarter: 24–20, 21–15, 17–20, 22–15

Kistamässan (2), Stockholm
Attendance: 108

6 August 2026
18:15

Boxscore

Sweden	83–91 (OT)	Slovenia
Scoring by quarter: 24–26, 20–17, 18–18, 17–18, Overtime: 4–12

Kistamässan (2), Stockholm
Attendance: 225

6 August 2026
20:45

Boxscore

Czech Republic	65–61	Turkey
Scoring by quarter: 18–15, 16–15, 10–13, 21–18

Kistamässan (2), Stockholm
Attendance: 48

==== 13th–16th place semifinals ====
8 August 2026
13:15

Boxscore

Sweden	66–65	Montenegro
Scoring by quarter: 20-13, 17-20, 16-14, 13-18

Kistamässan (2), Stockholm
Attendance: 172

8 August 2026
15:45

Boxscore

Hungary	56–58	Turkey
Scoring by quarter: 18-20, 14-6, 8-10, 16-22

Kistamässan (2), Stockholm
Attendance: 50

==== Fifteenth place match ====
9 August 2026
10:45

Boxscore

Montenegro	54–87	Hungary
Scoring by quarter: 9–26, 12–26, 11–20, 22–15

Kistamässan (2), Stockholm
Attendance: 42

==== Thirteenth place match ====
9 August 2026
13:00

Boxscore

Sweden	77–80	Turkey
Scoring by quarter: 25–23, 12–20, 23–13, 17–24

Kistamässan (1), Stockholm
Attendance: 205

==== 9th–12th place semifinals ====
8 August 2026
18:15

Boxscore

Slovenia	49–65	Germany

Kistamässan (2), Stockholm

8 August 2026
20:45

Boxscore

Croatia	66–73	Czech Republic

Kistamässan (2), Stockholm

==== Eleventh place match ====
9 August 2026
15:45

Boxscore

Slovenia	80–53	Croatia
Scoring by quarter: 21–13, 22–23, 20–4, 17–13

Kistamässan (2), Stockholm
Attendance: 42

==== Ninth place match ====
9 August 2026
18:15

Boxscore

Germany	58–49	Czech Republic
Scoring by quarter: 8–9, 15–12, 16–12, 19–16

Kistamässan (2), Stockholm
Attendance: 30

=== Quarterfinals ===
6 August 2026
13:00

Boxscore

Italy	41–95	Spain
Scoring by quarter: 10–30, 10–28, 7–20, 14–17

Kistamässan (1), Stockholm
Attendance: 106

6 August 2026
15.30

Boxscore

Finland	78–63	Poland
Scoring by quarter: 23–11, 16–15, 17–20, 22–17

Kistamässan (1), Stockholm
Attendance: 124

6 August 2026
18:00

Boxscore

France	73–57	Latvia
Scoring by quarter: 18–13, 18–21, 21–19, 16–4

Kistamässan (1), Stockholm
Attendance: 120

6 August 2026
20:30

Boxscore

Belgium	68–76	Serbia
Scoring by quarter: 17–14, 16–9, 14–29, 21–24

Kistamässan (1), Stockholm
Attendance: 102

=== 5th–8th place classification ===
5th–8th place semifinals
8 August
Latvia	56
Poland	67
8 August
Italy	55
Belgium	62

Fifth place match
9 August
Poland	55
Belgium	66
Seventh place match
9 August
Latvia	68
Italy	82

==== 5th–8th place semifinals ====
8 August 2026
13:00

Boxscore

Latvia	56–67	Poland
Scoring by quarter: 16-27, 13-13, 13-19, 14-8

Kistamässan (1), Stockholm
Attendance: 80

8 August 2026
15:30

Boxscore

Italy	55–62	Belgium
Scoring by quarter: 14-15, 13-12, 13-24, 15-11

Kistamässan (1), Stockholm
Attendance: 111

==== Seventh place match ====
9 August 2026
13:15

Boxscore

Latvia	68–82	Italy
Scoring by quarter: 19–26, 15–25, 18–18, 16–13

Kistamässan (2), Stockholm
Attendance: 25

==== Fifth place match ====
9 August 2026
15:30

Boxscore

Poland	55–66	Belgium
Scoring by quarter: 21–21, 13–12, 12–15, 9–18

Kistamässan (1), Stockholm
Attendance: 74

=== Semifinals ===
8 August 2026
18:00

Boxscore

France	82–62	Finland

Kistamässan (1), Stockholm

8 August 2026
20:30

Boxscore

Spain	79–56	Serbia

Kistamässan (1), Stockholm

=== Third place match ===
9 August 2026
18:00

Boxscore

Finland	75–52	Serbia
Scoring by quarter: 18–10, 8–18, 27–12, 22–12

Kistamässan (1), Stockholm
Attendance: 352

=== Final ===
9 August 2026
20:30

Boxscore

France	46–82	Spain
Scoring by quarter: 7–24, 17–25, 10–22, 12–11

Kistamässan (1), Stockholm
Attendance: 500

== Final standings ==
Rank	Team	Record
1st place, gold medalist(s)	Spain	7–0
2nd place, silver medalist(s)	France	6–1
3rd place, bronze medalist(s)	Finland	5–2
4th	Serbia	4–3
5th	Belgium	6–1
6th	Poland	5–2
7th	Italy	3–4
8th	Latvia	2–5
9th	Germany	4–3
10th	Czech Republic	3–4
11th	Slovenia	3–4
12th	Croatia	1–6
13th	Turkey	3–4
14th	Sweden	1–6
15th	Hungary	2–5
16th	Montenegro	1–6

Qualified for the 2027 FIBA Under-19 Women's Basketball World Cup
Relegated to the 2027 FIBA U18 Women's EuroBasket Division B
