= Ajša Sivka =

Slovenian basketball player (born 2005)

No. 7 – Kentucky Wildcats
- Position: Guard
- League: Southeastern Conference

Personal information
- Born: 23 November 2005 (age 20) Slovenske Konjice, Slovenia
- Listed height: 1.92 m (6 ft 4 in)

Career information
- College: Kentucky (2026–present)
- WNBA draft: 2025: 1st round, 10th overall pick
- Drafted by: Chicago Sky
- Playing career: 2022–present

Career history
- 2022–2023: Beretta Famila Schio
- 2024–2025: Tarbes Gespe Bigorre
- 2025–2026: Joventut Badalona

Career highlights
- FIBA U18 EuroBasket MVP (2023); Nike Hoop Summit (2024)
- Stats at Basketball Reference
Medals
Women's basketball
Representing Slovenia
FIBA U18 European Championship
Gold medal – first place	2023 Turkey	Team

Ajša Sivka (born 23 November 2005) is a Slovenian college basketball player for Kentucky and a member of Slovenia women's national basketball team. She was selected tenth overall by the Chicago Sky in the 2025 WNBA draft. She previously played for Beretta Famila Schio of the Lega Basket Femminile (LBF), Tarbes Gespe Bigorre, and Joventut Badalona of the Ligue Féminine de Basketball.

== Professional career ==
=== Europe ===
Sivka began her career with Beretta Famila Schio of the Lega Basket Femminile (LBF). During the 2023–24 season, she averaged 5.9 points, 1.9 rebounds, and 1.3 assists per game in 10 games. During the 2023–24 EuroLeague season, she averaged 2.3 points and 2.1 rebounds in 15 games. In March 2024, she was named to the world select team's roster for the 2024 Nike Hoop Summit.

On 20 August 2024, Sivka signed with Tarbes Gespe Bigorre of the Ligue Féminine de Basketball (LFB) for the 2024–25 season. She helped them reach the French League final and Cup semifinals. In 28 league games, she averaged 6.9 points, 2.9 rebounds, and 2.1 assists per game. She also played 8 games in the 2024–25 EuroCup, recording 11.0 points, 3.1 rebounds, 2.9 assists, and 2.0 steals per game.

Sivka signed with Joventut Badalona of the Liga Femenina de Baloncesto for the 2025–26 season.

=== WNBA ===
On 14 April 2025, Sivka was drafted tenth overall by the Chicago Sky in the 2025 WNBA draft. She did not join the team for the 2025 season, choosing instead to focus on her national team duties for EuroBasket Women 2025 and on graduating from high school.

== College career ==
On 6 May 2026, Sivka committed to play college basketball for the Kentucky Wildcats during the 2026–27 season.

== National team career ==
Sivka represented Slovenia at the 2022 FIBA Under-17 Women's Basketball World Cup where she averaged 11.4 points and 5.6 rebounds per game in seven games.

On 13 June 2023, she was selected to represent Slovenia at the EuroBasket Women 2023 where she was the youngest player at the event. During the tournament she averaged eight points, six rebounds and 3.7 assists per game in three games.

She then represented Slovenia at the 2023 FIBA U18 Women's European Championship where she averaged 15.9 points, 9.3 rebounds, 3.0 assists and 2.4 steals per game and won a gold medal. During the championship game against France she scored 20 points and 12 rebounds, and was subsequently named tournament MVP. This was Slovenia's first ever U18 Women's European Championship.
