= Alicia Tournebize =

French basketball player (born 2007)

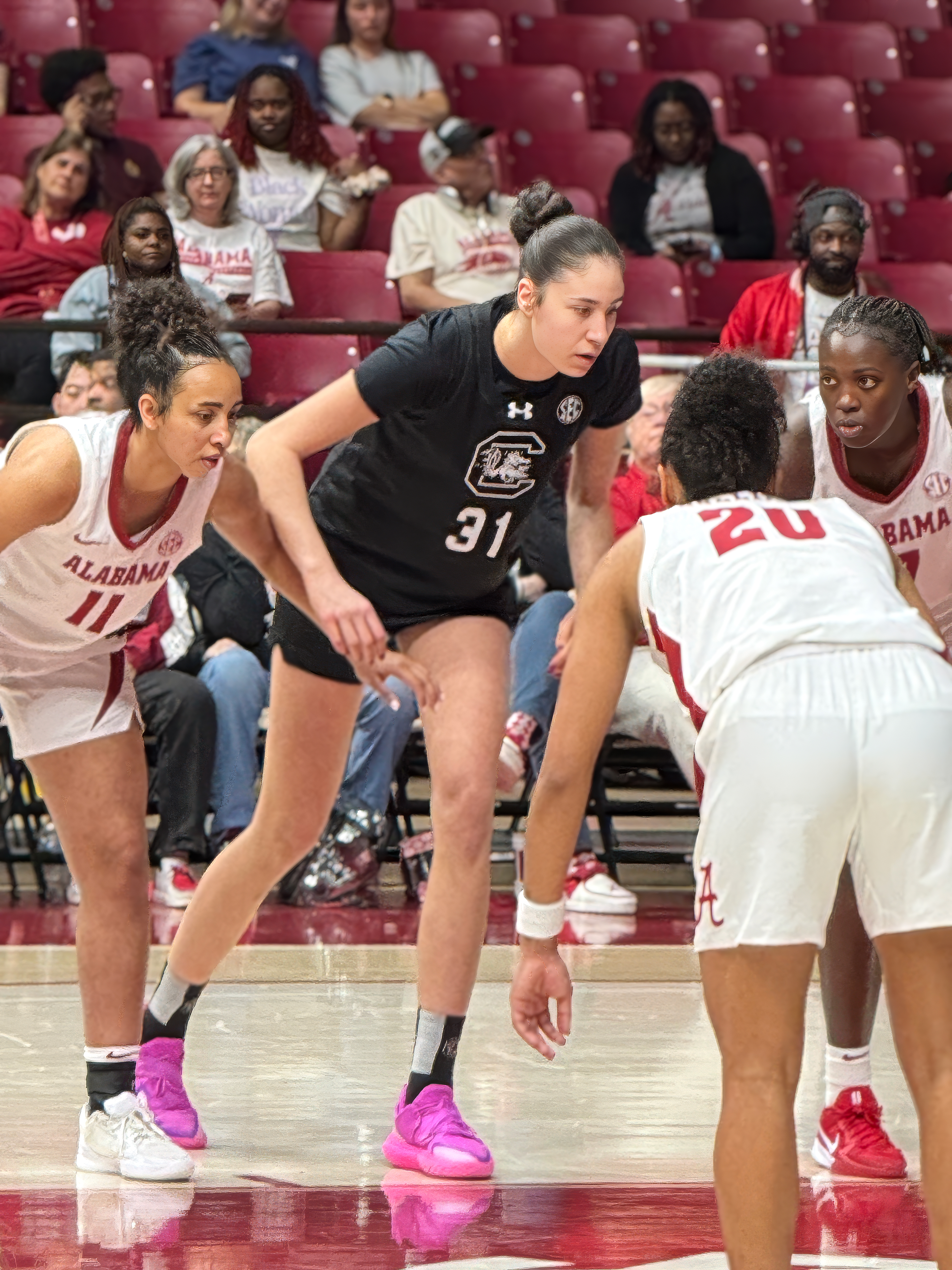
- Tournebize with South Carolina in 2026

No. 31 – South Carolina Gamecocks
- Position: Forward
- League: Southeastern Conference

Personal information
- Born: 21 July 2007 (age 19) Charmeil, France
- Listed height: 6 ft 7 in (2.01 m)

Career information
- High school: Lycée Alain Fournier
- College: South Carolina (2026–present)
- Playing career: 2022–present

Career history
- 2022–2025: Tango Bourges Basket

Alicia Tournebize (born 21 July 2007) is a French college basketball player for South Carolina and member of the France women's national basketball team. She previously played for Tango Bourges Basket of the Ligue Féminine de Basketball (LFB).

== Early life ==
Tournebize is the daughter of former professional basketball player Isabelle Fijalkowski. She attended Lycée Alain Fournier.

== Playing career ==
Tournebize began her career with for Tango Bourges Basket of the Ligue Féminine de Basketball (LFB). On 21 September 2024, she became the first Frenchwoman to perform a dunk in an official game, during an NF2 game between the Bourges and Beaumont, a few weeks before Dominique Malonga in October of the same year. Malonga had been credited with this first for several months, before the video of Tournebize's dunk was published in March 2025.

During the 2024–25 season she appeared in eight games for Tango Bourges Basket and averaged 2.4 points and 1.9 rebounds in 7.6 minutes per game. On 22 December 2025, Tournebize announced she would join South Carolina following the holiday break in January 2026, and begin classes at the start of the spring 2026 semester. She made her collegiate debut on 15 January 2026 against Texas. During the 2025–26 season, she averaged 4.0 points, 3.4 rebounds, and 0.4 assists in 12.5 minutes per game for South Carolina.

== National team career ==
Tournebize made her international debut for France at the 2024 FIBA Under-17 Women's Basketball World Cup where she averaged 3.3 points and 1.8 rebounds per game. She then represented France at the 2025 FIBA U18 Women's EuroBasket where she averaged 12.1 points, 8.9 rebounds and 1.4 assists. During the third place game against Belgium she recorded 19 points and 12 rebounds for a double-double to help France win a bronze medal. She also had a two-handed dunk during the game. She was subsequently named to the All-Star Five.
