= Serbia women's national under-18 and under-19 basketball team =

Serbia
- FIBA zone: FIBA Europe
- National federation: Basketball Federation of Serbia

U19 World Cup
- Appearances: 4
- Medals: Silver: 1 (2005); Bronze: 1 (2007)

U18 EuroBasket
- Appearances: 16
- Medals: Gold: 1 (2007); Silver: 1 (2017); Bronze: 3 (2012, 2013, 2024)

U18 EuroBasket Division B
- Appearances: 1
- Medals: Bronze: 1 (2022)

Serbia women's national under-18 and under-19 basketball team
Medal record

Women's basketball

Representing Serbia

U19 World Cup
Bronze medal – third place	2007 Bratislava	

U18 EuroBasket
Gold medal – first place	2007 Novi Sad	
Silver medal – second place	2017 Sopron	
Bronze medal – third place	2012 Bucharest	
Bronze medal – third place	2013 Vukovar	
Bronze medal – third place	2024 Matosinhos	

The Serbia women's national under-18 and under-19 basketball team (Serbian: Женска кошаркашка репрезентација Србије до 18 и до 19 година / Ženska košarkaška reprezentacija Srbije do 18 i do 19 godina) is a national basketball team of Serbia, administered by the Basketball Federation of Serbia, the governing body for basketball in Serbia. It represents the country in under-18 and under-19 women's international basketball competitions.

The team was established in 2007 after the dissolution of the national team of Serbia and Montenegro.

== FIBA U18 Women's EuroBasket participations ==
=== Representing FR Yugoslavia / Serbia and Montenegro ===
Year	Pos.	Ref.
1965–1990	Part of SFR Yugoslavia	
As (Federal Republic of Yugoslavia) FR Yugoslavia
(Slovakia) 1996	9th	
(Turkey) 1998	5th	
(Poland) 2000	9th	
As Serbia and Montenegro
(Slovakia) 2004	4th	
(Hungary) 2005	Gold medal	
(Spain) 2006	Silver medal	

=== Representing Serbia ===
Year	Division A
2007	1st place, gold medalist(s)
2008	6th
2009	5th
2010	12th
2011	8th
2012	3rd place, bronze medalist(s)
2013	3rd place, bronze medalist(s)
2014	4th
2015	11th

Year	Division A	Division B
2016	11th	
2017	2nd place, silver medalist(s)	
2018	12th	
2019	16th	
2022		3rd place, bronze medalist(s)
2023	4th	
2024	3rd place, bronze medalist(s)	
2025	7th	
2026	4th	

== FIBA Under-19 Women's Basketball World Cup record ==
=== Representing FR Yugoslavia / Serbia and Montenegro ===
Year	Pos.	Pld	W	L	Ref.
1985–1989	Part of SFR Yugoslavia				
1997	did not qualify				
2001	did not qualify				
(Tunisia) 2005	2nd place, silver medalist(s)	8	4	4	

=== Representing Serbia ===
Year	Pos.	Pld	W	L	Ref.
(Slovakia) 2007	3rd place, bronze medalist(s)	9	8	1	
(Thailand) 2009	did not qualify				
(Chile) 2011	did not qualify				
(Lithuania) 2013	11th	8	2	6	
(Russia) 2015	11th	7	4	3	
(Italy) 2017	did not qualify				
(Thailand) 2019	did not qualify				
(Hungary) 2021	did not qualify				
(Spain) 2023	did not qualify				
(Czech Republic) 2025	qualified, but did not participate				
(China) 2027	qualified				
Total	4/11	24	14	10	—

== Previous squads ==
=== European Championship Under-18 ===
- 2005 European Championship — 1st place (Representing Serbia and Montenegro)
  Maja Milutinović, Tamara Radočaj, Iva Prčić, Maja Miljković, Adrijana Knežević, Dunja Prčić, Sonja Petrović, Biljana Stjepanović, Jelena Cerina, Vanja Ilić, Zorica Mitov, Miljana Bojović. Head Coach: Željko Vukićević
- 2006 European Championship — 2nd place (Representing Serbia and Montenegro)
  Ana Dabović, Sonja Petrović, Snežana Aleksić, Iva Roglić, Nina Bogićević, Jelena Milovanović, Maja Miljković, Dragana Gobeljić, Jelena Cerina, Smiljana Ivanović, Ivana Musović, Anđa Ivković. Head Coach: Željko Vukićević
- 2007 European Championship — 1st place
  Jovana Popović, Sonja Petrović, Nevena Jovanović, Tatjana Živanović, Nina Bogićević, Jelena Milovanović, Jelena Jovanović, Jelena Mitić, Milica Paligorić, Sara Krnjić, Ivana Musović, Mina Jovanović. Head Coach: Zoran Kovačić
- 2012 European Championship — 3rd place
  Ivana Bošković, Una Nikolić, Jovana Vidaković, Nataša Kovačević, Olga Stepanović, Kristina Topuzović, Aleksandra Stanaćev, Katarina Vučković, Žaklina Jaković, Sanja Mandić, Dragana Stanković, Aleksandra Crvendakić. Head Coach: Zoran Kovačić
- 2013 European Championship — 3rd place
  Ines Ćorda, Bojana Stevanović, Bogdana Rodić, Danica Piper, Branka Luković, Anja Spasojević, Sanja Mandić, Aleksandra Crvendakić, Radmila Maletić, Julijana Vojinović, Dragana Stanković, Jelena Ćirić. Head Coach: Zoran Kovačić
- 2017 European Championship — 2nd place
  Nevena Dimitrijević, Ivana Curaković, Ivana Katanić, Marijana Zukanović, Teodora Turudić, Lena Radulović, Marta Vulović, Nevena Naumčev, Mina Đorđević, Jelena Novković, Ana Perić, Ivana Raca. Head Coach: Miloš Pavlović
- 2024 European Championship — 3rd place
  Angelina Davorija, Valentina Zarić, Jana Vesić, Minja Aranđelović, Imana Ćosović, Aleksandra Aleksić, Tara Dačić, Hana Predojević, Jovana Popović, Teodora Simončević, Lana Brenjo, Milica Dragičević. Head Coach: Milan Vidosavljević

=== World Championship Under-19 ===
- 2005 World Championship — 2nd place (Representing Serbia and Montenegro)
  Tamara Radočaj, Dajana Butulija, Jelena Cerina, Iva Prčić, Maja Miljković, Zorica Mitov, Adrijana Knežević, Jelena Dubljević, Dunja Prčić, Vanja Ilić, Biljana Stjepanović, Miljana Bojović. Head Coach: Željko Vukićević
- 2007 World Championship — 3rd place
  Jovana Mesaroš, Sonja Petrović, Irena Matović, Nina Bogićević, Iva Roglić, Jelena Milovanović, Maja Miljković, Dragana Gobeljić, Jelena Cerina, Smiljana Ivanović, Ivana Musović, Anđa Ivković. Head Coach: Zoran Kovačić
