= Eslem Güler =

Turkish basketball player (born 2006)

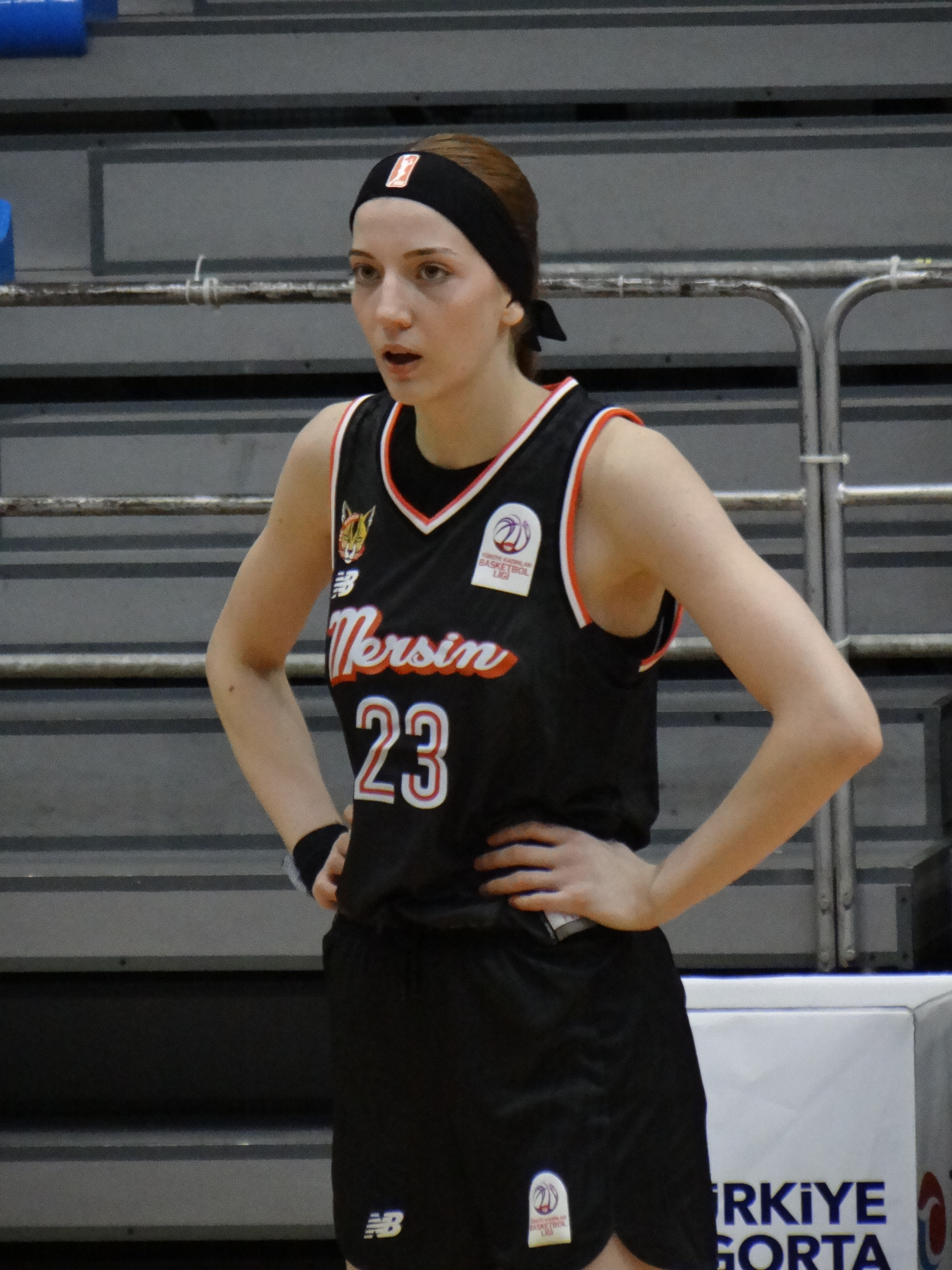
- Eslem Güler of ÇBK Mersin (October 2024)

No. 23 – ÇBK Mersin
- Position: Shooting guard
- League: Turkish Super League; EuroLeague Women

Personal information
- Born: 1 January 2006 (age 20) Turkey
- Listed height: 180 cm (5 ft 11 in)

Career highlights
- [FIBA U16 Women's European Championship Division B runners-up (2022); Turkish Presidential Cup runners-up (2025); EuroCup winners (2025–26)

Eslem Güler (born 1 January 2006) is a Turkish basketball player for ÇBK Mersin. She was part of the Turkey national U-16, U-18 and U-20 teams.

== Cllub career ==
Mersin Basketbol announced on 28 September 2025 that Güler of ÇBK Mersin joins the team for the 2025– 26 Türkiye Basketbol Ligi season on a double-license base.

With ÇBK Mersin, she won the 2025–26 EuroCup Women.

== International career ==
As part of the Turkey national U-16 and U17 team, Güler played in six matches at the 2022 FIBA U16 Women's European Championship Division B - Group B in Podgorica Montenegro, finishing runners*up and 2023 FIBA 3x3 Women's U17 Europe Cup in Heraklion, Greece.

With the Turkey mational U-18 team, she took part in seven matches at the 2023 FIBA U18 Women's European Championship - Group B in Konya, Turkey, and in seven games at the 2024 FIBA U18 Women's EuroBasket - Group A in Matosinhos, Portugal.

She competed with Turkey national U-20 team in seven matches at the 2025 FIBA U20 Women's EuroBasket - Group C in Matosinhos, Portugal.
