= Italy women's national under-18 and under-19 basketball team =

Italy
- FIBA zone: FIBA Europe
- National federation: Italian Basketball Federation

U19 World Cup
- Appearances: 4
- Medals: None

U18 EuroBasket
- Appearances: 37
- Medals: (gold) Gold: 3 (1994, 2010, 2019); (bronze) Bronze: 3 (1973, 1983, 1986)

U18 EuroBasket Division B
- Appearances: 1
- Medals: (gold) Gold: 1 (2006)
Home	Away

The Italy women's national under-18 and under-19 basketball team is a national basketball team of Italy, administered by the Italian Basketball Federation. It represents the country in under-18 and under-19 women's international basketball competitions.

== FIBA U18 Women's EuroBasket record ==
Year	Division A
1965	10th
1967	7th
1969	6th
1971	4th
1973	3rd place, bronze medalist(s)
1975	8th
1977	7th
1979	5th
1981	7th
1983	3rd place, bronze medalist(s)
1984	5th
1986	3rd place, bronze medalist(s)
1988	5th

Year	Division A	Division B
1990	6th	
1992	9th	
1994	1st place, gold medalist(s)	
1996	11th	
1998	7th	
2002	9th	
2005	16th	
2006		1st place, gold medalist(s)
2007	8th	
2008	14th	
2009	10th	
2010	1st place, gold medalist(s)	
2011	10th	

Year	Division A
2012	8th
2013	6th
2014	7th
2015	4th
2016	7th
2017	10th
2018	10th
2019	1st place, gold medalist(s)
2022	5th
2023	13th
2024	9th
2025	6th
2026	7th

== FIBA Under-19 Women's Basketball World Cup record ==
Year	Pos.	Pld	W	L
(United States) 1985	Did not qualify			
(Spain) 1989	Did not qualify			
(Korea) 1993	Did not qualify			
(Brazil) 1997	Did not qualify			
(Czech Republic) 2001	Did not qualify			
(Tunisia) 2005	Did not qualify			
(Slovakia) 2007	Did not qualify			
(Thailand) 2009	Did not qualify			
(Chile) 2011	10th	8	3	5
(Lithuania) 2013	Did not qualify			
(Russia) 2015	Did not qualify			
(Italy) 2017	11th	7	3	4
(Thailand) 2019	Did not qualify			
(Hungary) 2021	11th	7	3	4
(Spain) 2023	11th	7	3	4
(Czech Republic) 2025	Did not qualify			
(China) 2027	Did not qualify			
Total	4/17	29	12	17

== See also ==
- Italy women's national basketball team
- Italy women's national under-17 basketball team
- Italy men's national under-19 basketball team
