= 2025 FIBA U18 Women's EuroBasket =

International youth basketball tournament

Tournament details
- Host country: Spain
- City: La Palma
- Dates: 5–13 July 2025
- Teams: 16 (from 1 confederation)
- Venues: 2 (in 1 host city)

Final positions
- Champions: Spain (6th title)
- Runners-up: Finland
- Third place: France
- Fourth place: Belgium

Official website
- www.fiba.basketball

The 2025 FIBA U18 Women's EuroBasket was the 40th edition of the European basketball championship for under-18 women's national teams. The tournament was played in La Palma, Spain, from 5 to 13 July 2025.

== Participating teams ==
- Belgium
- Czech Republic ▲ (Runners-up, 2024 FIBA U18 Women's EuroBasket Division B)
- Finland
- France
- Greece ▲ (Third place, 2024 FIBA U18 Women's EuroBasket Division B)
- Hungary
- Israel
- Italy
- Latvia
- Montenegro ▲ (Winners, 2024 FIBA U18 Women's EuroBasket Division B)
- Poland
- Portugal
- Serbia
- Slovenia
- Spain
- Turkey

== First round ==
The draw of the first round was held on 28 January 2025 in Freising, Germany.

In the first round, the teams were drawn into four groups of four. All teams advanced to the playoffs.

All times are local (Western European Summer Time – UTC+1).

=== Group A ===
Pos	Team	Pld	W	L	PF	PA	PD	Pts
1	France	3	3	0	225	139	+86	6
2	Montenegro	3	2	1	164	174	−10	5
3	Serbia	3	1	2	175	184	−9	4
4	Israel	3	0	3	156	223	−67	3

Source: FIBA

5 July 2025
14:00

Boxscore

Israel	53–78	France
Scoring by quarter: 12–29, 12–14, 10–16, 19–19
Pts: Zilbershlag 16; Rebs: Zemmel 10; Asts: Zilbershlag 4		Pts: Loubens 17; Rebs: Tournebize 12; Asts: Bentoumi 6

Roberto Estrello, Santa Cruz de La Palma
Attendance: 137
Referees: Ivor Matejek (CZE), Irene Frosolini (ITA), Konstantinos Marinakis (GRE)

5 July 2025
17:00

Boxscore

Montenegro	58–50	Serbia
Scoring by quarter: 20–18, 10–18, 10–3, 18–11
Pts: Vujović 16; Rebs: Rondović, Rakočević 7 Asts: Dragišić 5		Pts: Petrović 22; Rebs: Aleksić, Predojević 8 Asts: Petrović, Aleksić 4

Roberto Estrello, Santa Cruz de La Palma
Attendance: 81
Referees: Esperanza Mendoza (ESP), Duhan Köyıcı (TUR), Ioannis Tiganis (GRE)

6 July 2025
11:30

Boxscore

France	76–35	Montenegro
Scoring by quarter: 18–9, 19–8, 22–7, 17–11
Pts: Loubens 15; Rebs: Bentoumi 9 Asts: Leray 4		Pts: Vrcan, Bulajić 9 Rebs: Jovović 6 Asts: Jovović 2

Severo Rodríguez, Los Llanos de Aridane
Attendance: 53
Referees: Petr Hrusa (CZE), Viktor Nagy (HUN), Azra Mušić (SLO)

6 July 2025
14:00

Boxscore

Serbia	78–55	Israel
Scoring by quarter: 19–5, 17–21, 20–14, 22–15
Pts: Predojević 15; Rebs: Predojević, Popović 7 Asts: Popović 6		Pts: Zilbershlag 25; Rebs: Teichman 7 Asts: Teichman, Cohen Mintz 2

Severo Rodríguez, Los Llanos de Aridane
Attendance: 68
Referees: Dariusz Zapolski (POL), Ivor Matejek (CZE), Irene Frosolini (ITA)

7 July 2025
11:30

Boxscore

Israel	48–67	Montenegro
Scoring by quarter: 11–12, 10–15, 12–19, 15–21
Pts: Zilbershlag 14; Rebs: Zilberschlag 8 Asts: Zilberschlag 5		Pts: Bulajić 17; Rebs: Rakočević 11; Asts: Dragišić 4

Roberto Estrello, Santa Cruz de La Palma
Attendance: 41
Referees: Ivor Matejek (CZE), Viktor Nagy (HUN), Rafiks Misirovs (LAT)

7 July 2025
19:30

Boxscore

Serbia	47–71	France
Scoring by quarter: 15-22, 18-13, 7-17, 8-19
Pts: Petrovic 12; Rebs: Popović 5 Asts: Popović 3		Pts: Broliron 13; Rebs: Bentoumi 7 Asts: Rousseliere 6

Roberto Estrello, Santa Cruz de La Palma
Attendance: 151
Referees: Dariusz Zapolski (POL), Petr Hrusa (CZE), Ioannis Tiganis (GRE)

=== Group B ===
Pos	Team	Pld	W	L	PF	PA	PD	Pts
1	Belgium	3	3	0	215	164	+51	6
2	Latvia	3	2	1	194	169	+25	5
3	Hungary	3	1	2	155	192	−37	4
4	Portugal	3	0	3	138	177	−39	3

Source: FIBA

5 July 2025
11:30

Boxscore

Belgium	67–54	Hungary
Scoring by quarter: 12–16, 23–12, 14–10, 18–16
Pts: Kibedi 20; Rebs: Vilcinskas 12; Asts: Lynch 5		Pts: Drahos, Halmágyi 10; Rebs: Halmagyi 9 Asts: Ocsenás, Gréts 3

Roberto Estrello, Santa Cruz de La Palma
Attendance: 107
Referees: Dariusz Zapolski (POL), Karolina Andersson (FIN), Hrvoje Cavar (BIH)

5 July 2025
19:30

Boxscore

Portugal	47–50	Latvia
Scoring by quarter: 17–12, 12–11, 10–8, 8–19
Pts: Monteiro 11; Rebs: Sousa 7 Asts: Alves 4		Pts: Liepiņa 22; Rebs: Liepiņa 10; Asts: Luzgina 6

Roberto Estrello, Santa Cruz de La Palma
Attendance: 103
Referees: Özlem Yalman (TUR), Petr Hrusa (CZE), Azra Mušić (SLO)

6 July 2025
17:00

Boxscore

Latvia	61–69	Belgium
Scoring by quarter: 13–12, 12–22, 16–17, 20–18
Pts: Liepiņa 19; Rebs: Liepiņa 12; Asts: Aploka 3		Pts: Lynch 19; Rebs: Kibedi, Vilcinskas 10; Asts: Kibedi 4

Severo Rodríguez, Los Llanos de Aridane
Attendance: 69
Referees: Karolina Andersson (FIN), Esperanza Mendoza (ESP), Mladen Lučić (MNE)

6 July 2025
19:30

Boxscore

Hungary	48–42	Portugal
Scoring by quarter: 17–6, 15–12, 6–12, 10–12
Pts: Sinka-Pálinkás 10; Rebs: Janzsó 10; Asts: Ocsenás, Völgyi 5		Pts: Amaro 17; Rebs: three players 8 Asts: L. Silva 3

Severo Rodríguez, Los Llanos de Aridane
Attendance: 96
Referees: Nikola Perlić (CRO), Ivana Ivanović (SRB), Ioannis Tiganis (GRE)

7 July 2025
14:00

Boxscore

Latvia	83–53	Hungary
Scoring by quarter: 20–15, 20–16, 20–7, 23–15
Pts: Liepiņa 20; Rebs: Liepiņa 12; Asts: three players 5		Pts: Hőgye 13; Rebs: Ocsenás, Gréts 5 Asts: Ocsenás 4

Roberto Estrello, Santa Cruz de La Palma
Attendance: 49
Referees: Esperanza Mendoza (ESP), Zdravko Rutešić (MNE), Megaklis-Konstantinos Marinakis (GRE)

7 July 2025
17:00

Boxscore

Belgium	79–49	Portugal
Scoring by quarter: 22–17, 22–10, 17–7, 18–15
Pts: Kibedi 16; Rebs: Kibedi 12; Asts: Kibedi 4		Pts: L. Silva 11; Rebs: Queta 7 Asts: Monteiro 3

Roberto Estrello, Santa Cruz de La Palma
Attendance: 87
Referees: Karolina Andersson (FIN), Duhan Köyıcı (TUR), Irene Frosolini (ITA)

=== Group C ===
Pos	Team	Pld	W	L	PF	PA	PD	Pts
1	Finland	3	2	1	205	152	+53	5
2	Italy	3	2	1	195	155	+40	5
3	Slovenia	3	2	1	179	207	−28	5
4	Greece	3	0	3	161	226	−65	3

Source: FIBA

5 July 2025
14:00

Boxscore

Slovenia	44–82	Finland
Scoring by quarter: 11–17, 13–28, 13–18, 7–19
Pts: Turnšek 24; Rebs: Šćekić, Turnšek 4 Asts: six players 1		Pts: Ogun 21; Rebs: Nikkilä 7 Asts: Talonen 4

Severo Rodríguez, Los Llanos de Aridane
Referees: Gintaras Vitkauskas (LTU), Mladen Lučić (MNE), Vladimir Zanev (BUL)

5 July 2025
17:00

Boxscore

Greece	42–81	Italy
Scoring by quarter: 8–35, 8–19, 11–11, 15–16
Pts: Zorbala 11; Rebs: Lagonikaki 5 Asts: three players 2		Pts: Baldassare 19; Rebs: Obaseki 9 Asts: three players 3

Severo Rodríguez, Los Llanos de Aridane
Attendance: 102
Referees: Suzana Vujičić (MNE), Rafiks Misirovs (LAT), Andžej Urbanovič (LTU)

6 July 2025
11:30

Boxscore

Finland	64–47	Greece
Scoring by quarter: 19–9, 14–13, 12–16, 19–9
Pts: Gardziella 20; Rebs: Ogun 8 Asts: two players 5		Pts: Syrpa 10; Rebs: Andreou 11; Asts: two players 3

Roberto Estrello, Santa Cruz de La Palma
Attendance: 62
Referees: Zdravko Rutešić (MNE), Özlem Yalman (TUR), Andžej Urbanovič (LTU)

6 July 2025
14:00

Boxscore

Italy	53–54	Slovenia
Scoring by quarter: 11–15, 13–14, 25–12, 4–13
Pts: Hassan 16; Rebs: Obaseki 10; Asts: Giacchatti 6		Pts: Turnsek 18; Rebs: three players 8 Asts: two players 4

Roberto Estrello, Santa Cruz de La Palma
Attendance: 85
Referees: Duhan Köyıcı (TUR), Valentin Oliot (FRA), Anna Belousova (LAT)

7 July 2025
11:30

Boxscore

Slovenia	81–72	Greece
Scoring by quarter: 18–12, 18–22, 26–25, 19–13
Pts: Turnšek 19; Rebs: Turnšek 10; Asts: Jerković 8		Pts: Cholopoulou 24; Rebs: Cholopoulou 6 Asts: Andreou, Karra 3

Severo Rodríguez, Los Llanos de Aridane
Attendance: 30
Referees: Valentin Oliot (FRA), Ivana Ivanović (SRB), Mladen Lučić (MNE)

7 July 2025
17:00

Boxscore

Italy	61–59	Finland
Scoring by quarter: 18–22, 16–9, 19–15, 8–13
Pts: Baldassarre 13; Rebs: Cere 6 Asts: Giacchetti 5		Pts: Mace, Ogun 11; Rebs: Ogun 11; Asts: Mace 5

Severo Rodríguez, Los Llanos de Aridane
Attendance: 103
Referees: Özlem Yalman (TUR), Hrvoje Ćavar (BIH), Vladimir Zanev (BUL)

=== Group D ===
Pos	Team	Pld	W	L	PF	PA	PD	Pts
1	Spain	3	3	0	246	138	+108	6
2	Poland	3	2	1	189	174	+15	5
3	Czech Republic	3	1	2	171	217	−46	4
4	Turkey	3	0	3	148	225	−77	3

Source: FIBA

5 July 2025
11:30

Boxscore

Czech Republic	50–64	Poland
Scoring by quarter: 12–26, 14–14, 12–9, 12–15
Pts: Dittrichová 9 Rebs: Metyšová, Kaducová 10; Asts: Kubínová 3		Pts: Kloska 13; Rebs: Burliga 12; Asts: Burliga 5

Severo Rodríguez, Los Llanos de Aridane
Attendance: 39
Referees: Ivana Ivanovic (SRB), Zdravko Rutesic (MNE), Anna Belousova (LAT)

5 July 2025
19:30

Boxscore

Turkey	42–75	Spain
Scoring by quarter: 12–24, 17–12, 8–19, 5–20
Pts: Vural 9 Rebs: Berber, Vural 4 Asts: five players 1		Pts: Díaz 12; Rebs: Salzmann 7 Asts: Cargol, García 5

Severo Rodríguez, Los Llanos de Aridane
Attendance: 402
Referees: Valentin Oliot (FRA), Nikola Perlić (CRO), Viktor Nagy (HUN)

6 July 2025
17:00

Boxscore

Poland	73–42	Turkey
Scoring by quarter: 18–13, 16–5, 22–6, 17–18
Pts: Danielewicz 12; Rebs: Marczynska 11; Asts: two players 4		Pts: Duzcu 9 Rebs: Yilik 7 Asts: Sel 3

Roberto Estrello, Santa Cruz de La Palma
Attendance: 126
Referees: Gintaras Vitkauskas (LTU), Rafiks Misirovs (LAT), Megaklis-Konstantinos Marinakis (GRE)

6 July 2025
19:30

Boxscore

Spain	89–44	Czech Republic
Scoring by quarter: 33–11, 13–13, 19–5, 24–15
Pts: Díaz 14; Rebs: four players 6 Asts: three players 4		Pts: Kaducová 10; Rebs: Taušová, Metyšová 4 Asts: Metyšová 3

Roberto Estrello, Santa Cruz de La Palma
Attendance: 876
Referees: Suzana Vujičić (MNE), Hrvoje Ćavar (BIH), Vladimir Zanev (BUL)

7 July 2025
14:00

Boxscore

Turkey	64–77	Czech Republic
Scoring by quarter: 9–26, 10–18, 23–16, 22–17
Pts: Berber 20; Rebs: four players 5 Asts: Vural 3		Pts: Tegelová 15; Rebs: Cahová 9 Asts: Kubínová 7

Severo Rodríguez, Los Llanos de Aridane
Attendance: 53
Referees: Nikola Perlić (CRO), Gintaras Vitkauskas (LTU), Azra Mušić (SLO)

7 July 2025
19:30

Boxscore

Poland	52–82	Spain
Scoring by quarter: 19-20, 8-27, 12-18, 13-17
Pts: Marczynska 12; Rebs: Haegenbarth 7 Asts: Burliga 3		Pts: Okeke 14; Rebs: Domínguez 10; Asts: Cintas 7

Severo Rodríguez, Los Llanos de Aridane
Attendance: 690
Referees: Suzana Vujicic (MNE), Andžej Urbanovič (LTU), Anna Belousova (LAT)

== Playoff brackets ==
=== Main bracket ===
Round of 16
9 July
A1 France	86
B4 Portugal	39
9 July
C2 Italy	64
D3 Czech Republic	47
9 July
B2 Latvia	57
A3 Serbia	66
9 July
D1 Spain	61
C4 Greece	38
9 July
A2 Montenegro	74
B3 Hungary	71
9 July
C1 Finland	78
D4 Turkey	57
9 July
B1 Belgium	66
A4 Israel	44
9 July
D2 Poland	67
C3 Slovenia	65

Quarterfinals
10 July
A1 France	72
C2 Italy	34
10 July
A3 Serbia	65
D1 Spain	89
10 July
A2 Montenegro	52
C1 Finland	64
10 July
B1 Belgium	63
D2 Poland	57

Semifinals
12 July
A1 France	65
D1 Spain	71
12 July
C1 Finland	77
B1 Belgium	69

Final
13 July
D1 Spain	81
C1 Finland	72
3rd place match
13 July
A1 France	72
B1 Belgium	47

=== 5th place bracket ===
5th–8th place semifinals
12 July
C2 Italy	74
A3 Serbia	72
12 July
A2 Montenegro	54
D2 Poland	68

5th place match
13 July
C2 Italy	60
D2 Poland	69
7th place match
13 July
A3 Serbia	75
A2 Montenegro	51

=== 9th place bracket ===
9th–16th place quarterfinals
10 July
B4 Portugal	37
D3 Czech Republic	62
10 July
B2 Latvia	56
C4 Greece	49
10 July
B3 Hungary	61
D4 Turkey	57
10 July
A4 Israel	50
C3 Slovenia	61

9th–12th place semifinals
12 July
D3 Czech Republic	35
B2 Latvia	59
12 July
B3 Hungary	72
C3 Slovenia	70

9th place match
13 July
B2 Latvia	60
B3 Hungary	66
11th place match
13 July
D3 Czech Republic	52
C3 Slovenia	46

=== 13th place bracket ===
13th–16th place semifinals
12 July
B4 Portugal	61
C4 Greece	65
12 July
D4 Turkey	66
A4 Israel	57

13th place match
13 July
C4 Greece	48
D4 Turkey	71
15th place match
13 July
B4 Portugal	58
A4 Israel	52

== Playoff results ==
=== Round of 16 ===
9 July 2025
12:30

Boxscore

Montenegro	74–71	Hungary
Scoring by quarter: 22–17, 17–15, 16–22, 19–17
Pts: Bulajic 17; Rebs: Vujovic 11; Asts: Dragisic 5		Pts: Sinka-Palinkas 18; Rebs: Drahos 6 Asts: Drahos 8

Severo Rodríguez, Los Llanos de Aridane
Attendance: 18
Referees: Valentin Oliot (FRA), Petr Hrusa (CZE), Anna Beousova (LAT)

9 July 2025
12:30

Boxscore

Belgium	66–44	Israel
Scoring by quarter: 25–7, 16–10, 13–11, 12–16
Pts: Vanderstraeten 12; Rebs: Lynch, Vilcinskas 12; Asts: Bah 7		Pts: Zilbershlag 10; Rebs: Zilbershlag 6 Asts: Natanov 3

Roberto Estrello, Santa Cruz de La Palma
Attendance: 55
Referees: Ivana Ivanovic (SRB), Megaklis Marinakis (GRE), Vladimir Zanev (BUL)

9 July 2025
15:00

Boxscore

Finland	76–57	Turkey
Scoring by quarter: 23–11, 19–16, 11–17, 23–13
Pts: Mace 13; Rebs: Nikkila, Ogun 6 Asts: Mace 6		Pts: Harma 15; Rebs: Berber 9 Asts: Berber 4

Severo Rodríguez, Los Llanos de Aridane
Attendance: 25
Referees: Ivor Matejek (CZE), Gintaras Vitkauskas (LTU), Irene Frosolini (ITA)

9 July 2025
15:00

Boxscore

Poland	67–65	Slovenia
Scoring by quarter: 15–13, 14–18, 15–15, 23–19
Pts: Burliga 23; Rebs: Burliga 12; Asts: Burliga, Brzustowska 4		Pts: Turnsek 17; Rebs: Turnsek 10; Asts: Turnsek 5

Roberto Estrello, Santa Cruz de La Palma
Attendance: 81
Referees: Esperanza Mendoza (ESP), Rafiks Misirovs (LAT), Ioannis Tiganis (GRE)

9 July 2025
18:00

Boxscore

France	86–39	Portugal
Scoring by quarter: 24–14, 20–8, 18–7, 24–10
Pts: Tournebize 14; Rebs: Tournebize 12; Asts: Simplot 5		Pts: Alves 10; Rebs: Teixeira 6 Asts: Silva 3

Severo Rodríguez, Los Llanos de Aridane
Attendance: 80
Referees: Suzana Vujicic (MNE), Hrvoje Cavar (BIH), Azra Mušic (SLO)

9 July 2025
18:00

Boxscore

Latvia	57–66	Serbia
Scoring by quarter: 17–15, 11–17, 15–12, 14–22
Pts: Liepina 14; Rebs: Plorina 10; Asts: Aploka 5		Pts: Aleksic 12; Rebs: Mutavdzic 6 Asts: Aleksic, Dragicevic 3

Roberto Estrello, Santa Cruz de La Palma
Attendance: 81
Referees: Ozlem Yalman (TUR), Viktor Nagy (HUN), Andžej Urbanovič (LTU)

9 July 2025
20:30

Boxscore

Italy	64–47	Czech Republic
Scoring by quarter: 22–10, 16–15, 9–12, 17–10
Pts: Hassan 13; Rebs: Hassan 9 Asts: Giacchetti 5		Pts: Tegelova 12; Rebs: Metyšová 8 Asts: Metyšová 4

Severo Rodríguez, Los Llanos de Aridane
Attendance: 200
Referees: Dariusz Napolski (POL), Duhan Köyici (TUR), Zdravko Rutesic (MNE)

9 July 2025
20:30

Boxscore

Spain	61–38	Greece
Scoring by quarter: 16–5, 22–10, 9–17, 14–6
Pts: Domínguez 13; Rebs: Domínguez 14; Asts: four players 3		Pts: Andreou, Karra 8 Rebs: Syrpa 10; Asts: Patsiatzi 4

Roberto Estrello, Santa Cruz de La Palma
Attendance: 700
Referees: Nikola Perlic (CRO), Karolina Andersson (FIN), Mladen Lucic (MNE)

=== 9th–16th place quarterfinals ===
10 July 2025
12:30

Boxscore

Hungary	61–57	Turkey
Scoring by quarter: 13–8, 14–18, 15–15, 19–16
Pts: Drahos 16; Rebs: Drahos, Ocsenas 8 Asts: Drahos 4		Pts: Cinar 13; Rebs: Vural, Harma 7 Asts: Gurel 4

Severo Rodríguez, Los Llanos de Aridane
Attendance: 14
Referees: Ivana Ivanovic (SRB), Rafiks Misirovs (LAT), Ioannis Tiganis (GRE)

10 July 2025
15:00

Boxscore

Israel	50–61	Slovenia
Scoring by quarter: 12–15, 14–12, 12–17, 12–17
Pts: Zilbershlag 27; Rebs: Zilbershlag 14; Asts: Yadin 3		Pts: Sedminek, Jerkovic 13; Rebs: Sivka 15; Asts: Jerkovic 5

Severo Rodríguez, Los Llanos de Aridane
Attendance: 35
Referees: Ivor Matejek (CZE), Megaklis Marinakis (GRE), Vladimir Zanev (BUL)

10 July 2025
18:00

Boxscore

Portugal	37–62	Czech Republic
Scoring by quarter: 10–15, 7–9, 10–25, 10–13
Pts: Alves 15; Rebs: Teixeira 9 Asts: Alves, Fare 2		Pts: Kubinova 15; Rebs: Kubinova, Cahova 7 Asts: Metysova 5

Severo Rodríguez, Los Llanos de Aridane
Attendance: 39
Referees: Ozlem Yalman (TUR), Mladen Lucic (MNE), Irene Frosolini (ITA)

10 July 2025
20:30

Boxscore

Latvia	56–49	Greece
Scoring by quarter: 12–14, 9–13, 18–11, 17–11
Pts: Liepina 21; Rebs: Liepina 12; Asts: Luzgina 4		Pts: Cholopoulou 18; Rebs: Cholopoulou 10; Asts: Cholopoulou, Lianoudi 3

Severo Rodríguez, Los Llanos de Aridane
Attendance: 51
Referees: Duhan Köyici (TUR), Zdravko Rutesic (MNE), Viktor Nagy (HUN)

=== 13th–16th place semifinals ===
12 July 2025
12:30

Boxscore

Turkey	66–57	Israel
Scoring by quarter: 8–12, 20–19, 18–11, 20–15
Pts: Barnes 20; Rebs: Duzcu 10; Asts: Vural 5		Pts: Zilbershlag 25; Rebs: Zilbershlag 14; Asts: Elmaliah, Zilbershlag 4

Severo Rodríguez, Los Llanos de Aridane
Attendance: 23
Referees: Dariusz Zapolski (POL), Ivana Ivanović (SRB), Viktor Nagy (HUN)

12 July 2025
15:00

Boxscore

Portugal	61–65	Greece
Scoring by quarter: 15–17, 18–11, 14–14, 14–23
Pts: Teixeira 14; Rebs: Queta, Teixeira 6 Asts: Alves 10		Pts: Syrpa 16; Rebs: Andreou 12; Asts: Cholopoulou 4

Severo Rodríguez, Los Llanos de Aridane
Attendance: 26
Referees: Valentin Oliot (FRA), Andžej Urbanovič (LTU), Azra Mušic (SLO)

=== 15th place match ===
13 July 2025
10:00

Boxscore

Portugal	58–52	Israel
Scoring by quarter: 17–15, 19–10, 7–13, 15–14
Pts: Amaro 18; Rebs: Teixeira 10; Asts: Alves 9		Pts: Zilbershlag 12; Rebs: Zilbershlag 12; Asts: Yanay, Zilbershlag 4

Severo Rodríguez, Los Llanos de Aridane
Attendance: 15
Referees: Andžej Urbanovič (LTU), Rafiks Misirovs (LAT), Ioannis Tiganis (GRE)

=== 13th place match ===
13 July 2025
14:00

Boxscore

Greece	48–71	Turkey
Scoring by quarter: 17–18, 11–14, 9–15, 11–24
Pts: Syrpa 10; Rebs: Syrpa 6 Asts: Andreou 4		Pts: Yilik 17; Rebs: Yilik 13; Asts: Gurel 5

Roberto Estrello, Santa Cruz de La Palma
Attendance: 10
Referees: Ivor Matejek (CZE), Nikola Perlic (CRO), Gintaras Vitkauskas (LTU)

=== 9th–12th place semifinals ===
12 July 2025
18:00

Boxscore

Hungary	72–70	Slovenia
Scoring by quarter: 17–25, 20–14, 14–14, 21–17
Pts: Szauter 12; Rebs: Kendelényi, Ocsenás 5 Asts: Völgyi 5		Pts: Turnšek 26; Rebs: Šćekić 8 Asts: Jerković 9

Severo Rodríguez, Los Llanos de Aridane
Attendance: 29
Referees: Zdravko Rutesic (MNE), Irene Frosolini (ITA), Ioannis Tiganis (GRE)

12 July 2025
20:30

Boxscore

Czech Republic	35–59	Latvia
Scoring by quarter: 12−17, 6−16, 10−11, 7−15
Pts: Paurová 10; Rebs: Kaducová 5 Asts: Paurová, Vasileva 3		Pts: Plorina 11; Rebs: Plorina 11; Asts: Plorina 5

Severo Rodríguez, Los Llanos de Aridane
Attendance: 32
Referees: Karolina Andersson (FIN), Mladen Lučić (MNE), Vladimir Zanev (BUL)

=== 11th place match ===
13 July 2025
15:00

Boxscore

Czech Republic	52–46	Slovenia
Scoring by quarter: 11–19, 17–10, 15–3, 9–14
Pts: Civinová 10; Rebs: Vasileva 8 Asts: Taušová 3		Pts: Turnšek 17; Rebs: Šćekić 8 Asts: Jerković, Trantura 4

Severo Rodríguez, Los Llanos de Aridane
Attendance: 32
Referees: Ivana Ivanović (SRB), Viktor Nagy (HUN), Irene Frosolini (ITA)

=== 9th place match ===
13 July 2025
17:30

Boxscore

Latvia	60–66	Hungary
Scoring by quarter: 10–15, 12–20, 18–13, 20–18
Pts: Luzgina, Plorina 14; Rebs: Plorina 15; Asts: Luzgina 5		Pts: Drahos 26; Rebs: Gréts, Kendelényi 7 Asts: Gréts, Ocsenás 4

Severo Rodríguez, Los Llanos de Aridane
Attendance: 21
Referees: Petr Hrusa (CZE), Mladen Lučić (MNE), Megaklis-Konstantinos Marinakis (GRE)

=== Championship quarterfinals ===
10 July 2025
12:30

Boxscore

Montenegro	52–64	Finland
Scoring by quarter: 18–16, 11–17, 15–16, 8–15
Pts: Bulajic 17; Rebs: Rakocevic 11; Asts: Dragisic 5		Pts: Talonen 14; Rebs: Nenonen 7 Asts: Mace, Ogun 3

Roberto Estrello, Santa Cruz de La Palma
Attendance: 100
Referees: Esperanza Mendoza (ESP), Gintaras Vitkauskas (LTU), Anna Belousova (LAT)

10 July 2025
15:00

Boxscore

Belgium	63–57	Poland
Scoring by quarter: 20–12, 15–13, 9–19, 19–13
Pts: Lynch 22; Rebs: Kibedi, Vilcinskas 9 Asts: Pauwels, Lynch 4		Pts: Haegenbarth 15; Rebs: Burliga 13; Asts: Kloska 5

Roberto Estrello, Santa Cruz de La Palma
Attendance: 40
Referees: Valentin Oliot (FRA), Nikola Perlic (CRO), Azra Mušić (SLO)

10 July 2025
18:00

Boxscore

France	72–34	Italy
Scoring by quarter: 27–8, 15–11, 12–11, 18–4
Pts: three players 15; Rebs: Tournebize 7 Asts: Broliron, Rousseliere 4		Pts: Giacchetti 7 Rebs: Zanetti 6 Asts: Giacchetti 2

Roberto Estrello, Santa Cruz de La Palma
Attendance: 179
Referees: Suzana Vujicic (MNE), Hrvoje Cavar (BIH), Andžej Urbanovič (LTU)

10 July 2025
20:30

Boxscore

Serbia	65–89	Spain
Scoring by quarter: 10–23, 18–23, 22–24, 15–19
Pts: Popovic 20; Rebs: Mutavdzic, Dragicevic 20; Asts: Petrovic 4		Pts: Okeke 18; Rebs: Okeke 10; Asts: Cintas 6

Roberto Estrello, Santa Cruz de La Palma
Attendance: 481
Referees: Dariusz Zapolski (POL), Petr Hrusa (CZE), Karolina Andersson (FIN)

=== 5th–8th place semifinals ===
12 July 2025
12:30

Boxscore

Montenegro	54–68	Poland
Scoring by quarter: 6–26, 14–17, 17–17, 17–8
Pts: Vujović 16; Rebs: Bulajić 4 Asts: Kasalica 4		Pts: Burliga 12; Rebs: Marczynska 10; Asts: Danielewicz 6

Roberto Estrello, Santa Cruz de La Palma
Attendance: 13
Referees: Petr Hrusa (CZE), Megaklis-Konstantinos Marinakis (GRE), Rafiks Misirovs (LAT)

12 July 2025
15:00

Boxscore

Italy	74–72	Serbia
Scoring by quarter: 20–24, 17–13, 16–13, 21–22
Pts: Baldassare, Giacchetti 17; Rebs: Obaseki 11; Asts: Giacchetti 7		Pts: Popović 22; Rebs: Popović, Predojević 8 Asts: Popović 6

Roberto Estrello, Santa Cruz de La Palma
Referees: Esperanza Mendoza (ESP), Gintaras Vitkauskas (LTU), Anna Belousova (LAT)

=== 7th place match ===
13 July 2025
12:30

Boxscore

Serbia	75–51	Montenegro
Scoring by quarter: 14–11, 22–10, 24–17, 15–13
Pts: Popović 20; Rebs: Popović 14; Asts: Popović 12		Pts: Bulajić 26; Rebs: Bulajić, Radulović 5 Asts: Radulović 6

Severo Rodríguez, Los Llanos de Aridane
Attendance: 12
Referees: Karolina Andersson (FIN), Vladimir Zanev (BUL), Anna Belousova (LAT)

=== 5th place match ===
13 July 2025
11:30

Boxscore

Italy	60–69	Poland
Scoring by quarter: 20–17, 17–19, 15–20, 8–13
Pts: Baldassarre 12; Rebs: Obaseki 9 Asts: Giacchetti 5		Pts: Burliga 20; Rebs: Burliga, Haegenbarth 9 Asts: Stepinska 5

Roberto Estrello, Santa Cruz de La Palma
Attendance: 28
Referees: Zdravko Rutesic (MNE), Ozlem Yalman (TUR), Azra Mušic (SLO)

=== Championship semifinals ===
12 July 2025
18:00

Boxscore

Finland	77–69	Belgium
Scoring by quarter: 10–17, 21–17, 24–13, 22–22
Pts: Luukkanen 17; Rebs: Ogun, Talonen 8 Asts: Mace 7		Pts: Kibedi, Lynch 14; Rebs: Vilcinskas 12; Asts: Kibedi 6

Roberto Estrello, Santa Cruz de La Palma
Attendance: 313
Referees: Suzana Vujičić (MNE), Duhan Köyıcı (TUR), Hrvoje Ćavar (BIH)

12 July 2025
20:30

Boxscore

France	65–71	Spain
Scoring by quarter: 16–19, 15−22, 16–13, 18–17
Pts: Broliron 15; Rebs: Bentoumi 12; Asts: Broliron 5		Pts: García 15; Rebs: Okeke 8 Asts: García 9

Roberto Estrello, Santa Cruz de La Palma
Attendance: 1,238
Referees: Özlem Yalman (TUR), Ivor Matejek (CZE), Nikola Perlić (CRO)

=== 3rd place match ===
13 July 2025
17:00

Boxscore

France	72–47	Belgium
Scoring by quarter: 18–17, 24–8, 16–6, 14–16
Pts: Tournebize 19; Rebs: Tournebize 12; Asts: Broliron, Otto 5		Pts: Vilcinskas 11; Rebs: Vilcinskas 8 Asts: Dupont 5

Roberto Estrello, Santa Cruz de La Palma
Attendance: 318
Referees: Esperanza Mendoza (ESP), Duhan Köyıcı (TUR), Hrvoje Ćavar (BIH)

=== Final ===
13 July 2025
19:30

Boxscore

Spain	81–72	Finland
Scoring by quarter: 24–12, 19–19, 13–21, 25–20
Pts: Okeke 23; Rebs: Okeke 7 Asts: García 12		Pts: Luukkanen 15; Rebs: Mace 6 Asts: Gardziella, Mace 3

Roberto Estrello, Santa Cruz de La Palma
Attendance: 2,320
Referees: Dariusz Napolski (POL), Suzana Vujičić (MNE), Valentin Oliot (FRA)

== Final standings ==
Rank	Team	Record
1st place, gold medalist(s)	Spain	7–0
2nd place, silver medalist(s)	Finland	5–2
3rd place, bronze medalist(s)	France	6–1
4	Belgium	5–2
5	Poland	5–2
6	Italy	4–3
7	Serbia	3–4
8	Montenegro	3–4
9	Hungary	4–3
10	Latvia	4–3
11	Czech Republic	3–4
12	Slovenia	3–4
13	Turkey	2–5
14	Greece	1–6
15	Portugal	1–6
16	Israel	0–7

Relegated to the 2026 FIBA U18 Women's EuroBasket Division B

== See also ==
- 2025 FIBA U18 Women's EuroBasket Division B
