= 2014 FIBA Europe Under-18 Championship for Women =

2014 FIBA U18 Women's European Championship
31st FIBA Under-18 Women's European Basketball Championship

Tournament details
- Host country: Portugal
- Dates: 17–27 July 2014
- Teams: 16
- Venues: 2 (in 1 host city)

Final positions
- Champions: Russia (5th title)

Official website
- www.fibaeurope.com

The 2014 FIBA Europe Under-18 Championship for Women was the 31st edition of the European Under-18 Women's Basketball Championship. 16 teams featured in the competition, held in Matosinhos, Portugal, from 17 to 27 July 2014.

== Participating teams ==
- Belgium ▲ (Runners-up, 2013 FIBA Europe Women's Under-18 Championship Division B)
- Croatia
- Czech Republic
- France
- Greece
- Italy
- Lithuania ▲ (3rd place, 2013 FIBA Europe Women's Under-18 Championship Division B)
- Netherlands
- Poland ▲ (Winners, 2013 FIBA Europe Women's Under-18 Championship Division B)
- Portugal
- Russia
- Serbia
- Slovenia
- Spain
- Sweden
- Turkey

== First round ==
The first-round groups draw took place on 1 December 2013 in Freising, Germany. In the first round, the sixteen teams are allocated in four groups of four teams each. The top three teams of each group will qualify for the Second Round. The last team of each group will play in the Classification Group G first, then in the 9th–16th place playoffs.

Team advances to the Second round
Team will compete in the Classification Group G

=== Group A ===
Team	Pld	W	L	PF	PA	PD	Pts
Russia	3	2	1	197	153	+44	5
France	3	2	1	155	140	+15	5
Slovenia	3	2	1	162	172	−10	5
Turkey	3	0	3	153	202	−49	3

17 July 2014

Russia	50–55	France

17 July 2014

Slovenia	73–54	Turkey

18 July 2014

France	46–47	Slovenia

18 July 2014

Turkey	56–75	Russia

19 July 2014

Slovenia	42–72	Russia

19 July 2014

France	54–43	Turkey

=== Group B ===
Team	Pld	W	L	PF	PA	PD	Pts
Serbia	3	2	1	202	184	+18	5
Belgium	3	2	1	159	157	+2	5
Lithuania	3	1	2	195	204	−9	4
Greece	3	1	2	185	196	−11	4

17 July 2014

Lithuania	68–80	Serbia

17 July 2014

Belgium	61–43	Greece

18 July 2014

Greece	65–70	Lithuania

18 July 2014

Serbia	57–39	Belgium

19 July 2014

Lithuania	57–59	Belgium

19 July 2014

Greece	77–65	Serbia

=== Group C ===
Team	Pld	W	L	PF	PA	PD	Pts
Spain	3	3	0	246	152	+94	6
Netherlands	3	1	2	169	176	−7	4
Croatia	3	1	2	143	211	−68	4
Poland	3	1	2	173	192	−19	4

17 July 2014

Spain	102–35	Croatia

17 July 2014

Poland	50–66	Netherlands

18 July 2014

Croatia	50–52	Poland

18 July 2014

Netherlands	46–68	Spain

19 July 2014

Poland	71–76	Spain

19 July 2014

Croatia	58–57	Netherlands

=== Group D ===
Team	Pld	W	L	PF	PA	PD	Pts
Italy	3	3	0	192	155	+37	6
Czech Republic	3	2	1	195	175	+20	5
Portugal	3	1	2	166	171	−5	4
Sweden	3	0	3	147	199	−52	3

17 July 2014

Italy	70–60	Czech Republic

17 July 2014

Portugal	63–50	Sweden

18 July 2014

Sweden	51–61	Italy

18 July 2014

Czech Republic	60–59	Portugal

19 July 2014

Czech Republic	75–46	Sweden

19 July 2014

Portugal	44–61	Italy

== Second round ==
Twelve advancing teams from the First Round will be allocated in two groups of six teams each. The top four teams of each group will advance to the quarterfinals. The last two teams of each group will play in the 9th–16th place playoffs against the teams from the Group G.

Team advances to the Quarterfinals
Team will compete in the 9th – 16th place playoffs

=== Group E ===
Team	Pld	W	L	PF	PA	PD	Pts
France	5	4	1	277	238	+39	9
Russia	5	4	1	330	246	+84	9
Serbia	5	3	2	332	305	+27	8
Belgium	5	2	3	247	281	−34	7
Slovenia	5	2	3	275	320	−45	7
Lithuania	5	0	5	273	344	−71	5

21 July 2014

Lithuania	43–86	Russia

21 July 2014

Belgium	46–58	France

21 July 2014

Slovenia	62–79	Serbia

22 July 2014

Lithuania	62–69	Slovenia

22 July 2014

France	68–52	Serbia

22 July 2014

Russia	54–42	Belgium

23 July 2014

Serbia	64–68	Russia

23 July 2014

France	50–43	Lithuania

23 July 2014

Belgium	61–55	Slovenia

=== Group F ===
Team	Pld	W	L	PF	PA	PD	Pts
Spain	5	5	0	369	256	+113	10
Italy	5	4	1	323	284	+39	9
Croatia	5	2	3	254	344	−90	7
Netherlands	5	2	3	296	294	+2	7
Czech Republic	5	1	4	295	332	−37	6
Portugal	5	1	4	264	291	−27	6

21 July 2014

Croatia	53–68	Italy

21 July 2014

Czech Republic	57–70	Netherlands

21 July 2014

Portugal	52–62	Spain

22 July 2014

Spain	69–60	Czech Republic

22 July 2014

Portugal	59–44	Croatia

22 July 2014

Netherlands	59–61	Italy

23 July 2014

Italy	63–68	Spain

23 July 2014

Czech Republic	58–64	Croatia

23 July 2014

Netherlands	64–50	Portugal

== Classification Group G ==
The last team of each group of the First Round will compete in this Classification Round.

Team	Pld	W	L	PF	PA	PD	Pts
Poland	3	3	0	193	159	+34	6
Greece	3	2	1	160	140	+20	5
Sweden	3	1	2	158	181	−23	4
Turkey	3	0	3	152	183	−31	3

21 July 2014

Turkey	60–63	Sweden

21 July 2014

Greece	51–61	Poland

22 July 2014

Poland	65–53	Turkey

22 July 2014

Sweden	40–54	Greece

23 July 2014

Turkey	39–55	Greece

23 July 2014

Poland	67–55	Sweden

== 9th – 16th place playoffs ==
25 July 2014

Slovenia	54–44	Turkey

25 July 2014

Czech Republic	60–56	Sweden

25 July 2014

Portugal	57–54	Greece

25 July 2014

Lithuania	52–75	Poland

=== Classification games for 13th – 16th place ===
26 July 2014
14:00

Turkey	61–72	Lithuania

26 July 2014
16:15

Sweden	46–51	Greece

=== Classification games for 9th – 12th place ===
26 July 2014
14:00

Slovenia	70–59	Poland

26 July 2014
16:15

Czech Republic	54–55	Portugal

== 1st – 8th place playoffs ==
Quarter-finals
25 July 2014
France	70
Netherlands	57
25 July 2014
Italy	51
Serbia	66
25 July 2014
Spain	52
Belgium	47
25 July 2014
Russia	67
Croatia	41

Semi-finals
26 July 2014
France	58
Serbia	56
26 July 2014
Spain	59
Russia	65

Final
27 July 2014
France	53
Russia	57
Third place
27 July 2014
Serbia	69
Spain	74

=== Quarterfinals ===
25 July 2014
18:30

Russia	67–41	Croatia

25 July 2014
18:30

France	70–57	Netherlands

25 July 2014
20:45

Spain	52–47	Belgium

25 July 2014
20:45

Italy	51–66	Serbia

==== Classification games for 5th – 8th place ====
26 July 2014
18:30

Netherlands	59–54	Italy

26 July 2014
20:45

Belgium	60–26	Croatia

=== Semifinals ===
26 July 2014
18:30

France	58–56	Serbia

26 July 2014
20:45

Spain	59–65	Russia

== Final classification games ==
=== Match for 15th place ===
27 July 2014
11:45

Turkey	54–52	Sweden

=== Match for 13th place ===
27 July 2014
14:00

Lithuania	52–42	Greece

=== Match for 11th place ===
27 July 2014
16:15

Poland	65–73	Czech Republic

=== Match for 9th place ===
27 July 2014
13:00

Slovenia	51–61	Portugal

=== Match for 7th place ===
27 July 2014
18:30

Italy	53–51	Croatia

=== Match for 5th place ===
27 July 2014
15:15

Netherlands	55–63	Belgium

=== Bronze medal match ===
27 July 2014
17:30

Serbia	69–74	Spain

=== Final ===
27 July 2014
19:45

France	53–57	Russia

Matosinhos
Attendance: 2 500
Referees: Renaud Geller (BEL), Sasa Maricic (SRB), Sonia Teixeira (POR)

== Final standings ==
Rank	Team
1st place, gold medalist(s)	Russia
2nd place, silver medalist(s)	France
3rd place, bronze medalist(s)	Spain
4th	Serbia
5th	Belgium
6th	Netherlands
7th	Italy
8th	Croatia
9th	Portugal
10th	Slovenia
11th	Czech Republic
12th	Poland
13th	Lithuania
14th	Greece
15th	Turkey
16th	Sweden

2014 FIBA Europe Women's Under-18 Championship winners

Russia
5th title

Team qualified for the 2015 FIBA Under-19 World Championship for Women
Team relegated to 2015 Division B
