= Spain women's national under-18 and under-19 basketball team =

Youth national basketball team

Spain
- FIBA zone: FIBA Europe
- National federation: FEB

U19 World Cup
- Appearances: 15
- Medals: (silver) Silver: 3 (2009, 2011, 2023); (bronze) Bronze: 2 (2019, 2025)

U18 EuroBasket
- Appearances: 36
- Medals: (gold) Gold: 7 (1998, 2006, 2009, 2013, 2015, 2025, 2026); (silver) Silver: 10 (1990, 1994, 2004, 2005, 2007, 2010, 2016, 2018, 2022, 2024); (bronze) Bronze: 3 (2011, 2014, 2023)
Home	Away
Medal record
Event	1st	2nd	3rd
FIBA U19 World Cup	0	3	2
FIBA U18 EuroBasket	7	10	3
Total	7	13	5

The Spain women's national under-18 and under-19 basketball team is a national basketball team of Spain and is governed by the Spanish Basketball Federation. It represents the country in under-18 and under-19 women's international basketball competitions.

== Tournament record ==
=== U19 World Cup ===
Year	Pos.	Pld	W	L
(United States) 1985	7th	6	3	3
(Spain) 1989	5th	7	5	2
(Korea) 1993	Did not qualify			
(Brazil) 1997	8th	7	2	5
(Czech Republic) 2001	Did not qualify			
(Tunisia) 2005	5th	8	5	3
(Slovakia) 2007	4th	9	5	4
(Thailand) 2009	2nd place, silver medalist(s)	9	8	1
(Chile) 2011	2nd place, silver medalist(s)	9	5	4
(Lithuania) 2013	4th	9	7	2
(Russia) 2015	4th	7	3	4
(Italy) 2017	8th	7	3	4
(Thailand) 2019	3rd place, bronze medalist(s)	7	6	1
(Hungary) 2021	7th	7	4	3
(Spain) 2023	2nd place, silver medalist(s)	7	6	1
(Czech Republic) 2025	3rd place, bronze medalist(s)	7	5	1
(China) 2027	Qualified			
Total	15/17	106	67	38

=== U18 EuroBasket ===
Year	Pos.	Pld	W	L
(Bulgaria) 1965	Did not qualify			
(Italy) 1967	Did not qualify			
(Germany) 1969	Did not qualify			
(Socialist Federal Republic of Yugoslavia) 1971	Did not qualify			
(Italy) 1973	8th	7	2	5
(Spain) 1975	6th	7	3	4
(Bulgaria) 1977	11th	7	2	5
(Italy) 1979	Did not qualify			
(Hungary) 1981	9th	7	3	4
(Italy) 1983	8th	7	2	5
(Spain) 1984	4th	7	4	3
(Italy) 1986	12th	7	1	6
(Bulgaria) 1988	6th	7	4	3
(Spain) 1990	2nd place, silver medalist(s)	7	6	1
(Greece) 1992	5th	6	4	2
(Bulgaria) 1994	2nd place, silver medalist(s)	7	6	1
(Slovakia) 1996	4th	7	4	3
(Turkey) 1998	1st place, gold medalist(s)	8	8	0
(Poland) 2000	6th	8	4	4
(Slovenia) 2002	5th	8	6	2
(Slovakia) 2004	2nd place, silver medalist(s)	8	5	3
(Hungary) 2005	2nd place, silver medalist(s)	8	5	3
(Spain) 2006	1st place, gold medalist(s)	8	7	1
(Serbia) 2007	2nd place, silver medalist(s)	8	6	2
(Slovakia) 2008	5th	8	6	2
(Sweden) 2009	1st place, gold medalist(s)	9	9	0
(Slovakia) 2010	2nd place, silver medalist(s)	9	8	1
(Romania) 2011	3rd place, bronze medalist(s)	9	8	1
(Romania) 2012	5th	9	7	2
(Croatia) 2013	1st place, gold medalist(s)	9	9	0
(Portugal) 2014	3rd place, bronze medalist(s)	9	8	1
(Slovenia) 2015	1st place, gold medalist(s)	9	8	1
(Hungary) 2016	2nd place, silver medalist(s)	7	5	2
(Hungary) 2017	6th	7	5	2
(Italy) 2018	2nd place, silver medalist(s)	7	5	2
(Bosnia and Herzegovina) 2019	5th	7	5	2
(Greece) 2022	2nd place, silver medalist(s)	7	6	1
(Turkey) 2023	3rd place, bronze medalist(s)	7	6	1
(Portugal) 2024	2nd place, silver medalist(s)	7	6	1
(Spain) 2025	1st place, gold medalist(s)	7	7	0
(Sweden) 2026	1st place, gold medalist(s)	7	7	0
Total	36/41	273	197	76

== See also ==
- Spain women's national basketball team
- Spain women's national under-17 basketball team
- Spain men's national under-19 basketball team
