= France women's national under-18 and under-19 basketball team =

France
- FIBA zone: FIBA Europe
- National federation: Fédération Française de Basket-Ball

U19 World Cup
- Appearances: 11
- Medals: (silver) Silver: 1 (2013)

U18 EuroBasket
- Appearances: 37
- Medals: (gold) Gold: 3 (2012, 2016, 2024); (silver) Silver: 9 (1981, 2002, 2009, 2011, 2013, 2014, 2015, 2023, 2026); (bronze) Bronze: 6 (2005, 2010, 2017, 2019, 2022, 2025)
Home	Away

The France women's national under-18 and under-19 basketball team is a national basketball team of France and is governed by the Fédération Française de Basket-Ball. It represents the country in under-18 and under-19 women's international basketball competitions.

== Results ==
=== FIBA Under-19 Women's Basketball World Cup ===
Year	Pos.	Pld	W	L
(United States) 1985	DNQ			
(Spain) 1989	DNQ			
(Korea) 1993	6th	7	3	4
(Brazil) 1997	DNQ			
(Czech Republic) 2001	5th	7	5	2
(Tunisia) 2005	DNQ			
(Slovakia) 2007	DNQ			
(Thailand) 2009	7th	9	5	4
(Chile) 2011	6th	9	6	3
(Lithuania) 2013	2nd place, silver medalist(s)	9	7	2
(Russia) 2015	5th	7	5	2
(Italy) 2017	5th	7	5	2
(Thailand) 2019	DNQ			
(Hungary) 2021	4th	7	5	2
(Spain) 2023	4th	7	4	3
(Czech Republic) 2025	5th	6	4	2
(China) 2027	Qualified			
Total	11/17	75	49	26

=== FIBA U18 Women's EuroBasket ===
Year	Result in Division A
1965	8th
1967	9th
1973	11th
1975	10th
1977	10th
1979	10th
1981	2nd place, silver medalist(s)
1983	7th
1984	11th
1986	6th
1988	9th
1990	7th
1992	4th

Year	Result in Division A
1994	5th
1996	7th
1998	10th
2000	5th
2002	2nd place, silver medalist(s)
2004	5th
2005	3rd place, bronze medalist(s)
2006	6th
2007	7th
2008	4th
2009	2nd place, silver medalist(s)
2010	3rd place, bronze medalist(s)
2011	2nd place, silver medalist(s)

Year	Result in Division A
2012	1st place, gold medalist(s)
2013	2nd place, silver medalist(s)
2014	2nd place, silver medalist(s)
2015	2nd place, silver medalist(s)
2016	1st place, gold medalist(s)
2017	3rd place, bronze medalist(s)
2018	7th
2019	3rd place, bronze medalist(s)
2022	3rd place, bronze medalist(s)
2023	2nd place, silver medalist(s)
2024	1st place, gold medalist(s)
2025	3rd place, bronze medalist(s)
2026	2nd place, silver medalist(s)

== See also ==
- France women's national basketball team
- France women's national under-17 basketball team
- France men's national under-19 basketball team
