= Iva Prčić =

Serbian basketball player

Personal information
- Born: 17 February 1987 (age 39) Subotica, SR Serbia, SFR Yugoslavia
- Listed height: 1.77 m (5 ft 10 in)

Career information
- WNBA draft: 2009: undrafted
- Playing career: 2003–2010
- Position: Shooting guard

Career history
- 2003–2005: Spartak Subotica
- 2005–2008: Crvena zvezda
- 2009–2010: Spartak Subotica
Medals
Women's basketball
Representing Serbia
World U19 Championship
Silver medal – second place	2005 Tunisia	Team
European U18 Championship
Gold medal – first place	2005 Hungary	Team
European U16 Championship
Gold medal – first place	2003 Turkey	Team

Iva Prčić (Serbian: Ива Прчић; born 17 February 1987) is a former Serbian female basketball player.

== Personal life ==
Iva is a twin sister of Serbian basketball player Dunja Prčić.
