= 2012 FIBA Europe Under-18 Championship for Women =

2012 FIBA U18 Women's European Championship
29th FIBA Under-18 Women's European Basketball Championship

Tournament details
- Host country: Romania
- Dates: 26 July – 5 August 2012
- Teams: 16
- Venues: 2 (in 1 host city)

Final positions
- Champions: France (1st title)

Official website
- www.fibaeurope.com

The 2012 FIBA Europe Under-18 Championship for Women was the 29th edition of the FIBA Europe Under-18 Championship for Women. 16 teams featured in the competition, held in Romania from 26 July to 5 August 2012.

== Participating teams ==
- Belgium
- Croatia ▲ (Winners, 2011 FIBA Europe Women's Under-18 Championship Division B)
- Czech Republic
- France
- Greece ▲ (Runners-up, 2011 FIBA Europe Women's Under-18 Championship Division B)
- Italy
- Netherlands
- Poland
- Romania
- Russia
- Serbia
- Slovakia
- Slovenia
- Spain
- Sweden
- Turkey

== Final standings ==
Rank	Team
1st place, gold medalist(s)	France
2nd place, silver medalist(s)	Russia
3rd place, bronze medalist(s)	Serbia
4th	Netherlands
5th	Spain
6th	Turkey
7th	Croatia
8th	Italy
9th	Slovakia
10th	Sweden
11th	Greece
12th	Slovenia
13th	Czech Republic
14th	Poland
15th	Belgium
16th	Romania

2012 FIBA Europe Women's Under-18 Championship winners

France
First title

Team qualified for the 2013 FIBA Under-19 World Championship for Women
Team relegated to 2013 Division B
