= Lycée Alain =

Senior high school in Le Vésinet, France

Coordinates: 48.8911°N 2.1218°E

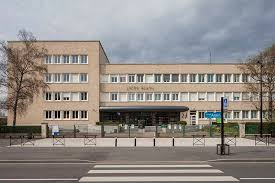
Lycée Alain, Le Vésinet, Yvelines

Lycée Alain is a senior high school/sixth form college in Le Vésinet, Yvelines, France, in the Paris metropolitan area.

It is named after Émile Chartier, a.k.a. "Alain".
