= 2024 FIBA U18 Women's EuroBasket =

International basketball competition

Tournament details
- Host country: Portugal
- City: Matosinhos
- Dates: 3–11 August 2024
- Teams: 16 (from 1 confederation)
- Venues: 2 (in 1 host city)

Final positions
- Champions: France (3rd title)
- Runners-up: Spain
- Third place: Serbia
- Fourth place: Israel

Tournament statistics
- Games played: 56
- Attendance: 20,509 (366 per game)
- MVP: (France) Nell Angloma
- Top scorer: (Luxembourg) Joyce Isi Etute (Portugal) Clara Silva (18.7 points per game)

Official website
- www.fiba.basketball

The 2024 FIBA U18 Women's EuroBasket was the 39th edition of the European basketball championship for women's national under-18 teams. The tournament was played in Matosinhos, Portugal, from 3 to 11 August 2024.

This is also the FIBA Europe's qualifying tournament for the 2025 FIBA Under-19 Women's Basketball World Cup in Czechia. Top five teams will join the automatically qualified hosts Czechia.

== Participating teams ==
- Belgium
- Croatia ▲ (Winners, 2023 FIBA U18 Women's European Championship Division B)
- Finland
- France
- Germany
- Hungary
- Israel
- Italy
- Latvia
- Luxembourg ▲ (Runners-up, 2023 FIBA U18 Women's European Championship Division B)
- Poland
- Portugal
- Serbia
- Slovenia
- Spain
- Turkey

== First round ==
The draw of the first round was held on 6 February 2024 in Freising, Germany.

In the first round, the teams were drawn into four groups of four. All teams advance to the playoffs.

All times are local (Western European Summer Time – UTC+1).

=== Group A ===
Pos	Team	Pld	W	L	PF	PA	PD	Pts
1	Spain	3	3	0	226	145	+81	6
2	Turkey	3	2	1	190	176	+14	5
3	Slovenia	3	1	2	152	195	−43	4
4	Latvia	3	0	3	149	201	−52	3

Source: FIBA

3 August 2024
18:00

Boxscore

Latvia	51–60	Turkey
Scoring by quarter: 12–12, 12–19, 12–15, 15–14
Pts: Petrus 14; Rebs: Liepina 11; Asts: Four players 2		Pts: Vural 17; Rebs: Güler 9 Asts: Barnes 5

Pavilhão Municipal de Guifões
Attendance: 75
Referees: Jelena Tomic (CRO), Amalia Marchiş (ROU), Nermin Hodzic (GER)

3 August 2024
20:30

Boxscore

Spain	74–38	Slovenia
Scoring by quarter: 23–8, 16–11, 19–8, 16–11
Pts: Fam 15; Rebs: Fam, Sotelo 8 Asts: Sotelo 4		Pts: Uranker 15; Rebs: Valancic 8 Asts: Jerkovic 3

Pavilhão Municipal de Guifões
Attendance: 70
Referees: Branimir Galić (CRO), Laure Coanus (FRA), Vladimir Jevtovic (SRB)

4 August 2024
15:30

Boxscore

Turkey	63–73	Spain
Scoring by quarter: 15–33, 14–9, 19–17, 15–14
Pts: Vural, Barnes 13; Rebs: Güler 7 Asts: Güler 4		Pts: Fam 18; Rebs: Fam 17; Asts: Martín Carrión 7

Centro de Desportos e Congressos de Matosinhos
Referees: Geert Jacobs (BEL), Henri Hilke (FIN), Nemanja Vlahovic (SRB)

4 August 2024
20:30

Boxscore

Slovenia	62–54	Latvia
Scoring by quarter: 15–18, 15–10, 18–12, 14–14
Pts: Uranker 20; Rebs: Turnsek 10; Asts: Jerkovic 4		Pts: Liepina 11; Rebs: Liepina 9 Asts: Smite 5

Centro de Desportos e Congressos de Matosinhos
Attendance: 95
Referees: Zdenko Tomasovic (SVK), Ewa Matuszewska (POL), Julien Malane (LUX)

5 August 2024
15:30

Boxscore

Slovenia	52–67	Turkey
Scoring by quarter: 13–20, 10–14, 9–17, 20–16
Pts: Uranker 15; Rebs: Turnsek 8 Asts: Three players 2		Pts: Toremis, Vural 12; Rebs: Yilik 8 Asts: Güler 6

Pavilhão Municipal de Guifões
Attendance: 37
Referees: Paulina Karolina Gajdosz (POL), Viktor Nagy (HUN), Joana Pessoa (POR)

5 August 2024
20:30

Boxscore

Latvia	44–79	Spain
Scoring by quarter: 3–19, 11–20, 12–19, 18–21
Pts: Liepina 12; Rebs: Palma, Liepina 5 Asts: Otto, Brikmane 3		Pts: Rodríguez 16; Rebs: Fam 9 Asts: Martín Carrión 5

Pavilhão Municipal de Guifões
Attendance: 68
Referees: Silvia Marziali (ITA), Veronika Vavrova (CZE), Hendrik Laas (EST)

=== Group B ===
Pos	Team	Pld	W	L	PF	PA	PD	Pts
1	France	3	3	0	250	130	+120	6
2	Finland	3	2	1	233	235	−2	5
3	Israel	3	1	2	217	223	−6	4
4	Luxembourg	3	0	3	156	268	−112	3

Source: FIBA

3 August 2024
13:00

Boxscore

Finland	89–79	Israel
Scoring by quarter: 28–23, 16–22, 19–14, 26–20
Pts: Onnela 21; Rebs: Ogun 15; Asts: Four players 4		Pts: Raviv 24; Rebs: Baico Zemmel 9 Asts: Raviv 9

Pavilhão Municipal de Guifões
Attendance: 50
Referees: Cisil Güngör (TUR), Nemanja Vlahovic (SRB), Anna Belousova (LAT)

3 August 2024
15:30

Boxscore

France	84–32	Luxembourg
Scoring by quarter: 24–8, 16–3, 19–13, 25–8
Pts: Cleante 17; Rebs: Angloma 10; Asts: Kessler 7		Pts: Hamalainen 14; Rebs: Etute 8 Asts: Blasen 2

Pavilhão Municipal de Guifões
Attendance: 60
Referees: Zdenko Tomasovic (SVK), Veronika Vavrova (CZE), Matic Palcic (SLO)

4 August 2024
13:00

Boxscore

Luxembourg	63–89	Finland
Scoring by quarter: 11–17, 16–24, 15–28, 21–20
Pts: Etute 15; Rebs: Etute 13; Asts: Etute 4		Pts: Onnela 16; Rebs: Ogun 9 Asts: Nordberg, Mace 3

Centro de Desportos e Congressos de Matosinhos
Referees: Silvia Marziali (ITA), Viktor Nagy (HUN), Hendrik Laas (EST)

4 August 2024
20:30

Boxscore

Israel	43–73	France
Scoring by quarter: 19–17, 11–23, 4–20, 9–13
Pts: Raviv 17; Rebs: Teichman 8 Asts: Raviv 2		Pts: Angloma 26; Rebs: Colas 10; Asts: Kessler 4

Pavilhão Municipal de Guifões
Attendance: 48
Referees: Paulina Karolina Gajdosz (POL), Joana Pessoa (POR), Vladimir Jevtovic (SRB)

5 August 2024
15:30

Boxscore

Luxembourg	61–95	Israel
Scoring by quarter: 12–28, 20–24, 14–24, 15–19
Pts: Hamalainen 25; Rebs: Etute 16; Asts: Marin Dawid, Lepage 3		Pts: Teichman 22; Rebs: Raviv 9 Asts: Oren 7

Centro de Desportos e Congressos de Matosinhos
Attendance: 115
Referees: Jelena Tomic (CRO), Cisil Güngör (TUR), Branimir Galić (CRO)

5 August 2024
18:00

Boxscore

Finland	55–93	France
Scoring by quarter: 12–23, 18–24, 21–25, 4–21
Pts: Onnela 14; Rebs: Ogun 8 Asts: Talonen, Mace 3		Pts: Angloma 24; Rebs: Keita-Cissoko, Angloma 5 Asts: Kessler, Angloma 3

Centro de Desportos e Congressos de Matosinhos
Attendance: 384
Referees: Özlem Yalman (TUR), Joaquin Garcia Gonzalez (ESP), Nermin Hodzic (GER)

=== Group C ===
Pos	Team	Pld	W	L	PF	PA	PD	Pts
1	Portugal	3	3	0	205	164	+41	6
2	Italy	3	2	1	191	181	+10	5
3	Germany	3	1	2	174	207	−33	4
4	Serbia	3	0	3	190	208	−18	3

Source: FIBA

3 August 2024
18:00

Boxscore

Germany	72–64	Serbia
Scoring by quarter: 25–18, 20–15, 16–19, 11–12
Pts: Englisch 17; Rebs: Bielefeld 14; Asts: Perner, Bielefeld 4		Pts: Popovic 18; Rebs: Brenjo 12; Asts: Popovic 5

Centro de Desportos e Congressos de Matosinhos
Attendance: 223
Referees: Geert Jacobs (BEL), Joaquin Garcia Gonzalez (ESP), Viktor Nagy (HUN)

3 August 2024
20:30

Boxscore

Italy	49–68	Portugal
Scoring by quarter: 11–27, 27–17, 9–11, 2–13
Pts: Giacchetti 14; Rebs: Zuccon 11; Asts: Three players 1		Pts: Cl. Silva 17; Rebs: Cl. Silva 10; Asts: Three players 3

Centro de Desportos e Congressos de Matosinhos
Attendance: 1,900
Referees: Paulina Karolina Gajdosz (POL), Sandra Sanchez Gonzalez (ESP), Ewa Matuszewska (POL)

4 August 2024
15:30

Boxscore

Serbia	66–68	Italy
Scoring by quarter: 17–20, 22–27, 14–18, 13–3
Pts: Davorija 18; Rebs: Predojevic 14; Asts: Vesic 4		Pts: Giacchetti 24; Rebs: Zuccon 11; Asts: Giacchetti 6

Pavilhão Municipal de Guifões
Attendance: 150
Referees: Jelena Tomic (CRO), Amalia Marchiş (ROU), Matic Palcic (SLO)

4 August 2024
18:00

Boxscore

Portugal	69–55	Germany
Scoring by quarter: 17–11, 21–12, 16–15, 15–17
Pts: Cl. Silva 28; Rebs: Fernandes, Cl. Silva 7 Asts: Andorinho 4		Pts: Huppertz 16; Rebs: Bielefeld 5 Asts: Perner, Emanga 3

Centro de Desportos e Congressos de Matosinhos
Attendance: 2,230
Referees: Özlem Yalman (TUR), Branimir Galić (CRO), Anna Belousova (LAT)

5 August 2024
13:00

Boxscore

Germany	47–74	Italy
Scoring by quarter: 19–21, 8–19, 12–25, 8–9
Pts: Englisch 14; Rebs: Englisch 10; Asts: Bielefeld 7		Pts: Torresani 18; Rebs: Torresani 11; Asts: Giacchetti 7

Pavilhão Municipal de Guifões
Attendance: 71
Referees: Sandra Sanchez Gonzalez (ESP), Henri Hilke (FIN), Laure Coanus (FRA)

5 August 2024
20:30

Boxscore

Portugal	68–60	Serbia
Scoring by quarter: 16–22, 18–14, 10–14, 24–10
Pts: Cl. Silva 16; Rebs: Cl. Silva 6 Asts: Cl. Silva 6		Pts: Popovic 15; Rebs: Davorija 7 Asts: Cosovic 3

Centro de Desportos e Congressos de Matosinhos
Attendance: 1,763
Referees: Geert Jacobs (BEL), Ewa Matuszewska (POL), Julien Malane (LUX)

=== Group D ===
Pos	Team	Pld	W	L	PF	PA	PD	Pts
1	Poland	3	2	1	197	182	+15	5
2	Belgium	3	2	1	185	183	+2	5
3	Hungary	3	1	2	167	163	+4	4
4	Croatia	3	1	2	179	200	−21	4

Source: FIBA

3 August 2024
13:00

Boxscore

Poland	64–58	Belgium
Scoring by quarter: 18–10, 18–20, 9–13, 19–15
Pts: Wiklak 13; Rebs: Wiklak 8 Asts: Four players 2		Pts: Declercq 13; Rebs: Bayart 10; Asts: Five players 2

Centro de Desportos e Congressos de Matosinhos
Attendance: 49
Referees: Silvia Marziali (ITA), Henri Hilke (FIN), Julien Malane (LUX)

3 August 2024
15:30

Boxscore

Hungary	63–40	Croatia
Scoring by quarter: 12–11, 19–6, 13–9, 19–14
Pts: Three players 11; Rebs: Farbas 10; Asts: Ratkai 6		Pts: Bilic 13; Rebs: Bozan 9 Asts: Bilic 3

Centro de Desportos e Congressos de Matosinhos
Attendance: 130
Referees: Özlem Yalman (TUR), Joana Pessoa (POR), Hendrik Laas (EST)

4 August 2024
13:00

Boxscore

Croatia	75–70	Poland
Scoring by quarter: 24–13, 20–16, 12–19, 19–22
Pts: Bilic 22; Rebs: Bozan 12; Asts: Majstorovic 5		Pts: Rutkowska 15; Rebs: Rutkowska 11; Asts: Wysocka 5

Pavilhão Municipal de Guifões
Attendance: 65
Referees: Joaquin Garcia Gonzalez (ESP), Cisil Güngör (TUR), Nermin Hodzic (GER)

4 August 2024
18:00

Boxscore

Belgium	60–55	Hungary
Scoring by quarter: 11–10, 20–20, 13–20, 16–5
Pts: Declercq 12; Rebs: Dupont 8 Asts: Verburgt 4		Pts: Toman 14; Rebs: Ratkai 7 Asts: Ratkai 6

Pavilhão Municipal de Guifões
Attendance: 57
Referees: Laure Coanus (FRA), Sandra Sanchez Gonzalez (ESP), Veronika Vavrova (CZE)

5 August 2024
13:00

Boxscore

Croatia	64–67	Belgium
Scoring by quarter: 18–21, 10–15, 20–21, 16–10
Pts: Bozan 21; Rebs: Bozan 9 Asts: Bilic 6		Pts: Verburgt 18; Rebs: Dupont, Verburgt 5 Asts: Bevernage, Declercq 4

Centro de Desportos e Congressos de Matosinhos
Attendance: 95
Referees: Amalia Marchiş (ROU), Nemanja Vlahovic (SRB), Anna Belousova (LAT)

5 August 2024
18:00

Boxscore

Poland	63–49	Hungary
Scoring by quarter: 11–14, 12–16, 22–7, 18–12
Pts: Rutkowska 17; Rebs: Burliga 8 Asts: Wysocka 6		Pts: Kokai, Gabor 8 Rebs: Farbas 8 Asts: Ratkai 6

Pavilhão Municipal de Guifões
Attendance: 37
Referees: Zdenko Tomasovic (SVK), Vladimir Jevtovic (SRB), Matic Palcic (SLO)

== Playoff brackets ==
=== Main bracket ===
Round of 16
7 August
A1 Spain	91
B4 Luxembourg	52
7 August
C2 Italy	66
D3 Hungary	67
7 August
B2 Finland	69
A3 Slovenia	59
7 August
D1 Poland	57
C4 Serbia	71
7 August
A2 Turkey	71
B3 Israel	80
7 August
C1 Portugal	63
D4 Croatia	56
7 August
B1 France	89
A4 Latvia	39
7 August
D2 Belgium	69
C3 Germany	64

Quarterfinals
8 August
Spain	95
Hungary	46
8 August
Finland	70
Serbia	76
8 August
Israel	68
Portugal	64
8 August
France	87
Belgium	48

Semifinals
10 August
Spain	68
Serbia	45
10 August
Israel	27
France	95

Final
11 August
Spain	70
France	80
3rd place match
11 August
Serbia	72
Israel	56

=== 5th place bracket ===
5th–8th place semifinals
10 August
Hungary	73
Finland	55
10 August
Portugal	77
Belgium	61

5th place match
11 August
Hungary	63
Portugal	69
7th place match
11 August
Finland	53
Belgium	68

=== 9th place bracket ===
9th–16th place quarterfinals
8 August
Luxembourg	53
Italy	77
8 August
Slovenia	57
Poland	66
8 August
Turkey	81
Croatia	73
8 August
Latvia	82
Germany	73

9th–12th place semifinals
10 August
Italy	72
Poland	52
10 August
Turkey	64
Latvia	76

9th place match
11 August
Italy	75
Latvia	60
11th place match
11 August
Poland	74
Turkey	69

=== 13th place bracket ===
13th–16th place semifinals
10 August
Luxembourg	58
Slovenia	91
10 August
Croatia	82
Germany	77

13th place match
11 August
Slovenia	57
Croatia	56
15th place match
11 Jugust
Luxembourg	58
Germany	76

== Playoff results ==
=== Round of 16 ===
7 August 2024
13:00

Boxscore

Spain	91–52	Luxembourg
Scoring by quarter: 23–18, 16–10, 26–6, 26–18
Pts: Sotelo 20; Rebs: Rodríguez 9 Asts: Garcia 6		Pts: Hamalainen 19; Rebs: Etute 11; Asts: Hamalainen 3

Centro de Desportos e Congressos de Matosinhos
Attendance: 95
Referees: Henri Hilke (FIN), Nermin Hodzic (GER), Matic Palcic (SLO)

7 August 2024
13:00

Boxscore

Finland	69–59	Slovenia
Scoring by quarter: 10–15, 27–14, 13–16, 19–14
Pts: Mace 18; Rebs: Ogun 12; Asts: Talonen 4		Pts: Uranker 20; Rebs: Turnsek 11; Asts: Valancic 5

Pavilhao Municipal de Guiföes
Attendance: 67
Referees: Jelena Tomic (CRO), Veronika Vavrova (CZE), Julien Malane (LUX)

7 August 2024
15:30

Boxscore

Italy	66–67	Hungary
Scoring by quarter: 18–20, 12–11, 21–20, 15–16
Pts: Trozzola 15; Rebs: Leghissa 8 Asts: Giacchetti 7		Pts: D. Toman 18; Rebs: Kokai 7 Asts: Ratkai 9

Centro de Desportos e Congressos de Matosinhos
Attendance: 85
Referees: Branimir Galić (CRO), Paulina Karolina Gajdosz (POL), Anna Belousova (LAT)

7 August 2024
15:30

Boxscore

Poland	57–71	Serbia
Scoring by quarter: 12–17, 9–15, 19–21, 17–18
Pts: Rutkowska 19; Rebs: Rutkowska, Brzustowska 6 Asts: Three players 3		Pts: Popovic 18; Rebs: Brenjo 8 Asts: Popovic 7

Pavilhao Municipal de Guiföes
Attendance: 68
Referees: Özlem Yalman (TUR), Silvia Marziali (ITA), Hendrik Laas (EST)

7 August 2024
18:00

Boxscore

Turkey	71–80	Israel
Scoring by quarter: 19–30, 16–20, 17–14, 19–16
Pts: Güler 21; Rebs: Yeniculha 13; Asts: Ulker 6		Pts: Raviv 23; Rebs: Oren 12; Asts: Raviv 6

Centro de Desportos e Congressos de Matosinhos
Attendance: 150
Referees: Geert Jacobs (BEL), Joaquin Garcia Gonzalez (ESP), Vladimir Jevtovic (SRB)

7 August 2024
18:00

Boxscore

France	89–39	Latvia
Scoring by quarter: 29–2, 17–15, 22–6, 21–16
Pts: Cisse 18; Rebs: Cisse 6 Asts: Selle, Angloma 5		Pts: Brence 12; Rebs: Liepina 8 Asts: Petrus 3

Pavilhao Municipal de Guiföes
Attendance: 46
Referees: Ewa Matuszewska (POL), Sandra Sanchez Gonzalez (ESP), Nemanja Vlahovic (SRB)

7 August 2024
20:30

Boxscore

Portugal	63–56	Croatia
Scoring by quarter: 13–19, 21–16, 18–8, 11–13
Pts: Cl. Silva 20; Rebs: Cl. Silva 11; Asts: Freire 6		Pts: Bozan 19; Rebs: Bozan 8 Asts: Bilic 5

Centro de Desportos e Congressos de Matosinhos
Attendance: 2,500
Referees: Zdenko Tomasovic (SVK), Viktor Nagy (HUN), Laure Coanus (FRA)

7 August 2024
20:30

Boxscore

Belgium	69–64	Germany
Scoring by quarter: 20–14, 14–15, 14–19, 21–16
Pts: Verburgt 18; Rebs: Verburgt 11; Asts: Three players 3		Pts: Perner 18; Rebs: Bielefeld 10; Asts: Bielefeld 4

Pavilhao Municipal de Guiföes
Attendance: 51
Referees: Cisil Güngör (TUR), Amalia Marchiş (ROU), Joana Pessoa (POR)

=== 9th–16th place quarterfinals ===
8 August 2024
13:00

Boxscore

Luxembourg	53–77	Italy
Scoring by quarter: 13–18, 15–23, 17–13, 8–23
Pts: Etute 24; Rebs: Etute 15; Asts: Four players 2		Pts: Zuccon 19; Rebs: Zuccon 19; Asts: Giacchetti 7

Pavilhao Municipal de Guiföes
Attendance: 28
Referees: Jelena Tomic (CRO), Joaquin Garcia Gonzalez (ESP), Vladimir Jevtovic (SRB)

8 August 2024
15:30

Boxscore

Slovenia	57–66	Poland
Scoring by quarter: 22–7, 14–20, 13–21, 8–18
Pts: Turnsek 19; Rebs: Turnsek 12; Asts: Jelenc, Grebenc 4		Pts: Rutkowska 17; Rebs: Rutkowska 10; Asts: Koryzna 5

Pavilhao Municipal de Guiföes
Attendance: 23
Referees: Branimir Galić (CRO), Joana Pessoa (POR), Anna Belousova (LAT)

8 August 2024
18:00

Boxscore

Latvia	82–73	Germany
Scoring by quarter: 20–25, 25–22, 17–4, 20–22
Pts: Liepina 23; Rebs: Liepina 16; Asts: Smite 9		Pts: Esser 22; Rebs: Bielefeld 13; Asts: Perner 6

Pavilhao Municipal de Guiföes
Attendance: 85
Referees: Henri Hilke (FIN), Veronika Vavrova (CZE), Julien Malane (LUX)

8 August 2024
20:30

Boxscore

Turkey	81–73	Croatia
Scoring by quarter: 20–21, 21–19, 21–17, 19–16
Pts: Barnes 19; Rebs: Yeniculha 7 Asts: Vural 6		Pts: Bozan 25; Rebs: Bozan 17; Asts: Bilic 12

Pavilhao Municipal de Guiföes
Attendance: 45
Referees: Silvia Marziali (ITA), Sandra Sanchez Gonzalez (ESP), Matic Palcic (SLO)

=== 13th–16th place semifinals ===
10 August 2024
13:00

Boxscore

Luxembourg	58–91	Slovenia
Scoring by quarter: 20–24, 20–25, 5–23, 13–19
Pts: Hamalainen 25; Rebs: Etute 11; Asts: Etute 5		Pts: Uranker 17; Rebs: Three players 6 Asts: Three players 3

Pavilhao Municipal de Guiföes
Attendance: 29
Referees: Sandra Sanchez Gonzalez (ESP), Henri Hilke (FIN), Amalia Marchiş (ROU)

10 August 2024
15:30

Boxscore

Croatia	82–77	Germany
Scoring by quarter: 17–14, 11–24, 24–19, 30–20
Pts: Pirjak, Vukic 22; Rebs: Vukic 8 Asts: Vukic 5		Pts: Esser 20; Rebs: Englisch 13; Asts: Bielefeld 7

Pavilhao Municipal de Guiföes
Attendance: 70
Referees: Geert Jacobs (BEL), Nemanja Vlahovic (SRB), Anna Belousova (LAT)

=== 15th place match ===
11 August 2024
10:30

Boxscore

Luxembourg	58–76	Germany
Scoring by quarter: 8–22, 24–15, 7–21, 19–18
Pts: Etute 26; Rebs: Etute 20; Asts: Marin Dawid 4		Pts: Drantmann 14; Rebs: Bielefeld 10; Asts: Bielefeld 10

Pavilhao Municipal de Guiföes
Attendance: 45
Referees: Hendrik Laas (EST), Anna Belousova (LAT), Matic Palcic (SLO)

=== 13th place match ===
11 August 2024
12:30

Boxscore

Slovenia	57–56	Croatia
Scoring by quarter: 15–11, 20–10, 12–21, 10–14
Pts: Turnsek 16; Rebs: Turnsek 11; Asts: Grebenc 7		Pts: Bilic 21; Rebs: Bilic 10; Asts: Bilic 5

Pavilhao Municipal de Guiföes
Attendance: 55
Referees: Sandra Sanchez Gonzalez (ESP), Viktor Nagy (HUN), Veronika Vavrova (CZE)

=== 9th–12th place semifinals ===
10 August 2024
18:00

Boxscore

Italy	72–52	Poland
Scoring by quarter: 24–11, 14–14, 22–11, 12–16
Pts: Trozzola 18; Rebs: Zuccon, Leghissa 9 Asts: Giacchetti 4		Pts: Rutkowska 12; Rebs: Rutkowska 10; Asts: Glowczak 3

Pavilhao Municipal de Guiföes
Attendance: 56
Referees: Veronika Vavrova (CZE), Julien Malane (LUX), Matic Palcic (SLO)

10 August 2024
20:30

Boxscore

Turkey	64–76	Latvia
Scoring by quarter: 20–16, 11–26, 16–22, 17–12
Pts: Ulker 25; Rebs: Atli 5 Asts: Ulker 4		Pts: Liepina 18; Rebs: Otto, Liepina 8 Asts: Smite, Otto 4

Pavilhao Municipal de Guiföes
Attendance: 15
Referees: Laure Coanus (FRA), Joana Pessoa (POR), Hendrik Laas (EST)

=== 11th place match ===
11 August 2024
13:00

Boxscore

Poland	74–69	Turkey
Scoring by quarter: 20–17, 21–24, 17–17, 16–11
Pts: Brzustowska 17; Rebs: Rutkowska 14; Asts: Kloska, Wysocka 3		Pts: Güler 14; Rebs: Yilik 8 Asts: Toremis 3

Pavilhao Municipal de Guiföes
Attendance: 40
Referees: Silvia Marziali (ITA), Amalia Marchiş (ROU), Henri Hilke (FIN)

=== 9th place match ===
11 August 2024
15:30

Boxscore

Italy	75–60	Latvia
Scoring by quarter: 28–18, 21–15, 7–15, 19–12
Pts: Trozzola 27; Rebs: Piatti 6 Asts: Giacchetti, Trozzola 5		Pts: Brence 14; Rebs: Liepina 12; Asts: Liepina 4

Pavilhao Municipal de Guiföes
Attendance: 22
Referees: Jelena Tomic (CRO), Vladimir Jevtovic (SRB), Julien Malane (LUX)

=== Championship quarterfinals ===
8 August 2024
13:00

Boxscore

Spain	95–46	Hungary
Scoring by quarter: 24–11, 28–11, 18–9, 25–15
Pts: Fam 22; Rebs: Fam 13; Asts: Martín Carrión 6		Pts: Josepovits 10; Rebs: Josepovits 11; Asts: Gabor, Ratkai 3

Centro de Desportos e Congressos de Matosinhos
Attendance: 130
Referees: Geert Jacobs (BEL), Cisil Güngör (TUR), Laure Coanus (FRA)

8 August 2024
17:30

Boxscore

Finland	70–76	Serbia
Scoring by quarter: 22–17, 21–22, 13–17, 14–20
Pts: Talonen 20; Rebs: Onnela 7 Asts: Onnela 4		Pts: Davorija 17; Rebs: Brenjo 10; Asts: Popovic 4

Centro de Desportos e Congressos de Matosinhos
Attendance: 50
Referees: Ewa Matuszewska (POL), Paulina Karolina Gajdosz (POL), Nermin Hodzic (GER)

8 August 2024
18:00

Boxscore

France	87–48	Belgium
Scoring by quarter: 26–11, 22–9, 25–15, 14–13
Pts: Cleante 18; Rebs: Selle 8 Asts: Tagayi, Cleante 5		Pts: Three players 8 Rebs: Cop 6 Asts: Three players 2

Centro de Desportos e Congressos de Matosinhos
Attendance: 214
Referees: Zdenko Tomasovic (SVK), Viktor Nagy (HUN), Hendrik Laas (EST)

8 August 2024
20:30

Boxscore

Israel	68–64	Portugal
Scoring by quarter: 12–17, 21–16, 17–19, 18–12
Pts: Raviv 20; Rebs: Oren 10; Asts: Raviv 7		Pts: Peixinho 20; Rebs: Cl. Silva 10; Asts: Peixinho, Cl. Silva 4

Centro de Desportos e Congressos de Matosinhos
Attendance: 2,300
Referees: Özlem Yalman (TUR), Nemanja Vlahovic (SRB), Amalia Marchiş (ROU)

=== 5th–8th place semifinals ===
10 August 2024
13:00

Boxscore

Hungary	73–55	Finland
Scoring by quarter: 14–5, 16–15, 24–17, 19–18
Pts: Ratkai 17; Rebs: Farbas 10; Asts: Kokai, D. Toman 4		Pts: Onnela 13; Rebs: Onnela 8 Asts: Talonen 5

Centro de Desportos e Congressos de Matosinhos
Attendance: 34
Referees: Özlem Yalman (TUR), Silvia Marziali (ITA), Vladimir Jevtovic (SRB)

10 August 2024
15:30

Boxscore

Portugal	77–61	Belgium
Scoring by quarter: 15–10, 24–21, 22–16, 16–14
Pts: Cl. Silva 19; Rebs: Ca. Silva 6 Asts: Cl. Silva 6		Pts: Bevernage 18; Rebs: Verburgt 10; Asts: Declercq 3

Centro de Desportos e Congressos de Matosinhos
Attendance: 1,245
Referees: Branimir Galić (CRO), Joaquin Garcia Gonzalez (ESP), Paulina Karolina Gajdosz (POL)

=== 7th place match ===
11 August 2024
18:00

Boxscore

Finland	53–68	Belgium
Scoring by quarter: 18–21, 13–17, 16–14, 6–16
Pts: Onnela 12; Rebs: Jokela 9 Asts: Jokela, Mace 2		Pts: Bayart 22; Rebs: Bayart 13; Asts: Bevernage 8

Pavilhao Municipal de Guiföes
Attendance: 44
Referees: Joana Pessoa (POR), Laure Coanus (FRA), Nemanja Vlahovic (SRB)

=== 5th place match ===
11 August 2024
15:00

Boxscore

Hungary	63–69	Portugal
Scoring by quarter: 18–17, 24–17, 10–15, 11–20
Pts: Ratkai 12; Rebs: Farbas 13; Asts: D. Toman, Farbas 5		Pts: Karim 22; Rebs: Ca. Silva 7 Asts: Nazario 4

Centro de Desportos e Congressos de Matosinhos
Attendance: 2,445
Referees: Zdenko Tomasovic (SVK), Cisil Güngör (TUR), Nermin Hodzic (GER)

=== Championship semifinals ===
10 August 2024
18:00

Boxscore

Spain	68–45	Serbia
Scoring by quarter: 20–10, 23–13, 9–12, 16–10
Pts: Fam 21; Rebs: Fam 15; Asts: Garcia 8		Pts: Aleksic 13; Rebs: Brenjo 6 Asts: Popovic 3

Centro de Desportos e Congressos de Matosinhos
Attendance: 225
Referees: Zdenko Tomasovic (SVK), Cisil Güngör (TUR), Viktor Nagy (HUN)

10 August 2024
20:30

Boxscore

Israel	27–95	France
Scoring by quarter: 15–24, 7–22, 2–20, 3–29
Pts: Oren 8 Rebs: Teichman, Oren 4 Asts: Teichman, Raviv 1		Pts: Kessler, Angloma 16; Rebs: Angloma 12; Asts: Colas 6

Centro de Desportos e Congressos de Matosinhos
Attendance: 125
Referees: Jelena Tomic (CRO), Ewa Matuszewska (POL), Nermin Hodzic (GER)

=== 3rd place match ===
11 August 2024
17:30

Boxscore

Serbia	72–56	Israel
Scoring by quarter: 11–17, 17–11, 22–13, 22–15
Pts: Popovic 28; Rebs: Davorija, Popovic 7 Asts: Popovic 6		Pts: Raviv 16; Rebs: Baico Zemmel 7 Asts: Teichman, Oren 3

Centro de Desportos e Congressos de Matosinhos
Attendance: 200
Referees: Özlem Yalman (TUR), Joaquin Garcia Gonzalez (ESP), Paulina Karolina Gajdosz (POL)

=== Final ===
11 July 2023
20:00

Boxscore

Spain	70–80	France
Scoring by quarter: 16–12, 12–20, 18–30, 24–18
Pts: Martín Carrión 24; Rebs: Fam 7 Asts: Martin Carrion, Garcia 4		Pts: Cisse 22; Rebs: Keboum Biamou 10; Asts: Cleante 7

Centro de Desportos e Congressos de Matosinhos
Attendance: 2,150
Referees: Geert Jacobs (BEL), Ewa Matuszewska (POL), Branimir Galić (CRO)

== Final standings ==
Rank	Team	Record
1st place, gold medalist(s)	France	7–0
2nd place, silver medalist(s)	Spain	6–1
3rd place, bronze medalist(s)	Serbia	3–4
4	Israel	3–4
5	Portugal	6–1
6	Hungary	3–4
7	Belgium	4–3
8	Finland	3–4
9	Italy	5–2
10	Latvia	2–5
11	Poland	4–3
12	Turkey	3–4
13	Slovenia	3–4
14	Croatia	2–5
15	Germany	2–5
16	Luxembourg	0–7

Qualified for the 2025 FIBA Under-19 Women's Basketball World Cup
Qualified for the 2025 FIBA Under-19 Women's Basketball World Cup as a substitute for Serbia
Relegated to the 2025 FIBA U18 Women's EuroBasket Division B

== Statistics and awards ==
=== Statistical leaders ===
==== Players ====
Points

Name	PPG
(Luxembourg) Joyce Isi Etute	18.7
(Portugal) Clara Silva	18.7
(Luxembourg) Isa Hamalainen	18.0
(Israel) Gal Raviv	17.3
(Serbia) Jovana Popovic	16.3

Rebounds

Name	RPG
(Luxembourg) Joyce Isi Etute	13.4
(Spain) Awa Fam	10.7
(Croatia) Petra Bozan	10.0
(Latvia) Anna Liepina	9.9
(Germany) Clara Bielefeld	9.4

Assists

Name	APG
(Croatia) Lena Bilic	5.6
(Germany) Clara Bielefeld	5.4
(Italy) Emma Giacchetti	5.3
(Hungary) Eszter Ratkai	5.1
(Spain) Iyana Martín Carrión	5.0

Blocks

Name	BPG
(Poland) Natalia Rutkowska	2.1
(Germany) Clara Bielefeld	2.0
(Portugal) Clara Silva	2.0
(Slovenia) Romana Jelenc	1.7
(Croatia) Petra Bozan	1.6

Steals

Name	SPG
(Italy) Emma Giacchetti	4.0
(Luxembourg) Joyce Isi Etute	3.0
(France) Stella Kessler	3.0
(Hungary) Eszter Ratkai	2.7
(Finland) Erika Mace	2.6
(Serbia) Jovana Popovic	2.6
(Spain) Iyana Martín Carrión	2.6

Efficiency

Name	EFFPG
(Spain) Awa Fam	24.9
(Portugal) Clara Silva	22.4
(Latvia) Anna Liepina	19.1
(Serbia) Jovana Popovic	18.7
(Croatia) Petra Bozan	18.6

==== Teams ====
Points

Team	PPG
France	85.9
Spain	78.6
Italy	68.7
Finland	68.6
Portugal	68.3

Rebounds

Team	RPG
Finland	49.7
Germany	47.1
France	45.6
Italy	43.6
Poland	43.0
Turkey	43.0

Assists

Team	APG
France	21.6
Spain	20.7
Portugal	18.9
Latvia	16.1
Hungary	16.0

Blocks

Team	BPG
Germany	4.9
Spain	4.9
Portugal	4.7
Hungary	4.6
France	4.3

Steals

Team	SPG
France	17.0
Italy	16.9
Spain	13.4
Luxembourg	12.4
Finland	11.6

Efficiency

Team	EFFPG
France	112.4
Spain	100.6
Portugal	82.4
Italy	75.1
Croatia	66.9

=== Awards ===
The awards were announced on 11 August 2024.

Award	Player
All-Tournament Team	(France) Nell Angloma
All-Tournament Team	(Spain) Awa Fam
All-Tournament Team	(Israel) Gal Raviv
All-Tournament Team	(Portugal) Clara Silva
All-Tournament Team	(Serbia) Jovana Popovic
Most Valuable Player	(France) Nell Angloma
