= Erika Mace =

Finnish basketball player (born 2007)

Erika Macé
No. 17 – San Jose State Spartans
- Position: Guard
- League: NCAA

Personal information
- Born: 31 July 2007 (age 19) Espoo, Finland
- Listed height: 5 ft 9 in (1.75 m)

Career information
- College: San Jose State (2026–present)

Erika Macé (born 31 July 2007) is a Finnish basketball player. She is 177 cm tall and plays as a guard. She plays for the San Jose State Spartans, and formerly in the Korisliiga for the Espoo Basket Team (EBT).

Born in Espoo to a Finnish mother and a French father, Macé is a product of Espoo Basket Team's youth system. She won the Finnish under-16 championship in the 2021-2022 season, the under-17 championship in 2022-2023, and the under-19 championship in 2023-2024.

Macé first played in the Korisliiga with EBT's senior team in the 2022-2023 season, appearing in three games. In 2023-2024 she played in 22 regular season games, averaging more than 31.5 minutes per game. She averaged 12.3 points, 5.9 rebounds, and 4.6 assists per game. EBT did not reach the playoffs that season. Macé was named Rookie of the Year. In the 2024-2025 season, she was named the Korisliiga's Player of the Month for March.

Macé has played 16 games for the under-16 national team, nine for the under-17 national team, and 27 for the under-18 national team. In 2024 she played in the Under-17 World Cup, where Finland finished eighth. She has also played in the Under-16 European Championship in 2023 and the Under-18 European Championship in 2024. In 2025 she won silver at the Under-18 European Championship.

In 2026, she was recruited to play NCAA college basketball for the San Jose State Spartans.
