= Nina Bogićević =

Serbian basketball player

CTL Zaglebie Sosnowiec
- Position: Shooting guard
- League: Liga Femenina

Personal information
- Born: 10 January 1989 (age 37) Belgrade, SFR Yugoslavia
- Listed height: 1.81 m (5 ft 11 in)
- Listed weight: 65 kg (143 lb)

Career information
- WNBA draft: 2011: undrafted
- Playing career: 2008–present

Career history
- 2008–2009: Crvena zvezda
- 2009–2010: Girona
- 2010–2012: Toulouse Métropole
- 2012: Samsun
- 2012–2013: Crvena zvezda
- 2013: UTE
- 2013–2014: CB Conquero
- 2014–2015: Spišská Nová Ves
- 2015: Al-Qazeres
- 2015–2016: CREF
- 2016: Radivoje Korac
- 2016–present: CD Zamarat
- 2017-2020: Movistar Estudiantes
- 2019-2020: Besiktas
- 2020-2021: Poznan
- 2021-2022: Sosnowiec
Medals
Women's basketball
Representing Serbia
Mediterranean Games
Silver medal – second place	2009 Pescara	Team
European U20 Championship
Bronze medal – third place	2008 Italy	Team
World U19 Championship
Bronze medal – third place	2007 Slovakia	Team
European U18 Championship
Silver medal – second place	2006 Spain	Team
Gold medal – first place	2007 Serbia	Team
European U16 Championship
Silver medal – second place	2004 Italy	Team

Nina Bogićević (Serbian Cyrillic: Нина Богићевић; born 10 January 1989) is a Serbian women's basketball player. She learned to play basketball through the Red Star Belgrade youth academy, and in her career played extensively throughout European leagues in France, Turkey, Spain, Slovakia, and Italy. For the 2025 season, she signed with the Chilean team Colegio Los Leones Quilpe.
