= Slovenia women's national under-18 basketball team =

National basketball team of Slovenia

Slovenia
- FIBA zone: FIBA Europe
- National federation: Basketball Federation of Slovenia

U19 World Cup
- Appearances: 1
- Medals: None

U18 EuroBasket
- Appearances: 13
- Medals: (gold) Gold: 1 (2023)

U18 EuroBasket Division B
- Appearances: 5
- Medals: (gold) Gold: 1 (2022); (silver) Silver: 1 (2009); (bronze) Bronze: 1 (2008)

The Slovenia women's national under-18 and under-19 basketball team is a national basketball team of Slovenia, administered by the Basketball Federation of Slovenia. It represents the country in under-18 and under-19 women's international basketball competitions.

== FIBA U18 Women's EuroBasket participations ==
Year	Division A	Division B
2002	10th	
2007		7th
2008		3rd place, bronze medalist(s)
2009		2nd place, silver medalist(s)
2010	4th	
2011	11th	
2012	12th	
2013	12th	
2014	10th	

Year	Division A	Division B
2015	5th	
2016	10th	
2017	7th	
2018	16th	
2019		11th
2022		1st place, gold medalist(s)
2023	1st place, gold medalist(s)	
2024	13th	
2025	12th	

== FIBA Under-19 Women's Basketball World Cup participations ==
Year	Result
2011	14th

== See also ==
- Slovenia women's national basketball team
- Slovenia women's national under-16 basketball team
- Slovenia men's national under-18 basketball team
