= 2023 FIBA U18 Women's European Championship =

Basketball championship

Tournament details
- Host country: Turkey
- City: Konya
- Dates: 1–9 July 2023
- Teams: 16 (from 1 confederation)
- Venues: 2 (in 1 host city)

Final positions
- Champions: Slovenia (1st title)
- Runners-up: France
- Third place: Spain

Tournament statistics
- MVP: (Slovenia) Ajša Sivka

Official website
- www.fiba.basketball

The 2023 FIBA U18 Women's European Championship was the 38th edition of the European basketball championship for women's national under-18 teams. It was played from 1 to 9 July 2023 in Konya, Turkey. Slovenia won the tournament and became the European champions for the first time after beating France 63–61 in the final.

== Participating teams ==
- Belgium
- Czech Republic
- Finland
- France
- Germany
- Hungary
- Israel
- Italy
- Latvia
- Lithuania
- Poland
- Portugal ▲ (Runners-up, 2022 FIBA U18 Women's European Championship Division B)
- Serbia ▲ (Third place, 2022 FIBA U18 Women's European Championship Division B)
- Slovenia ▲ (Winners, 2022 FIBA U18 Women's European Championship Division B)
- Spain
- Turkey

== First round ==
The draw of the first round was held on 14 February 2023 in Freising, Germany.

In the first round, the teams were drawn into four groups of four. All teams advance to the playoffs.

All times are local (Turkey Time – UTC+3).

=== Group A ===
Pos	Team	Pld	W	L	PF	PA	PD	Pts
1	Portugal	3	3	0	211	157	+54	6
2	Belgium	3	2	1	196	155	+41	5
3	Italy	3	1	2	167	199	−32	4
4	Lithuania	3	0	3	154	217	−63	3

Source: FIBA

1 July 2023
14:00

Boxscore

Lithuania	62–64	Italy
Scoring by quarter: 10–19, 19–21, 19–17, 14–7

Konya Sports Complex II

1 July 2023
16:30

Boxscore

Portugal	66–51	Belgium
Scoring by quarter: 9–15, 18–14, 23–12, 16–10

Konya Sports Complex II

2 July 2023
14:00

Boxscore

Belgium	83–45	Lithuania
Scoring by quarter: 26–6, 11–15, 20–17, 26–7

Konya Sports Complex

2 July 2023
21:30

Boxscore

Italy	59–75	Portugal
Scoring by quarter: 17–19, 10–28, 18–15, 14–13

Konya Sports Complex II

3 July 2023
16:30

Boxscore

Belgium	62–44	Italy
Scoring by quarter: 14–12, 13–14, 15–8, 20–10

Konya Sports Complex

3 July 2023
21:30

Boxscore

Lithuania	47–70	Portugal
Scoring by quarter: 13–23, 18–15, 7–11, 9–21

Konya Sports Complex

=== Group B ===
Pos	Team	Pld	W	L	PF	PA	PD	Pts
1	France	3	3	0	216	142	+74	6
2	Hungary	3	2	1	187	149	+38	5
3	Turkey (H)	3	1	2	162	180	−18	4
4	Poland	3	0	3	145	239	−94	3

Source: FIBA
(H) Hosts

1 July 2023
19:00

Boxscore

Turkey	71–47	Poland
Scoring by quarter: 6–14, 28–10, 19–12, 18–11

Konya Sports Complex

1 July 2023
21:30

Boxscore

Hungary	41–61	France
Scoring by quarter: 12–19, 9–15, 11–14, 9–13

Konya Sports Complex

2 July 2023
19:00

Boxscore

France	66–43	Turkey
Scoring by quarter: 11–9, 19–14, 18–7, 18–13

Konya Sports Complex

2 July 2023
19:00

Boxscore

Poland	40–79	Hungary
Scoring by quarter: 14–25, 15–19, 3–16, 8–19

Konya Sports Complex II

3 July 2023
14:00

Boxscore

Poland	58–89	France
Scoring by quarter: 13–17, 13–18, 20–20, 12–34

Konya Sports Complex II

3 July 2023
19:00

Boxscore

Hungary	67–48	Turkey
Scoring by quarter: 14–16, 18–11, 18–14, 17–7

Konya Sports Complex

=== Group C ===
Pos	Team	Pld	W	L	PF	PA	PD	Pts
1	Spain	3	3	0	263	184	+79	6
2	Serbia	3	2	1	242	196	+46	5
3	Latvia	3	1	2	177	230	−53	4
4	Israel	3	0	3	157	229	−72	3

Source: FIBA

1 July 2023
14:00

Boxscore

Latvia	50–78	Spain
Scoring by quarter: 15–29, 14–19, 11–14, 10–16

Konya Sports Complex

1 July 2023
16:30

Boxscore

Serbia	66–47	Israel
Scoring by quarter: 16–16, 14–14, 14–4, 22–13

Konya Sports Complex

2 July 2023
14:00

Boxscore

Israel	62–73	Latvia
Scoring by quarter: 17–23, 14–22, 10–12, 21–16

Konya Sports Complex II

2 July 2023
16:30

Boxscore

Spain	95–86	Serbia
Scoring by quarter: 21–26, 24–23, 23–26, 27–11

Konya Sports Complex II

3 July 2023
14:00

Boxscore

Israel	48–90	Spain
Scoring by quarter: 15–25, 15–30, 12–16, 6–19

Konya Sports Complex

3 July 2023
21:30

Boxscore

Latvia	54–90	Serbia
Scoring by quarter: 12–20, 19–19, 12–25, 11–26

Konya Sports Complex II

=== Group D ===
Pos	Team	Pld	W	L	PF	PA	PD	Pts
1	Slovenia	3	3	0	221	175	+46	6
2	Germany	3	2	1	202	193	+9	5
3	Finland	3	1	2	196	205	−9	4
4	Czech Republic	3	0	3	205	251	−46	3

Source: FIBA

1 July 2023
19:00

Boxscore

Czech Republic	76–89	Germany
Scoring by quarter: 18–29, 21–15, 14–25, 23–20

Konya Sports Complex II

1 July 2023
21:30

Boxscore

Slovenia	84–54	Finland
Scoring by quarter: 19–19, 32–9, 16–11, 17–15

Konya Sports Complex II

2 July 2023
16:30

Boxscore

Finland	84–62	Czech Republic
Scoring by quarter: 16–22, 25–11, 19–14, 24–15

Konya Sports Complex

2 July 2023
21:30

Boxscore

Germany	54–59	Slovenia
Scoring by quarter: 17–10, 16–18, 14–23, 7–8

Konya Sports Complex

3 July 2023
16:30

Boxscore

Czech Republic	67–78	Slovenia
Scoring by quarter: 17–25, 23–18, 13–11, 14–24

Konya Sports Complex II

3 July 2023
19:00

Boxscore

Finland	58–59	Germany
Scoring by quarter: 19–17, 17–12, 8–17, 14–13

Konya Sports Complex II

== Playoff brackets ==
=== Main bracket ===
Round of 16
5 July
A1 Portugal	63
B4 Poland	81
5 July
C2 Serbia	70
D3 Finland	64
5 July
B2 Hungary	59
A3 Italy	53
5 July
D1 Slovenia	84
C4 Israel	63
5 July
A2 Belgium	59
B3 Turkey	62
5 July
C1 Spain	83
D4 Czech Republic	57
5 July
B1 France	76
A4 Lithuania	36
5 July
D2 Germany	59
C3 Latvia	72

Quarterfinals
6 July
Poland	65
Serbia	75
6 July
Hungary	60
Slovenia	76
6 July
Turkey	64
Spain	78
6 July
France	81
Latvia	36

Semifinals
8 July
Serbia	65
Slovenia	89
8 July
Spain	49
France	82

Final
9 July
Slovenia	63
France	61
3rd place match
9 July
Serbia	52
Spain	80

=== 5th place bracket ===
5th–8th place semifinals
8 July
Poland	40
Hungary	74
8 July
Turkey	65
Latvia	51

5th place match
9 July
Hungary	57
Turkey	44
7th place match
9 July
Poland	79
Latvia	56

=== 9th place bracket ===
9th–16th place quarterfinals
6 July
Portugal	77
Finland	89
6 July
Italy	62
Israel	65
6 July
Belgium	66
Czech Republic	43
6 July
Lithuania	72
Germany	73

9th–12th place semifinals
8 July
Finland	81
Israel	76
8 July
Belgium	61
Germany	57

9th place match
9 July
Finland	54
Belgium	80
11th place match
9 July
Israel	63
Germany	79

=== 13th place bracket ===
13th–16th place semifinals
8 July
Portugal	44
Italy	45
8 July
Czech Republic	56
Lithuania	51

13th place match
9 July
Italy	68
Czech Republic	63
15th place match
9 July
Portugal	54
Lithuania	43

== Playoff results ==
=== Round of 16 ===
5 July 2023
14:00

Boxscore

Hungary	59–53	Italy
Scoring by quarter: 11–14, 13–22, 12–8, 23–9

Konya Sports Complex

5 July 2023
14:00

Boxscore

Spain	83–57	Czech Republic
Scoring by quarter: 27–14, 21–16, 24–16, 11–11

Konya Sports Complex II

5 July 2023
16:30

Boxscore

France	76–36	Lithuania
Scoring by quarter: 22–8, 10–11, 21–11, 23–6

Konya Sports Complex

5 July 2023
16:30

Boxscore

Slovenia	84–63	Israel
Scoring by quarter: 17–14, 24–19, 26–15, 17–15

Konya Sports Complex II

5 July 2023
19:00

Boxscore

Belgium	59–62	Turkey
Scoring by quarter: 23–13, 19–12, 10–18, 7–19

Konya Sports Complex

5 July 2023
19:00

Boxscore

Serbia	70–64	Finland
Scoring by quarter: 16–14, 7–15, 19–21, 28–14

Konya Sports Complex II

5 July 2023
21:30

Boxscore

Portugal	63–81	Poland
Scoring by quarter: 16–27, 16–22, 17–12, 14–20

Konya Sports Complex

5 July 2023
21:30

Boxscore

Germany	59–72	Latvia
Scoring by quarter: 21–11, 10–20, 17–13, 11–28

Konya Sports Complex II

=== 9th–16th place quarterfinals ===
6 July 2023
14:00

Boxscore

Italy	62–65	Israel
Scoring by quarter: 17–16, 21–21, 9–17, 15–11

Konya Sports Complex II

6 July 2023
16:30

Boxscore

Portugal	77–89	Finland
Scoring by quarter: 21–21, 22–22, 20–18, 14–28

Konya Sports Complex II

6 July 2023
19:00

Boxscore

Belgium	66–43	Czech Republic
Scoring by quarter: 13–11, 15–3, 21–13, 17–13

Konya Sports Complex II

6 July 2023
21:30

Boxscore

Lithuania	72–73	Germany
Scoring by quarter: 19–24, 13–15, 24–21, 16–13

Konya Sports Complex II

=== 13th–16th place semifinals ===
8 July 2023
14:00

Boxscore

Portugal	44–45	Italy
Scoring by quarter: 16–6, 11–10, 5–16, 12–13

Konya Sports Complex II

8 July 2023
16:30

Boxscore

Czech Republic	56–51	Lithuania
Scoring by quarter: 11–9, 17–20, 15–13, 13–9

Konya Sports Complex II

=== 15th place match ===
9 July 2023
13:00

Portugal	54–43	Lithuania
Scoring by quarter: 13–10, 16–17, 14–6, 11–10

Konya Sports Complex II

=== 13th place match ===
9 July 2023
16:30

Boxscore

Italy	68–63	Czech Republic
Scoring by quarter: 20–11, 17–18, 17–14, 14–20

Konya Sports Complex

=== 9th–12th place semifinals ===
8 July 2023
19:00

Boxscore

Finland	81–76	Israel
Scoring by quarter: 21–17, 19–24, 15–11, 26–24

Konya Sports Complex II

8 July 2023
21:30

Boxscore

Belgium	61–57	Germany
Scoring by quarter: 15–12, 13–20, 17–16, 16–9

Konya Sports Complex II

=== 11th place match ===
9 July 2023
15:30

Boxscore

Israel	63–79	Germany
Scoring by quarter: 19–15, 18–20, 16–17, 10–27

Konya Sports Complex II

=== 9th place match ===
9 July 2023
18:00

Boxscore

Finland	54–80	Belgium
Scoring by quarter: 10–20, 12–23, 18–19, 14–18

Konya Sports Complex II

=== Championship quarterfinals ===
6 July 2023
14:00

Boxscore

Poland	65–75	Serbia
Scoring by quarter: 25–21, 13–21, 9–10, 18–23

Konya Sports Complex

6 July 2023
16:30

Boxscore

Hungary	60–76	Slovenia
Scoring by quarter: 7–20, 9–25, 22–17, 22–14

Konya Sports Complex

6 July 2023
19:00

Boxscore

Turkey	64–78	Spain
Scoring by quarter: 15–26, 18–20, 17–19, 14–13

Konya Sports Complex

6 July 2023
21:30

Boxscore

France	81–36	Latvia
Scoring by quarter: 22–13, 19–13, 24–8, 16–2

Konya Sports Complex

=== 5th–8th place semifinals ===
8 July 2023
14:00

Boxscore

Poland	40–74	Hungary
Scoring by quarter: 6–20, 10–19, 18–19, 6–16

Konya Sports Complex

8 July 2023
16:30

Boxscore

Turkey	65–51	Latvia
Scoring by quarter: 18–8, 16–12, 17–16, 14–15

Konya Sports Complex

=== 7th place match ===
9 July 2023
14:00

Boxscore

Poland	79–56	Latvia
Scoring by quarter: 22–9, 21–8, 21–23, 15–16

Konya Sports Complex II

=== 5th place match ===
9 July 2023
20:30

Boxscore

Hungary	57–44	Turkey
Scoring by quarter: 11–19, 16–6, 13–10, 17–9

Konya Sports Complex

=== Championship semifinals ===
8 July 2023
19:00

Boxscore

Serbia	65–89	Slovenia
Scoring by quarter: 16–23, 18–20, 22–23, 9–23

Konya Sports Complex

8 July 2023
21:30

Boxscore

Spain	49–82	France
Scoring by quarter: 11–20, 13–11, 14–20, 11–31

Konya Sports Complex

=== 3rd place match ===
9 July 2023
19:00

Boxscore

Serbia	52–80	Spain
Scoring by quarter: 15–23, 13–16, 9–14, 15–27

Konya Sports Complex

=== Final ===
9 July 2023
21:30

Boxscore

Slovenia	63–61	France
Scoring by quarter: 23–14, 12–20, 15–15, 13–12

Konya Sports Complex

== Final standings ==
Rank	Team	Record
1st place, gold medalist(s)	Slovenia	7–0
2nd place, silver medalist(s)	France	6–1
3rd place, bronze medalist(s)	Spain	6–1
4	Serbia	4–3
5	Hungary	5–2
6	Turkey	3–4
7	Poland	2–5
8	Latvia	2–5
9	Belgium	5–2
10	Finland	3–4
11	Germany	4–3
12	Israel	1–6
13	Italy	3–4
14	Czech Republic	1–6
15	Portugal	4–3
16	Lithuania	0–7

Relegated to the 2024 FIBA U18 Women's EuroBasket Division B

== See also ==
- 2023 FIBA U18 Women's European Championship Division B
