= Belgium women's national under-18 and under-19 basketball team =

Belgium
- FIBA zone: FIBA Europe
- National federation: Basketball Belgium

U19 World Cup
- Appearances: 3
- Medals: None

U18 EuroBasket
- Appearances: 23
- Medals: (gold) Gold: 2 (2011, 2017)

U18 EuroBasket Division B
- Appearances: 3
- Medals: (silver) Silver: 2 (2008, 2013)
| Home | Away |

The Belgium women's national under-18 and under-19 basketball team is a national basketball team of Belgium, administered by the Basketball Belgium. It represents the country in under-18 and under-19 women's international basketball competitions.

== FIBA U18 Women's EuroBasket participations ==
| Year | Division A | Division B |
|---|---|---|
| 1967 | 12th | |
| 1971 | 9th | |
| 1973 | 12th | |
| 1979 | 12th | |
| 1983 | 12th | |
| 1988 | 7th | |
| 1994 | 11th | |
| 2005 | 11th | |
| 2006 | 15th | |
| 2007 | | 10th |
| 2008 | | 2nd place, silver medalist(s) |
| 2009 | 11th | |
| 2010 | 13th | |

| Year | Division A | Division B |
|---|---|---|
| 2011 | 1st place, gold medalist(s) | |
| 2012 | 15th | |
| 2013 | | 2nd place, silver medalist(s) |
| 2014 | 5th | |
| 2015 | 7th | |
| 2016 | 6th | |
| 2017 | 1st place, gold medalist(s) | |
| 2018 | 5th | |
| 2019 | 12th | |
| 2022 | 12th | |
| 2023 | 9th | |
| 2024 | 7th | |
| 2025 | 4th | |

== FIBA Under-19 Women's Basketball World Cup participations ==
| Year | Result |
|---|---|
| 2015 | 6th |
| 2019 | 4th |
| 2027 | Qualified |

== See also ==
- Belgium women's national basketball team
- Belgium women's national under-17 basketball team
- Belgium men's national under-19 basketball team
