= EuroBasket Women 2027 qualification =

The EuroBasket Women 2027 qualification will be played from November 2025 to February 2027 to decide the 12 national teams that will join the co-hosts Belgium, Finland, Sweden and Lithuania in the final tournament. The qualifying competition will feature a total of 38 teams, including four co-hosts, which are placed in the same group.

== Format ==
The qualification will be played under a new format; there will be two rounds:

- First round

27 teams entered the first round. They were drawn into six groups of four and one group of three. Each group will be played as a double round-robin tournament. The top two teams from each group and the best three third-placed teams will advance to the second round.

- Second round

The 17 teams advancing from the first round will be joined by seven teams participating in the 2026 FIBA Women's Basketball World Cup Qualifying Tournaments. The teams will be split into six groups of four, with the top two teams from each group qualifying for the final tournament.

== First round ==
Matches were played from 12 to 18 November 2025, and from 11 to 17 March 2026, with three match days per window.

=== Draw ===
The draw took place on 23 July 2025.

==== Seeding ====
Seedings were announced on 17 July 2025.

Pot 1
Team	Pos
Serbia	8
Montenegro	19
Great Britain	20
Greece	21
Slovenia	22
Bosnia and Herzegovina	23
Slovakia	28

Pot 2
Team	Pos
Latvia	29
Croatia	33
Ukraine	35
Portugal	40
Poland	43
Israel	47
Switzerland	49

Pot 3
Team	Pos
Luxembourg	50
Netherlands	51
Denmark	55
Bulgaria	58
Romania	60
Iceland	62
Norway	67

Pot 4
Team	Pos
Estonia	69
North Macedonia	74
Cyprus	78
Austria	80
Ireland	81
Azerbaijan	103

=== Groups ===
==== Group A ====
Pos	Team	Pld	W	L	PF	PA	PD	Pts	Qualification
1	Israel	6	6	0	528	419	+109	12	Second round
2	Luxembourg	6	3	3	419	399	+20	9	Second round
3	Ireland	6	2	4	441	482	−41	8	
4	Bosnia and Herzegovina	6	1	5	427	515	−88	7	

Source: FIBA
Rules for classification: 1) Points; 2) Head-to-head; 3) Points difference; 4) Points scored.

12 November 2025	Ireland	53–69	Luxembourg	Dublin
17:00	Scoring by quarter: 11–21, 10–16, 5–15, 27–17
	Pts: Finn 10; Rebs: Melia 10; Asts: Maguire 6	Boxscore	Pts: Simon 14; Rebs: Madjo, Etute 10; Asts: three players 3	Arena: National Basketball Arena; Attendance: 750; Referees: Sonia Teixeria (POR), Sandra Sánchez (ESP), Sara Månsson (SWE)

12 November 2025	Bosnia and Herzegovina	91–98	Israel	Sarajevo
18:00	Scoring by quarter: 26–19, 27–25, 21–27, 17–27
	Pts: Domuzin 25; Rebs: Smalls 12; Asts: Domuzin 7	Boxscore	Pts: Baron 27; Rebs: Raber 16; Asts: Raber 7	Arena: Juan Antonio Samaranch Olympic Hall; Referees: Çisil Güngör (TUR), Nikolaos Tziopanos (GRE), Petr Blahout (CZE)

15 November 2025	Israel	77–65	Luxembourg	Riga, Latvia (Note: Due to the Gaza war, the Israelian team plays their home matches at neutral venues.)
21:00	Scoring by quarter: 19–21, 24–14, 16–20, 18–10
	Pts: Raber 21; Rebs: Raber 10; Asts: three players 5	Boxscore	Pts: Simon 18; Rebs: Etute 8 Asts: Simon 7	Arena: Latvian Team Sports Hall; Attendance: 10; Referees: Amal Dahra (FRA), Juozas Barkauskas (LTU), Rainis Värv (EST)

15 November 2025	Ireland	94–67	Bosnia and Herzegovina	Dublin
19:25	Scoring by quarter: 27–15, 13–21, 29–15, 25–16
	Pts: Finn 16; Rebs: Scanlon 15; Asts: Melia 8	Boxscore	Pts: Smalls 24; Rebs: Smalls 12; Asts: Domuzin 7	Arena: National Basketball Arena; Attendance: 1,250; Referees: Edgard Ceccarelli (FRA), Tijmen Last (NED), Martin Van Hoye (BEL)

18 November 2025	Luxembourg	75–39	Bosnia and Herzegovina	Luxembourg City
19:00	Scoring by quarter: 23–11, 23–12, 10–6, 19–10
	Pts: Meynadier 18; Rebs: Etute 14; Asts: Simon 7	Boxscore	Pts: Smalls 17; Rebs: Guska, Smalls 7 Asts: Domuzin 3	Arena: d'Coque; Attendance: 1,200; Referees: Yasmina Alcaraz (ESP), Chess Van Looy (BEL), Maria Ignatiou (CYP)

18 November 2025	Israel	93–86(OT)	Ireland	Riga, Latvia
20:00	Scoring by quarter: 21–23, 16–15, 21–18, 19–21, Overtime: 16–9
	Pts: Raber 26; Rebs: Meyers, Raber 11; Asts: Dahan Sujic 8	Boxscore	Pts: Hickey 17; Rebs: Hickey 9 Asts: Finn, Thornton 7	Arena: Latvian Team Sports Hall; Attendance: 20; Referees: Viola Györgyi (ROU), Einārs Tukišs (LAT), Nikola Bejat (NOR)

11 March 2026	Israel	94–71	Bosnia and Herzegovina	Riga, Latvia
15:30	Scoring by quarter: 25–17, 17–20, 25–21, 27–13
	Pts: Dahan Sujic 20; Rebs: Raber 13; Asts: Raber, Saar 7	Boxscore	Pts: Guska 20; Rebs: Smalls 10; Asts: Smalls 9	Arena: Rimi Olympic Centre; Referees: Alin Faur (ROU), Sandra Sánchez (ESP), Kyriacos Christou (CYP)

11 March 2026	Luxembourg	85–73	Ireland	Luxembourg City
19:00	Scoring by quarter: 22–17, 23–16, 23–23, 17–17
	Pts: Etute 27; Rebs: Etute 19; Asts: Meynadier 6	Boxscore	Pts: Rafferty 17; Rebs: Rafferty 8 Asts: Maguire, Thornton 5	Arena: d'Coque; Attendance: 850; Referees: Özlem Yalman (TUR), Laure Coanus (FRA), Diana Lapanović (SLO)

14 March 2026	Luxembourg	52–76	Israel	Luxembourg City
18:00	Scoring by quarter: 14–18, 15–24, 13–21, 10–13
	Pts: Madjo 13; Rebs: Madjo 10; Asts: Meynadier 6	Boxscore	Pts: Baron 14; Rebs: Raber 8 Asts: Meyers 5	Arena: d'Coque; Attendance: 1 Referees: Sonia Teixeria (POR), Jelena Tomić (CRO), Maria Ignatiou (CYP)

14 March 2026	Bosnia and Herzegovina	78–81	Ireland	Zenica
20:00	Scoring by quarter: 17–17, 30–24, 19–18, 12–22
	Pts: Smalls 27; Rebs: Smalls 15; Asts: Smalls 7	Boxscore	Pts: Finn 21; Rebs: Rafferty 10; Asts: Finn 4	Arena: Arena Zenica; Attendance: 500; Referees: Zoran Mitrovski (MKD), Mladen Lučić (MNE), Vlad-Theodor Cotrobas-Dascalu (ROU)

17 March 2026	Ireland	54–90	Israel	Riga, Latvia
18:30	Scoring by quarter: 8–29, 13–19, 15–27, 18–15
	Pts: Hickey 18; Rebs: Hickey 8 Asts: Thornton 3	Boxscore	Pts: Dahan Sujic 20; Rebs: Raber 7 Asts: Raber 11	Arena: Latvian Team Sports Hall; Referees: Sergii Zashchuk (UKR), Jānis Rozenbergs (LAT), Hendrik Laas (EST)

17 March 2026	Bosnia and Herzegovina	81–73(OT)	Luxembourg	Zenica
20:00	Scoring by quarter: 16–24, 21–12, 20-19, 12–14, Overtime: 12-4
	Pts: Smalls 26; Rebs: Smalls 13; Asts: Smalls 5	Boxscore	Pts: Meynadier 16; Rebs: Etute 12; Asts: Simon 5	Arena: Arena Zenica; Attendance: 750; Referees: Jan Baloun (CZE), Rúben Györfy (HUN), Martin Demierre (SUI)

==== Group B ====
Pos	Team	Pld	W	L	PF	PA	PD	Pts	Qualification
1	Latvia	6	5	1	478	378	+100	11	Second round
2	Slovenia	6	4	2	474	430	+44	10	Second round
3	Netherlands	6	3	3	471	466	+5	9	Second round
4	Estonia	6	0	6	372	521	−149	6	

Source: FIBA
Rules for classification: 1) Points; 2) Head-to-head; 3) Points difference; 4) Points scored.

12 November 2025	Estonia	54–92	Netherlands	Tallinn
19:00	Scoring by quarter: 19–23, 13–18, 20–25, 2–26
	Pts: Teder 12; Rebs: Lass 6 Asts: Kosareva, Teder 3	Boxscore	Pts: Hof 15; Rebs: Hof 6 Asts: Cornelius 6	Arena: Nord Sports Hall; Attendance: 407; Referees: Tomasz Łangowski (POL), Andžej Urbanovič (LTU), Jemina Vahakytta (FIN)

12 November 2025	Slovenia	77–66	Latvia	Ljubljana
18:00	Scoring by quarter: 12–19, 20–14, 22–19, 23–14
	Pts: Friskovec 22; Rebs: Debeljak 9 Asts: Lisec 5	Boxscore	Pts: Laksa 15; Rebs: Strautmane 10; Asts: Bulāne, Vilka 3	Arena: Kodeljevo Hall; Attendance: 550; Referees: Yasmina Alcaraz (ESP), Svetlana Stoyanova (BUL), Duhan Köyiçi (TUR)

15 November 2025	Estonia	65–87	Slovenia	Tallinn
17:00	Scoring by quarter: 17–33, 12–14, 16–17, 20–23
	Pts: Asi, Pokk 11; Rebs: Pokk 6 Asts: Asi 5	Boxscore	Pts: Lisec 22; Rebs: Lisec 7 Asts: Sivka 6	Arena: Nord Sports Hall; Attendance: 451; Referees: Esperanza Mendoza (ESP), Joona Haaja (FIN), Amalia Marchiș (ROU)

15 November 2025	Latvia	89–62	Netherlands	Riga
18:00	Scoring by quarter: 18–15, 25–15, 21–13, 25–19
	Pts: Vilka 18; Rebs: Šteinberga 8 Asts: Vihmane 5	Boxscore	Pts: Driessen 22; Rebs: Van Kruistum 7 Asts: Cornelius 5	Arena: Komandu sporta spēļu halle Attendance: 2,450; Referees: Sergii Zashchuk (UKR), Laure Coanus (FRA), Urfan Bayramli (AZE)

18 November 2025	Latvia	89–47	Estonia	Riga
17:00	Scoring by quarter: 21–16, 26–13, 26–6, 16–12
	Pts: Vilka 17; Rebs: Laksa 7 Asts: Vilka 5	Boxscore	Pts: Pokk 13; Rebs: Pokk 10; Asts: Asi 5	Arena: Komandu sporta spēļu halle Attendance: 2,305; Referees: Jelena Tomić (CRO), Romana Stojanović (SRB), Karol Kowalski (POL)

18 November 2025	Netherlands	86–76	Slovenia	Almere
19:30	Scoring by quarter: 21–19, 21–19, 25–13, 19–25
	Pts: Hof 29; Rebs: Hof 9 Asts: Cornelius 9	Boxscore	Pts: Friskovec, Lisec 20; Rebs: Turnšek 7 Asts: Oblak 6	Arena: Topsportcentrum; Attendance: 1,950; Referees: Sonia Teixeria (POR), Simon Unsworth (GBR), Sara Månsson (SWE)

11 March 2026	Latvia	79–53	Slovenia	Riga
19:00	Scoring by quarter: 20–21, 18–17, 27–7, 14–8
	Pts: Laksa 21; Rebs: P. Strautmane 10; Asts: Vihmane 6	Boxscore	Pts: Lisec 12; Rebs: Lisec 8 Asts: three players 3	Arena: Latvian Team Sports Hall; Attendance: 2,347; Referees: Łukasz Jankowski (POL), Gabrielius Simanavičius (LTU), Elias Anttonen (FIN)

11 March 2026	Netherlands	87–77	Estonia	Almere
19:30	Scoring by quarter: 15–20, 18–20, 30–21, 24–16
	Pts: Hof 23; Rebs: Hof 12; Asts: Hof 7	Boxscore	Pts: Pokk 19; Rebs: Lass 4 Asts: Teder 6	Arena: Topsportcentrum; Attendance: 1,211; Referees: Skirmantas Letukas (LTU), Kirsten Poffé (BEL), Nikola Perlić (CRO)

14 March 2026	Slovenia	84–54	Estonia	Ljubljana
16:30	Scoring by quarter: 15–9, 26–16, 27–19, 16–10
	Pts: Friskovec 26; Rebs: Friskovec 11; Asts: Friskovec 5	Boxscore	Pts: Asi 19; Rebs: Lass 6 Asts: Asi 5	Arena: Kodeljevo Hall; Attendance: 500; Referees: Özlem Yalman (TUR), Ewa Matuszewska (POL), László Goda (HUN)

14 March 2026	Netherlands	64–73	Latvia	Almere
19:30	Scoring by quarter: 19–16, 10–17, 15–21, 20–19
	Pts: Cornelius 16; Rebs: Hof 11; Asts: Westerik 5	Boxscore	Pts: Laksa 18; Rebs: Laksa 6 Asts: Laksa, Vilka 3	Arena: Topsportcentrum; Attendance: 1,731; Referees: Nikola Bejat (NOR), Bogna Podkowińska (POL), Josh Bowe (GBR)

17 March 2026	Slovenia	97–80	Netherlands	Ljubljana
18:00	Scoring by quarter: 20–28, 28–18, 25–14, 24–20
	Pts: Friskovec 20; Rebs: Shepard 9 Asts: Lisec 8	Boxscore	Pts: Westerik 17; Rebs: Hof 6 Asts: Cornelius, Hof 5	Arena: Kodeljevo Hall; Attendance: 550; Referees: Esperanza Mendoza (ESP), Viktor Nagy (HUN), Emma Perry (IRL)

17 March 2026	Estonia	75–82	Latvia	Tallinn
19:00	Scoring by quarter: 17–23, 13–20, 28–23, 17–16
	Pts: Asi 25; Rebs: Asi 7 Asts: Asi, Teder 5	Boxscore	Pts: Laksa 26; Rebs: Meldere 8 Asts: three players 3	Arena: Nord Sports Hall; Attendance: 613; Referees: Karol Kowalski (POL), Andžej Urbanovič (LTU), Denys Povorozniuk (UKR)

==== Group C ====
Pos	Team	Pld	W	L	PF	PA	PD	Pts	Qualification
1	Poland	6	6	0	472	301	+171	12	Second round
2	Slovakia	6	4	2	422	339	+83	10	Second round
3	Romania	6	2	4	352	450	−98	8	
4	Cyprus	6	0	6	325	481	−156	6	

Source: FIBA
Rules for classification: 1) Points; 2) Head-to-head; 3) Points difference; 4) Points scored.

12 November 2025	Cyprus	62–75	Romania	Limassol
19:00	Scoring by quarter: 14–20, 17–22, 10–11, 21–22
	Pts: Pangalos 17; Rebs: Akathiotou, Chenaklieva 5 Asts: Pangalos 5	Boxscore	Pts: Vîrjoghe 12; Rebs: Irimia 8 Asts: Cătinean 5	Arena: Spyros Kyprianou Athletic Center; Attendance: 350; Referees: Ivana Ivanović (SRB), Natalie Galuk (ISR), Veronika Vávrová (CZE)

12 November 2025	Slovakia	55–62	Poland	Bratislava
18:00	Scoring by quarter: 13–18, 7–17, 11–12, 24–15
	Pts: Páleníková 21; Rebs: Páleníková 9 Asts: Páleníková 3	Boxscore	Pts: Banaszak, Mavunga 15; Rebs: Mavunga 10; Asts: Wojtala 6	Arena: Gopass Arena; Attendance: 1,546; Referees: Jelena Tomić (CRO), Oleksandr Dotsenko (UKR), Silvia Jury (AUT)

15 November 2025	Poland	86–41	Romania	Sosnowiec
18:00	Scoring by quarter: 26–8, 13–7, 24–10, 23–16
	Pts: Borkowska 19; Rebs: Borkowska, Makurat 8 Asts: Wojtala 5	Boxscore	Pts: Armanu 11; Rebs: Vîrjoghe 6 Asts: Cătinean 6	Arena: Arena Sosnowiec; Attendance: 1,304; Referees: Roko Hordov (CRO), Oleksandr Oparin (UKR), Marija Ćirić (SRB)

15 November 2025	Cyprus	59–70	Slovakia	Limassol
19:00	Scoring by quarter: 19–12, 13–27, 17–11, 10–20
	Pts: Pangalos 18; Rebs: Pilakouta 13; Asts: Pilakouta 6	Boxscore	Pts: three players 17; Rebs: Moravčíková 10; Asts: Moravčíková 3	Arena: Spyros Kyprianou Athletic Center; Attendance: 450; Referees: Nataša Dragojević (MNE), Irene Frosolini (ITA), Ori Shalhavi (ISR)

18 November 2025	Romania	56–88	Slovakia	Ploiești
19:00	Scoring by quarter: 19–17, 10–21, 10–18, 17–32
	Pts: Armanu 13; Rebs: Vîrjoghe 10; Asts: Cătinean 3	Boxscore	Pts: Páleníková 16; Rebs: Mištinová 7 Asts: Lambert 6	Arena: Olimpia Sports Hall; Attendance: 700; Referees: Mladen Lučić (MNE), Suzana Vujičić (MNE), Alexandra Iurii (MDA)

18 November 2025	Poland	96–52	Cyprus	Sosnowiec
20:45	Scoring by quarter: 22–11, 25–18, 21–8, 28–15
	Pts: Rembiszewska 22; Rebs: Borkowska 8 Asts: Szymkiewicz 5	Boxscore	Pts: Pilakouta 17; Rebs: Chenaklieva, Pilakouta 5 Asts: Pangalos 7	Arena: Arena Sosnowiec; Attendance: 800; Referees: Indrė Balnionytė-Gecevičienė (LTU), Kristīne Simanoviča (LAT), Anastasiya Slozhenitsina (AZE)

11 March 2026	Poland	63–55	Slovakia	Koszalin
17:30	Scoring by quarter: 21–17, 11–9, 15–14, 16–15
	Pts: Mavunga 18; Rebs: Borkowska 11; Asts: Niemojewska 7	Boxscore	Pts: Páleníková 14; Rebs: Mištinová 8 Asts: four players 2	Arena: Hala Widowiskowo-Sportowa w Koszalinie; Attendance: 2,665; Referees: Sonia Teixeria (POR), Nikola Bejat (NOR), Milita Stalaučinskaitė (LTU)

11 March 2026	Romania	75–60	Cyprus	Sibiu
19:00	Scoring by quarter: 17–19, 25–2, 14–18, 19–21
	Pts: Cătinean 16; Rebs: three players 5 Asts: Ghizila 5	Boxscore	Pts: Pangalos 25; Rebs: Chenaklieva 8 Asts: three players 3	Arena: Sala Transilvania; Attendance: 1,738; Referees: Primož Pipan (SLO), Svetlana Stoyanova (BUL), Petr Blahout (CZE)

14 March 2026	Slovakia	75–44	Cyprus	Bratislava
17:00	Scoring by quarter: 24–13, 19–13, 19–12, 13–6
	Pts: Dudášová 16; Rebs: Mikulášiková 9 Asts: Páleníková 10	Boxscore	Pts: Pangalos 18; Rebs: Pangalos 8 Asts: Pangalos, Raca 2	Arena: Gopass Arena; Attendance: 1,238; Referees: Nermin Hodžić (GER), Diana Lapanović (SLO), Mia Maesano (CRO)

14 March 2026	Romania	50–75	Poland	Sibiu
19:00	Scoring by quarter: 17–19, 8–26, 11–9, 14–21
	Pts: Fota 22; Rebs: Nan 7 Asts: Cătinean, Manea 3	Boxscore	Pts: Gertchen 18; Rebs: Borkowska 11; Asts: Niemojewska 10	Arena: Sala Transilvania; Attendance: 1,560; Referees: Nemanja Ninković (SRB), Nikola Perlić (CRO), Balázs Mészáros (HUN)

17 March 2026	Slovakia	79–55	Romania	Bratislava
18:00	Scoring by quarter: 23–12, 15–14, 18–18, 23–11
	Pts: Dudášová 26; Rebs: Jakubcová, Martišková 9 Asts: Dudášová 8	Boxscore	Pts: Fota 13; Rebs: Vîrjoghe 16; Asts: Nan 4	Arena: Gopass Arena; Attendance: 1,319; Referees: Jelena Tomić (CRO), Laure Coanus (FRA), Polat Parlak (TUR)

17 March 2026	Cyprus	48–90	Poland	Limassol
19:00	Scoring by quarter: 15–27, 13–29, 11–20, 9–14
	Pts: Pangalos 14; Rebs: Chenaklieva, Kyprianou 4 Asts: Pangalos 6	Boxscore	Pts: Gertchen 17; Rebs: Burliga 9 Asts: Niemojewska, Wojtala 5	Arena: Spyros Kyprianou Athletic Center; Attendance: 412; Referees: Branimir Galić (CRO), Hristo Hristov (BUL), Silvia Jury (AUT)

==== Group D ====
Pos	Team	Pld	W	L	PF	PA	PD	Pts	Qualification
1	Great Britain	6	5	1	485	381	+104	11 (Note: Head-to-head points: Great Britain 3 (+8), Austria 3 (-8).)	Second round
2	Austria	6	5	1	476	410	+66	11	Second round
3	Switzerland	6	2	4	418	439	−21	8	
4	Norway	6	0	6	306	455	−149	6	

Source: FIBA
Rules for classification: 1) Points; 2) Head-to-head; 3) Points difference; 4) Points scored.
Notes:

12 November 2025	Austria	63–48	Norway	Vienna
18:00	Scoring by quarter: 13–10, 13–13, 19–18, 18–7
	Pts: Sagerer 23; Rebs: Allesch 11; Asts: Koizar 8	Boxscore	Pts: Austgulen 11; Rebs: Teigland 9 Asts: Teigland 5	Arena: Sport Arena Wien; Attendance: 1,900; Referees: Nataša Dragojević (MNE), Kirsten Poffé (BEL), Azra Musić (SLO)

12 November 2025	Great Britain	85–64	Switzerland	Manchester
19:00	Scoring by quarter: 12–22, 32–16, 28–18, 13–8
	Pts: Winterburn 26; Rebs: Fagbenle 8 Asts: Winterburn 7	Boxscore	Pts: Favre 19; Rebs: Schwarz 8 Asts: Herminjard 10	Arena: National Basketball Performance Centre; Referees: Branimir Galić (CRO), Amal Dahra (FRA), Indrė Balnionytė-Gecevičienė (LTU)

15 November 2025	Switzerland	71–33	Norway	Fribourg
17:30	Scoring by quarter: 21–8, 15–7, 10–8, 25–10
	Pts: Popovic 16; Rebs: Favre 7 Asts: Srdanovic 8	Boxscore	Pts: Myklebust 10; Rebs: Halvorsen, Holm 6 Asts: Teigland 3	Arena: Site Sportif Saint-Léonard; Attendance: 437; Referees: Özlem Yalman (TUR), Nermin Hodžić (GER), Hande Öztürk (TUR)

15 November 2025	Austria	85–81	Great Britain	Vienna
18:00	Scoring by quarter: 16–14, 20–23, 24–20, 25–24
	Pts: Höllerl 23; Rebs: Allesch 8 Asts: Koizar 6	Boxscore	Pts: Fagbenle 22; Rebs: Wilkinson 7 Asts: Winterburn 9	Arena: Sport Arena Wien; Referees: Silvia Marziali (ITA), Diana Lapanović (SLO), Kristīne Simanoviča (LAT)

18 November 2025	Norway	48–91	Great Britain	Bergen
18:00	Scoring by quarter: 16–26, 9–27, 10–15, 13–23
	Pts: Austgulen 18; Rebs: Holm 5 Asts: Austgulen 4	Boxscore	Pts: Wilkinson 20; Rebs: Brown, Wilkinson 4 Asts: Winterburn 8	Arena: Haukelandshallen; Attendance: 500; Referees: Elias Anttonen (FIN), Skirmantas Letukas (LTU), Nikolett Gruber (HUN)

18 November 2025	Switzerland	78–97	Austria	St. Gallen
19:00	Scoring by quarter: 12–23, 19–30, 27–19, 20–25
	Pts: Vilolo 15; Rebs: Schwarz 8 Asts: Fora 8	Boxscore	Pts: Allesch 26; Rebs: Allesch 15; Asts: Höllerl 8	Arena: Sportanlage Kreuzbleiche; Attendance: 900; Referees: Oleksandr Dotsenko (UKR), Emma Perry (IRL), Giacomo Dori (ITA)

11 March 2026	Norway	54–81	Austria	Bergen
18:00	Scoring by quarter: 13–23, 19–24, 8–17, 14–17
	Pts: Teigland 12; Rebs: Jacobsen, Sanford 5 Asts: Austgulen, Jacobsen 2	Boxscore	Pts: Koizar 20; Rebs: Allesch 9 Asts: Koizar 6	Arena: Haukelandshallen; Attendance: 287; Referees: Ewa Matuszewska (POL), Bjarki Thór Vidarsson (ISL), Indrė Balnionytė-Gecevičienė (LTU)

11 March 2026	Switzerland	58–77	Great Britain	Fribourg
19:00	Scoring by quarter: 12–23, 11–14, 23–18, 12–22
	Pts: Herminjard 18; Rebs: Schwarz 8 Asts: Schwarz 3	Boxscore	Pts: Anigwe 21; Rebs: Anigwe 13; Asts: Henderson 5	Arena: Site Sportif Saint-Leonard; Attendance: 387; Referees: Jelena Tomić (CRO), Jules Gaduel (FRA), Suzana Vujičić (MNE)

14 March 2026	Norway	68–81	Switzerland	Bergen
18:00	Scoring by quarter: 20–22, 14–21, 12–16, 22–22
	Pts: Myklebust 14; Rebs: Sanford 9 Asts: Sanford 7	Boxscore	Pts: Herminjard 25; Rebs: Schwarz 16; Asts: Herminjard, Hulliger 6	Arena: Haukelandshallen; Attendance: 364; Referees: Blaž Zupančič (SLO), Joona Haaja (FIN), Nikolett Gruber (HUN)

14 March 2026	Great Britain	83–71	Austria	Manchester
19:00	Scoring by quarter: 14–20, 21–16, 19–20, 29–15
	Pts: Winterburn 25; Rebs: Wilkinson 11; Asts: Winterburn 10	Boxscore	Pts: Höllerl 16; Rebs: Allesch 10; Asts: Kalaydjiev 5	Arena: National Basketball Performance Centre; Attendance: 737; Referees: Aurimas Borusas (LTU), Javier Torres (ESP), Sara Månsson (SWE)

17 March 2026	Austria	79–66	Switzerland	Vienna
19:15	Scoring by quarter: 20–20, 28–20, 18–13, 13–13
	Pts: Sagerer 20; Rebs: Sagerer 9 Asts: Kalaydjiev 8	Boxscore	Pts: Herminjard 19; Rebs: Schwarz 14; Asts: Ranisavljevic 6	Arena: Hallmann-Dome; Attendance: 1,500; Referees: Petr Hrůša (CZE), Skirmantas Letukas (LTU), Irene Frosolini (ITA)

17 March 2026	Great Britain	68–55	Norway	Manchester
19:00	Scoring by quarter: 10–16, 19–14, 16–12, 23–13
	Pts: Beckford-Norton 17; Rebs: Green 11; Asts: Winterburn 4	Boxscore	Pts: Sanford 13; Rebs: Teigland 5 Asts: Sanford 4	Arena: National Basketball Performance Centre; Attendance: 350; Referees: Armin Mutapcic (GER), Pierre Landy (FRA), Kirsten Poffé (BEL)

==== Group E ====
Pos	Team	Pld	W	L	PF	PA	PD	Pts	Qualification
1	Bulgaria	6	5	1	554	346	+208	11	Second round
2	Montenegro	6	4	2	474	361	+113	10	Second round
3	Ukraine	6	3	3	429	394	+35	9	Second round
4	Azerbaijan	6	0	6	274	630	−356	6	

Source: FIBA
Rules for classification: 1) Points; 2) Head-to-head; 3) Points difference; 4) Points scored.

12 November 2025	Azerbaijan	48–141	Bulgaria	Baku
15:00	Scoring by quarter: 15–30, 12–26, 12–48, 9–37
	Pts: Mollenhauer 15; Rebs: Akbingol 6 Asts: Shchukina 4	Boxscore	Pts: Georgieva 20; Rebs: Valcheva 9 Asts: Aleksieva, Konstantinova 8	Arena: Baku Sports Palace; Attendance: 457; Referees: Kirile Tvauri (GEO), Aikaterini Asimakaki (GRE), Milita Stalaučinskaitė (LTU)

12 November 2025	Montenegro	65–71	Ukraine	Podgorica
19:00	Scoring by quarter: 16–18, 18–15, 13–21, 18–17
	Pts: Leković 15; Rebs: Mack 12; Asts: Radonjić 5	Boxscore	Pts: Uro-Nilie 20; Rebs: Yurkevichus 15; Asts: Iagupova 11	Arena: Bemax Arena; Attendance: 400; Referees: Özlem Yalman (TUR), Viktor Nagy (HUN), Gilbert Hoxha (ALB)

15 November 2025	Azerbaijan	62–104	Montenegro	Baku
15:00	Scoring by quarter: 18–36, 16–25, 9–28, 19–15
	Pts: Mollenhauer 25; Rebs: Niftaliyeva 8 Asts: Shchukina 8	Boxscore	Pts: Savković 20; Rebs: Bigović 9 Asts: Savković 8	Arena: Baku Sports Palace; Attendance: 128; Referees: Polat Parlak (TUR), Mateusz Skorek (POL), Marina Shalamberidze (GEO)

15 November 2025	Ukraine	60–80	Bulgaria	Riga, Latvia (Note: Due to the Russian invasion of Ukraine, the Ukrainian team plays their home matches at neutral venues.)
18:30	Scoring by quarter: 16–30, 15–20, 10–14, 19–16
	Pts: Yurkevichus 14; Rebs: Yurkevichus 10; Asts: Iagupova 7	Boxscore	Pts: Hristova 22; Rebs: Hillsman 7 Asts: Hristova 6	Arena: Rimi Olympic Centre; Attendance: 250; Referees: Ritvars Helmšteins (LAT), Jānis Rozenbergs (LAT), Lynn Weiwers (LUX)

18 November 2025	Ukraine	98–34	Azerbaijan	Riga, Latvia
18:00	Scoring by quarter: 25–12, 20–8, 30–7, 23–7
	Pts: Panchuk 17; Rebs: Kononuchenko, Kulesha 8 Asts: Liashko 10	Boxscore	Pts: Gokcol 11; Rebs: Gokcol, Ramazanli 4 Asts: Akbarzade, Shchukina 2	Arena: Rimi Olympic Centre; Attendance: 250; Referees: Veronika Obertová (SVK), Gabrielius Simanavičius (LTU), Aurimas Borusas (LTU)

18 November 2025	Bulgaria	66–62	Montenegro	Botevgrad
19:00	Scoring by quarter: 18–21, 14–15, 20–14, 14–12
	Pts: Ivanova 15; Rebs: Dimitrova, Hillsman 7 Asts: Hillsman 5	Boxscore	Pts: Leković 15; Rebs: Mack 10; Asts: three players 3	Arena: Arena Botevgrad; Attendance: 1,100; Referees: Nikolaos Tziopanos (GRE), Veronika Vávrová (CZE), Bogna Podkowińska (POL)

11 March 2026	Ukraine	61–79	Montenegro	Riga, Latvia
19:00	Scoring by quarter: 21–28, 17–10, 15–18, 8–23
	Pts: Iagupova 31; Rebs: Yurkevichus 12; Asts: Sivakova 7	Boxscore	Pts: Leković 22; Rebs: Mack 8 Asts: Leković 9	Arena: Rimi Olympic Centre; Attendance: 270; Referees: Esperanza Mendoza (ESP), Tomasz Łangowski (POL), Kristīne Simanoviča (LAT)

11 March 2026	Bulgaria	120–40	Azerbaijan	Plovdiv
19:00	Scoring by quarter: 34–12, 24–12, 31–5, 31–10
	Pts: Koleva 20; Rebs: Koleva 11; Asts: Konstantinova 8	Boxscore	Pts: Shchukina 17; Rebs: Shchukina 7 Asts: Allahverdiyeva 3	Arena: Kolodruma; Attendance: 300; Referees: Romana Stojanović (SRB), Elldin Uglari (KOS), Eirini Tsantali (GRE)

14 March 2026	Montenegro	94–35	Azerbaijan	Bar
17:00	Scoring by quarter: 22–7, 20–8, 27–12, 25–8
	Pts: Šćepanović 21; Rebs: Bigović 13; Asts: Aksam 6	Boxscore	Pts: Shchukina 11; Rebs: Shchukina 12; Asts: Allahverdiyeva, Ramazanli 2	Arena: Topolica Sport Hall; Attendance: 511; Referees: Alija Ferevski (MKD), Gilbert Hoxha (ALB), Hasan Bajgorić (BIH)

14 March 2026	Bulgaria	81–66	Ukraine	Plovdiv
19:00	Scoring by quarter: 22–10, 26–22, 21–15, 12–19
	Pts: Hristova 24; Rebs: Hillsman 11; Asts: Dimitrova 6	Boxscore	Pts: Iagupova 24; Rebs: Uro-Nilie 10; Asts: Iagupova, Liashko 5	Arena: Kolodruma; Attendance: 1,000; Referees: Orhan Hekimoğlu (TUR), Emmouil Tsolakos (GRE), Amalia Marchiș (ROU)

17 March 2026	Azerbaijan	55–73	Ukraine	Baku
19:00	Scoring by quarter: 6–18, 17–21, 16–20, 16–14
	Pts: Shchukina 14; Rebs: Ramazanli 8 Asts: three players 3	Boxscore	Pts: Kulesha 13; Rebs: Kovtun 11; Asts: Yurkevichus 6	Arena: Baku Sports Palace; Attendance: 344; Referees: Rainis Värv (EST), Gabrielius Simanavičius (LTU), Luka Manojlović (SRB)

17 March 2026	Montenegro	70–66	Bulgaria	Bar
17:00	Scoring by quarter: 27–18, 16–14, 15–17, 12–17
	Pts: Leković 19; Rebs: Mack 11; Asts: Radonjić 5	Boxscore	Pts: Hillsman 23; Rebs: Hillsman 11; Asts: Konstantinova 4	Arena: Topolica Sport Hall; Attendance: 357; Referees: Özlem Yalman (TUR), Ilias Karpanos (GRE), Edison Gjoni (ALB)

==== Group F ====
Pos	Team	Pld	W	L	PF	PA	PD	Pts	Qualification
1	Croatia	6	4	2	486	424	+62	10 (Note: Croatia 174–146 Greece)	Second round
2	Greece	6	4	2	544	465	+79	10	Second round
3	Denmark	6	3	3	533	470	+63	9	Second round
4	North Macedonia	6	1	5	375	579	−204	7	

Source: FIBA
Rules for classification: 1) Points; 2) Head-to-head; 3) Points difference; 4) Points scored.
Notes:

12 November 2025	North Macedonia	79–78	Denmark	Skopje
18:00	Scoring by quarter: 18–21, 21–19, 19–18, 21–20
	Pts: Hempe 25; Rebs: Kmetovska 9 Asts: Mitrashinovikj 11	Boxscore	Pts: Formann 18; Rebs: Erikstrup 10; Asts: Formann 5	Arena: SRC Kale; Attendance: 350; Referees: Veronika Obertová (SVK), Alin Faur (ROU), Monika Mincheva (BUL)

12 November 2025	Greece	73–76	Croatia	Kozani
19:00	Scoring by quarter: 21–17, 19–19, 10–28, 23–12
	Pts: Fasoula 19; Rebs: Parks 7 Asts: Tsineke 7	Boxscore	Pts: Mühl 21; Rebs: Zellous 11; Asts: Mühl 7	Arena: Vasilis Flegkas Sports Hall; Attendance: 2,711; Referees: Esperanza Mendoza (ESP), Ritvars Helmšteins (LAT), Amalia Marchiș (ROU)

15 November 2025	Croatia	77–89	Denmark	Slavonski Brod
18:00	Scoring by quarter: 23–29, 19–13, 25–21, 10–26
	Pts: Begić, Erjavec 17; Rebs: Begić 13; Asts: Lazić 7	Boxscore	Pts: Okosun 28; Rebs: Okosun 19; Asts: Rimdal 6	Arena: Sports Hall Vijuš; Attendance: 1,000; Referees: Andrea Bongiorni (ITA), Ewa Matuszewska (POL), Duhan Köyiçi (TUR)

15 November 2025	North Macedonia	84–101	Greece	Skopje
18:00	Scoring by quarter: 23–23, 16–36, 20–22, 25–20
	Pts: Mitrashinovikj 23; Rebs: Mitrashinovikj 9 Asts: Mitrashinovikj 10	Boxscore	Pts: Christinaki 23; Rebs: Spanou 8 Asts: Tsineke 5	Arena: SRC Kale; Attendance: 1,000; Referees: Péter Praksch (HUN), Svetlana Stoyanova (BUL), Zdenko Tomašovič (SVK)

18 November 2025	Croatia	83–55	North Macedonia	Slavonski Brod
18:00	Scoring by quarter: 19–17, 25–15, 19–15, 20–8
	Pts: Begić, Cvitković 15; Rebs: Cvitković, Lazić 9 Asts: Erjavec, Tadić 8	Boxscore	Pts: Hempe, Mitrashinovikj 15; Rebs: Mitrashinovikj 8 Asts: Mitrashinovikj 8	Arena: Sports Hall Vijuš; Attendance: 1,200; Referees: Nataša Dragojević (MNE), Sandra Sánchez (ESP), Diana Lapanović (SLO)

18 November 2025	Denmark	83–97	Greece	Gentofte
18:30	Scoring by quarter: 24–27, 26–24, 21–21, 12–25
	Pts: Formann 24; Rebs: Okosun 11; Asts: Sandback 5	Boxscore	Pts: Fasoula 23; Rebs: Spanou 8 Asts: Pavlopoulou 7	Arena: Gentofte Sportspark; Attendance: 1,250; Referees: Ivana Ivanović (SRB), Milita Stalaučinskaitė (LTU), Gavin Williams (GBR)

11 March 2026	Denmark	125–57	North Macedonia	Gentofte
18:30	Scoring by quarter: 29–21, 27–12, 27–12, 42–12
	Pts: Rimdal 22; Rebs: Mortensen 12; Asts: Rimdal 7	Boxscore	Pts: Hempe 27; Rebs: Stojanovska 7 Asts: Selcova 5	Arena: Gentofte Sportspark; Attendance: 574; Referees: Sara Månsson (SWE), Irene Frosolini (ITA), Veronika Vávrová (CZE)

11 March 2026	Croatia	98–73	Greece	Sibenik
19:00	Scoring by quarter: 23–22, 26–16, 27–20, 22–15
	Pts: Dojkić 27; Rebs: Cvitković 7 Asts: Lazić 8	Boxscore	Pts: Fasoula 22; Rebs: Fasoula 14; Asts: Spanou 7	Arena: Dvorana Baldekin; Attendance: 900; Referees: Jan Baloun (CZE), Ciprian Stoica (ROU), Peter Ženiš (SVK)

14 March 2026	Greece	101–47	North Macedonia	Thessaloniki
15:30	Scoring by quarter: 29–7, 20–15, 28–5, 24–20
	Pts: Fasoula, Krimili 18; Rebs: Spanou 8 Asts: Tsineke 6	Boxscore	Pts: Hempe 21; Rebs: Hempe 8 Asts: Selcova 5	Arena: Ivanofeio Sports Arena; Attendance: 2,659; Referees: Esperanza Mendoza (ESP), Mikheil Vartanov (GEO), Edison Gjoni (ALB)

14 March 2026	Denmark	81–61	Croatia	Gentofte
15:00	Scoring by quarter: 22–15, 18–16, 26–16, 15–14
	Pts: Okosun 23; Rebs: Okosun 13; Asts: Formann, Rimdal 4	Boxscore	Pts: Lazić 18; Rebs: Begić 11; Asts: Lazić 4	Arena: Gentofte Sportspark; Attendance: 870; Referees: Łukasz Jankowski (POL), Valerio Grigioni (ITA), Tiago Roxo (POR)

17 March 2026	Greece	99–77	Denmark	Thessaloniki
18:00	Scoring by quarter: 34–20, 19–16, 20–23, 26–18
	Pts: Spanou 26; Rebs: Spanou 17; Asts: Tsineke 7	Boxscore	Pts: Okosun 19; Rebs: Okosun 8 Asts: Rimdal 5	Arena: Ivanofeio Sports Arena; Attendance: 2,501; Referees: Sonia Teixeria (POR), Primož Pipan (SLO), Sergej Ćetković (MNE)

17 March 2026	North Macedonia	53–91	Croatia	Skopje
18:00	Scoring by quarter: 6–21, 19–24, 11–24, 17–22
	Pts: Nikolikj 16; Rebs: Stojanovska 5 Asts: Nikolikj 5	Boxscore	Pts: Zellous 18; Rebs: Vukoša 10; Asts: Lazić 12	Arena: SRC Kale; Attendance: 400; Referees: Kirile Tvauri (GEO), Alin Faur (ROU), Duhan Köyiçi (TUR)

==== Group G ====
Pos	Team	Pld	W	L	PF	PA	PD	Pts	Qualification
1	Serbia	4	4	0	324	234	+90	8	Second round
2	Portugal	4	1	3	269	280	−11	5 (Note: Portugal 160–132 Iceland)	Second round
3	Iceland	4	1	3	257	336	−79	5	

Source: FIBA
Rules for classification: 1) Points; 2) Head-to-head; 3) Points difference; 4) Points scored.
Notes:

12 November 2025	Iceland	59–84	Serbia	Hafnarfjörður
19:30	Scoring by quarter: 14–26, 15–21, 9–25, 21–12
	Pts: Hinriksdóttir 18; Rebs: Sigurðardóttir 6 Asts: Steingrímsdóttir 5	Boxscore	Pts: Raca 18; Rebs: Nogić 6 Asts: Stanaćev 9	Arena: Ithrottamidstod Ásvellir; Attendance: 1,024; Referees: Viola Györgyi (ROU), Silvia Marziali (ITA), Ewa Matuszewska (POL)

15 November 2025	Serbia	77–51	Portugal	Belgrade
18:00	Scoring by quarter: 23–12, 13–19, 16–12, 25–8
	Pts: Janković, Stanković 14; Rebs: three players 5 Asts: Anderson 10	Boxscore	Pts: Da Silva 12; Rebs: Da Silva 6 Asts: three players 2	Arena: Ranko Žeravica Sports Hall; Attendance: 1,150; Referees: Ariadna Chueca (ESP), Çisil Güngör (TUR), Ioannis Agrafiotis (GRE)

18 November 2025	Portugal	100–70	Iceland	Barreiro
19:00	Scoring by quarter: 19–14, 36–12, 25–25, 20–19
	Pts: Gurreiro 16; Rebs: Da Silva 9 Asts: Correia, Rodrigues 4	Boxscore	Pts: Hinriksdóttir 19; Rebs: Sigurðardóttir 8 Asts: seven players 1	Arena: Pavilhão Municipal Luís de Carvalho; Attendance: 900; Referees: Esperanza Mendoza (ESP), Rea Car (BIH), Laure Coanus (FRA)

11 March 2026	Serbia	92–66	Iceland	Novi Sad
18:00	Scoring by quarter: 20–26, 20–14, 26–9, 26–17
	Pts: Raca 18; Rebs: Janković 9 Asts: three players 5	Boxscore	Pts: Rodriguez 13; Rebs: three players 4 Asts: Rodriguez 6	Arena: SPC Vojvodina; Attendance: 1,300; Referees: Viktor Nagy (HUN), Amalia Marchiș (ROU), Monika Mincheva (BUL)

14 March 2026	Portugal	58–71	Serbia	Almancil
19:00	Scoring by quarter: 12–22, 21–17, 11–18, 14–14
	Pts: Filipe 10; Rebs: Da Silva 8 Asts: Soeiro 4	Boxscore	Pts: Nogić 18; Rebs: Turudić 9 Asts: Stanaćev 3	Arena: Pavilhao Multiusos 25 de Abril; Attendance: 769; Referees: Valentin Oliot (FRA), Alberto Sánchez (ESP), Andrea Bongiorni (ITA)

17 March 2026	Iceland	62–60	Portugal	Reykjavík
19:30	Scoring by quarter: 14–19, 17–11, 21–17, 10–13
	Pts: Rodriguez 20; Rebs: Grímsdóttir 9 Asts: Rodriguez 6	Boxscore	Pts: Gurreiro 12; Rebs: Cruz 8 Asts: Soeiro 6	Arena: Ithrottamidstod Ásvellir; Attendance: 1,492; Referees: Sara Månsson (SWE), Lauri Jäämaa (FIN), Filip Szczesny (NOR)

==== Ranking of third-placed teams ====
Matches against the fourth-placed team in Groups A to F were not included in this ranking.

Pos	Grp	Team	Pld	W	L	PF	PA	PD	Pts	Qualification
1	F	Denmark	4	2	2	330	334	−4	6	Second round
2	B	Netherlands	4	1	3	292	318	−26	5	Second round
3	E	Ukraine	4	1	3	258	305	−47	5	Second round
4	G	Iceland	4	1	3	258	336	−78	5	
5	A	Ireland	4	0	4	266	337	−71	4	
6	D	Switzerland	4	0	4	279	325	−46	4	
7	C	Romania	4	0	4	202	328	−126	4	

Source: FIBA
Rules for classification: 1) Points; 2) Points difference; 3) Points scored.

== Second round ==
Matches will be played from 8 to 18 November 2026, and from 7 to 17 February 2027, with three match days per window.

=== Draw ===
The draw took place on 31 March 2026.

==== Teams ====
Entrance/qualification method	Team(s)
Advanced from First round	Austria; Bulgaria; Croatia; Denmark; Great Britain; Greece; Israel; Latvia; Luxembourg; Montenegro; Netherlands; Poland; Portugal; Serbia; Slovakia; Slovenia; Ukraine
Participating at the 2026 FIBA Women's Basketball World Cup Qualifying Tournaments	Czech Republic; France; Germany; Hungary; Italy; Spain; Turkey

==== Seeding ====
Seedings were announced on 25 March 2026.

Pot 1
Team	Pos
France	2
Spain	6
Germany	11
Serbia	12
Italy	14
Turkey	16

Pot 2
Team	Pos
Czech Republic	17
Hungary	19
Great Britain	24
Slovenia	25
Montenegro	26
Greece	27

Pot 3
Team	Pos
Slovakia	32
Latvia	35
Croatia	38
Portugal	40
Ukraine	41
Poland	43

Pot 4
Team	Pos
Israel	48
Luxembourg	52
Netherlands	54
Denmark	56
Bulgaria	58
Austria	73

=== Groups ===
==== Group I ====
Pos	Team	Pld	W	L	PF	PA	PD	Pts	Qualification
1	Turkey	3	2	1	232	208	+24	5	Final tournament
2	Poland	3	2	1	210	202	+8	5	Final tournament
3	Israel	3	1	2	212	214	−2	4	
4	Montenegro	3	1	2	186	216	−30	4	

Updated to match(es) played on 17 November 2026. Source: FIBA
Rules for classification: 1) Points; 2) Head-to-head; 3) Points difference; 4) Points scored.

11 November 2026	Turkey	79–62	Montenegro	Istanbul
19:00	Scoring by quarter: 18–14, 19–17, 20–11, 22–20
	Pts: Bayram 18; Rebs: Bayram 10; Asts: four players 3	Boxscore	Pts: Reimer 22; Rebs: Kovačević 12; Asts: Leković 5	Arena: Basketball Development Center; Attendance: 526; Referees: Milita Stalaučinskaitė (LTU), Mikheil Vartanov (GEO), Alessandro Perciavalle (ITA)

11 November 2026	Israel	64–75	Poland	Riga, Latvia
19:40	Scoring by quarter: 18–17, 16–17, 21–15, 9–26
	Pts: Baron 19; Rebs: Raber 15; Asts: Eisner 6	Boxscore	Pts: Wnorowska 21; Rebs: Borkowska 11; Asts: Niemojewska, Piasecka 5	Arena: Olympic Sports Centre; Attendance: 50; Referees: Sara Månsson (SWE), Anna Belousova (LAT), Tom Dehondt (BEL)

14 November 2026	Montenegro	61–56	Poland	Podgorica
18:00	Scoring by quarter: 15–14, 19–16, 13–13, 14–13
	Pts: Reimer 16; Rebs: Kovačević 14; Asts: Radonjić 6	Boxscore	Pts: Makurat 16; Rebs: Telenga 11; Asts: Wnorowska 4	Arena: Verde Sports Complex; Attendance: 274; Referees: Kirile Tvauri (GEO), Svetlana Stoyanova (BUL), Eirini Tsantali (GRE)

14 November 2026	Israel	67–76	Turkey	Riga, Latvia
19:40	Scoring by quarter: 10–22, 19–25, 20–13, 18–16
	Pts: Zipel 19; Rebs: Raber 13; Asts: Raber 5	Boxscore	Pts: Fitik 18; Rebs: Burke, Uzun 6 Asts: Uzun 6	Arena: Olympic Sports Centre; Attendance: 50; Referees: Igor Mitrovski (MKD), Joona Haaja (FIN), Raimonds Repelis (LAT)

17 November 2026	Poland	79–77	Turkey	Gorzów Wielkopolski
17:00	Scoring by quarter: 26–27, 12–23, 21–14, 20–13
	Pts: Mavunga 25; Rebs: Mavunga 11; Asts: Niemojewska 7	Boxscore	Pts: Onar 14; Rebs: Bayram 9 Asts: Uzun 5	Arena: Arena Gorzów; Attendance: 2,511; Referees: Ivana Ivanović (SRB), Romana Car (AUT), Luka Manojlović (SRB)

17 November 2026	Montenegro	63–81	Israel	Podgorica
18:00	Scoring by quarter: 8–17, 12–27, 21–21, 22–16
	Pts: Reimer, Radonjić 15; Rebs: Kovačević 12; Asts: Savković 6	Boxscore	Pts: Rotberg 17; Rebs: Raber 9 Asts: Tirosh 7	Arena: Verde Sports Complex; Attendance: 272; Referees: Edison Gjoni (ALB), Nikolett Gruber (HUN), Xhelal Mumini (KOS)

10 February 2027	Montenegro	vs.	Turkey
		Boxscore

10 February 2027	Poland	vs.	Israel
		Boxscore

13 February 2027	Poland	vs.	Montenegro
		Boxscore

13 February 2027	Turkey	vs.	Israel
		Boxscore

16 February 2027	Turkey	vs.	Poland
		Boxscore

16 February 2027	Israel	vs.	Montenegro
		Boxscore

==== Group J ====
Pos	Team	Pld	W	L	PF	PA	PD	Pts	Qualification
1	Spain	3	3	0	249	207	+42	6	Final tournament
2	Bulgaria	3	2	1	211	212	−1	5	Final tournament
3	Croatia	3	1	2	228	251	−23	4	
4	Czech Republic	3	0	3	193	211	−18	3	

Updated to match(es) played on 17 November 2026. Source: FIBA
Rules for classification: 1) Points; 2) Head-to-head; 3) Points difference; 4) Points scored.

10 November 2026	Spain	73–71	Czech Republic	Oviedo
20:30	Scoring by quarter: 20–11, 23–25, 14–21, 16–14
	Pts: Martín 18; Rebs: Araújo 7 Asts: Araújo 5	Boxscore	Pts: Holešínská 16; Rebs: four players 5 Asts: Pospíšilová 7	Arena: Palacio de los Deportes; Attendance: 4,505; Referees: Veronika Obertová (SVK), Jordan Wallet (FRA), Diogo Martins (POR)

11 November 2026	Bulgaria	91–74	Croatia	Samokov
16:00	Scoring by quarter: 25–22, 17–13, 25–24, 24–15
	Pts: Hristova 28; Rebs: Hillsman 9 Asts: Konstantinova 9	Boxscore	Pts: Dojkić 20; Rebs: Begić 13; Asts: Dojkić 6	Arena: Arena SamElyon; Attendance: 300; Referees: Amalia Marchiș (ROU), Nikolett Gruber (HUN), Or Zror (ISR)

14 November 2026	Czech Republic	69–82	Croatia	Prague
16:30	Scoring by quarter: 19–24, 14–24, 16–17, 20–17
	Pts: Voráčková 19; Rebs: Zeithammerová 7 Asts: Voráčková 5	Boxscore	Pts: Begić 20; Rebs: Cave 18; Asts: Lazić 7	Arena: Královka Arena; Attendance: 1,091; Referees: Bogna Podkowińska (POL), Irene Frosolini (ITA), Timo Axmann (AUT)

14 November 2026	Bulgaria	64–85	Spain	Samokov
19:00	Scoring by quarter: 21–20, 16–18, 16–25, 11–22
	Pts: Hristova 15; Rebs: Hillsman 11; Asts: Konstantinova 3	Boxscore	Pts: Martín 26; Rebs: Araújo 7 Asts: Martín 5	Arena: Arena SamElyon; Attendance: 1,500; Referees: Sergej Ćetković (MNE), Maria Ignatiou (CYP), Alija Ferevski (MKD)

17 November 2026	Czech Republic	53–56	Bulgaria	Prague
17:15	Scoring by quarter: 12–10, 18–12, 8–22, 15–12
	Pts: Holešínská 15; Rebs: Voráčková 9 Asts: Joklová 4	Boxscore	Pts: Kostowicz 17; Rebs: Kostowicz 21; Asts: Hristova 6	Arena: Královka Arena; Attendance: 1,415; Referees: Özlem Yalman (TUR), Amalia Marchiș (ROU), Nikolaos Tziopanos (GRE)

17 November 2026	Croatia	72–91	Spain	Poreč
18:00	Scoring by quarter: 20–15, 15–27, 22–25, 15–24
	Pts: Begić 22; Rebs: Begić 8 Asts: Lazić 11	Boxscore	Pts: Carrera 24; Rebs: Araújo, Carrera 6 Asts: Martín 9	Arena: Žatika Sport Centre; Attendance: 700; Referees: Milita Stalaučinskaitė (LTU), Eirini Tsantali (GRE), Michail Papaioannou (SUI)

10 February 2027	Czech Republic	vs.	Spain
		Boxscore

10 February 2027	Croatia	vs.	Bulgaria
		Boxscore

13 February 2027	Croatia	vs.	Czech Republic
		Boxscore

13 February 2027	Spain	vs.	Bulgaria
		Boxscore

16 February 2027	Spain	vs.	Croatia
		Boxscore

16 February 2027	Bulgaria	vs.	Czech Republic
		Boxscore

==== Group K ====
Pos	Team	Pld	W	L	PF	PA	PD	Pts	Qualification
1	Italy	3	3	0	210	179	+31	6	Final tournament
2	Slovenia	3	2	1	225	181	+44	5	Final tournament
3	Latvia	3	1	2	213	208	+5	4	
4	Austria	3	0	3	165	245	−80	3	

Updated to match(es) played on 17 November 2026. Source: FIBA
Rules for classification: 1) Points; 2) Head-to-head; 3) Points difference; 4) Points scored.

11 November 2026	Austria	66–81	Latvia	Vienna
18:00	Scoring by quarter: 15–19, 19–20, 17–26, 15–16
	Pts: Sagerer 16; Rebs: Fuchs-Robetin 9 Asts: Fuchs-Robetin 6	Boxscore	Pts: Krēsliņa 18; Rebs: Laksa, Pulvere 5 Asts: Pulvere 5	Arena: Sport Arena Wien; Attendance: 650; Referees: Peter Ženiš (SVK), Kirsten Poffé (BEL), Benedikt Loder (GER)

11 November 2026	Italy	67–62	Slovenia	Terni
20:00	Scoring by quarter: 19–12, 13–18, 22–17, 13–15
	Pts: Pan 17; Rebs: Cubaj, Keys 9 Asts: Verona, Zanardi 4	Boxscore	Pts: three players 14; Rebs: Friškovec 10; Asts: Cvijanovič 6	Arena: PalaTerni; Attendance: 2,530; Referees: Esperanza Mendoza (ESP), Edison Gjoni (ALB), Luka Manojlović (SRB)

14 November 2026	Slovenia	70–64	Latvia	Ljubljana
18:00	Scoring by quarter: 11–18, 25–15, 13–14, 21–17
	Pts: Friškovec 33; Rebs: Friškovec 9 Asts: Lisec 4	Boxscore	Pts: Gulbe 18; Rebs: Meldere 11; Asts: Pulvere 5	Arena: Kodeljevo Hall; Attendance: 700; Referees: Jan Baloun (CZE), Nikolett Gruber (HUN), Ádám Major (HUN)

14 November 2026	Austria	49–71	Italy	Vienna
18:00	Scoring by quarter: 11–26, 15–22, 5–16, 18–17
	Pts: Sagerer 21; Rebs: Fuchs-Robetin 7 Asts: Koizar 6	Boxscore	Pts: Andre, Cubaj 12; Rebs: Cubaj 11; Asts: Zanardi 8	Arena: Sport Arena Wien; Attendance: 1,000; Referees: Veronika Vávrová (CZE), László Goda (HUN), Veronika Vávrová (CZE)

17 November 2026	Latvia	68–72	Italy	Riga
19:00	Scoring by quarter: 20–22, 18–16, 17–19, 13–15
	Pts: Laksa 16; Rebs: Laksa 7 Asts: Pulvere 5	Boxscore	Pts: Keys 12; Rebs: Madera, Zanardi 6 Asts: Verona, Zanardi 6	Arena: Latvian Team Sports Hall; Attendance: 2,732; Referees: Jelena Tomić (CRO), Sara Månsson (SWE), Joona Haaja (FIN)

17 November 2026	Slovenia	93–50	Austria	Ljubljana
18:00	Scoring by quarter: 21–7, 21–11, 27–16, 24–16
	Pts: Goršič 26; Rebs: Goršič 9 Asts: Čeh 8	Boxscore	Pts: Koizar 17; Rebs: Sagerer 9 Asts: Koizar 4	Arena: Kodeljevo Hall; Attendance: 600; Referees: Michał Chrakowiecki (POL), Ewa Matuszewska (POL), Megaklis Marinakis (GRE)

10 February 2027	Slovenia	vs.	Italy
		Boxscore

10 February 2027	Latvia	vs.	Austria
		Boxscore

13 February 2027	Latvia	vs.	Slovenia
		Boxscore

13 February 2027	Italy	vs.	Austria
		Boxscore

16 February 2027	Italy	vs.	Latvia
		Boxscore

16 February 2027	Austria	vs.	Slovenia
		Boxscore

==== Group L ====
Pos	Team	Pld	W	L	PF	PA	PD	Pts	Qualification
1	Serbia	3	3	0	263	227	+36	6	Final tournament
2	Netherlands	3	2	1	230	216	+14	5	Final tournament
3	Greece	3	1	2	230	222	+8	4	
4	Slovakia	3	0	3	210	268	−58	3	

Updated to match(es) played on 17 November 2026. Source: FIBA
Rules for classification: 1) Points; 2) Head-to-head; 3) Points difference; 4) Points scored.

11 November 2026	Serbia	84–74	Greece	Belgrade
18:00	Scoring by quarter: 23–14, 17–17, 19–20, 25–23
	Pts: Janković 28; Rebs: Dugalić 6 Asts: Dugalić, Stanaćev 3	Boxscore	Pts: Parks 22; Rebs: Parks 7 Asts: Parks 5	Arena: Ranko Žeravica Sports Hall; Attendance: 2,167; Referees: Özlem Yalman (TUR), Ewa Matuszewska (POL), Monika Mincheva (BUL)

11 November 2026	Netherlands	80–69	Slovakia	Almere
19:30	Scoring by quarter: 25–12, 21–21, 22–20, 12–16
	Pts: Treffers 21; Rebs: Hof 10; Asts: Cornelius 6	Boxscore	Pts: Dudášová 17; Rebs: Dudášová 11; Asts: Dudášová 4	Arena: Topsportcentrum; Attendance: 1,294; Referees: Laure Coanus (FRA), Tom De Lange (BEL), Brehima Sissoko (FRA)

14 November 2026	Netherlands	82–89	Serbia	Rotterdam
14:30	Scoring by quarter: 26–25, 22–26, 20–18, 14–20
	Pts: Vanderklugt 20; Rebs: Treffers 7 Asts: three players 4	Boxscore	Pts: Nogić 28; Rebs: Janković 5 Asts: Raca, Turudić 4	Arena: Topsportcentrum Rotterdam; Attendance: 1,432; Referees: Maximilian Meiler (GER), Martin Van Hoye (BEL), Gavin Williams (GBR)

14 November 2026	Greece	98–70	Slovakia	Thessaloniki
19:00	Scoring by quarter: 20–15, 26–18, 27–22, 25–15
	Pts: Fasoula 26; Rebs: Fasoula 15; Asts: Spanou 8	Boxscore	Pts: Lambert, Mištinová 13; Rebs: Dudášová 5 Asts: Lambert 7	Arena: Ivanofeio Sports Arena; Attendance: 2,489; Referees: Zoran Mitrovski (MKD), Stefan Stefanov (BUL), Xhelal Mumini (KOS)

17 November 2026	Greece	58–68	Netherlands	Thessaloniki
18:00	Scoring by quarter: 26–11, 11–25, 9–15, 12–17
	Pts: Spanou 22; Rebs: Fasoula 11; Asts: Pavlopoulou 5	Boxscore	Pts: Treffers 14; Rebs: Van Kruistum 9 Asts: Cornelius 6	Arena: Ivanofeio Sports Arena; Attendance: 1,831; Referees: Nataša Dragojević (MNE), Vladimir Zanev (BUL), Michaela Scholzová (CZE)

17 November 2026	Slovakia	71–90	Serbia	Bratislava
18:00	Scoring by quarter: 11–25, 24–22, 18–23, 18–20
	Pts: Dudášová 18; Rebs: Jakubcová, Moravčíková 4 Asts: Dudášová 6	Boxscore	Pts: Janković 24; Rebs: Dugalić 7 Asts: Stanaćev 6	Arena: Gopass Arena; Attendance: 2,147; Referees: Gabrielius Simanavičius (LTU), Bogna Podkowińska (POL), Andrea Valzani (ITA)

10 February 2027	Greece	vs.	Serbia
		Boxscore

10 February 2027	Slovakia	vs.	Netherlands
		Boxscore

13 February 2027	Slovakia	vs.	Greece
		Boxscore

13 February 2027	Serbia	vs.	Netherlands
		Boxscore

16 February 2027	Serbia	vs.	Slovakia
		Boxscore

16 February 2027	Netherlands	vs.	Greece
		Boxscore

==== Group M ====
Pos	Team	Pld	W	L	PF	PA	PD	Pts	Qualification
1	France	3	3	0	312	166	+146	6	Final tournament
2	Great Britain	3	2	1	229	245	−16	5	Final tournament
3	Ukraine	3	1	2	207	245	−38	4	
4	Luxembourg	3	0	3	159	251	−92	3	

Updated to match(es) played on 17 November 2026. Source: FIBA
Rules for classification: 1) Points; 2) Head-to-head; 3) Points difference; 4) Points scored.

11 November 2026	France	104–57	Great Britain	Mouilleron-le-Captif
17:30	Scoring by quarter: 28–17, 24–19, 25–7, 27–14
	Pts: Fauthoux 23; Rebs: Gueye 10; Asts: Fauthoux 8	Boxscore	Pts: Wallace 16; Rebs: Wilkinson 5 Asts: Beckford-Norton, Wallace 3	Arena: Vendéspace; Attendance: 4,031; Referees: Sandra Sánchez (ESP), Chess Van Looy (BEL), Irene Frosolini (ITA)

11 November 2026	Luxembourg	52–64	Ukraine	Luxembourg City
19:00	Scoring by quarter: 9–20, 16–11, 14–13, 13–20
	Pts: Simon 16; Rebs: Oly 9 Asts: Mreches 3	Boxscore	Pts: Iagupova 20; Rebs: Yurkevichus 13; Asts: Iagupova 8	Arena: d'Coque; Attendance: 640; Referees: Maximilian Meiler (GER), Nika Štampalija (CRO), Michail Papaioannou (SUI)

14 November 2026	Great Britain	85–83	Ukraine	Manchester
17:00	Scoring by quarter: 18–27, 17–14, 18–22, 32–20
	Pts: Wilkinson 22; Rebs: Wilkinson 10; Asts: Beckford-Norton 10	Boxscore	Pts: Iagupova 26; Rebs: Yurkevichus 18; Asts: Iagupova 6	Arena: National Basketball Performance Centre; Attendance: 1,050; Referees: Milita Stalaučinskaitė (LTU), Juho-Topias Tuomaala (FIN), Bjarki Thór Vidarsson (ISL)

14 November 2026	Luxembourg	49–100	France	Luxembourg City
18:00	Scoring by quarter: 7–20, 18–21, 14–26, 10–33
	Pts: Simon 18; Rebs: Mreches, Olsen 3 Asts: Mreches 3	Boxscore	Pts: Touré 20; Rebs: three players 5 Asts: Ayayi 6	Arena: d'Coque; Attendance: 2,200; Referees: Armin Mutapcic (GER), Pierre Gilis (BEL), Marija Ćirić (SRB)

17 November 2026	Ukraine	60–108	France	Riga, Latvia
15:00	Scoring by quarter: 22–19, 19–24, 9–33, 10–32
	Pts: Uro-Nilie 17; Rebs: Yurkevichus 6 Asts: Hutevych, Iagupova 4	Boxscore	Pts: Angloma 20; Rebs: Ayayi 7 Asts: Touré 8	Arena: Latvian Team Sports Hall; Attendance: 215; Referees: Jānis Rozenbergs (LAT), Samu Turunen (FIN), Anna Belousova (LAT)

17 November 2026	Great Britain	87–58	Luxembourg	Manchester
20:00	Scoring by quarter: 22–14, 25–17, 22–16, 18–11
	Pts: Wilkinson 24; Rebs: Wilkinson 13; Asts: Eadsforth-Yates, Wilkinson 3	Boxscore	Pts: Mreches 20; Rebs: Oly 9 Asts: Simon 3	Arena: National Basketball Performance Centre; Attendance: 750; Referees: Veronika Obertová (SVK), Nermin Hodžić (GER), Jóhannes Friðriksson (ISL)

10 February 2027	Great Britain	vs.	France
		Boxscore

10 February 2027	Ukraine	vs.	Luxembourg
		Boxscore

13 February 2027	Ukraine	vs.	Great Britain
		Boxscore

13 February 2027	France	vs.	Luxembourg
		Boxscore

16 February 2027	France	vs.	Ukraine
		Boxscore

16 February 2027	Luxembourg	vs.	Great Britain
		Boxscore

==== Group N ====
Pos	Team	Pld	W	L	PF	PA	PD	Pts	Qualification
1	Hungary	3	3	0	220	180	+40	6	Final tournament
2	Germany	3	2	1	225	193	+32	5	Final tournament
3	Portugal	3	1	2	187	200	−13	4	
4	Denmark	3	0	3	193	252	−59	3	

Updated to match(es) played on 17 November 2026. Source: FIBA
Rules for classification: 1) Points; 2) Head-to-head; 3) Points difference; 4) Points scored.

11 November 2026	Denmark	62–79	Portugal	Gentofte
18:30	Scoring by quarter: 25–13, 7–29, 13–20, 17–17
	Pts: Gudmand, Okosun 16; Rebs: Okosun 16; Asts: Okosun 5	Boxscore	Pts: Rodrigues 24; Rebs: Filipe 6 Asts: Rodrigues 7	Arena: Gentofte Sportspark; Attendance: 752; Referees: Jānis Rozenbergs (LAT), Shaker Nasrollah (SWE), Filip Szczesny (NOR)

11 November 2026	Germany	64–70	Hungary	Hamburg
19:00	Scoring by quarter: 19–27, 14–14, 16–13, 15–16
	Pts: Fiebich 19; Rebs: Eichmeyer, Fiebich 8 Asts: Daub 7	Boxscore	Pts: Lelik 18; Rebs: Takács-Kiss 11; Asts: Lelik 11	Arena: Inselpark Arena; Attendance: 2,892; Referees: Jelena Tomić (CRO), Danilo Petković (SRB), Giacomo Dori (ITA)

14 November 2026	Denmark	71–88	Germany	Gentofte
15:00	Scoring by quarter: 17–17, 11–22, 27–23, 16–26
	Pts: Okosun 18; Rebs: Okosun 9 Asts: Rimdal 6	Boxscore	Pts: Wilke 20; Rebs: Bühner 9 Asts: Zolper 5	Arena: Gentofte Sportspark; Attendance: 978; Referees: Nataša Dragojević (MNE), Montis Rozenfelds (LAT), Hammadi Neffati (SWE)

14 November 2026	Hungary	65–56	Portugal	Miskolc
18:00	Scoring by quarter: 15–16, 12–14, 17–14, 21–12
	Pts: Takács-Kiss 21; Rebs: Juhász 16; Asts: Lelik 7	Boxscore	Pts: Guerreiro 16; Rebs: Guerreiro 8 Asts: Rodrigues 5	Arena: DVTK Aréna; Attendance: 1,800; Referees: Ivo Kitsing (EST), Romana Car (AUT), Jean Ruhamiriza (RWA)

17 November 2026	Hungary	85–60	Denmark	Miskolc
18:00	Scoring by quarter: 23–25, 21–14, 21–9, 20–12
	Pts: Lelik 22; Rebs: Takács-Kiss 16; Asts: Juhász 6	Boxscore	Pts: Okosun 22; Rebs: Okosun 9 Asts: Rimdal 4	Arena: DVTK Aréna; Attendance: 1,700; Referees: Laure Coanus (FRA), Svetlana Stoyanova (BUL), Romana Stojanović (SRB)

17 November 2026	Portugal	52–73	Germany	Odivelas
19:00	Scoring by quarter: 14–21, 13–16, 14–18, 11–18
	Pts: Rodrigues, Filipe 10; Rebs: da Silva, Guerreiro 6 Asts: Rodrigues 4	Boxscore	Pts: Bühner 15; Rebs: Bühner 10; Asts: Geiselsöder, Daub 5	Arena: Pavilhão Multiusos de Odivelas; Attendance: 1,037; Referees: Esperanza Mendoza (ESP), Sandra Sánchez (ESP), James Dominique (GIB)

10 February 2027	Hungary	vs.	Germany
		Boxscore

10 February 2027	Portugal	vs.	Denmark
		Boxscore

13 February 2027	Portugal	vs.	Hungary
		Boxscore

13 February 2027	Germany	vs.	Denmark
		Boxscore

16 February 2027	Germany	vs.	Portugal
		Boxscore

16 February 2027	Denmark	vs.	Hungary
		Boxscore

== Qualified teams ==
Team	Qualification method	Date of qualification	Appearance(s)				Previous best performance (Note: Bold text indicates they hosted that edition.)	WR (Note: World ranking at start of tournament.)
Team	Qualification method	Date of qualification	Total	First	Last	Streak	Previous best performance	WR
Finland	Host nation	24 November 2023	6th	1952	1987	1	Eleventh place (1952, 1956)	TBD
Lithuania	Host nation	24 November 2023	13th	1938	2025	2	Champions (1997)	TBD
Belgium	Host nation	28 November 2024	16th	1950	2025	6	Champions (2023, 2025)	TBD
Sweden	Host nation	28 November 2024	10th	1978	2025	2	Sixth place (2019)	TBD

== Group H ==
The four co-hosts are placed in one group and their results do not count into the qualifying process. Matches will be played in November 2025, November 2026 and February 2027, with two matchdays per window.

Pos	Team	Pld	W	L	PF	PA	PD	Pts
1	Belgium	4	3	1	338	296	+42	7
2	Finland	4	3	1	307	315	−8	7
3	Lithuania	4	2	2	303	284	+19	6
4	Sweden	4	0	4	294	347	−53	4

Updated to match(es) played on 15 November 2026. Source: FIBA
Rules for classification: 1) Points; 2) Head-to-head; 3) Points difference; 4) Points scored.

13 November 2025	Sweden	65–87	Lithuania	Norrköping
19:00	Scoring by quarter: 15–28, 22–23, 14–18, 14–18
	Pts: Holm 15; Rebs: Halvarsson 5 Asts: Holm 9	Boxscore	Pts: Jocytė 19; Rebs: Juškaitė 8 Asts: Juškaitė 6	Arena: Stadium Arena; Attendance: 1,492; Referees: Rainis Värv (EST), Denys Povorozniuk (UKR), Bogna Podkowińska (POL)

13 November 2025	Belgium	95–71	Finland	Leuven
20:45	Scoring by quarter: 31–15, 19–17, 23–17, 22–22
	Pts: Meesseman 19; Rebs: Meesseman 9 Asts: Allemand 7	Boxscore	Pts: Bejedi 26; Rebs: Kuier 6 Asts: three players 2	Arena: Sportoase Leuven; Attendance: 3,300; Referees: Suzana Vujičić (MNE), Emma Perry (IRL), Maria Ignatiou (CYP)

16 November 2025	Lithuania	73–69	Belgium	Vilnius
18:30	Scoring by quarter: 11–14, 21–23, 15–16, 26–16
	Pts: Jocytė, Meškonytė 12; Rebs: Juškaitė 9 Asts: Juškaitė 6	Boxscore	Pts: Mununga 12; Rebs: Mununga 7 Asts: Claessens, Ramette 3	Arena: Active Vilnius Arena; Attendance: 2,516; Referees: Veronika Obertová (SVK), Armin Mutapcic (GER), Jelena Tomić (CRO)

16 November 2025	Finland	86–77	Sweden	Vantaa
18:30	Scoring by quarter: 24–16, 21–20, 21–20, 20–21
	Pts: Bejedi 18; Rebs: Kuier 7 Asts: Kuier 7	Boxscore	Pts: Ekh, Sabel 17; Rebs: Wadling 8 Asts: Holm 8	Arena: Energia Areena; Attendance: 1,479; Referees: Viola Györgyi (ROU), Elvis Binders-Čoders (LAT), Nikola Bejat (NOR)

12 November 2026	Lithuania	74–76	Finland	Klaipėda
18:30	Scoring by quarter: 18–20, 20–12, 19–25, 17–19
	Pts: Juškaitė 19; Rebs: Juškaitė 10; Asts: Juškaitė, Šventoraitė 4	Boxscore	Pts: Lahtinen 18; Rebs: Kuier 12; Asts: Kuier 6	Arena: Švyturio Arena; Attendance: 1,782; Referees: Viola Györgyi (ROU), Raimonds Repelis (LAT), Kristīne Kasparāne (LAT)

12 November 2026	Belgium	93–78	Sweden	Charleroi
20:30	Scoring by quarter: 23–24, 20–20, 23–21, 27–13
	Pts: Meesseman 26; Rebs: Linskens 14; Asts: Massey, Vanloo 4	Boxscore	Pts: Holm 22; Rebs: Johansson, Sabel 6 Asts: Holm, Persson 6	Arena: Dôme; Attendance: 4,633; Referees: Ivana Ivanović (SRB), Stan Kestein (NED), Mateusz Skorek (POL)

15 November 2026	Finland	74–69	Lithuania	Helsinki
16:00	Scoring by quarter: 17–16, 18–18, 29–10, 10–25
	Pts: Kuier 24; Rebs: Kuier 7 Asts: Aarnisalo, Kuier 5	Boxscore	Pts: Juškaitė, Šventoraitė 12; Rebs: Ūsė 7 Asts: Jocytė 5	Arena: Urhea Centre; Attendance: 1,153; Referees: Elvis Binders-Čoders (LAT), Paweł Pacek (POL), Stefán Kristinsson (ISL)

15 November 2026	Sweden	74–81	Belgium	Bromma
16:00	Scoring by quarter: 23–22, 24–17, 14–18, 13–24
	Pts: Holm 28; Rebs: Holm 9 Asts: Holm 5	Boxscore	Pts: Meesseman 27; Rebs: Meesseman 12; Asts: Vanloo 9	Arena: Ulvsunda Idrottscentrum; Attendance: 2,128; Referees: Jānis Rozenbergs (LAT), Romana Stojanović (SRB), Jóhannes Friðriksson (ISL)

11 February 2027	Finland	vs.	Belgium
		Boxscore

11 February 2027	Lithuania	vs.	Sweden
		Boxscore

14 February 2027	Belgium	vs.	Lithuania
		Boxscore

14 February 2027	Sweden	vs.	Finland
		Boxscore
