= 2017 FIBA U18 Women's European Championship =

34th FIBA Under-18 Women's European Basketball Championship

Tournament details
- Host country: Hungary
- Dates: 5–13 August 2017
- Teams: 16
- Venue: 1 (in 1 host city)

Final positions
- Champions: Belgium (2nd title)

Tournament statistics
- MVP: (Belgium) Billie Massey
- Top scorer: (Sweden) Klara Lundquist (23.1)
- Top rebounds: (Belgium) Billie Massey (13.0)
- Top assists: (Serbia) Ivana Katanić (6.0)
- PPG (Team): (Lithuania) (70.9)
- RPG (Team): (Czech Republic) (48.9)
- APG (Team): (Hungary) (21.7)

Official website
- www.fiba.basketball

The 2017 FIBA U18 Women's European Championship was an international basketball competition that was held from 5 to 13 August 2017 in Hungary. It was the 34th edition of the championship. 16 national teams from across Europe, composed of women aged 18 and under, competed in the tournament.

== Venues ==
Sopron	2017 FIBA U18 Women's European Championship is located in Hungary
Novomatic Aréna	2017 FIBA U18 Women's European Championship is located in Hungary
Capacity: 2,000	2017 FIBA U18 Women's European Championship is located in Hungary

== Participating teams ==
- Belgium
- Bosnia and Herzegovina ▲ (Third place, 2016 FIBA U18 Women's European Championship Division B)
- Croatia
- Czech Republic
- France
- Greece ▲ (Runners-up, 2016 FIBA U18 Women's European Championship Division B)
- Hungary (Host)
- Italy
- Latvia
- Lithuania
- Russia
- Serbia
- Slovenia
- Sweden ▲ (Winners, 2016 FIBA U18 Women's European Championship Division B)
- Spain
- Turkey

== First round ==
The first-round groups draw took place on 10 December 2016 in Prague, Czech Republic.

All times are local (UTC+2).

=== Group A ===
Pos	Team	Pld	W	L	PF	PA	PD	Pts
1	Spain	3	3	0	226	172	+54	6
2	Sweden	3	2	1	184	194	−10	5
3	Serbia	3	1	2	206	203	+3	4
4	Croatia	3	0	3	171	218	−47	3

Source: FIBA

5 August
13:00

Boxscore

Sweden	52–85	Spain
Scoring by quarter: 21–21, 10–20, 11–25, 10–19
Pts: K. Lundquist 24; Rebs: K. Lundquist 6 Asts: L. Hjern 3		Pts: I. Junio 11; Rebs: M. Pendande 6 Asts: P. Gonzalez 5

Novomatic Aréna II, Sopron
Referees: Mila Čavara (BIH), Gellért Kapitány (HUN), Volodymyr Pediev (UKR)

5 August
18:15

Boxscore

Serbia	82–66	Croatia
Scoring by quarter: 23–15, 22–16, 13–11, 24–24
Pts: T. Turudic 20; Rebs: T. Turudic 9 Asts: I. Katanic 7		Pts: A. Katavic 17; Rebs: L. Kostic 7 Asts: M. Tadic 9

Novomatic Aréna II, Sopron
Referees: Tomas Jasevičius (LTU), Anton Makhlin (RUS), Gavin Williams (WAL)

6 August
13:30

Boxscore

Croatia	40–62	Sweden
Scoring by quarter: 8–15, 16–18, 6–14, 10–15
Pts: J. Pavic 14; Rebs: A. Katavic 12; Asts: M. Tadic 5		Pts: K. Lundquist 19; Rebs: K. Lundquist 12; Asts: K. Lundquist 4

Novomatic Aréna, Sopron
Referees: Manuel Mazzoni (ITA), Mathieu Hosselet (FRA), Anton Makhlin (RUS)

6 August
20:15

Boxscore

Spain	67–55	Serbia
Scoring by quarter: 21–9, 11–11, 17–15, 18–20
Pts: I. Junio 17; Rebs: I. Junio 12; Asts: A. Prieto 4		Pts: N. Naumcev 15; Rebs: I. Raca 7 Asts: I. Katanic 5

Novomatic Aréna, Sopron
Referees: Alexey Davydov (RUS), Zoltán Palla (HUN), Bernard Vassallo (MLT)

7 August
15:15

Boxscore

Serbia	69–70	Sweden
Scoring by quarter: 16–17, 12–22, 15–19, 26–12
Pts: M. Djordjevic 13; Rebs: I. Katanic 9 Asts: N. Dimitrijevic 8		Pts: K. Lundquist 28; Rebs: K. Lundquist 12; Asts: L. Hjern 6

Novomatic Aréna II, Sopron
Referees: Manuel Mazzoni (ITA), Igor Esteve Malmierca (AND), Gavin Williams (WAL)

7 August
17:30

Boxscore

Spain	74–65	Croatia
Scoring by quarter: 18–14, 25–9, 20–23, 11–19
Pts: L. Rodriguez 16; Rebs: S. Serrat 6 Asts: A. Ayuso 4		Pts: M. Tadic 15; Rebs: M. Tadic 7 Asts: A. Katavic 3

Novomatic Aréna II, Sopron
Referees: Mathieu Hosselet (FRA), Anastasios Manos (GRE), Sarty Nghixulifwa (NAM)

=== Group B ===
Pos	Team	Pld	W	L	PF	PA	PD	Pts
1	Hungary	3	3	0	239	171	+68	6
2	Latvia	3	2	1	185	202	−17	5
3	Greece	3	1	2	187	215	−28	4
4	Turkey	3	0	3	167	190	−23	3

Source: FIBA

5 August
15:15

Boxscore

Greece	62–71	Latvia
Scoring by quarter: 8–18, 17–16, 15–19, 22–18
Pts: E. Tsineke 33; Rebs: A. Tsineke 6 Asts: A. Tzanetatou 8		Pts: A. Gulbe 15; Rebs: A. Gulbe 7 Asts: L. Septe 5

Novomatic Aréna II, Sopron
Referees: Mathieu Hosselet (FRA), Sarty Nghixulifwa (NAM), Zdenko Zubak (SVK)

5 August
18:15

Boxscore

Hungary	67–55	Turkey
Scoring by quarter: 20–12, 19–10, 15–12, 13–21
Pts: L. Gereben 17; Rebs: R. Lelik 10; Asts: P. Pusztai 7		Pts: M. Yildizhan 16; Rebs: E. Kurtyemez 7 Asts: D. Alper 3

Novomatic Aréna, Sopron
Referees: Anastasios Manos (GRE), Pedro Alfonso Vásquez González (CHI), Bernard Vassallo (MLT)

6 August
13:00

Boxscore

Turkey	57–62	Greece
Scoring by quarter: 13–15, 13–15, 14–9, 17–23
Pts: D. Alper 26; Rebs: I. Guner 13; Asts: M. Yildizhan 7		Pts: E. Tsineke 23; Rebs: M. Anastasopoulou 8 Asts: E. Tsineke 5

Novomatic Aréna II, Sopron
Referees: Tomas Jasevičius (LTU), Volodymyr Pediev (UKR), Gavin Williams (WAL)

6 August
18:00

Boxscore

Latvia	53–85	Hungary
Scoring by quarter: 14–23, 12–19, 16–19, 11–24
Pts: J. Rozentale 14; Rebs: J. Rozentale 12; Asts: L. Septe 2		Pts: B. Meresz 20; Rebs: D. Juhasz 12; Asts: P. Pusztai 6

Novomatic Aréna, Sopron
Referees: Mila Čavara (BIH), Igor Esteve Malmierca (AND), Sarty Nghixulifwa (NAM)

7 August
13:30

Boxscore

Latvia	61–55	Turkey
Scoring by quarter: 19–13, 25–10, 13–14, 4–18
Pts: J. Rozentale 14; Rebs: J. Rozentale 9 Asts: M. Klavina 5		Pts: I. Guner 20; Rebs: I. Guner 16; Asts: I. Guner 3

Novomatic Aréna, Sopron
Referees: Alexey Davydov (RUS), Mila Čavara (BIH), Ivana Ivanović (SRB)

7 August
18:00

Boxscore

Hungary	87–63	Greece
Scoring by quarter: 23–12, 19–16, 27–16, 18–19
Pts: D. Juhasz 25; Rebs: D. Juhasz 8 Asts: P. Pusztai 6		Pts: I. Prapa 12; Rebs: E. Tsineke 8 Asts: E. Tsineke 5

Novomatic Aréna, Sopron
Referees: Tomas Jasevičius (LTU), Anton Makhlin (RUS), Zdenko Zubak (SVK)

=== Group C ===
Pos	Team	Pld	W	L	PF	PA	PD	Pts
1	Czech Republic	3	3	0	208	170	+38	6
2	Russia	3	1	2	187	188	−1	4 (Note: Russia 1–1, +10PD; Lithuania 1–1, +9PD; Slovenia 1–1, −19PD)
3	Lithuania	3	1	2	206	208	−2	4
4	Slovenia	3	1	2	174	209	−35	4

Source: FIBA
Notes:

5 August
13:00

Boxscore

Slovenia	57–73	Czech Republic
Scoring by quarter: 14–26, 12–18, 19–19, 12–10
Pts: Z. Friskovec 21; Rebs: T. Gorsic 8 Asts: A. Kroselj 5		Pts: V. Vorackova 15; Rebs: V. Vorackova 13; Asts: N. Raskova 5

Novomatic Aréna, Sopron
Referees: Nikola Perlić (CRO), Igor Esteve Malmierca (AND), Ivana Ivanović (SRB)

5 August
20:30

Boxscore

Russia	65–79	Lithuania
Scoring by quarter: 15–17, 15–19, 15–23, 20–20
Pts: A. Zaitceva 12; Rebs: A. Zaitceva 8 Asts: D. Repnikova 5		Pts: K. Serkeviciute 14; Rebs: L. Sakeviciute 7 Asts: K. Serkeviciute 4

Novomatic Aréna II, Sopron
Referees: Nikola Perlić (CRO), Igor Esteve Malmierca (AND), Zoltán Palla (HUN)

6 August
15:15

Boxscore

Lithuania	67–72	Slovenia
Scoring by quarter: 12–25, 14–20, 18–11, 23–16
Pts: K. Serkeviciute 14; Rebs: G. Segzdaite 9 Asts: D. Donskichyte 3		Pts: Z. Friskovec 22; Rebs: G. Kramzar 8 Asts: A. Kroselj 6

Novomatic Aréna II, Sopron
Referees: Zafer Yılmaz (TUR), Tamás Földházi (HUN), Zdenko Zubak (SVK)

6 August
19:45

Boxscore

Czech Republic	64–53	Russia
Scoring by quarter: 23–14, 15–15, 12–11, 14–13
Pts: A. Smutna 22; Rebs: V. Vorackova 11; Asts: K. Sotolova 9		Pts: V. Kozhukhar 12; Rebs: A. Zaitceva 7 Asts: O. Safonova 5

Novomatic Aréna II, Sopron
Referees: Jasmina Juras (SRB), Tamas Benczur (HUN), Ivana Ivanović (SRB)

7 August
15:45

Boxscore

Russia	69–45	Slovenia
Scoring by quarter: 22–7, 13–14, 25–9, 9–15
Pts: V. Kozhukhar 12; Rebs: A. Zaitceva 10; Asts: O. Stolyar 5		Pts: Z. Friskovec 12; Rebs: T. Gorsic 5 Asts: E. Prevodnik 4

Novomatic Aréna, Sopron
Referees: Bernard Vassallo (MLT), Volodymyr Pediev (UKR), Pedro Alfonso Vásquez González (CHI)

7 August
20:15

Boxscore

Czech Republic	71–60	Lithuania
Scoring by quarter: 18–11, 16–16, 14–13, 23–20
Pts: A. Smutna 18; Rebs: B. Tomancova 7 Asts: V. Vorackova 6		Pts: D. Donskichyte 14; Rebs: G. Segzdaite 8 Asts: K. Serkeviciute 3

Novomatic Aréna, Sopron
Referees: Jasmina Juras (SRB), Zoltán Palla (HUN), Nikola Perlić (CRO)

=== Group D ===
Pos	Team	Pld	W	L	PF	PA	PD	Pts
1	Italy	3	2	1	180	138	+42	5 (Note: Italy 1–1, +15PD; Belgium 1–1, −5PD; France 1–1, −10PD)
2	Belgium	3	2	1	156	157	−1	5
3	France	3	2	1	162	154	+8	5
4	Bosnia and Herzegovina	3	0	3	151	200	−49	3

Source: FIBA
Notes:

5 August
15:15

Boxscore

Bosnia and Herzegovina	44–71	Italy
Scoring by quarter: 15–21, 15–13, 6–15, 8–22
Pts: S. Heljic 12; Rebs: S. Heljic 13; Asts: S. Azinovic 5		Pts: M. Fassina 13; Rebs: S. Madera 9 Asts: M. Fassina 5

Novomatic Aréna, Sopron
Referees: Zafer Yılmaz (TUR), Mykola Ambrosov (UKR), Tamas Benczur (HUN)

5 August
20:30

Boxscore

France	52–43	Belgium
Scoring by quarter: 21–11, 11–7, 11–9, 9–16
Pts: K. Sissoko 10; Rebs: T. Pouye 5 Asts: T. Pouye 3		Pts: B. Massey 14; Rebs: B. Massey 9 Asts: B. Massey 2

Novomatic Aréna, Sopron
Referees: Jasmina Juras (SRB), Tamás Földházi (HUN), Arnis Ozols (LAT)

6 August
15:45

Boxscore

Belgium	55–51	Bosnia and Herzegovina
Scoring by quarter: 21–6, 9–10, 20–22, 5–13
Pts: B. Massey 15; Rebs: B. Massey 13; Asts: E. Hambursin 4		Pts: S. Azinovic 15; Rebs: I. Krakic 6 Asts: S. Azinovic 4

Novomatic Aréna, Sopron
Referees: Anastasios Manos (GRE), Mykola Ambrosov (UKR), Gellért Kapitány (HUN)

6 August
17:30

Boxscore

Italy	55–36	France
Scoring by quarter: 18–12, 9–6, 15–9, 13–9
Pts: C. Verona 15; Rebs: L. Cubaj 8 Asts: L. Cubaj 3		Pts: C. Germond 10; Rebs: N. Fofana 7 Asts: N. Fofana 3

Novomatic Aréna II, Sopron
Referees: Nikola Perlić (CRO), Arnis Ozols (LAT), Pedro Alfonso Vásquez González (CHI)

7 August
13:00

Boxscore

France	74–56	Bosnia and Herzegovina
Scoring by quarter: 13–19, 27–12, 15–14, 19–11
Pts: N. Mbandu 13; Rebs: K. Sissoko 7 Asts: T. Pouye 4		Pts: S. Azinovic 20; Rebs: I. Krakic 6 Asts: S. Azinovic 3

Novomatic Aréna II, Sopron
Referees: Zafer Yılmaz (TUR), Tamas Benczur (HUN), Tamás Földházi (HUN)

7 August
19:45

Boxscore

Italy	54–58 (OT)	Belgium
Scoring by quarter: 18–10, 10–13, 8–16, 15–12, Overtime: 3–7
Pts: E. Pinzan 22; Rebs: L. Cubaj 12; Asts: L. Cubaj 3		Pts: B. Massey 18; Rebs: B. Massey 12; Asts: E. Hambursin 7

Novomatic Aréna II, Sopron
Referees: Arnis Ozols (LAT), Mykola Ambrosov (UKR), Gellért Kapitány (HUN)

== Knockout stage ==
=== Bracket ===
Round of 16
9 August
Spain	72
Turkey	46
9 August
Russia	60
France	63
9 August
Latvia	60
Serbia	66
9 August
Italy	51
Slovenia	53
9 August
Sweden	72
Greece	61
9 August
Czech Republic	75
Bosnia and Herzegovina	55
9 August
Hungary	67
Croatia	41
9 August
Belgium	58
Lithuania	55

Quarter-finals
10 August
Spain	45
France	51
10 August
Serbia	74
Slovenia	63
10 August
Sweden	43
Czech Republic	71
10 August
Hungary	56
Belgium	59

Semi-finals
12 August
France	48
Serbia	66
12 August
Czech Republic	49
Belgium	63

Final
13 August
Serbia	53
Belgium	55
3rd place game
13 August
France	55
Czech Republic	48

5th–8th place bracket

5th–8th place semifinals
12 August
Spain	63
Slovenia	62
12 August
Sweden	43
Hungary	59

5th place game
13 August
Spain	55
Hungary	74
7th place game
13 August
Slovenia	70
Sweden	67

9th–16th place bracket

9th–16th place quarterfinals
10 August
Turkey	44
Russia	84
10 August
Latvia	57
Italy	82
10 August
Greece	65
Bosnia and Herzegovina	80
10 August
Croatia	69
Lithuania	67

9th–12th place semifinals
12 August
Russia	62
Italy	71
12 August
Bosnia and Herzegovina	52
Croatia	80

9th place game
13 August
Italy	63
Croatia	71
11th place game
13 August
Russia	90
Bosnia and Herzegovina	73

13th–16th place bracket

13th–16th place semifinals
12 August
Turkey	63
Latvia	67
12 August
Greece	57
Lithuania	96

13th place game
13 August
Latvia	81
Lithuania	72
15th place game
13 August
Turkey	71
Greece	62

=== Round of 16 ===
9 August 2017
13:00

Boxscore

Sweden	72–61	Greece
Scoring by quarter: 22–10, 12–14, 26–18, 12–19
Pts: Lundquist 25; Rebs: Jeng, Lundquist 10; Asts: Hjern 5		Pts: E. Tsineke 16; Rebs: E. Tsineke 10; Asts: E. Tsineke 5

Novomatic Aréna II, Sopron
Referees: Nikola Perlić (CRO), Tamás Benczur (HUN), Ivana Ivanović (SRB)

9 August 2017
13:30

Boxscore

Russia	60–63	France
Scoring by quarter: 14–23, 19–6, 15–11, 12–23
Pts: Zaitceva 17; Rebs: Kosulnikova 11; Asts: Stolyar, Zaitceva 4		Pts: Pouye, Sissoko 15; Rebs: Fofana 9 Asts: Jeanneaux 3

Novomatic Aréna, Sopron
Referees: Tomas Jasevičius (LTU), Anastasios Manos (GRE), Gavin Williams (WAL)

9 August 2017
15:15

Boxscore

Czech Republic	75–55	Bosnia and Herzegovina
Scoring by quarter: 16–10, 7–10, 29–16, 23–19
Pts: Brabencová 18; Rebs: Voráčková 10; Asts: Šotolová, Voráčková 6		Pts: Visković 18; Rebs: Heljić 10; Asts: Azinović 3

Novomatic Aréna II, Sopron
Referees: Alexey Davydov (RUS), Igor Esteve Malmierca (AND), Zdenko Zubak (SVK)

9 August 2017
15:45

Boxscore

Spain	72–46	Turkey
Scoring by quarter: 24–6, 14–10, 18–15, 16–15
Pts: N. Rodríguez 13; Rebs: Pendande 11; Asts: Camilion, L. Rodríguez 3		Pts: Güner 14; Rebs: Güner 7 Asts: Şahin 3

Novomatic Aréna, Sopron
Referees: Jasmina Juras (SRB), Tamás Földházi (HUN), Sarty Nghixulifwa (NAM)

9 August 2017
17:30

Boxscore

Latvia	60–66	Serbia
Scoring by quarter: 11–20, 17–17, 17–11, 15–18
Pts: Ozola 17; Rebs: Rozentāle 14; Asts: Lipe 3		Pts: Turudić 21; Rebs: Đorđević 10; Asts: Katanić, Dimitrijević 4

Novomatic Aréna II, Sopron
Referees: Zafer Yılmaz (TUR), Gellért Kapitány (HUN), Pedro Alfonso Vásquez González (CHI)

9 August 2017
18:00

Boxscore

Hungary	67–41	Croatia
Scoring by quarter: 8–14, 21–4, 20–12, 18–11
Pts: Juhász, Lelik 12; Rebs: Czukor 7 Asts: three players 4		Pts: Erjavec 15; Rebs: Vojtulek 9 Asts: Kostić 4

Novomatic Aréna, Sopron
Referees: Arnis Ozols (LAT), Mykola Ambrosov (UKR), Volodymyr Pediev (UKR)

9 August 2017
19:45

Boxscore

Italy	51–53	Slovenia
Scoring by quarter: 15–21, 11–12, 12–10, 13–10
Pts: Madera 16; Rebs: Cubaj 7 Asts: Verona 4		Pts: Friškovec 21; Rebs: Goršič 13; Asts: three players 3

Novomatic Aréna II, Sopron
Referees: Mila Čavara (BIH), Mathieu Hosselet (FRA), Zoltán Palla (HUN)

9 August 2017
20:15

Boxscore

Belgium	58–55	Lithuania
Scoring by quarter: 20–9, 13–20, 10–12, 15–14
Pts: Devos 13; Rebs: Bi. Massey 14; Asts: Be. Massey 4		Pts: Šegždaitė 13; Rebs: Šegždaitė 10; Asts: Tamutytė 5

Novomatic Aréna, Sopron
Referees: Manuel Mazzoni (ITA), Anton Makhlin (RUS), Bernard Vassallo (MLT)

=== 9th–16th place quarterfinals ===
10 August 2017
13:00

Boxscore

Turkey	44–84	Russia
Scoring by quarter: 11–22, 8–26, 8–20, 17–17
Pts: Yıldızhan 11; Rebs: Güner, Yıldızhan 5 Asts: Taşar, Yıldızhan 2		Pts: Antoshina 15; Rebs: Ignatova 9 Asts: Safonova 6

Novomatic Aréna II, Sopron
Referees: Mykola Ambrosov (UKR), Mathieu Hosselet (FRA), Gellért Kapitány (HUN)

10 August 2017
15:15

Boxscore

Greece	65–80	Bosnia and Herzegovina
Scoring by quarter: 18–18, 20–18, 18–18, 9–26
Pts: E. Tsineke 26; Rebs: Kouki 7 Asts: E. Tsineke 4		Pts: Visković 19; Rebs: Heljić 10; Asts: Visković 7

Novomatic Aréna II, Sopron
Referees: Bernard Vassallo (MLT), Tamás Földházi (HUN), Gavin Williams (WAL)

10 August 2017
17:30

Boxscore

Croatia	69–67	Lithuania
Scoring by quarter: 25–13, 17–15, 14–18, 13–21
Pts: Katavić 21; Rebs: Kostić 7 Asts: Kostić 5		Pts: Donskichytė 20; Rebs: Tamutytė 7 Asts: Donskichytė 4

Novomatic Aréna II, Sopron
Referees: Tamás Benczúr (HUN), Igor Esteve Malmierca (AND), Zdenko Zubak (SVK)

10 August 2017
19:45

Boxscore

Latvia	57–82	Italy
Scoring by quarter: 12–12, 11–22, 19–23, 15–25
Pts: Rozentāle 12; Rebs: Gulbe 9 Asts: three players 2		Pts: Madera 15; Rebs: Madera, Trucco 7 Asts: Verona 4

Novomatic Aréna II, Sopron
Referees: Anastasios Manos (GRE), Zoltán Palla (HUN), Volodymyr Pediev (UKR)

=== Quarterfinals ===
10 August 2017
13:30

Boxscore

Spain	45–51	France
Scoring by quarter: 10–10, 13–10, 10–18, 12–13
Pts: Ayuso, Junio 10; Rebs: L. Rodríguez 6 Asts: González 3		Pts: Pouye 12; Rebs: Sissoko 9 Asts: Mbandu 4

Novomatic Aréna, Sopron
Referees: Jasmina Juras (SRB), Manuel Mazzoni (ITA), Pedro Alfonso Vásquez González (CHI)

10 August 2017
15:45

Boxscore

Sweden	43–71	Czech Republic
Scoring by quarter: 9–21, 5–17, 14–14, 15–19
Pts: Lundquist 13; Rebs: Lundquist 8 Asts: Lundquist 4		Pts: Vitulová 16; Rebs: Kopecká 11; Asts: Brabencová, Voráčková 4

Novomatic Aréna, Sopron
Referees: Tomas Jasevičius (LTU), Mila Čavara (BIH), Sarty Nghixulifwa (NAM)

10 August 2017
18:00

Boxscore

Hungary	56–59	Belgium
Scoring by quarter: 10–17, 12–16, 17–18, 17–8
Pts: Kanyasi 16; Rebs: Gereben 9 Asts: Gereben 3		Pts: Vervaet 23; Rebs: Bi. Massey 14; Asts: Vervaet 3

Novomatic Aréna, Sopron
Referees: Alexey Davydov (RUS), Ivana Ivanović (SRB), Zafer Yılmaz (TUR)

10 August 2017
20:15

Boxscore

Serbia	74–63	Slovenia
Scoring by quarter: 15–13, 18–20, 24–17, 17–13
Pts: Raca 16; Rebs: Đorđević 10; Asts: Đorđević 10		Pts: Krošelj 18; Rebs: Goršič 8 Asts: Friškovec 8

Novomatic Aréna, Sopron
Referees: Arnis Ozols (LAT), Anton Makhlin (RUS), Nikola Perlić (CRO)

=== 13th–16th place semifinals ===
12 August 2017
13:00

Boxscore

Turkey	63–67	Latvia
Scoring by quarter: 13–11, 11–15, 12–18, 27–23
Pts: Güner 21; Rebs: Yıldızhan 15; Asts: Güner 4		Pts: Kļaviņa 17; Rebs: Rozentāle 7 Asts: Ozola 5

Novomatic Aréna II, Sopron
Referees: Tamás Benczur (HUN), Anton Makhlin (RUS), Volodymyr Pediev (UKR)

12 August 2017
15:15

Boxscore

Greece	57–96	Lithuania
Scoring by quarter: 13–25, 10–19, 19–24, 15–28
Pts: E. Tsineke 17; Rebs: Anastasopoulou 5 Asts: E. Tsineke 5		Pts: Kazočiūnaitė 19; Rebs: Tamutytė 10; Asts: Tamutytė 5

Novomatic Aréna II, Sopron
Referees: Mathieu Hosselet (FRA), Mykola Ambrosov (UKR), Tamás Földházi (HUN)

=== 9th–12th place semifinals ===
12 August 2017
17:30

Boxscore

Russia	62–71	Italy
Scoring by quarter: 16–20, 18–9, 17–21, 11–21
Pts: Zaitceva 13; Rebs: Kosulnikova 11; Asts: Dinza Ernandes 3		Pts: Fassina 19; Rebs: Fassina 8 Asts: Cubaj, Fassina 4

Novomatic Aréna II, Sopron
Referees: Jasmina Juras (SRB), Igor Esteve Malmierca (AND), Sarty Nghixulifwa (NAM)

12 August 2017
19:45

Boxscore

Bosnia and Herzegovina	52–80	Croatia
Scoring by quarter: 4–12, 14–28, 23–24, 11–16
Pts: Visković 16; Rebs: Heljić, Perić 7 Asts: Azinović, Mitrić 3		Pts: Erjavec 22; Rebs: Katavić 8 Asts: three players 4

Novomatic Aréna II, Sopron
Referees: Pedro Alfonso Vásquez González (CHI), Volodymyr Pediev (UKR), Gavin Williams (WAL)

=== 5th–8th place semifinals ===
12 August 2017
13:30

Boxscore

Spain	63–62	Slovenia
Scoring by quarter: 12–13, 14–14, 18–10, 19–25
Pts: Junio 22; Rebs: Junio 14; Asts: González 8		Pts: Kenda 15; Rebs: Goršič 10; Asts: Friškovec 5

Novomatic Aréna, Sopron
Referees: Arnis Ozols (LAT), Ivana Ivanović (SRB), Pedro Alfonso Vásquez González (CHI)

12 August 2017
15:45

Boxscore

Sweden	43–59	Hungary
Scoring by quarter: 13–13, 12–13, 9–10, 9–23
Pts: Lundquist 19; Rebs: Lundquist 12; Asts: Lundquist 2		Pts: Gereben 16; Rebs: Gereben 14; Asts: Lelik 8

Novomatic Aréna, Sopron
Referees: Nikola Perlić (CRO), Anastasios Manos (GRE), Zdenko Zubak (SVK)

=== Semifinals ===
12 August 2017
18:00

Boxscore

Czech Republic	49–63	Belgium
Scoring by quarter: 16–8, 7–20, 14–16, 12–19
Pts: Vitulová, Voráčková 12; Rebs: Voráčková 13; Asts: Voráčková 5		Pts: Devos 17; Rebs: Bi. Massey 16; Asts: Vervaet 6

Novomatic Aréna, Sopron
Referees: Alexey Davydov (RUS), Manuel Mazzoni (ITA), Bernard Vassallo (MLT)

12 August 2017
20:15

Boxscore

France	48–66	Serbia
Scoring by quarter: 15–14, 11–11, 17–14, 5–27
Pts: Pouye 19; Rebs: Fofana 8 Asts: three players 3		Pts: Katanić 22; Rebs: Katanić 8 Asts: Katanić 9

Novomatic Aréna, Sopron
Referees: Tomas Jasevičius (LTU), Mila Čavara (BIH), Zafer Yılmaz (TUR)

=== 15th place game ===
13 August 2017
11:00

Boxscore

Turkey	71–62	Greece
Scoring by quarter: 19–14, 14–19, 27–17, 11–12
Pts: Güner 31; Rebs: Güner 17; Asts: Yıldızhan 8		Pts: E. Tsineke 23; Rebs: A. Tsineke 7 Asts: Prapa 6

Novomatic Aréna II, Sopron
Referees: Zdenko Zubak (SVK), Gellért Kapitány (HUN), Sarty Nghixulifwa (NAM)

=== 13th place game ===
13 August 2017
13:15

Boxscore

Latvia	81–72	Lithuania
Scoring by quarter: 18–20, 19–16, 29–14, 15–22
Pts: Rozentāle 20; Rebs: Rozentāle 18; Asts: Ozola 4		Pts: Masionytė 15; Rebs: Sakevičiūtė 10; Asts: Serkevičiūtė 4

Novomatic Aréna II, Sopron
Referees: Alexey Davydov (RUS), Ivana Ivanović (SRB), Zafer Yılmaz (TUR)

=== 11th place game ===
13 August 2017
15:30

Boxscore

Russia	90–73	Bosnia and Herzegovina
Scoring by quarter: 15–19, 26–12, 17–27, 32–15
Pts: Repnikova 19; Rebs: Zaitceva 9 Asts: three players 4		Pts: Heljić 21; Rebs: Heljić 11; Asts: Visković 4

Novomatic Aréna II, Sopron
Referees: Tamás Benczur (HUN), Volodymyr Pediev (UKR), Gavin Williams (WAL)

=== 9th place game ===
13 August 2017
17:45

Boxscore

Italy	63–71	Croatia
Scoring by quarter: 16–15, 9–18, 13–18, 25–20
Pts: Cubaj 20; Rebs: Cubaj 9 Asts: Fassina 5		Pts: Erjavec 23; Rebs: Kostić 9 Asts: Kostić 9

Novomatic Aréna II, Sopron
Referees: Anastasios Manos (GRE), Gellért Kapitány (HUN), Pedro Alfonso Vásquez González (CHI)

=== 7th place game ===
13 August 2017
13:30

Boxscore

Slovenia	70–67	Sweden
Scoring by quarter: 19–18, 15–16, 14–11, 22–22
Pts: Goršič 17; Rebs: Friškovec 7 Asts: Krošelj 7		Pts: Lundquist 34; Rebs: Lundquist 10; Asts: Lundquist 4

Novomatic Aréna, Sopron
Referees: Anton Makhlin (RUS), Igor Esteve Malmierca (AND), Tamás Földházi (HUN)

=== 5th place game ===
13 August 2017
15:45

Boxscore

Spain	55–74	Hungary
Scoring by quarter: 11–20, 12–24, 12–18, 20–12
Pts: Junio 14; Rebs: Junio 11; Asts: Camilion, Prieto 3		Pts: Mérész 18; Rebs: three players 6 Asts: Lelik 8

Novomatic Aréna, Sopron
Referees: Bernard Vassallo (MLT), Mykola Ambrosov (UKR), Mila Čavara (BIH)

=== Bronze medal game ===
13 August 2017
18:00

Boxscore

France	55–48	Czech Republic
Scoring by quarter: 21–12, 11–11, 11–16, 12–9
Pts: Sissoko 17; Rebs: Sissoko 9 Asts: Pouye 4		Pts: Vitulová 14; Rebs: Vitulová 8 Asts: Brabencová 5

Novomatic Aréna, Sopron
Referees: Jasmina Juras (SRB), Manuel Mazzoni (ITA), Arnis Ozols (LAT)

=== Final ===
13 August 2017
20:15

Boxscore

Serbia	53–55	Belgium
Scoring by quarter: 13–11, 3–22, 20–8, 17–14
Pts: Raca 18; Rebs: Đorđević, Turudić 7 Asts: Dimitrijević 5		Pts: Vervaet 16; Rebs: Bi. Massey 13; Asts: three players 3

Novomatic Aréna, Sopron
Referees: Tomas Jasevičius (LTU), Mathieu Hosselet (FRA), Nikola Perlić (CRO)

== Final standings ==
Rank	Team	Record
1st place, gold medalist(s)	Belgium	6–1
2nd place, silver medalist(s)	Serbia	4–3
3rd place, bronze medalist(s)	France	5–2
4	Czech Republic	5–2
5	Hungary	6–1
6	Spain	5–2
7	Slovenia	3–4
8	Sweden	3–4
9	Croatia	3–4
10	Italy	4–3
11	Russia	3–4
12	Bosnia and Herzegovina	1–6
13	Latvia	4–3
14	Lithuania	2–5
15	Turkey	1–6
16	Greece	1–6

Relegated to the 2018 FIBA U18 Women's European Championship Division B

== Awards ==
2017 FIBA Europe Under-18 Championship for Women
Winners

Belgium
Second title

Most Valuable Player
(Belgium) Billie Massey

=== All-Tournament Team ===
- (Sweden) Klara Lundquist
- (Serbia) Ivana Katanić
- (France) Kadiatou Sissoko
- (Czech Republic) Veronika Voráčková
- (Belgium) Billie Massey
