= Marie Vervaet =

Belgian basketball player (born 2000)

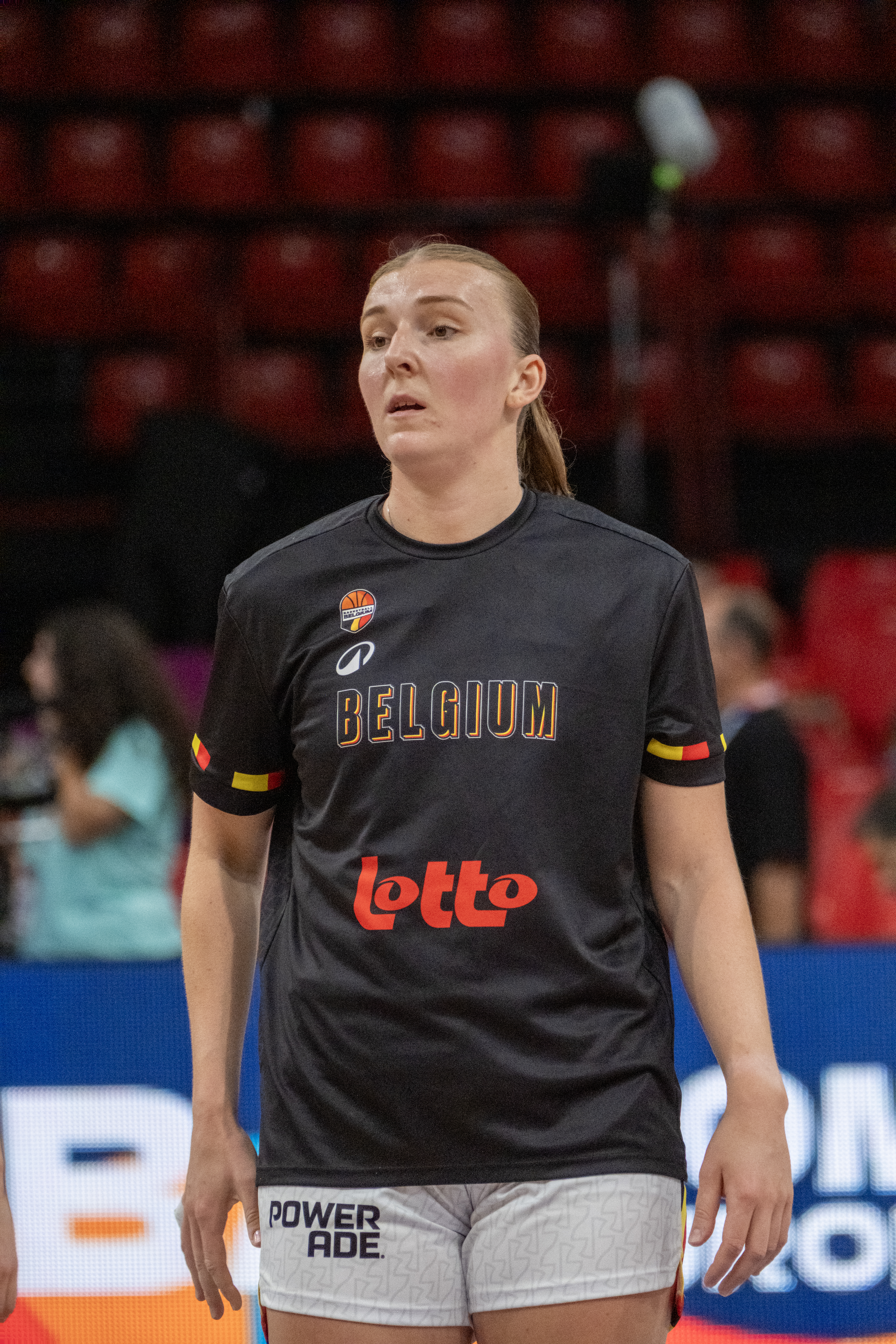
- Vervaet with Belgium during 2025 EuroBasket

Personal information
- Born: 29 February 2000 (age 26)

Career history
- 2014–21: Sint-Katelijne-Waver
- 2021–2022: Kangoeroes Mechelen
- 2022–23: Kortrijk Spurs
- 2023–: Castors Braine

Career highlights
- Belgian League: 2025; Belgian Cup: 2025

Marie Vervaet (born 29 February 2000) is a Belgian basketball player who plays for Castors Braine of the Belgian League and EuroLeague Women. Standing at 1.86 m (6 ft 1 in), she plays in the small forward position. She also plays for the Belgium national team and has also played for its 3x3 national team.

== Professional career ==
Vervaet is from Vilvoorde. She played for BC Sint-Katelijne-Waver (2014–2021), Kangoeroes Mechelen (2021–2022), and Kortrijk Spurs (2022–2023). Since 2023, she has been playing for Castors Braine. In 2025, she won the double with the Walloon club: both the Belgian championship and the Belgian Cup. She was personally voted Belgian Player of the Year.

== National team career ==
Vervaet played for the national youth teams at the U16, U18, and U19 levels. She participated in several European Championships, the highlight being the gold medal with the U18 team in Sopron, Hungary in 2017. A year later, she finished fourth with the U19 team at the World Cup in Thailand.

In 2021, Vervaet participated with the 3x3 national team in the 3x3 Europe Cup in Paris, along with Lut De Meyer, Becky Massey, and Laure Résimont. They were unable to win a match in France.

In 2025, Vervaet was selected by national coach Mike Thibault for the senior basketball team for the EuroBasket. The Belgian Cats won the European Championship title.

== Honours and awards ==
=== Club ===
==== Castors Braine ====
- Belgian League: 2024–25
- Belgian Cup: 2024–25

=== National team ===
- EuroBasket Women: (gold) 2025
- Belgian Sports team of the Year: 2025

=== Individual ===
- Belgian Player of the Year: 2025
