= Sarah Sagerer =

Austrian basketball player (1996-)

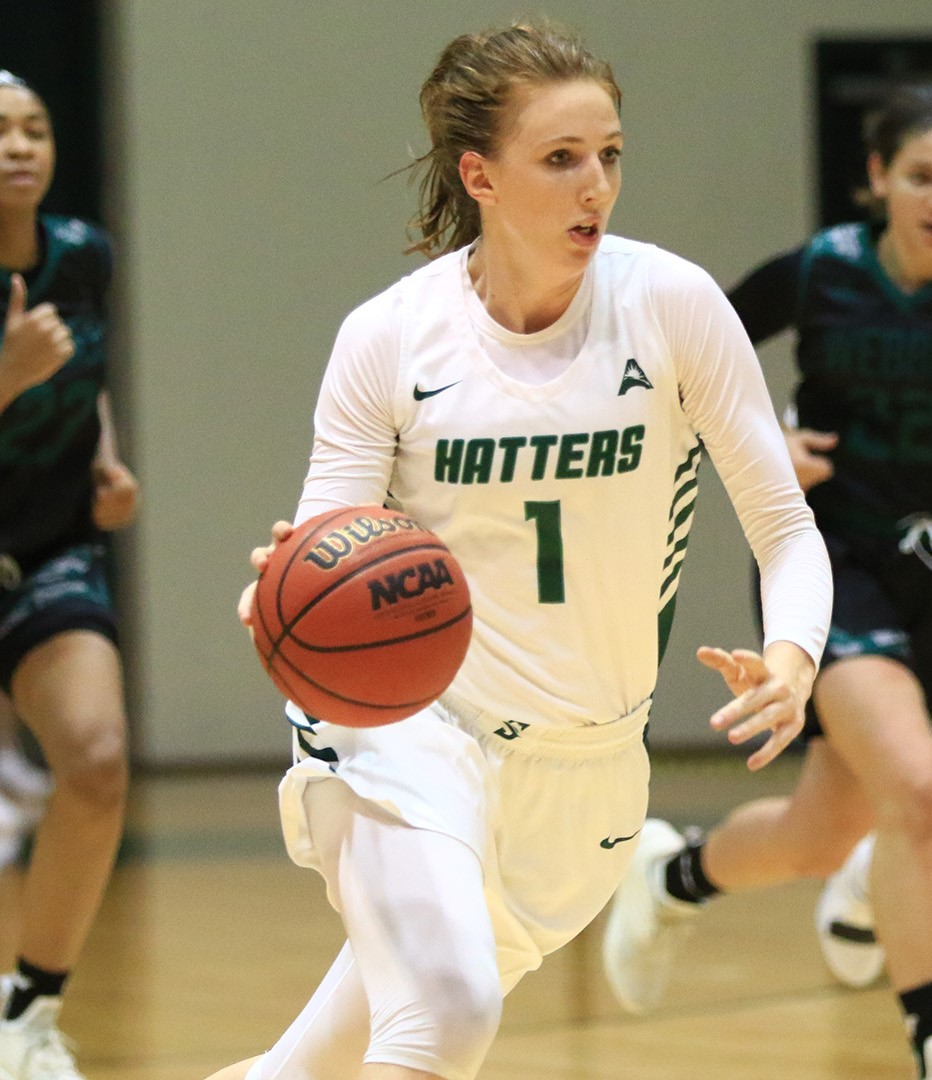

Personal information
- Born: February 8, 1996 (age 30) Schörfling am Attersee, Austria
- Listed height: 6 ft 3 in (1.91 m)

Career information
- High school: ORG Vöcklabruck (Austria) (2010–2012); Olentangy Orange (Lewis Center, Ohio) (2012–2013); Faith Baptist (Brandon, Florida) (2013); The Rock School (Gainesville, Florida) (2013–2014)
- College: Stetson University (2014–2019)
- Position: Forward
- Number: 1

Career history
- 2020: CD Zamarat
- 2020–2021: Energa Toruń
- 2021–2022: Zagłębie Sosnowiec
- 2022: Virtus Segafredo Bologna
- 2022–2023: Akronos Tech Moncalieri
- 2023: Tauranga Whai
- 2024: Hapoel Petah Tikva
- 2024: Flammes Carolo Basket
- 2025: TTT Riga
- 2025: Energa Toruń
- 2021-present: Austria National Team

Sarah Sagerer (born February 8, 1996) is an Austrian women's basketball player, who competed as a player for Stetson University in the NCAA Division I and currently pursues a professional career.

== Early life ==
Sagerer grew up in Schörfling am Attersee with her parents Adelheid and Georg and sister Dagmar. She started playing for the club SK Kammer at the age of 12 because of her seven years older sister Dagmar, who also is her role model.

== High school ==
As a junior, Sagerer decided to do an exchange year at Olentangy Orange High School, where the team ended up winning their first "District Championship" and played at the "Ohio State Semifinals", where they lost to the two-time defending State Champion team Twinsburg High School.

As a senior, she averaged 14.4 points, 10.2 rebounds, 1.8 steals, and 1.8 block-per-game at The Rock School in Gainesville, Florida.

== College career ==
In 2014–15, she was named Atlantic Sun All Freshman-Team. When Sagerer had her first career start, she scored 23 points, 18 rebounds, and 5 blocks, which helped her earn Atlantic Sun Newcomer of the Week and Swish Appeal Mid-Major co-Performance of the Night.

In 2015–16, the native Austrian had a slow start due to sickness. She ended up finishing the season strong by earning Atlantic Sun All-Tournament team.

In 2016–17, Sagerer helped the team to earn its first Conference Regular Season Championship. She earned Atlantic Defensive Player of the Year and was selected Atlantic Sun First Team All-Conference. Sagerer was ranked 1st in blocks, rebounds, and defensive rebounding in the ASUN Conference. She was ranked 7th in the National Collegiate Athletic Association in blocks.

In 2017–18, she redshirted due a back injury that she fully recovered from. Additionally, she finished her bachelor's degree in Business Administration and minor in Entrepreneurship.

In 2018–19, Sagerer was honored with the ASUN Preseason Player of the Year and ASUN Defensive Player of the Year. In addition to averaging 15.0 points, 7.8 rebounds, and 2.6 blocks, she received her master's degree in business administration. She played 28.1 minutes a game, and received other honors such as Challenge in Music City All-Tournament Teamand Hatter Classic All-Tournament Team. Furthermore, she become Stetson University's all-time blocks leader on January 4, 2019. Additionally, she was ranked 15th in the NCAA in blocks-per-game, while playing the 15th-toughest schedule in the nation. Unfortunately, she had a season-ending injury on January 8, 2019. In 2020–21, Sagerer played for Energa Torun the first league in Poland. After sitting out for a long time, she still was able to prove her talents in the league. She ended up being ranked third in blocks, eighth in rebounds and twelfth in points. Sagerer averaged 16.6 points and 7.2 rebounds.

== International ==
Sagerer competes for the Austria women's national basketball team.

=== U18 ===
At the FIBA U18 European Championship Div. B, Sarah Sagerer led the team in points, rebounds, and blocks. She averaged 13.7 points, 10.4 rebounds, and 3.6 blocks-per-game.

=== 3x3 Basketball ===
In 2011, Sagerer competed for the 3x3 U18 Austrian women's team at the first FIBA 3x3 Under-18 World Championships in Italy.

In 2017, she competed for the Austrian 3x3 women's national team to be part of the 2017 FIBA 3x3 Europe Cup qualifier. The team did not qualify after a one-point loss against France.

In 2021, Sagerer competed for the Austrian 3x3 national team at the Olympic Qualifier in Graz. After beating Switzerland, Chinese Taipei, and Italy, which was the world champion in the year 2018, the team still did not make it to the next round.

At the 2023 FIBA 3×3 World Cup in Vienna, the Austrian women's 3×3 team finished in 7th place, with Sarah Sagerer leading the team in scoring.

==== EuroBasket ====
During the EuroBasket 2025 qualification campaign, Sagerer was a key player for the Austrian women's national team, consistently leading the team in scoring and providing leadership on the court. Her performances helped raise the team's overall competitiveness and earned her recognition as Austria's most valuable player in the qualifiers.

== Professional career ==
Sagerer began her professional career in 2020 with Spanish club CD Zamarat in the Liga Femenina de Baloncesto, Spain's top league. Later in 2020 she moved to Poland to play for Energa Toruń in the EBLK. She then joined Zagłębie Sosnowiec for the 2021–22 season. In 2022 she moved to Italy's Serie A1, signing with Virtus Segafredo Bologna. She remained in Italy for the 2022–23 season with Akronos Tech Moncalieri. In 2023 she played for Whai in New Zealand's Tauihi Basketball Aotearoa league. In 2024 she moved to Israel to play for Hapoel Petah Tikva in the Ligat Ha’Al Nashim. Later in 2024 she joined Flammes Carolo Basket in France's LFB. In 2025 she signed with TTT Riga in the Latvian–Estonian Women's Basketball League. Later in 2025 she returned to Poland, re‑joining Energa Toruń.
