= Whai =

Whai may refer to:

- Tauranga Whai, New Zealand basketball team based in Tauranga, Bay of Plenty
- Whai, Māori string games
- Whai Ngata (c. 1942 – 2016), Māori broadcaster, journalist, and lexicographer
- WHAI, radio station in Greenfield, Massachusetts, U.S.
- WHAI-TV, television station now known as WZME in Bridgeport, Connecticut, U.S.
