= İlayda Güner =

Turkish basketball player

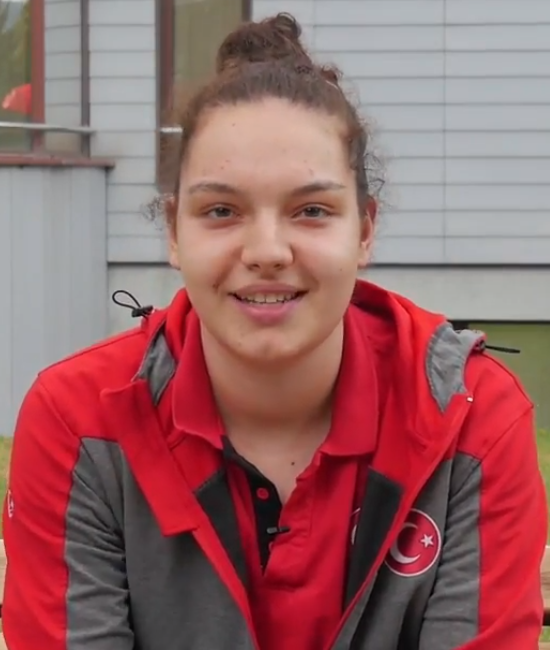
- Güner in 2018

No. 28 – Beşiktaş
- Position: Center
- League: Turkish Super League

Personal information
- Born: 5 November 1999 (age 27) Güngören, Turkey
- Listed height: 6 ft 4 in (1.93 m)

Career information
- Playing career: 2015–present

Career history
- 2015–2019: İstanbul Üniversitesi
- 2019–2021: Çukurova Basketbol
- 2021–present: Beşiktaş

İlayda Güner (born 5 November 1999) is a Turkish basketball player for Beşiktaş and the Turkish national team.

She participated at the 2018 FIBA Women's Basketball World Cup.
