= Kate Krēsliņa =

Latvian basketball player

Kate Vilka
No. 35 – TTT Riga
- Position: Small forward
- League: LSBL

Personal information
- Born: 14 April 1996 (age 30) Riga, Latvia
- Listed height: 6 ft 0 in (1.83 m)
- Listed weight: 165 lb (75 kg)

Career information
- College: Fordham Rams (2017)
- WNBA draft: 2018: undrafted

Career history
- 2017–2020: TTT Riga
- 2020–2021: BC Castors Braine
- 2022–2023: TTT Riga
- 2023–: Charnay Basket Bourgogne Sud

Kate Karlīna Vilka (née Krēsliņa, born 14 April 1996) is a Latvian basketball player for Fordham Rams and the Latvian national team.

She participated at the EuroBasket Women 2017.
