= Billie Massey =

Belgian basketball player

Club Balonesco Jairis
- Position: Center
- League: BNXT

Personal information
- Born: 21 March 2000 (age 26) Ostend, Belgium
- Listed height: 1.86 m (6 ft 1 in)

Career history
- 2016–20: BBC Wavre-Sainte-Catherine
- 2020–22: Kangoeroes Mechelen
- 2022–24: Estudiantes Madrid
- 2024–: Club Baloncesto Jairis

Billie Massey (born 21 March 2000) is a Belgian basketball player. She was part of the Belgian team in the women's tournament at the 2020 Summer Olympics and the EuroBasket Women 2023, which the Belgian Cats won.

Although she was a regular, she decided to put her career with Belgium on hold for personal reasons at the end of December 2024, before returning to the team in late 2025.

== Honours ==
=== National team ===
- FIBA U18 Women's EuroBasket (gold) 2017
- EuroBasket Women: (gold) 2023, (bronze) 2021
- Belgian Sports team of the Year: 2020, 2023

=== Individual ===
- FIBA U18 Women's EuroBasket MVP: 2017
- FIBA U18 Women's EuroBasket Top rebounds: 2017
- FIBA U19 Women's Basketball World Cup All-Tournament Team: 2019
- FIBA U20 Women's EuroBasket Top rebounds: 2019
- FIBA U20 Women's EuroBasket All-Tournament Team: 2019
- Top Division Women 1 MVP: 2019–20
