= Klara Holm =

French basketball player

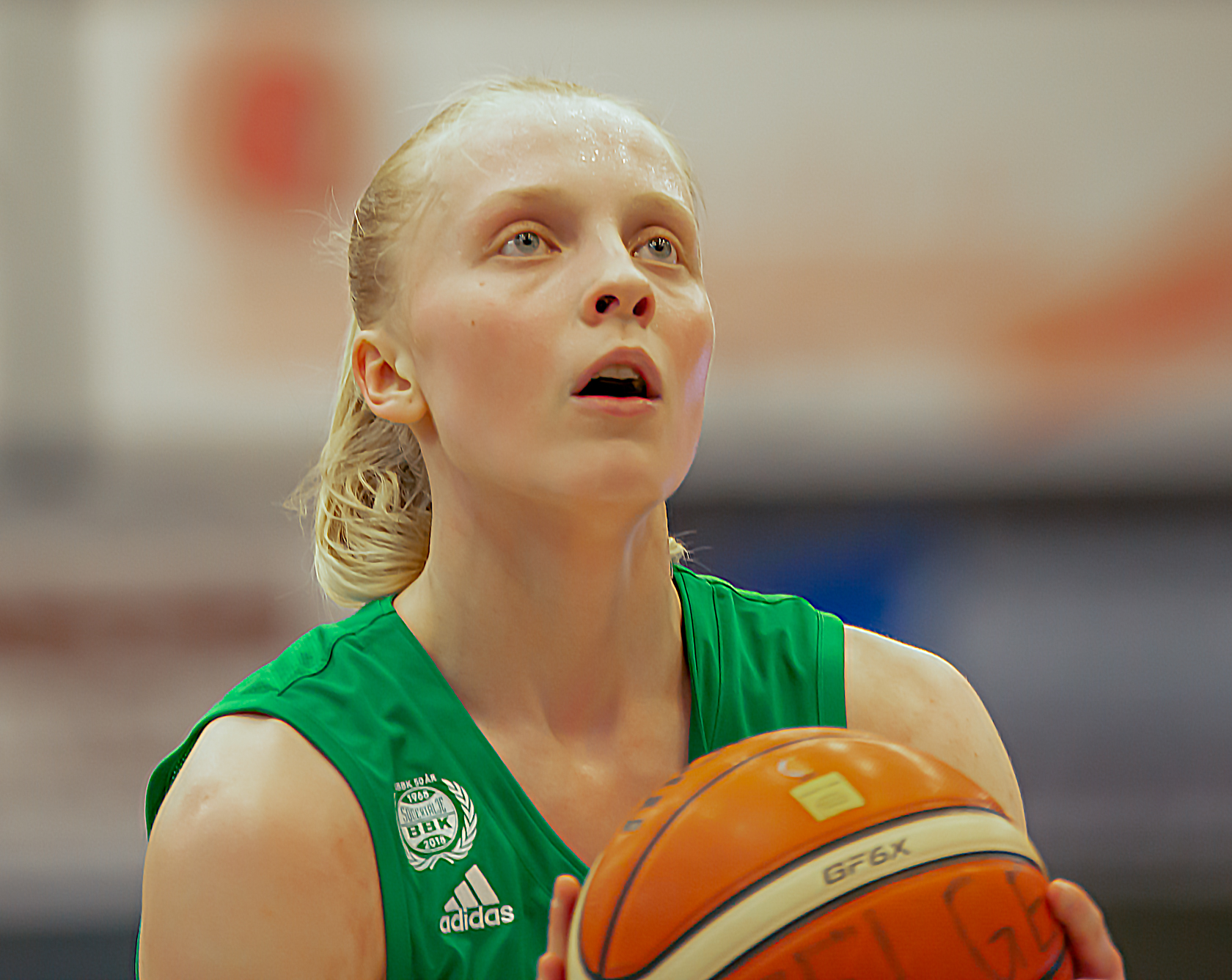
- Holm in 2019

No. 5 – Uni Girona
- Position: Point guard
- League: Liga Femenina

Personal information
- Born: 28 August 1999 (age 27) Stockholm, Sweden
- Listed height: 5 ft 8 in (1.73 m)

Career history
- 2015–2018: Alviks
- 2018–2019: Telge Basket
- 2019: BLMA
- 2020–2021: Alviks
- 2021–2022: Arka Gdynia
- 2021–2024: Södertälje
- 2024–present: Uni Girona
- Stats at Basketball Reference

Klara Maria Susanne Holm (née Lundquist, born 28 August 1999) is a Swedish professional basketball player for Uni Girona.

== Career ==
Born into a family of basketball players, Holm has practiced the sport from a very young age. She began her career with the Alviks and, in 2018, signed with Telge Basket, where she recorded three games with 32 points, while also occasionally contributing strongly in rebounding and playmaking.

In the 2018–19 EuroCup Women season, she averaged 20.8 points, 5.8 rebounds, and 2.6 assists when she was 19 yeears old, performances that convinced the French club Montpellier to sign her for the 2019–2020 LFB season.

Affected by homesickness and the distance from her relatives, she left BLMA at the end of November, having averaged 4.5 points and 1.8 rebounds in LFB, and 3.8 points along with 1.5 rebounds in the EuroLeague..

== National team ==
She was named to the All-Star Five of the 2017 FIBA U18 European Championship, where she finished as the tournament's leading scorer and third-leading rebounder, while Sweden placed eighth.

She was subsequently selected to the Sweden senior national team for the EuroBasket Women tournaments in 2019, 2021, and 2025.
