= Mihaela Lazić =

Croatian basketball player

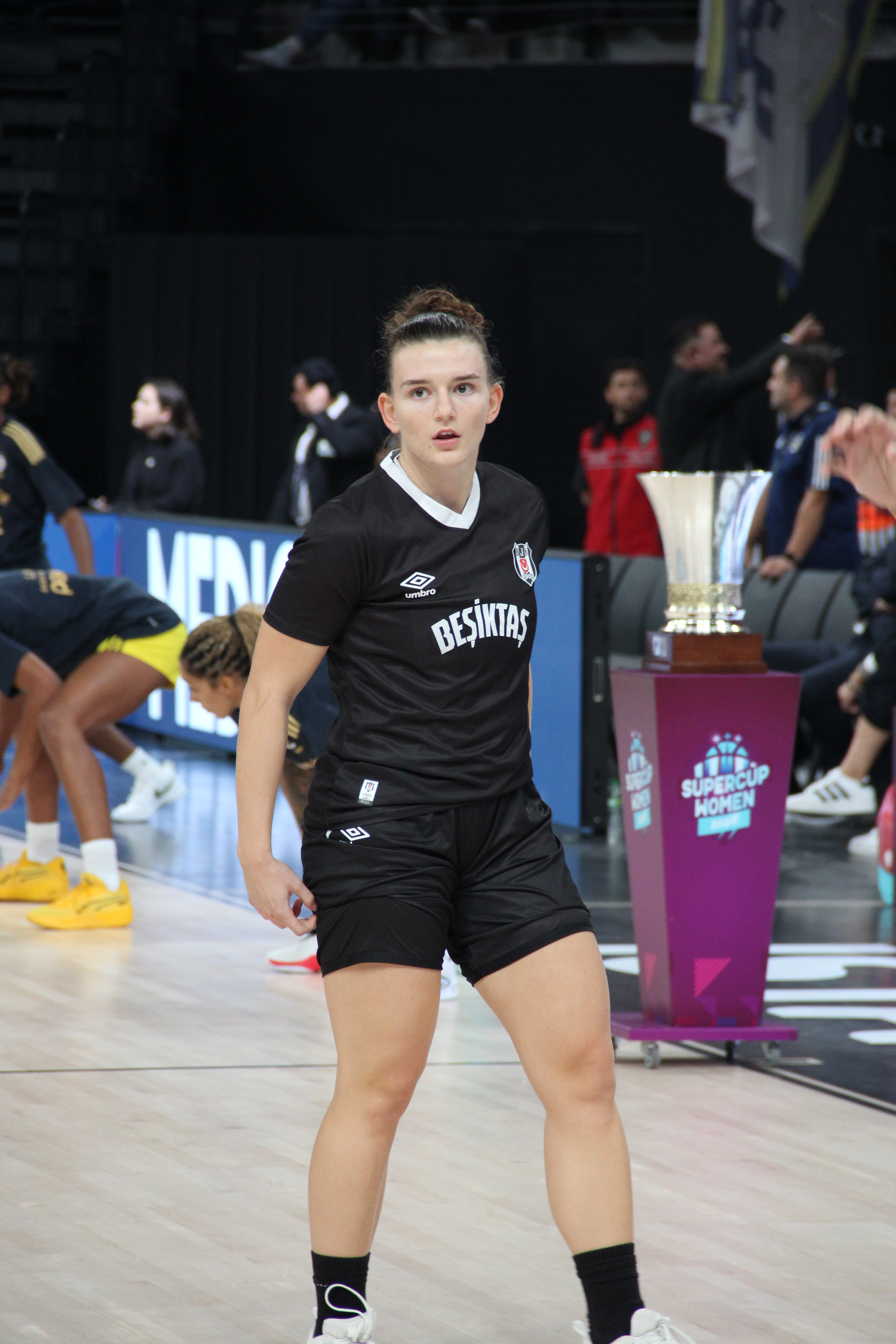

No. 0 – Beşiktaş
- Position: Point guard
- League: Turkish Super League

Personal information
- Born: 20 November 2000 (age 25) Slavonski Brod, Croatia
- Listed height: 1.68 m (5 ft 6 in)

Career information
- College: South Florida (2019-2022); FIU (2022-2023)
- Playing career: 2011–present

Career history
- 2011–2019: Brod na Savi
- 2023-present: Beşiktaş JK

Mihaela Lazić (born 20 November 2000 in Slavonski Brod, Croatia) is a Croatian female basketball player.

== College career ==
In 2019 Lazić joined the South Florida Bulls women's basketball team. Lazić would only play one game during the 2019-2020 due to a season-ending back injury.

== International career ==
Lazić competed in the 2018 European Championships.

== Professional career ==
On September 2, 2023, it was announced that Lazić would join Beşiktaş JK for the 2023–2024 season.
