= Becky Massey =

Belgian basketball player

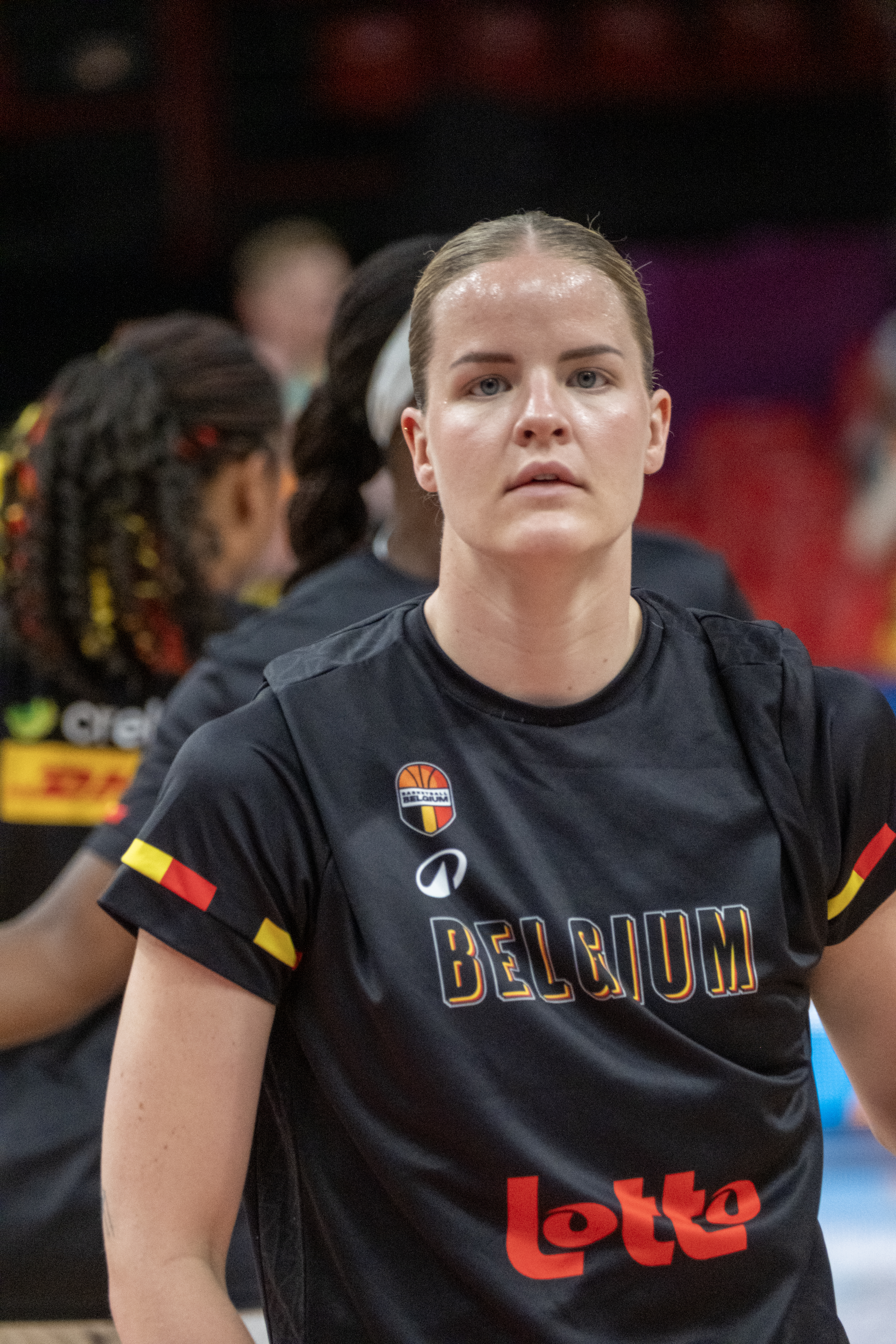
- Massey with Belgium during 2025 EuroBasket

Personal information
- Born: 21 March 2000 (age 26)
- Listed height: 1.86 m (6 ft 1 in)

Career history
- 2016–2021: Sint-Katelijne-Waver
- 2021–2022: Kangoeroes Basket Mechelen
- 2022–2023: Estudiantes Madrid
- 2023–2025: Club Deportivo Ibaeta
- 2025–: Basket Landes

Career highlights
- FIBA EuroBasket champion (2023, 2025)

Becky Erna Massey (born 21 March 2000) is a Belgian basketball player. She represented Belgium at the 2024 Summer Olympics. Massey was also part of the Belgian squad that won the EuroBasket Women 2023 and EuroBasket Women 2025 championship.

In May 2025, Masssey signed a contract with French reigning champion Basket Landes.

Becky Massey is the twin sister of Billie Massey.

== Honours ==
=== National team ===
- EuroBasket Women: (gold) 2023, 2025
- Belgian Sports team of the Year: 2023, 2025
