= Elena Tsineke =

Greek professional basketball player

No. 5 – Athinaikos AS Vournas
- Position: Combo guard

Personal information
- Born: July 11, 1999 (age 27) Thessaloniki, Greece
- Listed height: 5 ft 9 in (1.75 m)
- Listed weight: 166 lb (75 kg)

Career information
- College: South Florida (2019–2023)
- NBA draft: 2023: 2nd round, 20th overall pick
- Drafted by: Washington Mystics
- Playing career: 2023–present

Career history
- 2017–2025: Greece
- Stats at Basketball Reference

Elena Tsineke (Ελένα Τσινέκε; born July 11, 1999, in Thessaloniki, Greece) is a Greek professional basketball player who competes as a combo guard. She is best known for her tenure at the University of South Florida (USF), where she became one of the program's most decorated players, and for being selected as the 20th overall pick in the 2023 WNBA Draft by the Washington Mystics. Known for her aggressive play in the pick-and-roll, perimeter shooting, and full-court defensive pressure, Tsineke has spent much of her professional career in European leagues, most notably in Poland's top women's basketball circuit. She represented the Greek national team from 2017 to 2025.

== Early life and background ==
Elena Tsineke was born on July 11, 1999, in Thessaloniki, Greece's second-largest city. She is the daughter of Parthena Ketzetziadoy and Roland Soth Tsineke. Growing up in Greece, Tsineke developed her basketball skills at a young age, eventually joining the premier Greek club team Niki Lefkadas, where she averaged 14.7 points, 5.4 rebounds, 3.3 assists, and 2.4 steals per game, while shooting 80.2 percent from the free-throw line. Her standout performances in Greece attracted international attention and led to her recruitment to play college basketball in the United States.

== College career (2019–2023) ==
=== University of South Florida, Tampa ===
Tsineke enrolled at the University of South Florida (USF) in Tampa, where she played for the South Florida Bulls women's basketball program in the American Athletic Conference (AAC). Over four seasons, she became one of the most prominent players in program history.

==== Freshman season ====
In her debut season, Tsineke made an immediate impact, earning the AAC Freshman of the Year award and a spot on The American All-Freshman Team. She was also named to the AAC All-Conference Third Team, becoming only the third USF Bull in five seasons to earn AAC Freshman of the Year honors, following Tamara Henshaw (2017) and Kitija Laksa (2016).

==== Senior season (2022–23) ====
Her final college season was her most prolific. She set a season-high of 28 points against Cincinnati on March 1, shooting 10-for-14 (71.4%) from the field with five assists. She also scored 27 points twice against Temple — on January 19 and January 22 — earning her the AAC Player of the Week honor (January 24). During that stretch, she shot 44.7% from the field, 50.0% from three-point range, and 85.0% from the free-throw line. Tsineke concluded her college career as a WBCA All-American and graduated from USF in 2023.

==== College honors ====
- WBCA All-American
- AAC Freshman of the Year
- AAC All-Conference Third Team
- AAC All-Freshman Team
- AAC Player of the Week (January 24, 2023)

== Professional career ==
=== 2023 WNBA Draft – Washington Mystics ===
On April 17, 2023, Tsineke was selected by the Washington Mystics with the 20th overall pick (2nd round, 8th pick) in the 2023 WNBA Draft, becoming the highest-drafted USF player in program history. She participated in the team's Media Day on May 1, 2023, but was waived by the Mystics prior to the start of the regular season.

=== Poland – ENEA Gorzów (2023–2025) ===
Tsineke subsequently signed with PolskaStrefaInwestycji ENEA AJP Gorzów Wielkopolski in Poland's top women's basketball division. She became one of the team's focal points, earning recognition as the Polish Cup MVP and establishing herself as a consistent offensive force. In the 2024–25 EuroCup Women season, she averaged 15.5 points, 5.1 assists, 2.8 rebounds, and 1.8 steals per game. On October 9, 2024, she set career highs with 27 points and 11 assists in a road game against Levhartice Chomutov, shooting 8-for-11 from two-point range.

=== 2025 Las Vegas Aces training camp ===
On February 17, 2025, Tsineke signed a training camp contract with the Las Vegas Aces. She was waived on April 24, 2025, before the start of the 2025 WNBA season.

=== Return to Greece – Athinaikos AS Vournas ===
Following her release from the Aces, Tsineke returned to Greece, signing with Athinaikos AS Vournas in the Greek A1 league, the top tier of Greek women's basketball.

== Career statistics ==
Playoff appearance

=== Polish Women's Basketball League (PLKK) ===
Season	Team	GP	MPG	FG%	3P%	FT%	RPG	APG	PPG
2023–24	ENEA Gorzów	—	—	—	—	—	4.7	5.3	17.9
2024–25	ENEA Gorzów	22	—	53.4	39.7	81.1	3.0	4.6	17.0
2025–present	Athinaikos AS Vournas	—	—	—	—	—	—	—	—

=== EuroCup Women ===
Season	Team	GP	MPG	FG%	3P%	FT%	RPG	APG	PPG
2023–24	ENEA Gorzów	10	34.8	46.2	32.7	65.5	3.3	5.6	17.9
2024–25	ENEA Gorzów	8	29.0	57.6	35.7	81.8	2.8	5.1	15.5

WNBA: No regular season appearances recorded (Washington Mystics 2023, Las Vegas Aces 2025 — training camp only).

== International career ==
Tsineke represented the Greek national women's basketball team from 2017 to 2025, competing across multiple FIBA competitions. Her international career spanned both her college and professional years, cementing her role as one of Greece's premier guards during the period.

== Playing style ==
Described as a "new-age combo guard," Tsineke is characterized by her aggressive play in the pick-and-roll, three-point shooting efficiency, and relentless full-court defensive pressure. She excels at creating off the dribble and has demonstrated an ability to facilitate as a playmaker, as evidenced by her 11-assist performance in the 2024–25 EuroCup. Her free-throw shooting has been consistently elite throughout her career. She is widely regarded as an underrated prospect due to her limited WNBA opportunities despite strong overseas numbers.
