= 2024–25 Women's Baltic Basketball League =

European women's basketball tournament

Women's Baltic Basketball League
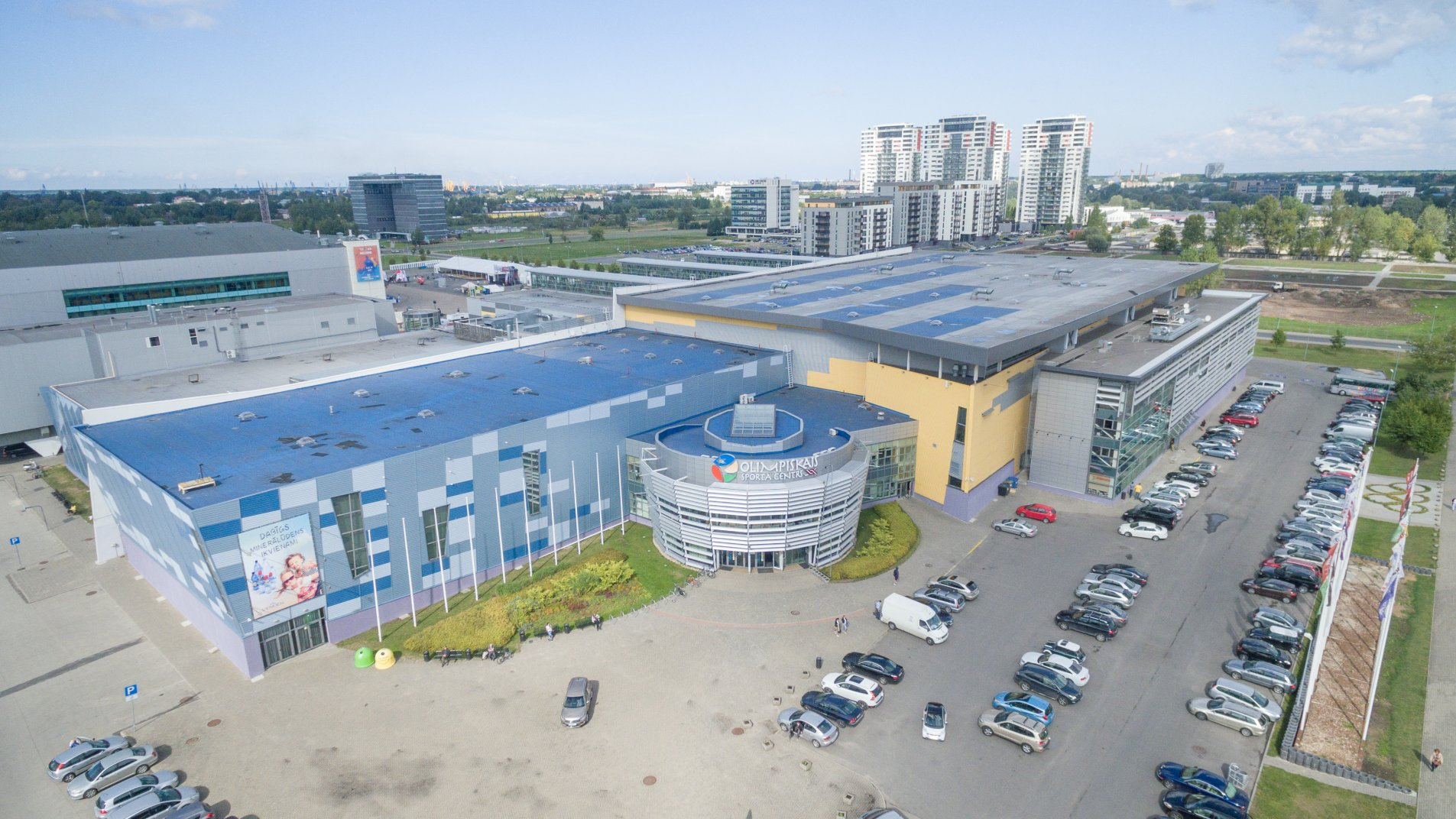
- The final four was held at the Rimi Olympic Centre in Riga, Latvia.
- Season: 2024–25
- Dates: Regular season: 29 September 2024 – 16 March 2025; Quarterfinals: 19–29 March 2025; Final four: 5–6 April 2025
- Teams: Total: 8 (from 3 countries)

Finals
- Champions: (Lithuania) Kibirkštis (2nd title)
- Runners-up: (Lithuania) BC Neptunas-Amberton
- Third place: (Latvia) TTT Riga
- Fourth place: (Lithuania) LCC International University

Statistical leaders
- Points: (United States) Mia Loyd (362 points)
- Rebounds: (United States) Mia Loyd (138 rebounds)
- Assists: (Estonia) Katlin Kangur (92 assists)

Records
- Biggest home win: Kibirkštis 111–44 RSU Riga (13 November 2024)
- Biggest away win: TSA/CITYTEED Tallinn 48–113 Kibirkštis (19 February 2025)
- Highest scoring: LCC International University 88–101 Kibirkštis (27 October 2024)

The 2024–25 Women's Baltic Basketball League (or the Biosil Women's Baltic Basketball League for sponsorship reasons) is the 31st season of this competition for the top women's teams in the Baltic region.

TTT Riga are the four-time defending champions.

The winners were Kibirkštis who defeated Lithuanian rivals, BC Neptunas-Amberton, in the final to secure their second title.

== Format ==
- Regular season

The eight teams all played in a double round robin system. Every team qualifies for the quarterfinals.

- Quarterfinals

All eight teams advanced to the quarterfinals which were played in a home and away format where the four aggregate winners advance to the final four.

- Final four

The four remaining teams advanced to the Final four to decide the champions. The Final four consisted of two semifinals, a third place game and the final.

== Teams ==
Location of teams in the 2024–25 Women's Baltic Basketball League

The labels in the parentheses show how each team qualified for the place of its starting round:

- 1st, 2nd, 3rd, etc.: League position of the previous season

Regular season
(Estonia) TSA/CITYTEED Tallinn (3rd)
(Latvia) TTT Riga (1st)
(Latvia) RSU Riga (2nd)
(Latvia) SBK Liepāja/LSSS (3rd)
(Lithuania) Kibirkštis (1st)
(Lithuania) LCC International University (2nd)
(Lithuania) BC Neptunas-Amberton (3rd)
(Lithuania) Šiauliai–Vilmers (4th)

== Regular season ==
Pos	Team	Pld	W	L	PF	PA	PD	Pts	Qualification	KIB	NEP	LCC	TTT	TAL	SIA	LIE	RSU
1	(Lithuania) Kibirkštis	14	14	0	1257	859	+398	28	Quarterfinals	—	78–65	79–69	80–65	92–45	81–64	85–64	111–44
2	(Lithuania) BC Neptunas-Amberton	14	12	2	1082	818	+264	26	Quarterfinals	63–78	—	75–69	80–64	97–52	91–76	79–33	91–47
3	(Lithuania) LCC International University	14	9	5	1095	857	+238	23	Quarterfinals	88–101	50–58	—	84–68	96–52	78–68	107–51	89–47
4	(Latvia) TTT Riga	14	8	6	1022	986	+36	22	Quarterfinals	67–87	75–85	81–69	—	88–74	86–72	78–73	72–60
5	(Estonia) TSA/CITYTEED Tallinn	14	6	8	871	1087	−216	20	Quarterfinals	48–113	63–83	55–95	61–57	—	83–69	80–54	48–44
6	(Lithuania) Šiauliai–Vilmers	14	4	10	991	1037	−46	18	Quarterfinals	47–86	59–64	71–77	64–75	66–80	—	88–54	78–35
7	(Latvia) SBK Liepāja/LSSS	14	2	12	794	1104	−310	16	Quarterfinals	74–91	41–71	51–104	49–72	62–69	82–84	—	61–54
8	(Latvia) RSU Riga	14	1	13	646	1010	−364	15	Quarterfinals	56–95	33–80	0–20 (Note: LCC International University were awarded a forfeit win over RSU Riga.)	48–74	71–61	65–85	42–45	—

Source: WBBL
Rules for classification: 1) Points; 2) Points difference; 3) Points scored.

== Quarterfinals ==
Team 1	Agg.	Team 2	1st leg	2nd leg
RSU Riga (Latvia)	96–205	(Lithuania) Kibirkštis	44–98	52–107
SBK Liepāja/LSSS (Latvia)	101–156	(Lithuania) BC Neptunas-Amberton	43–73	58–83
Šiauliai–Vilmers (Lithuania)	108–174	(Lithuania) LCC International University	48–97	60–77
TSA/CITYTEED Tallinn (Estonia)	118–166	(Latvia) TTT Riga	63–78	55–88

=== Matches ===
19 March 2025
19:00

Boxscore

RSU Riga (Latvia)	44–98	(Lithuania) Kibirkštis
Scoring by quarter: 13–25, 7–26, 10–19, 14–18
Pts: Pētersone 11; Rebs: Tomina 8 Asts: Šteinharde 4		Pts: Ūsė 20; Rebs: Ūsė 9 Asts: Miknaitė 9

Rimi Olympic Centre, Riga

29 March 2025
15:00

Boxscore

Kibirkštis (Lithuania)	107–52	(Latvia) RSU Riga
Scoring by quarter: 34–12, 26–12, 27–14, 20–14
Pts: Taylor 20; Rebs: Grigaliūnaitė 11; Asts: Aukštikalnytė 5		Pts: Tomina 20; Rebs: Pētersone 8 Asts: Šteinharde 3

Active Vilnius Arena, Vilnius
Attendance: 33

Kibirkštis won 205–96 on aggregate

20 March 2025
18:30

Boxscore

SBK Liepāja/LSSS (Latvia)	43–73	(Lithuania) BC Neptunas-Amberton
Scoring by quarter: 13–15, 8–15, 11–18, 11–25
Pts: Šmite 18; Rebs: Šmite 7 Asts: Trankale 1		Pts: Čižauskaitė 15; Rebs: Sinickaitė 10; Asts: Murray 5

Liepāja Olympic Center, Liepāja
Attendance: 150

22 March 2025

Boxscore

BC Neptunas-Amberton (Lithuania)	83–58	(Latvia) SBK Liepāja/LSSS
Scoring by quarter: 26–19, 20–13, 24–11, 13–15
Pts: Murray, Stipra 12; Rebs: Balaban, Čižauskaitė 7 Asts: Vilka 5		Pts: Šmite 20; Rebs: three players 6 Asts: Petrus 4

Klaipėdos Sporto Rūmai, Klaipėda
Attendance: 87

BC Neptunas-Amberton won 156–101 on aggregate

22 March 2025
19:30

Boxscore

Šiauliai–Vilmers (Lithuania)	48–97	(Lithuania) LCC International University
Scoring by quarter: 13–31, 15–17, 14–32, 6–17
Pts: Černeckytė 10; Rebs: Anderson 6 Asts: Aleksieva 3		Pts: Loceniece 23; Rebs: Dias 8 Asts: four players 4

Šiauliu Arena, Šiauliai
Attendance: 80

27 March 2025
19:00

Boxscore

LCC International University (Lithuania)	77–60	(Lithuania) Šiauliai–Vilmers
Scoring by quarter: 21–19, 20–16, 12–14, 24–11
Pts: Paliulytė 21; Rebs: Paliulytė 9 Asts: Paliulytė 5		Pts: Černeckytė 10; Rebs: Černeckytė, Sederevičiūtė 6 Asts: Černeckytė 6

Michealsen Centras, Klaipėda
Attendance: 150

LCC International University won 174–108 on aggregate

22 March 2025
15:00

Boxscore

TSA/CITYTEED Tallinn (Estonia)	63–78	(Latvia) TTT Riga
Scoring by quarter: 16–22, 18–, 19–19, 10–21
Pts: Kosareva 30; Rebs: Antonio 9 Asts: Kangur 7		Pts: Loyd 21; Rebs: Loyd 8 Asts: Wilson 5

Ring Sports Center, Tallinn
Attendance: 92

28 March 2025
18:00

Boxscore

TTT Riga (Latvia)	88–55	(Estonia) TSA/CITYTEED Tallinn
Scoring by quarter: 27–11, 19–16, 23–10, 19–18
Pts: Loyd 17; Rebs: Loyd 7 Asts: Loyd, Vihmane 5		Pts: Kosareva 22; Rebs: Antonio 8 Asts: Kangur 6

Rimi Olympic Centre, Riga

TTT Riga won 166–118 on aggregate

== Final four ==
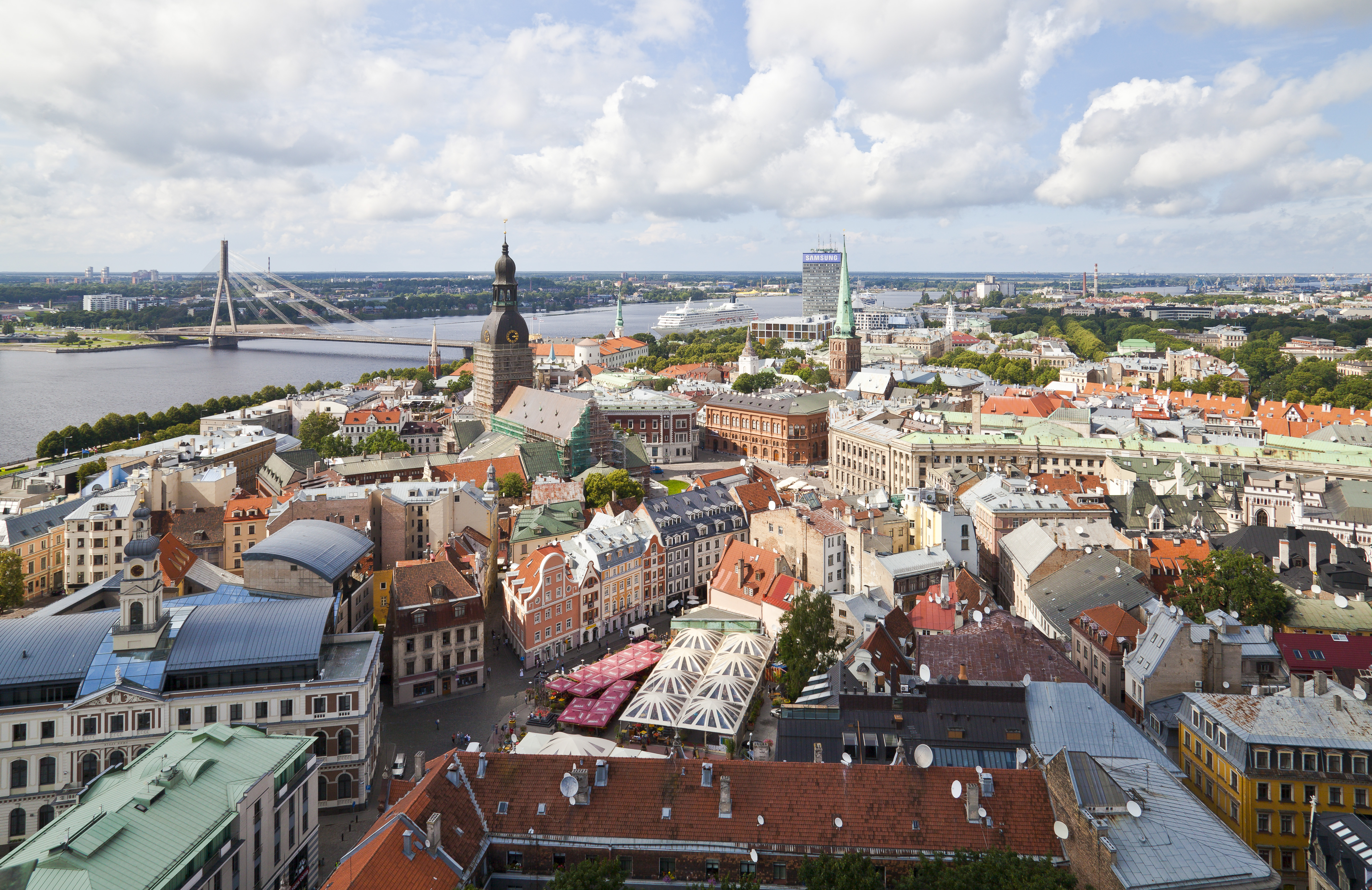
The Rimi Olympic Centre in Riga hosted the final four.

On 21 March 2025, Riga, Latvia was awarded the hosting rights of the Final four The Rimi Olympic Centre is the venue.

=== Bracket ===
Semifinals
(Lithuania) Kibirkštis	91
(Latvia) TTT Riga	75
(Lithuania) BC Neptunas-Amberton	88
(Lithuania) LCC International University	64

Final
(Lithuania) Kibirkštis	76
(Lithuania) BC Neptunas-Amberton	61
Third place
(Latvia) TTT Riga	78
(Lithuania) LCC International University	71

=== Semifinals ===
5 April 2025
15:00

Boxscore

Kibirkštis (Lithuania)	91–75	(Latvia) TTT Riga
Scoring by quarter: 27–15, 27–23, 10–26, 27–11
Pts: Taylor, Zabotkaitė 18; Rebs: Clouden, Ūsė 7 Asts: Clouden 7		Pts: Vihmane 22; Rebs: Pilabere 9 Asts: Jasa 7

Rimi Olympic Centre, Riga

5 April 2025
18:00

Boxscore

BC Neptunas-Amberton (Lithuania)	88–64	(Lithuania) LCC International University
Scoring by quarter: 12–13, 26–22, 30–10, 20–19
Pts: Šventoraitė 16; Rebs: Šventoraitė 8 Asts: Vilka 9		Pts: Dias 16; Rebs: Dias 10; Asts: Dias 5

Rimi Olympic Centre, Riga

=== Third place game ===
6 April 2025
12:30

Boxscore

TTT Riga (Latvia)	78–71	(Lithuania) LCC International University
Scoring by quarter: 23–22, 22–15, 25–12, 8–22
Pts: Vihmane 19; Rebs: Otto, Vihmane 7 Asts: Jasa 9		Pts: Raulušaitytė 21; Rebs: Raulušaitytė 9 Asts: Loceniece 5

Rimi Olympic Centre, Riga

=== Final ===
6 April 2025
15:30

Boxscore

Kibirkštis (Lithuania)	76–61	(Lithuania) BC Neptunas-Amberton
Scoring by quarter: 29–16, 13–18, 16–15, 18–12
Pts: Taylor 18; Rebs: Ūsė 11; Asts: Taylor 5		Pts: Sinickaitė 14; Rebs: Sinickaitė 5 Asts: Sinickaitė 5

Rimi Olympic Centre, Riga

2024–25 Women's Baltic Basketball League Champions

Kibirkštis
Second title

== See also ==
- 2024–25 Women's Baltic Basketball League Division B
