= Karina Yan Glaser =

American children's book author

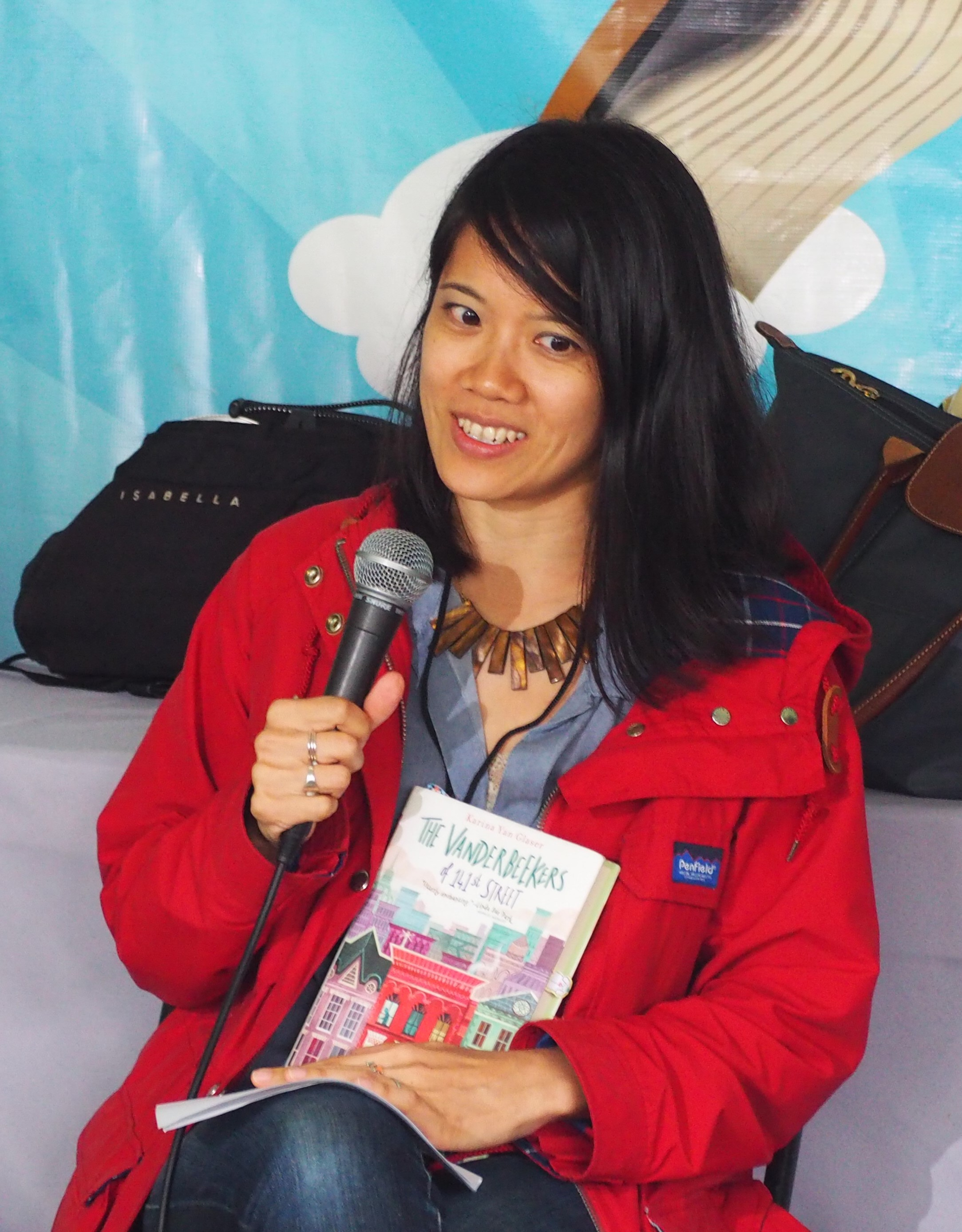
- Glaser reading at the 2018 Gaithersburg Book Festival.
- Born: 1979 or 1980 (age 45–46)
- Education: Barnard College
- Spouse: Dan Glaser
- Children: 2
- Writing career
- Genres: Children's literature, Young adult fiction
- Notable works: The Vanderbeekers series, The Nine Moons of Han Yu and Luli
- Website: www.karinaglaser.com

Karina Yan Glaser (born 1979 or 1980) is an American author. She is best known for the seven-volume children's fiction series The Vanderbeekers, about a family with five children and several pets living in Harlem. By the time of the final book's release in 2023, the Vanderbeekers books had sold more than half a million copies and been translated into 13 languages. The first book in the series was named one of The New York Times Book Review's notable children's books for 2017, and the second book in the series appeared on the New York Times Best Seller list for middle-grade children's books. Glaser's 2025 book The Nine Moons of Han Yu and Luli was a New York Times Best Seller and was recognized as a Newbery Honor book.

== Early life and education ==
Glaser was born in California to Chinese immigrant parents and grew up in Pasadena. She has a brother. As a child, she was attracted to books about big families, in particular those set in New York City. Glaser moved to New York City for college at Barnard, where she met her husband.

== Writing career ==
After Glaser had children, she began writing a blog about being a mother in New York City and was encouraged to continue writing. "As I would walk with my kids and our dog past brownstones in our Harlem neighborhood, I would sometimes think of the cover of one of the All-of-a-Kind Family books, with all the kids spilling out the front door of a brownstone, and that's when I began thinking about the Vanderbeekers."

=== The Vanderbeekers ===
Glaser took a writing course and participated in National Novel Writing Month, which she said resulted in the first draft of The Vanderbeekers of 141st Street. Houghton Mifflin Harcourt bought the manuscript and offered Glaser a contract for two standalone books, the latter of which was published in 2022 as A Duet for Home. Prior to publication of The Vanderbeekers of 141st Street, the publisher offered Glaser a contract for a sequel, The Vanderbeekers and the Hidden Garden. One book was published every year through 2023, when the final installment, The Vanderbeekers Ever After, was published.

The books follow the adventures of large multiracial family and their friends and neighbors. Reviewers noted that the books evoke older series about large families in urban settings, including Elizabeth Enright's Melendy family books and Sydney Taylor's All-of-a-Kind Family series—books that Glaser has said influenced The Vanderbeekers.

=== A Duet for Home ===
In 2022, Glaser published a standalone novel called A Duet for Home, a story about two preteens who live in a New York City homeless shelter. Reviewing the book in the New York Times, Padma Venkatraman said the book "revisits three of [the Vanderbeekers'] themes: family, community and home. Readers who love the Vanderbeekers will not be disappointed."

=== The Nine Moons of Han Yu and Luli ===
Glaser published The Nine Moons of Han Yu and Luli in 2025. A middle grades novel that jumps between a story of a boy in eighth-century western China and a girl in New York City's Chinatown during the Great Depression, the book was positively reviewed by The New York Times, The Horn Book, Publishers Weekly, Kirkus Reviews and World. The Nine Moons of Han Yu and Luli was named to School Library Journal's "best of 2025" list and appeared on the New York Times Best Seller list in October 2025. The book was named a Newbery Honor book in January 2026.

== Personal life ==
Glaser lives in Harlem. She is married to Dan Glaser; they have two daughters, three cats and two dogs. Glaser attends All Angels' Church.
