= The Vanderbeekers of 141st Street =

2017 children's novel by Karina Yan Glaser

- Author: Karina Yan Glaser
- Illustrator: Karina Yan Glaser
- Language: English
- Series: The Vanderbeekers
- Genre: Fiction
- Publisher: Clarion Books
- Publication date: October 3, 2017
- Publication place: United States
- Media type: Print
- Pages: 320
- ISBN: 9781328499219
- Followed by: The Vanderbeekers and the Hidden Garden

The Vanderbeekers of 141st Street is a children's novel by Karina Yan Glaser published in 2017. It was Glaser's debut novel and is the first novel in a series of seven about a large mixed-race family living in Harlem and their friends, neighbors and extended family. In this novel, the family must find a way to stay in their beloved brownstone apartment after their landlord declines to renew their lease.

The novel has been noted for its similarity to other series about large families in urban settings, including Elizabeth Enright's Melendy family books and Sydney Taylor's All-of-a-Kind Family series, as well as Jeanne Birdsall's The Penderwicks series. The book was listed as one of The New York Times Book Review's notable children's books for 2017.

== Plot summary ==
The Vanderbeeker family—a biracial family consisting of a mother, father, five children (twins Isa and Jessie, Oliver, Hyacinth and Laney), and a cat, dog and rabbit—live in a brownstone apartment on 141st Street in Harlem. Mr. Vanderbeeker works as a superintendent. Shortly before Christmas, their live-in landlord, the reclusive Mr. Beiderman, declines to renew their lease, forcing the Vanderbeeker family to move at the end of the year.

The Vanderbeeker children begin a variety of strategies to persuade Mr. Beiderman, whom they call "the Beiderman," to allow them to stay. Many of these efforts go awry, including attempting to prepare him a special breakfast (only for the tea tray to be dropped and shattered), gathering signatures from their friends in the neighborhood for a petition, sending a rude letter from Oliver, and giving him a kitten.

Mr. Beiderman's lack of responsiveness leads the children to learn more about him and his interests. As part of their research, they find out that Beiderman's wife and daughter had died in a car accident a few years prior and he has been living alone since. Finally, on Christmas Eve, as the family is enjoying their last Christmas season in their home, Isa plays a special violin piece. Beiderman complains about the noise, and Isa bravely goes upstairs to play the piece outside his door. Mr. Beiderman opens his door and apologizes. The family learns that Beiderman's late daughter was a violinist and that in his grief he has not been able to bear hearing the violin. On Christmas Day, he informs the family that he has changed his mind, and the Vanderbeekers invite their new friend to their Christmas breakfast.

== Reception ==
The Vanderbeekers of 141st Street was well-reviewed upon publication. In The New York Times Book Review, Jennifer Hubert Swan called it "a warmhearted, multiracial update to the classic big-family novel." Swan points to the "cherished brownstone" itself as another character, "a creaking, clanking, whistling haven of delights that evokes the pre-World War II New York City brownstone of Enright’s Melendy family. (The Vanderbeekers’ 'Roof of Epic Proportions,' a shared space where serious sibling meetings are convened, channels the spirit of the Melendy clan's 'Office,' a top-floor playroom off limits to adults.) When Isa muses, 'Do you think the brownstone loves us?' there is no doubt that the children view the building as the eighth Vanderbeeker."

Swan also praises Glaser's decision to "preserve the winsome tone and innocence of the aforementioned classics while updating them with a rich, modern diversity of characters, settings and problems," without resorting to "labeling the cultural or ethnic backgrounds of her characters outright." Instead, Swan writes, "Glaser plants subtle hints in dialogue, descriptions and names that could suggest a number of possibilities. For example, while we learn that the Vanderbeekers are 'a biracial family,' Glaser never explicitly says which races. Instead she sticks to eye color, foot size and hair: 'Isa inherited her mother’s stick-straight black hair, which Isa always wore in a sleek ponytail'; her twin, Jessie, has 'Papa’s wild, untamable hair.' Oliver has 'Mama’s dark eyes' while Hyacinth got 'Papa’s large feet.' This technique allows an array of young readers to come to the text and see themselves, their families and friends."

Kirkus Reviews called it a "heartwarming story about family and community that will appeal to readers who also enjoy an old-fashioned feel." School Library Journal recommended its purchase for middle-grade collections and noted that "fans of Sydney Taylor and Jeanne Birdsall are sure to be satisfied by this contemporary urban update of the family-centered novel."

Tish Harrison Warren praised the way Glaser evokes Harlem, writing in the New York Times that she "makes the neighborhood seem almost magical, a place where community flourishes and neighbors all know one another by name. . . . Glaser’s books are not didactic, yet they inspire me to dream of a better sort of world, a world where children are less lonely, a world that feels full of possibility and hope."

In addition to being named a New York Times notable book, The Vanderbeekers of 141st Street was named to several other best-of-the-year lists, including being recognized as World magazine's children's novel of the year The book has continued to be added to recommended reading lists. Jenna Bush Hager included it in her "Read with Jenna Jr." book club selection for 2022, and Laura Bush named it to her 2023 recommended reading list.

== Adaptation ==
In 2018, Amy Poehler's production company optioned The Vanderbeekers of 141st Street for adaptation.
