= The Vanderbeekers =

Series of children's novels about a large family in New York City

- The Vanderbeekers of 141st Street (2017); The Vanderbeekers and the Hidden Garden (2018); The Vanderbeekers to the Rescue (2019); The Vanderbeekers Lost and Found (2020); The Vanderbeekers Make a Wish (2021); The Vanderbeekers on the Road (2022); The Vanderbeekers Ever After (2023)
- Author: Karina Yan Glaser
- Illustrator: Karina Yan Glaser
- Cover artist: Karl James Mountford
- Language: English
- Genre: Children's literature
- Publisher: Clarion Books
- Published: October 3, 2017 – September 19, 2023
- No. of books: 7
- Website: harpercollins.com/collections/books-series-the-vanderbeekers

The Vanderbeekers is a series of seven middle-grade children's novels written and illustrated by Asian American author Karina Yan Glaser. Set primarily in Harlem, the books follow the adventures of a large multiracial family and their friends and neighbors. Although published between 2017 and 2023, reviewers noted that the books evoke older series about large families in urban settings, including Elizabeth Enright's Melendy family books and Sydney Taylor's All-of-a-Kind Family series, as well as Jeanne Birdsall's The Penderwicks and Gertrude Chandler Warner's original Boxcar Children series. By the time of the final book's release in 2023, the Vanderbeekers books had sold more than half a million copies and been translated into 13 languages.

== Background ==
As a first-generation American child of immigrants, Glaser grew up in a small family without extended family. "I devoured books about big families," she has said, adding that "reading books about big families, especially ones in New York City, always gave me a big thrill." Glaser moved to New York for college and remained there; after she had children, she began writing a blog about being a mother in New York City and was encouraged to continue writing. "As I would walk with my kids and our dog past brownstones in our Harlem neighborhood, I would sometimes think of the cover of one of the All-of-a-Kind Family books, with all the kids spilling out the front door of a brownstone, and that’s when I began thinking about the Vanderbeekers."

Glaser took a writing course and participated in National Novel Writing Month, which she said resulted in the first draft of The Vanderbeekers of 141st Street. Houghton Mifflin Harcourt bought the manuscript and offered Glaser a contract for two standalone books, the latter of which was published in 2022 as A Duet for Home. Prior to publication of The Vanderbeekers of 141st Street, the publisher offered Glaser a contract for a sequel, The Vanderbeekers and the Hidden Garden.

== Books ==
The books feature the Vanderbeeker family—a biracial family consisting of a mother, father, five children (twins Isa and Jessie, Oliver, Hyacinth and Laney), and a cat, dog and rabbit—along with a large cast of friends and neighbors. The Vanderbeekers live in a brownstone apartment on 141st Street in Harlem where Mr. Vanderbeeker works as a superintendent. The books take place over the course of roughly two years, beginning with Christmas and ending with Christmas.

=== The Vanderbeekers of 141st Street (2017) ===
Shortly before Christmas, the Vanderbeekers' live-in landlord, the reclusive Mr. Beiderman, declines to renew their lease, forcing the Vanderbeeker family to move at the end of the year. The Vanderbeeker children begin a variety of strategies to persuade "the Beiderman," to allow them to stay.

=== The Vanderbeekers and the Hidden Garden (2018) ===
This installment takes place during the summer, six months after the events of the previous book. While Isa is away at camp, the rest of the Vanderbeeker children struggle with the summer heat. After their beloved neighbor Mr. Jeet suffers a stroke, the children plan to transform an abandoned lot on 141st Street into a garden that will welcome him home.

=== The Vanderbeekers to the Rescue (2019) ===
During spring break the following year, the Vanderbeekers prepare for Isa's violin audition, Jessie's science fair project, Oliver's treehouse, Hyacinth's knitting project and Laney's gymnastics practice. When the children accidentally destroy Mrs. Vanderbeeker's baking business, they must race to fix their mistake, against the backdrop of a series of mysterious packages arriving at the door.

=== The Vanderbeekers Lost and Found (2020) ===
During the fall, the Vanderbeekers help Mr. Beiderman train for the New York City Marathon and plan a neighborhood fun run. The plot moves into action when they discover the true identity of the mysterious person living in the community garden.

=== The Vanderbeekers Make a Wish (2021) ===
The following summer, the Vanderbeekers prepare for Mr. Vanderbeeker's surprise 40th birthday party. But after he leaves town to help a good friend, the Vanderbeeker children find surprise guests at the brownstone and learn more than they knew about their paternal grandfather.

=== The Vanderbeekers on the Road (2022) ===
Immediately following the events of the previous book, the Vanderbeekers, Mr. Beiderman, and their friend Orlando set out on a road trip to pick up Mr. Vanderbeeker in the Midwest and surprise him with a birthday trip to the Pacific Coast. The Vanderbeeker family endure breakdowns, make new friends while camping and see America, all while Jessie and Orlando keep a secret about their future plans.

=== The Vanderbeekers Ever After (2023) ===
During the fall after their road trip, amid preparations for the wedding of two dear friends, one of the Vanderbeeker children receives a cancer diagnosis. The family rises to the challenge, befriending patients, staff and parents at the hospital while supporting their sick family member.

== Influences ==
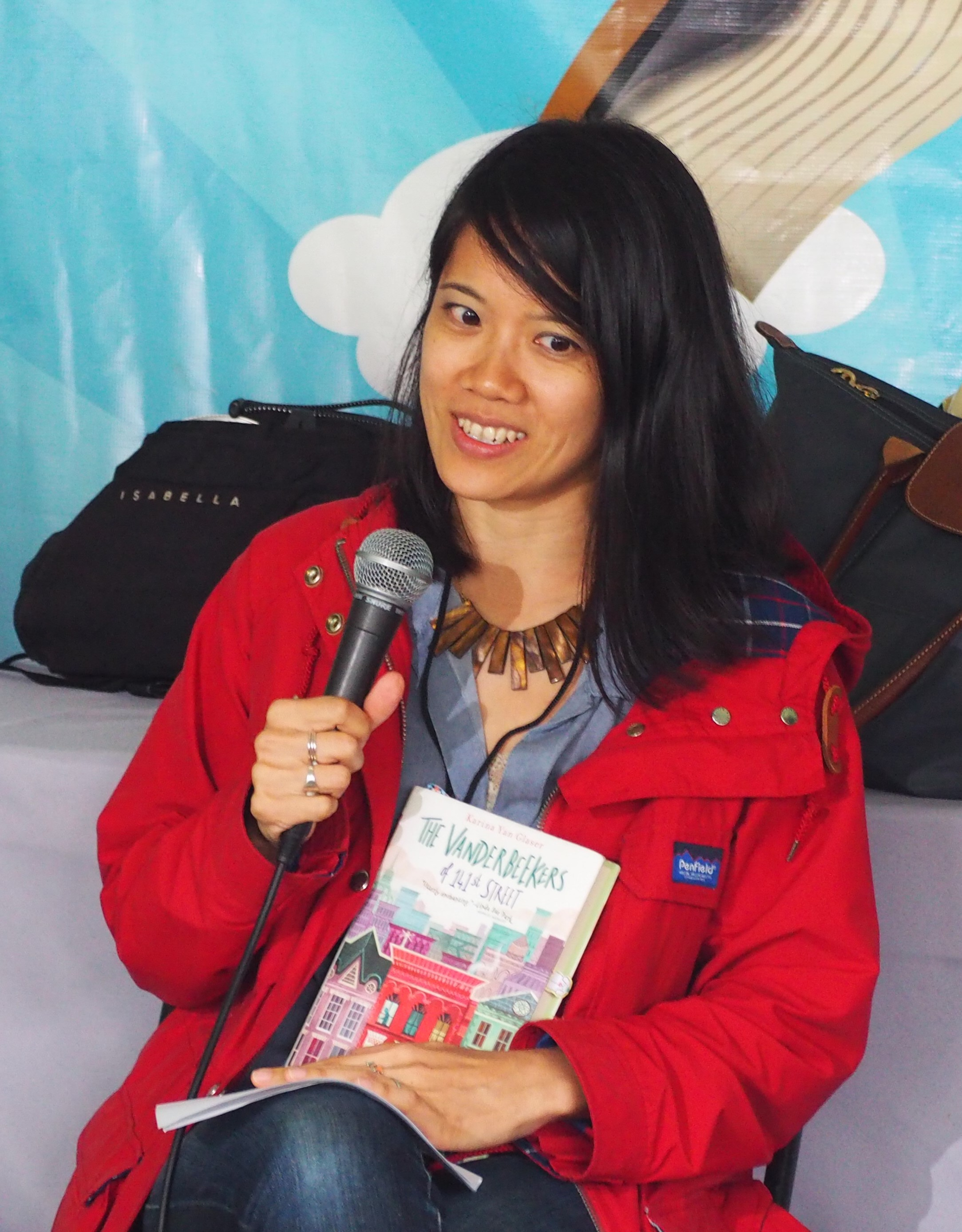
Karina Yan Glaser speaks about The Vanderbeekers at the 2018 Gaithersburg Book Festival.

Among works that Glaser has said influenced The Vanderbeekers are Enright's Melendy family books, Taylor's All-of-a-Kind Family series, Eleanor Estes' The Moffats, A Tree Grows in Brooklyn and From the Mixed-Up Files of Mrs. Basil E. Frankweiler.

== Reception ==
The Vanderbeekers books have been well-reviewed. In The New York Times Book Review, Jennifer Hubert Swan called the first installment "a warmhearted, multiracial update to the classic big-family novel." She also praised Glaser's decision to "preserve the winsome tone and innocence of the aforementioned classics while updating them with a rich, modern diversity of characters, settings and problems," without resorting to "labeling the cultural or ethnic backgrounds of her characters outright." Instead, Swan writes, "Glaser plants subtle hints in dialogue, descriptions and names that could suggest a number of possibilities. For example, while we learn that the Vanderbeekers are 'a biracial family,' Glaser never explicitly says which races. Instead she sticks to eye color, foot size and hair: 'Isa inherited her mother’s stick-straight black hair, which Isa always wore in a sleek ponytail'; her twin, Jessie, has 'Papa’s wild, untamable hair.' Oliver has 'Mama’s dark eyes' while Hyacinth got 'Papa’s large feet.' This technique allows an array of young readers to come to the text and see themselves, their families and friends."

In 2019, reviewing The Vanderbeekers to the Rescue, Swan described the book as "almost a case study in why these kinds of series are so captivating for young readers: Above all, while the happy ending might be a foregone conclusion, there is great satisfaction in seeing how their favorite characters untangle the knot this time."

The Vanderbeekers of 141st Street was listed as one of The New York Times Book Review's notable children's books for 2017. The Vanderbeekers and the Hidden Garden reached ninth on the New York Times Best Seller list for middle-grade children's books in October 2018.

== Adaptation ==
In 2018, Amy Poehler's production company optioned The Vanderbeekers of 141st Street for film or television adaptation.
