= Yaldah magazine =

North American magazine aimed at Jewish girls

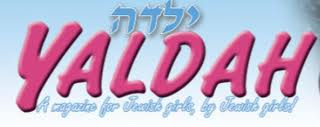
Yaldah Logo

Yaldah magazine was a magazine aimed at Jewish girls, which was also mainly written and edited by Jewish girls. In spring 2013 Yaldah had almost 3000 subscribers worldwide in the US, Canada, England, Israel, Australia, Spain, China as well as other countries and an editorial board of 19 girls from all over the US and Canada.

== History ==
In 2004, Leah Caras (then Larson) published the first issue of Yaldah at the age of 13 as a way to connect Jewish girls around the world. It was published on a quarterly magazine. The magazine became more and more widely known, and different types of publications, Jewish and non-Jewish, started requesting interviews and began to publish an enormous number of articles. This helped spread the word about the magazine.

In 2005, Yaldah formed their first editorial board with 13 girls, whose jobs consisted of writers, illustrators, photographers, and Q&A editors. In 2006, another editorial board was formed, and the first Jewish Girls Retreat was attended by over 50 girls.

Along with winning many other awards, in 2008, the magazine won $100,000 as a first place Wells Fargo Someday Stories winner, for an essay written by Caras' mother. Throughout this time, many advertising campaigns were launched including the Real Readers Campaign, 10Friends, Project 2010, and more. In 2009, Yaldah Media Inc. was founded, and its first two books were published.

Although the magazine mainly featured Orthodox girls and content, Caras has stated it was aimed at all Jewish girls.

The magazine was published exclusively online by spring 2013, and ceased publication in summer 2013. In 2015, Yaldah was integrated into Jewish Girls Unite, a non-profit co-founded by Caras.

== Yaldah Media Inc. ==
Yaldah Media Inc. was founded with the goal of “high quality Jewish books.”

Yaldah Media published The Yaldah Year in 2009 and One is Not a Lonely Number the following year, which won a Sydney Taylor Book Award.

In addition to publishing books, Yaldah Media provided a safe online forum, Jewish-Girls-Unite groups across the country, the Yaldah magazine, and summer and winter retreats.
