= 2019 FIBA U18 Women's European Championship =

International basketball competition

36th FIBA Under-18 Women's European Basketball Championship

Tournament details
- Host country: Bosnia and Herzegovina
- Dates: 6–14 July 2019
- Teams: 16
- Venue: 1 (in 1 host city)

Final positions
- Champions: Italy (3rd title)

Tournament statistics
- MVP: (Italy) Ilaria Panzera
- Top scorer: (Bosnia and Herzegovina) Dragana Zubac (18.3)
- Top rebounds: (Lithuania) Simona Visockaitė (11.7)
- Top assists: (Croatia) Nika Mühl (6.6)
- PPG (Team): (Spain) (79.0)
- RPG (Team): (Germany) (51.1)
- APG (Team): (Hungary) (20.3)

Official website
- www.fiba.basketball

The 2019 FIBA U18 Women's European Championship was an international basketball competition held from 6 to 14 July 2019 in Sarajevo, Bosnia and Herzegovina. It was the 36th edition of the championship. 16 national teams from across Europe, composed of women aged 18 and under, competed in the tournament.

== Venues ==
Sarajevo	2019 FIBA U18 Women's European Championship is located in Bosnia and Herzegovina
Mirza Delibašić Hall	2019 FIBA U18 Women's European Championship is located in Bosnia and Herzegovina
Capacity: 5,616	2019 FIBA U18 Women's European Championship is located in Bosnia and Herzegovina

== Participating teams ==
- Belarus ▲ (Runners-up, 2018 FIBA U18 Women's European Championship Division B)
- Belgium
- Bosnia and Herzegovina (Host)
- Croatia
- Czech Republic
- France
- Germany
- Hungary
- Israel ▲ (Third place, 2018 FIBA U18 Women's European Championship Division B)
- Italy
- Latvia
- Lithuania ▲ (Winners, 2018 FIBA U18 Women's European Championship Division B)
- Poland
- Russia
- Serbia
- Spain

== First round ==
The first-round groups draw took place on 13 December 2018 in Belgrade, Serbia.

All times are local (UTC+2).

=== Group A ===
Pos	Team	Pld	W	L	PF	PA	PD	Pts
1	Italy	3	3	0	211	148	+63	6
2	Germany	3	2	1	178	169	+9	5
3	Croatia	3	1	2	183	210	−27	4
4	Belgium	3	0	3	170	215	−45	3

Source: FIBA

6 July

Boxscore

Italy	73–52	Belgium
Scoring by quarter: 13–17, 22–11, 22–10, 16–14
Pts: Panzera 17; Rebs: Gilli 8 Asts: Natali 4		Pts: Lisowa Mbaka 14; Rebs: Lisowa Mbaka 8 Asts: Van Buggenhout, Vielfont 3

6 July

Boxscore

Croatia	48–75	Germany
Scoring by quarter: 8–28, 8–19, 19–13, 13–15
Pts: Mühl 12; Rebs: Jurić 7 Asts: Mühl 5		Pts: Bessoir 22; Rebs: Reichert 12; Asts: Förner 4

7 July

Boxscore

Belgium	55–75	Croatia
Scoring by quarter: 18–20, 17–19, 12–19, 8–17
Pts: Lisowa Mbaka 17; Rebs: Lisowa Mbaka 12; Asts: Van Buggenhout 3		Pts: Mandić 14; Rebs: Mandić 10; Asts: Mühl 8

7 July

Boxscore

Germany	36–58	Italy
Scoring by quarter: 10–10, 5–20, 6–18, 15–10
Pts: Gaba 9 Rebs: Egharevba 10; Asts: Kleine-Beek 4		Pts: Nasraoui 12; Rebs: Gilli 9 Asts: Orsili 4

8 July

Boxscore

Croatia	60–80	Italy
Scoring by quarter: 18–23, 10–16, 15–15, 17–26
Pts: Mandić 16; Rebs: Savić 7 Asts: Mühl 5		Pts: Natali 15; Rebs: Nasraoui 6 Asts: Orsili 3

8 July

Boxscore

Belgium	63–67	Germany
Scoring by quarter: 14–13, 9–13, 19–15, 21–26
Pts: Lisowa Mbaka 21; Rebs: Lisowa Mbaka 9 Asts: Vielfont 3		Pts: Bessoir 18; Rebs: Bessoir 11; Asts: Förner 4

=== Group B ===
Pos	Team	Pld	W	L	PF	PA	PD	Pts
1	Hungary	3	3	0	244	149	+95	6
2	Russia	3	2	1	186	191	−5	5
3	Serbia	3	1	2	195	211	−16	4
4	Belarus	3	0	3	192	266	−74	3

Source: FIBA

6 July
16:15

Boxscore

Serbia	50–74	Russia
Scoring by quarter: 12–17, 22–16, 8–18, 8–23
Pts: Mužević 19; Rebs: Stefanović 9 Asts: Dešić, Deurić 3		Pts: Bobrik 19; Rebs: Goncharova, Strebkova 7 Asts: Andrushchenko 5

Referees: Andris Aunkrogers (LAT), Ali Şakacı (TUR), Kyriakos Christou (CYP)

6 July
20:45

Boxscore

Hungary	97–61	Belarus
Scoring by quarter: 21–18, 33–11, 25–21, 18–11
Pts: Dombai 19; Rebs: Budácsik 10; Asts: Angyal 6		Pts: Babak 13; Rebs: Samailiuk 8 Asts: Vasilevich 4

7 July
14:00

Boxscore

Belarus	66–91	Serbia
Scoring by quarter: 19–26, 13–16, 11–26, 23–23
Pts: Venskaya 12; Rebs: Halauchyner 4 Asts: Venskaya 3		Pts: Jovanović 17; Rebs: Stefanović 8 Asts: Smailbegović 6

7 July
16:15

Boxscore

Russia	34–76	Hungary
Scoring by quarter: 5–19, 6–20, 15–18, 8–19
Pts: Andrushchenko 12; Rebs: Strebkova 8 Asts: Bobrik 4		Pts: Angyal 15; Rebs: Varga 12; Asts: Angyal 5

Referees: Maka Kupatadze (GEO), Ivan Miličević (BIH), Alakbar Hasanov (AZE)

8 July
20:45

Boxscore

Serbia	54–71	Hungary
Scoring by quarter: 13–11, 8–27, 20–25, 17–16
Pts: Mitrović 17; Rebs: Stefanović 8 Asts: Deurić 3		Pts: Dombai 21; Rebs: Varga 11; Asts: Dombai 3

8 July
20:45

Boxscore

Belarus	65–78	Russia
Scoring by quarter: 18–23, 13–14, 20–25, 14–16
Pts: Vasilevich 14; Rebs: Babak 7 Asts: Vasilevich 5		Pts: Andrushchenko 20; Rebs: three players 7 Asts: three players 4

Referees: Tom Dehondt (BEL), Kristaps Konstantinovs (LAT), Mindaugas Večerskis (LTU)

=== Group C ===
Pos	Team	Pld	W	L	PF	PA	PD	Pts
1	France	3	3	0	235	141	+94	6
2	Spain	3	2	1	220	170	+50	5
3	Czech Republic	3	1	2	157	213	−56	4
4	Israel	3	0	3	154	242	−88	3

Source: FIBA

6 July

Boxscore

Czech Republic	48–80	Spain
Scoring by quarter: 15–19, 9–23, 15–23, 9–15
Pts: Hamzová 8 Rebs: Buřtová 6 Asts: Fučíková 2		Pts: Carrera 14; Rebs: García Mateo 7 Asts: Lomana 6

6 July

Boxscore

France	95–39	Israel
Scoring by quarter: 18–2, 22–12, 25–5, 30–20
Pts: Salaun 15; Rebs: Gueye 8 Asts: Pardon 8		Pts: Hagag 9 Rebs: Zipel 6 Asts: Eisner 3

7 July

Boxscore

Spain	63–64	France
Scoring by quarter: 17–16, 11–19, 18–12, 17–17
Pts: Lomana 19; Rebs: Dembele 6 Asts: Dembele 5		Pts: Gueye 12; Rebs: Gueye 9 Asts: Guennoc 5

7 July

Boxscore

Israel	57–70	Czech Republic
Scoring by quarter: 20–15, 14–18, 12–19, 11–18
Pts: Sless 18; Rebs: Simionovich 7 Asts: Eisner 5		Pts: Zeithammerová 14; Rebs: Paťorková 12; Asts: Zeithammerová 4

8 July

Boxscore

Israel	58–77	Spain
Scoring by quarter: 19–18, 17–21, 14–24, 8–14
Pts: Zipel 26; Rebs: Eisner 9 Asts: Eisner 5		Pts: Soler 13; Rebs: Carrera 6 Asts: Dembele 8

8 July

Boxscore

Czech Republic	39–76	France
Scoring by quarter: 11–25, 8–17, 9–17, 11–17
Pts: Šitancová 11; Rebs: Paťorková 6 Asts: Fučíková 2		Pts: Guennoc 12; Rebs: Gueye 7 Asts: Pardon 5

=== Group D ===
Pos	Team	Pld	W	L	PF	PA	PD	Pts
1	Latvia	3	3	0	247	213	+34	6
2	Lithuania	3	1	2	205	196	+9	4 (Note: Lithuania 1–1, +13 PD; Bosnia and Herzegovina 1–1, +1 PD; Poland 1–1, –14 PD)
3	Bosnia and Herzegovina (H)	3	1	2	215	239	−24	4
4	Poland	3	1	2	225	244	−19	4

Source: FIBA
(H) Hosts
Notes:

6 July

Boxscore

Lithuania	69–54	Poland
Scoring by quarter: 13–14, 17–15, 16–11, 23–14
Pts: Visockaitė 21; Rebs: Visockaitė 10; Asts: Sinickaitė 4		Pts: Kośla 9 Rebs: Kowalska 7 Asts: Rogozińska 3

6 July

Boxscore

Latvia	85–60	Bosnia and Herzegovina
Scoring by quarter: 22–25, 17–13, 29–9, 17–13
Pts: Kļeščova 18; Rebs: Meldere 13; Asts: Nulle 7		Pts: Mitrić 16; Rebs: Selimović 8 Asts: Kešeljević 3

7 July

Boxscore

Poland	84–89 (OT)	Latvia
Scoring by quarter: 14–26, 18–14, 21–18, 23–18, Overtime: 8-13
Pts: Szymkiewicz 27; Rebs: Rogozińska 9 Asts: Rogozińska 7		Pts: Meldere 28; Rebs: Meldere 20; Asts: Kļeščova 5

7 July

Boxscore

Bosnia and Herzegovina	69–67	Lithuania
Scoring by quarter: 20–22, 17–14, 18–8, 14–23
Pts: Zubac 22; Rebs: Zubac 6 Asts: Kešeljević 7		Pts: Miknaitė 14; Rebs: Visockaitė 9 Asts: Sinickaitė 3

8 July

Boxscore

Lithuania	69–73	Latvia
Scoring by quarter: 17–20, 12–17, 29–15, 11–21
Pts: Sinickaitė 20; Rebs: Čižauskaitė 9 Asts: Savostaitė 2		Pts: Meldere 30; Rebs: Meldere 13; Asts: Nulle 6

8 July

Boxscore

Bosnia and Herzegovina	86–87 (OT)	Poland
Scoring by quarter: 23–19, 18–16, 19–16, 11–20, Overtime: 15-16
Pts: Zubac 24; Rebs: Nikšić 11; Asts: Kešeljević 9		Pts: Bazan 20; Rebs: Pszczolarska 16; Asts: Ustowska 3

== Final round ==
=== Championship bracket ===
Round of 16
10 July
Italy	96
Belarus	57
10 July
Spain	109
Bosnia and Herzegovina	36
10 July
Russia (OT)	83
Croatia	81
10 July
Latvia	74
Israel	58
10 July
Germany	58
Serbia	48
10 July
France	75
Poland	54
10 July
Hungary (OT)	83
Belgium	73
10 July
Lithuania	59
Czech Republic (OT)	64

Quarterfinals
11 July
Italy	76
Spain	63
11 July
Russia	79
Latvia	52
11 July
Germany	49
France	72
11 July
Hungary	90
Czech Republic	61

Semifinals
13 July
Italy	75
Russia	49
13 July
France	56
Hungary	67

Final
14 July
Italy	70
Hungary	62
3rd place game
14 July
Russia	45
France	77

=== 5th place bracket ===
5th–8th place semifinals
13 July
Spain	75
Latvia	46
13 July
Germany	65
Czech Republic	61

5th place game
14 July
Spain	86
Germany	61
7th place game
14 July
Latvia	59
Czech Republic	52

=== 9th place bracket ===
9th–16th place quarterfinals
11 July
Belarus	63
Bosnia and Herzegovina	61
11 July
Croatia	56
Israel	58
11 July
Serbia	67
Poland	71
11 July
Belgium	59
Lithuania	48

9th–12th place semifinals
13 July
Belarus	70
Israel	62
13 July
Poland	82
Belgium	73

9th place game
14 July
Belarus	67
Poland	65
11th place game
14 July
Israel	64
Belgium	47

=== 13th place bracket ===
13th–16th place semifinals
13 July
Bosnia and Herzegovina	73
Croatia	70
13 July
Serbia	65
Lithuania	66

13th place game
14 July
Bosnia and Herzegovina	63
Lithuania	69
15th place game
14 July
Croatia	70
Serbia	48

=== Round of 16 ===
10 July 2019
14:00

Boxscore

Russia	83–81 (OT)	Croatia
Scoring by quarter: 19–19, 15–14, 13–25, 25–14, Overtime: 11–9
Pts: Bobrik 23; Rebs: Bobrik 9 Asts: Strebkova 5		Pts: Vukšić 28; Rebs: Mühl 9 Asts: Mühl 11

Referees: Silvia Marziali (ITA), Alexander Eger (AUT), Francisco Araña (ESP)

10 July 2019
14:00

Boxscore

France	75–54	Poland
Scoring by quarter: 23–15, 18–12, 8–13, 26–14
Pts: Gueye 18; Rebs: Gueye, Salaun 10; Asts: Pardon 12		Pts: Kośla 21; Rebs: Borkowska 5 Asts: Kośla 3

10 July 2019
16:15

Boxscore

Germany	58–48	Serbia
Scoring by quarter: 26–10, 8–15, 14–14, 10–9
Pts: Gaba 16; Rebs: Bessoir 21; Asts: Bessoir 6		Pts: Deurić 13; Rebs: Deurić, Stefanović 7 Asts: Nedeljkov 2

10 July 2019
16:15

Boxscore

Latvia	74–58	Israel
Scoring by quarter: 24–23, 16–11, 16–15, 18–9
Pts: Indriķe, Nulle 14; Rebs: Meldere 11; Asts: Kļeščova, Meldere 4		Pts: Zipel 16; Rebs: Garzon 7 Asts: Eisner, Karsh 4

10 July 2019
18:30

Boxscore

Hungary	83–73 (OT)	Belgium
Scoring by quarter: 13–14, 21–17, 16–18, 14–15, Overtime: 19–9
Pts: Dombai 22; Rebs: Kiss 12; Asts: Angyal 6		Pts: Lisowa Mbaka 30; Rebs: Lisowa Mbaka 9 Asts: Lisowa Mbaka, Vielfont 4

10 July 2019
18:30

Boxscore

Spain	109–36	Bosnia and Herzegovina
Scoring by quarter: 33–12, 28–16, 23–4, 25–4
Pts: Pueyo 18; Rebs: Fraile 9 Asts: three players 4		Pts: Mitrić 9 Rebs: Kovačević, Radulović 5 Asts: Kešeljević, Mitrić 2

10 July 2019
20:45

Boxscore

Italy	96–57	Belarus
Scoring by quarter: 23–16, 27–9, 27–16, 19–16
Pts: Leonardi 15; Rebs: Spinelli 10; Asts: Pastrello 4		Pts: Halauchyner 12; Rebs: Babak, Chyzheuskaya 5 Asts: Babak 3

10 July 2019
20:45

Boxscore

Lithuania	59–64 (OT)	Czech Republic
Scoring by quarter: 17–14, 9–11, 10–16, 18–13, Overtime: 5–10
Pts: Visockaitė 18; Rebs: Visockaitė 13; Asts: Miknaitė, Sinickaitė 3		Pts: Buřtová, Malíková 13; Rebs: Halátková 11; Asts: Zeithammerová 7

=== 9th–16th place quarterfinals ===
11 July 2019
14:00

Boxscore

Serbia	67–71	Poland
Scoring by quarter: 12–15, 18–19, 24–22, 13–15
Pts: Mužević 17; Rebs: Deurić 10; Asts: Nedeljkov 7		Pts: Kośla 17; Rebs: Borkowska 8 Asts: Bazan, Kośla 2

11 July 2019
16:15

Boxscore

Croatia	56–58	Israel
Scoring by quarter: 14–12, 11–17, 18-18, 13–11
Pts: Mühl 20; Rebs: Mandić 13; Asts: Mühl 6		Pts: Zipel 14; Rebs: Eisner 14; Asts: Karsh 4

11 July 2019
18:30

Boxscore

Belarus	63–61	Bosnia and Herzegovina
Scoring by quarter: 20–14, 15–16, 8–15, 20–16
Pts: Vasilevich 16; Rebs: three players 8 Asts: Vasilevich 6		Pts: Zubac 24; Rebs: Nikšić 13; Asts: Kešeljević 6

11 July 2019
20:45

Boxscore

Belgium	59–48	Lithuania
Scoring by quarter: 11–15, 16–6, 10–13, 22–14
Pts: Van Buggenhout 16; Rebs: Lisowa Mbaka 12; Asts: Knaepen 6		Pts: Miknaitė 11; Rebs: Visockaitė 19; Asts: Sinickaitė 6

=== Quarterfinals ===
11 July 2019
14:00

Boxscore

Germany	49–72	France
Scoring by quarter: 13–20, 13–11, 4–22, 19–19
Pts: Bessoir 9 Rebs: Gaba 8 Asts: Mayer 4		Pts: Ewodo, Raynaud 11; Rebs: Salaun 7 Asts: Guennoc 6

11 July 2019
16:15

Boxscore

Russia	79–52	Latvia
Scoring by quarter: 25–14, 14–13, 21–13, 19–12
Pts: Andrushchenko 15; Rebs: Andreeva, Bobrik 9 Asts: Filimonova, Krymova 4		Pts: Meldere 17; Rebs: Meldere 10; Asts: Miķelsone 3

Referees: Tomislav Vovk (CRO), Ofer Manheim (ISR), Marion Ortis (FRA)

11 July 2019
18:30

Boxscore

Italy	76–63	Spain
Scoring by quarter: 17–18, 17–14, 25–20, 17–11
Pts: Panzera 20; Rebs: Panzera 9 Asts: Panzera 9		Pts: Carrera 20; Rebs: Carrera 12; Asts: three players 3

11 July 2019
20:45

Boxscore

Hungary	90–61	Czech Republic
Scoring by quarter: 28–25, 29–15, 23–8, 10–13
Pts: Dombai 26; Rebs: Varga 8 Asts: Angyal 5		Pts: Šitancová 13; Rebs: Halátková, Paťorková 6 Asts: Malíková 3

=== 13th–16th place semifinals ===
13 July 2019
14:00

Boxscore

Bosnia and Herzegovina	73–70	Croatia
Scoring by quarter: 16–23, 19–14, 14–22, 24–11
Pts: Zubac 20; Rebs: Nikšić 5 Asts: Zubac 4		Pts: Mandić 18; Rebs: Mandić 15; Asts: Mühl 4

13 July 2019
16:15

Boxscore

Serbia	65–66	Lithuania
Scoring by quarter: 13–16, 21–16, 19–21, 12–13
Pts: Stefanović 16; Rebs: Stefanović 13; Asts: Corto 5		Pts: Miknaitė 22; Rebs: Visockaitė 15; Asts: Sinickaitė 5

=== 9th–12th place semifinals ===
13 July 2019
14:00

Boxscore

Belarus	72–62	Israel
Scoring by quarter: 23–21, 19–14, 13–21, 17–6
Pts: Vasilevich 19; Rebs: Chyzheuskaya 9 Asts: Vasilevich 9		Pts: Zipel 15; Rebs: Eisner 11; Asts: Karsh 6

13 July 2019
16:15

Boxscore

Poland	82–73	Belgium
Scoring by quarter: 21–19, 33–23, 12–13, 16–18
Pts: Szymkiewicz 29; Rebs: Borkowska 17; Asts: Szymkiewicz 3		Pts: Van Buggenhout 20; Rebs: Kapenga 9 Asts: Lisowa Mbaka 7

=== 5th–8th place semifinals ===
13 July 2019
18:30

Boxscore

Spain	75–46	Latvia
Scoring by quarter: 24–7, 17–9, 16–11, 18–19
Pts: Fraile, Mato 10; Rebs: Carrera 11; Asts: Carrera 4		Pts: Meldere 13; Rebs: Harčenko, Meldere 6 Asts: Gerke 4

13 July 2019
20:45

Boxscore

Germany	65–61	Czech Republic
Scoring by quarter: 19–15, 15–19, 23–8, 8–19
Pts: Bessoir 18; Rebs: Bessoir 17; Asts: Kleine-Beek 5		Pts: Malíková 17; Rebs: Paťorková 8 Asts: Zeithammerová 7

=== Semifinals ===
13 July 2019
18:30

Boxscore

Italy	75–49	Russia
Scoring by quarter: 26–12, 19–5, 16–19, 14–13
Pts: Panzera 12; Rebs: Gilli 9 Asts: Gilli 7		Pts: Krymova 14; Rebs: Goncharova 13; Asts: six players 1

Referees: Andris Aunkrogers (LAT), Ivan Miličević (BIH), Tom Dehondt (BEL)

13 July 2019
20:45

Boxscore

France	56–67	Hungary
Scoring by quarter: 13–18, 15–13, 15–20, 13–16
Pts: Mahoutou 9 Rebs: Kessler 8 Asts: Pardon 6		Pts: Dombai 16; Rebs: Varga 10; Asts: Dombai 7

=== 15th place game ===
14 July 2019
13:00

Boxcore

Croatia	70–48	Serbia
Scoring by quarter: 20–12, 17–14, 14–10, 19–12
Pts: Jurić 14; Rebs: Savić 6 Asts: Mühl 7		Pts: Stefanović 10; Rebs: Deurić 11; Asts: Deurić 4

=== 13th place game ===
14 July 2019
15:15

Boxcore

Bosnia and Herzegovina	63–69	Lithuania
Scoring by quarter: 12–24, 17–10, 19–16, 15–19
Pts: Zubac 19; Rebs: Zubac 11; Asts: Zubac 4		Pts: Miknaitė 18; Rebs: Čižauskaitė 11; Asts: Sinickaitė 3

=== 11th place game ===
14 July 2019
12:00

Boxcore

Israel	64–47	Belgium
Scoring by quarter: 16–8, 19–14, 15–15, 14–10
Pts: Zipel 18; Rebs: Eisner 13; Asts: Zipel 5		Pts: Kapenga 11; Rebs: Ekofo Yomane 7 Asts: Vielfont 5

=== 9th place game ===
14 July 2019
14:15

Boxcore

Belarus	67–65	Poland
Scoring by quarter: 16–15, 12–19, 19–8, 20–23
Pts: Vasilevich 16; Rebs: Trafimenkava 8 Asts: Vasilevich 6		Pts: Szymkiewicz 14; Rebs: Borkowska 10; Asts: Szymkiewicz 3

=== 7th place game ===
14 July 2019
16:30

Boxscore

Latvia	59–52	Czech Republic
Scoring by quarter: 17–9, 7–17, 16–10, 19–16
Pts: Nulle 12; Rebs: Meldere 8 Asts: Vihmane 3		Pts: Malíková 15; Rebs: Malíková 9 Asts: Halátková 4

=== 5th place game ===
14 July 2019
18:45

Boxscore

Spain	86–61	Germany
Scoring by quarter: 24–9, 21–18, 25–20, 16–14
Pts: Soler 24; Rebs: Hermosa 7 Asts: Lamana 9		Pts: Kleine-Beek 17; Rebs: Egharevba 10; Asts: three players 2

=== Bronze medal game ===
14 July 2019
17:30

Boxscore

Russia	45–77	France
Scoring by quarter: 14–26, 13–14, 10–18, 8–19
Pts: Bobrik 11; Rebs: Filimonova, Strebkova 6 Asts: Krymova 2		Pts: Pardon 13; Rebs: Kessler, Magassa 10; Asts: Kessler 6

Referees: Vladimir Jevtović (SRB), Lizaveta Famina (BLR), Kyriakos Christou (CYP)

=== Final ===
14 July 2019
19:45

Boxscore

Italy	70–62	Hungary
Scoring by quarter: 21–8, 21–21, 13–23, 15–10
Pts: Orsili 19; Rebs: Panzera 11; Asts: Panzera 7		Pts: Dombai 16; Rebs: Varga 11; Asts: Angyal, Varga 5

Dvorana "Mirza Delibasic" - Skenderija, Sarajevo
Referees: Ali Şakacı (TUR), Marion Ortis (FRA), Kristaps Konstantinovs (LAT)

== Final standings ==
Rank	Team	Record
1st place, gold medalist(s)	Italy	7–0
2nd place, silver medalist(s)	Hungary	6–1
3rd place, bronze medalist(s)	France	6–1
4	Russia	4–3
5	Spain	5–2
6	Germany	4–3
7	Latvia	5–2
8	Czech Republic	2–5
9	Belarus	3–4
10	Poland	3–4
11	Israel	2–5
12	Belgium	1–6
13	Lithuania	3–4
14	Bosnia and Herzegovina	2–5
15	Croatia	2–5
16	Serbia	1–6

Spared from relegation due to the exclusion of Russia and Belarus
Relegated to the 2022 FIBA U18 Women's European Championship Division B

== Awards ==
2019 FIBA Europe Under-18 Championship for Women
winners

Italy
Third title

Most Valuable Player
(Italy) Ilaria Panzera

=== All-Tournament Team ===
- (Italy) Ilaria Panzera
- (Hungary) Réka Dombai
- (France) Janelle Salaun
- (Italy) Caterina Gilli
- (Hungary) Angelika Kiss
