= June Cummins =

American scholar and writer (1963–2018)

June Stacey Cummins
- Born: May 5, 1963; New York City, U.S.
- Died: February 22, 2018 (aged 54); Skokie, Illinois, U.S.
- Education: University of California, Berkeley (B.A. English, 1985); Columbia University (M.A., M.Phil., Ph.D. English, 1986–1998)
- Occupations: Scholar; Professor of Children's Literature
- Employer(s): San Diego State University (Professor of English & Comparative Literature)
- Notable work: From Sarah to Sydney: The Woman Behind “All‑of‑a‑Kind Family” (2021)
- Spouse: Jonathan Lewis
- Children: Three sons
- Awards: Children's Literature Association Mentoring Award (2017)

June Cummins (1963–2018) was an American scholar of children's literature and a professor at San Diego State University. Her research included Jewish children's literature and diversity in children's publishing, and she wrote a biography of Sydney Taylor.

== Early life and education ==
Cummins was born in New York City in 1963, and grew up in San Diego, California. She earned her Bachelor of Arts in English from the University of California, Berkeley in 1985, and went on to complete her Master’s, M.Phil., and Ph.D. in English at Columbia University between 1986 and 1998.

== Career ==
Cummins was a professor of children's literature at San Diego State University from 1998-2018. She helped establish the National Center of the Study of Children’s Literature at SDSU, and served as its director.

Cummins served on the Children’s Literature Association Board of Directors and its Diversity Committee. She received the association’s Mentoring Award in 2017.

Cummins published on Jewish children’s literature and LGBTQ+ themes in young adult literature. Her work also examined the publishing and marketing of children’s books.

Cummins was diagnosed with amyotrophic lateral sclerosis (ALS) in 2015. With the assistance of historian Alexandra Dunietz, she completed From Sarah to Sydney: The Woman Behind "All-of-a-Kind Family", a biography of Sydney Taylor, which was posthumously published by Yale University Press in 2021. The book discusses Taylor’s life and her authorship of All-of-a-Kind Family, the first mainstream children’s book in the U.S. to feature Jewish characters. Cummins' biography of Taylor was favorably reviewed in The Wall Street Journal, The New York Times, American Jewish History, and other publications.

== Selected publications ==
- Cummins, June (March 1995). "Romancing the Plot: The Real Beast of Disney's Beauty and the Beast". Children's Literature Association Quarterly. 20 (1): 22–28. doi:10.1353/chq.0.0872.
- Cummins, June (January 1997). "The Resisting Monkey: 'Curious George,' Slave Captivity Narratives, and the Postcolonial Condition". Ariel: A Review of International English Literature. 28 (1): 69.
- Cummins, June (December 2005). "Leaning Left: Progressive Politics in Sydney Taylor's All-of-a-Kind Family Series". Children's Literature Association Quarterly. 30 (4): 386–408. doi:10.1353/chq.2006.0011.
- Cummins, June (September 2011). "What Are Jewish Boys and Girls Made Of? Gender in Contemporary Jewish Teen and Tween Fiction". Children's Literature Association Quarterly. 36 (3): 296–317. doi:10.1353/chq.2011.0033.
- Cummins, June (2012). "Where in America Are You, God? Judy Blume, Margaret Simon, and American National Identity". In Vallone, Lynne; Mickenberg, Julia (eds.). The Oxford Handbook of Children's Literature. Oxford University Press. pp. 351–369. doi:10.1093/oxfordhb/9780195379785.013.0018.
- Cummins, June (October 2015). "From Overlooked to Looking Over: Lesbians in Children's and Young Adult Literature". Journal of Lesbian Studies. 19 (4): 401–405. doi:10.1080/10894160.2015.1059728.
- Cummins, June (April 2015). "Suffer the Little Children: Uses of the Past in Jewish and African American Children's Literature". The Lion and the Unicorn. 39 (2): 225–228. doi:10.1353/uni.2015.0013.
- Cummins, June (2016). "The Still Almost All-White World of Children's Literature: Theory, Practice, and Identity-Based Children's Book Awards". In Kidd, Kenneth B.; Thomas, Joseph T., Jr. (eds.). Prizing Children's Literature: The Cultural Politics of Children's Book Awards. Routledge. pp. 87–103.
- Cummins, June; Dunietz, Alexandra (2021). From Sarah to Sydney: The Woman Behind All-of-a-Kind Family. New Haven, Connecticut: Yale University Press. ISBN 9780300243550.

== Personal life ==
Cummins was married to Jonathan Lewis, a physicist, and had three children.

== Death ==
Cummins died on February 22, 2018, in Skokie, Illinois at age 54.
