= The Nine Moons of Han Yu and Luli =

2025 children's novel

- Author: Karina Yan Glaser
- Language: English
- Publisher: HarperCollins
- Publication date: September 16, 2025
- Publication place: United States
- Media type: Print (hardcover)
- Pages: 432
- Award: Newbery Honor
- ISBN: 978-1-5476-0589-7

The Nine Moons of Han Yu and Luli is a 2025 children's historical fiction novel written by Karina Yan Glaser. It follows the stories of 11-year-olds Han Yu and Luli Lee and the tribulations of their lives growing up in 8th century China and 1930s New York City, respectively.

== Plot ==
Han Yu lives with his family in Chang'an, China, where he sells buns at the local market and has a reputation for his ability to befriend animals, rumored to include tigers. After members of his family fall ill from a disease carried by travelers on the Silk Road, Han is forced to make a perilous journey to a far off city to get medicine and money to help the family, encountering bandits, con-men, a poet, and tigers along the way.

In depression-era New York City, Luli Lee helps her family's restaurant stay afloat as they save money to buy the building the restaurant is in. After Black Tuesday, the family's home and business are in danger of foreclosure, so Luli decides to covert part of the building into a museum, exhibiting pieces of Chinese art her family has collected, including a scroll from 8th century China, and charging patrons to enter.

== Reception ==
The book earned a Newbery Honor in 2026 and was positively reviewed by The New York Times, The Horn Book, Publishers Weekly, and Kirkus Reviews. It was also made the School Library Journal's best of list for 2025.
