= Cejwin Camps =

Location
- Port Jervis, New York
- Coordinates: 41°23′59″N 74°39′13″W

Information
- Former name: Central Jewish Institute Camps (until 1933)
- Type: Jewish summer camp
- Founded: 1919
- Founder: Dr. Albert P. Schoolman
- Closed: 1992; 34 years ago
- Gender: Co-educational
- Enrollment: 1,300 (1961)

Cejwin Camps was a Jewish summer camp near Port Jervis, New York, established in 1919 by the Central Jewish Institute. At its height it was "the most significant non-Hebrew Jewish cultural camp."

== History ==
The camp was founded in 1919 by the Central Jewish Institute, an independent Jewish community center in Manhattan, as a two-week vacation home for needy Talmud Torah students. After its second summer, it was expanded into an educational residential camp under the leadership of the institute's director, Dr. Albert P. Schoolman, a disciple of Samson Benderly. A permanent site for the camp on Martin's Lake near Port Jervis, New York was purchased in 1923, and opened the following July.

Cejwin's Jewish practice was influenced by the Reconstructionist outlooks of Rabbis Mordecai Kaplan and Ira Eisenstein, both of whom frequently visited the camp. Its initial program included Hebrew and Judaica classes alongside recreational camp activities like music and arts and crafts. Though formal instruction was abandoned during the Great Depression, Schoolman continued to promote Hebrew and Judaism through informal education.

The camp's name was changed from Central Jewish Institute Camps to Cejwin Camps in 1933.

Cejwin consisted of seven camps, divided by age groups: three for boys (Hadar, Carmel and Aviv), three for girls (Hadas, Carmela and Aviva), and one co-ed (Yonim, the youngest). In the 1970s, Yonim was divided into Junior Hadar and Junior Hadas.

== Legacy ==
As one of the first Jewish cultural camps in the United States, Cejwin Camps was highly influential in the camping movement. The founders of Camp Ramah, one of whom had previously attended Cejwin, were inspired by the camp's model, while Schoolman himself went on to help found Camp Modin in Maine.

== Notable alumni and staff ==
- Sylvia Ettenberg
- Temima Gezari
- Ellen Greene
- Sydney Taylor
- Marvin Terban
