= Emily Bessoir =

German basketball player

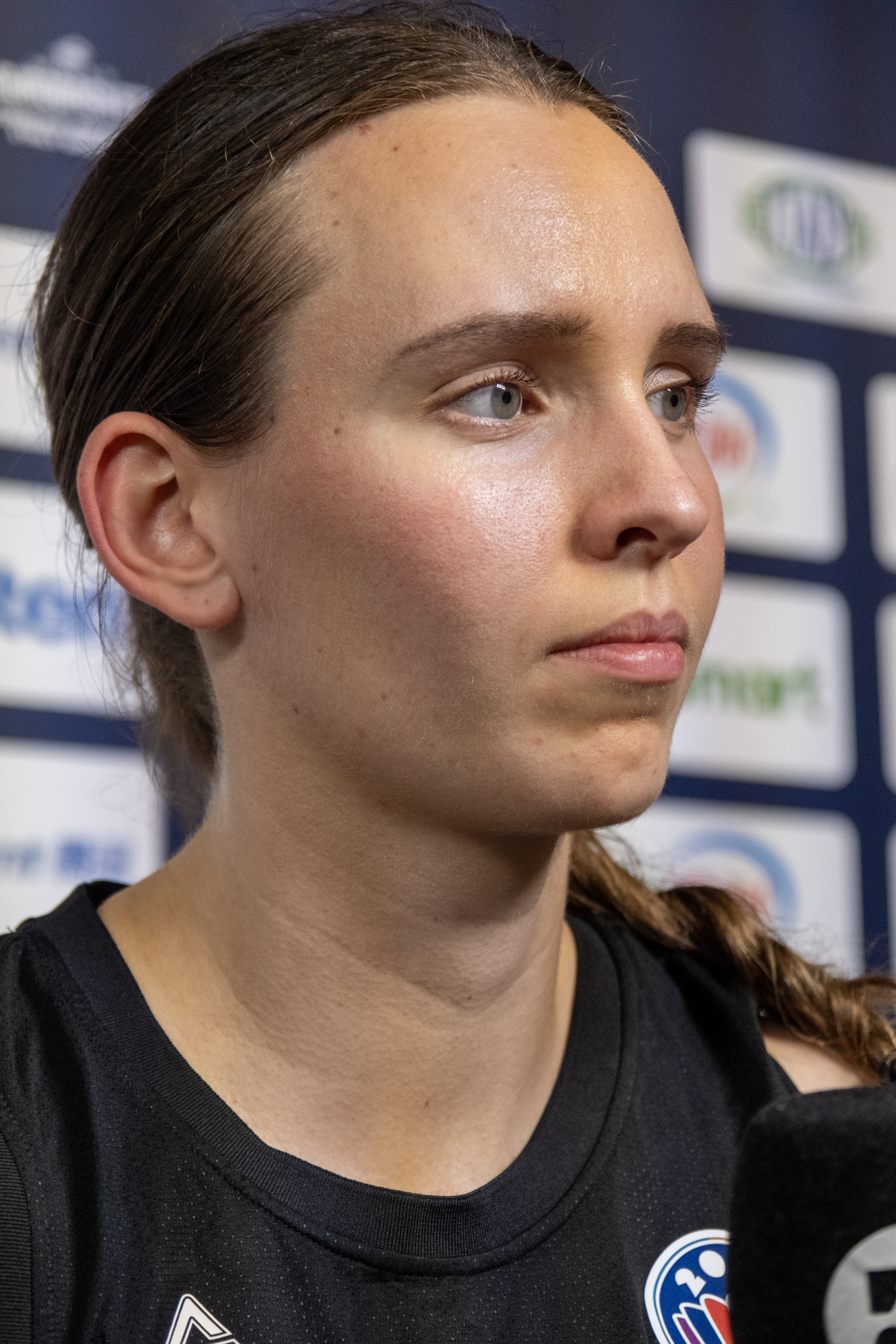

Personal information
- Born: 19 November 2001 (age 24) Munich, Germany
- Listed height: 192 cm (6 ft 4 in)

Career information
- High school: Wilhelm-Hausenstein Gymnasium (Germany)
- College: UCLA (2020–2024)
- Position: Small forward
- Number: 11

Career highlights
- Pac-12 All-Freshman Team (2021)
Medals
Women's basketball
Representing Germany
FIBA Under-18 European Championship
Gold medal – first place	2018 Italy	Team
FIBA Under-16 European Championship
Silver medal – second place	2016 Italy	Team

Emily Bessoir (born 19 November 2001) is a German basketball player who played college basketball for the UCLA Bruins of the Pac-12 Conference. She represents Germany in international play.

== Early life ==
Bessoir was born on 19 November 2001 in Munich, Germany. She was raised there by a family with a basketball background. Her father was a three-time All-American player at Scranton, and both her parents played professionally. Bessoir stated that she modeled her game after Elena Delle Donne.

== Club career ==
Prior to moving to the United States to play for UCLA, Bessoir played for TS Jahn München. In the 2019–20 season, she averaged 17.9 points, 12.3 rebounds, and 2.1 steals over 31 minutes per game.

== College career ==
Bessoir's father assisted her with her recruitment process. Bessoir and UCLA head coach Cori Close were both present at the 2019 FIBA U18 Women's European Championship in Bangkok, with Bessoir representing Germany and Close coaching the American team. UCLA's recruiting class for Bessoir's freshman season was exclusively made up of international players; she was joined by Australians Izzy Anstey and Gemma Potter.

Playing 20.7 minutes per game, Bessoir averaged 7.5 points and 5.2 rebounds per game in her freshman season. She was named to the 2020–21 Pac-12 All-Freshman team.

During practice in October 2021, she suffered a torn ACL, causing her to miss the entire 2021–22 season with a torn anterior cruciate ligament (ACL). She played all 37 games the following season. In a December game versus CSU Bakersfield, Bessoir scored 12 points as UCLA won 75–47. In February 2023, she scored 20 points and hit four 3-pointers in a 67–57 win over Oregon.

UCLA opened up their 2023 Pac-12 Tournament play against Arizona State, with Bessoir scoring 17 points and grabbing 9 rebounds in an 81–70 overtime win. In UCLA's following game, she scored 18 points and 13 rebounds in a win over No. 21-ranked Arizona, registering her first career double-double. In UCLA's first game of the 2023 NCAA Division I women's basketball tournament, she scored 14 points in a 67–45 win over 13-seed Sacramento State. She was named to the All-Tournament team.

During the summer of the 2023 offseason, Bessoir's Bruins played an exhibition game against her former TS Jahn München club. Bessoir scored 17 points as the Bruins won in a 126–23 rout. Going into the 2023–24 season, she was an honorable mention on the Preseason All-Pac 12 Team. Bessoir played in just one game during the season, scoring six points and registering four rebounds. Bessoir was set to miss two games during the season to represent Germany at FIBA Women's EuroBasket 2025 Qualifiers. However, during a qualifier match on 9 November, she re-injured the ACL that caused her to miss the entire 2021–22 season. As a result, she missed the rest of the season.

After the 2023–24 season, it was announced that Bessoir would not be returning to UCLA or entering the transfer portal, but instead would return to Germany in hopes of making the women's Olympic roster for the 2024 Summer Olympics. She graduated from UCLA in June.

== National team career ==
Bessoir represents Germany in international competitions. She was on Germany's roster for the FIBA U16 Women's European Championship, helping the team win a silver medal. She was later on Germany's championship-winning roster at the 2018 FIBA U18 Women's European Championship. Bessoir once again competed for Germany at the FIBA U18 Women's European Championship in 2019.

During the summer of 2020, she competed for Germany during the FIBA U20 Women's European Challengers. She averaged 16.2 points, 13.8 rebounds, and 3.0 blocks per game in five games played.

During her final year at UCLA, Bessoir missed two Bruins games to play EuroBasket Women 2025 qualifiers for Germany. However, she suffered a torn ACL during a match.

Bessoir was included on Germany's finalized 12-woman roster for the 2024 Summer Olympics in Paris.

== Career statistics ==
Legend
GP	Games played	GS	Games started	MPG	Minutes per game
FG%	Field goal percentage	3P%	3-point field goal percentage	FT%	Free throw percentage
RPG	Rebounds per game	APG	Assists per game	SPG	Steals per game
BPG	Blocks per game	PPG	Points per game	**Bold**	Career high

Year	Team	GP	GS	MPG	FG%	3P%	FT%	RPG	APG	SPG	BPG	PPG
2020–21	UCLA	22	2	20.6	.407	.294	.489	5.2	1.0	1.0	.7	7.5
2021–22	UCLA	Did not play due to injury										
2022–23	UCLA	**37**	**35**	**25.1**	.413	**.357**	**.742**	**5.8**	1.2	.6	**.9**	**9.4**
2023–24	UCLA	1	0	23.0	**.500**	.333	.500	4.0	**3.0**	**2.0**	.0	6.0
**Career**		60	37	23.4	.412	.339	.590	5.5	1.2	.8	.9	8.6
Statistics retrieved from Sports-Reference.

== Off the court ==
After suffering her ACL injury during the 2023–24 UCLA season, Bessoir co-hosted an art show with Anstey, who was also injured. The art show, dubbed SHE IS: a canvas of strength, beauty and grace, featured a collection of poems and included 11 paintings, a reference to Bessoir's jersey number. The paintings were illustrated by Bessoir, with funds from the art show going toward Bessoir's NIL efforts.
