= 2024–25 Women's Baltic Basketball League Division B =

European women's basketball tournament

Women's Baltic Basketball League Division B
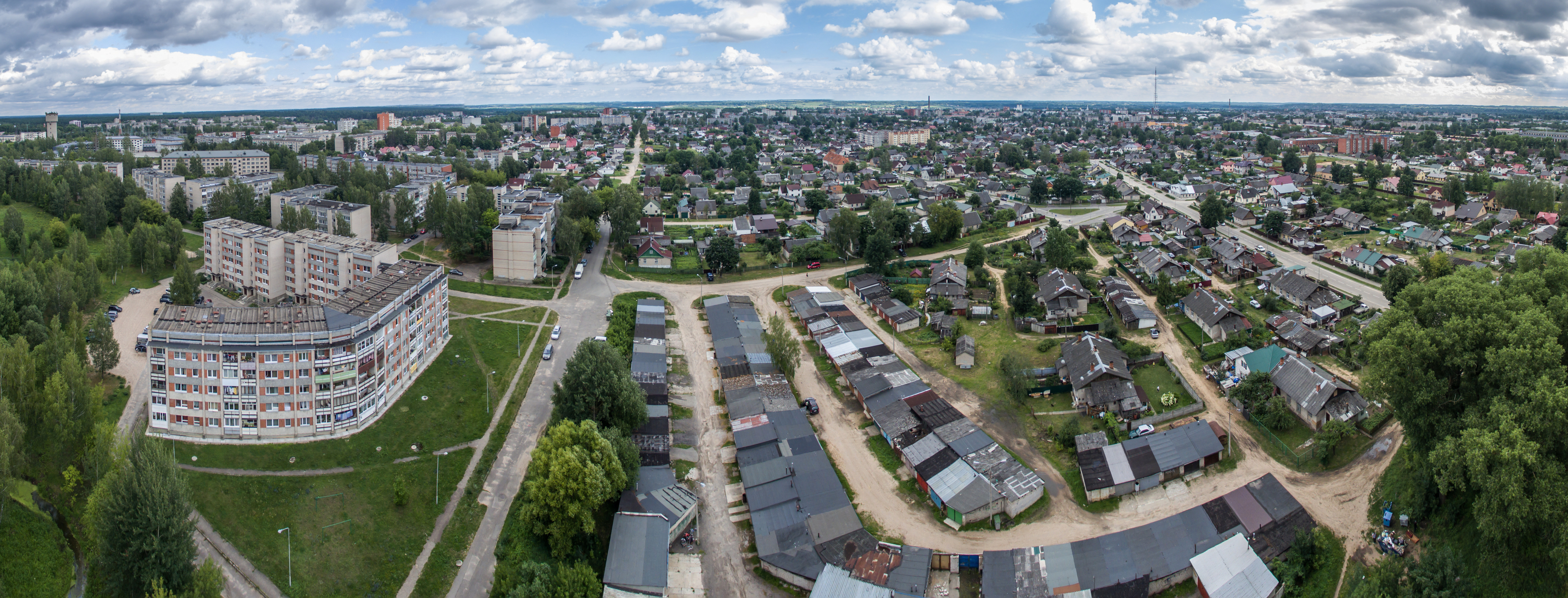
- The final four was held in Daugavpils, Latvia.
- Season: 2024–25
- Dates: Regular season: 8 October 2024 – 10 March 2025; Quarterfinals: 19–22 March 2025; Final four: 29–30 March 2025
- Teams: Total: 7 (from 2 countries)

Finals
- Champions: (Lithuania) MKK Panevėžys (1st title)
- Runners-up: (Lithuania) Aistės-LSMU Kaunas
- Third place: (Latvia) Daugavpils University
- Fourth place: (Latvia) TTT Riga Juniors

Statistical leaders
- Points: (Lithuania) Gabrielė Šulskė (268 points)
- Rebounds: (Lithuania) Kristė Timofejeva (143 rebounds)
- Assists: (Lithuania) Goda Vašurenkaitė (82 assists)

Records
- Biggest home win: TTT Riga Juniors 135–35 KK Atletas Kaunas (10 October 2024)
- Biggest away win: KK Atletas Kaunas 29–136 Aistės-LSMU Kaunas (5 March 2025)
- Highest scoring: Daugavpils University 92–89 MKK Panevėžys (10 October 2025)

The 2024–25 Women's Baltic Basketball League Division B (or the Biosil Women's Baltic Basketball League Division B for sponsorship reasons) is the inaugural season of this competition for the women's teams in the Baltic region.

The winners were MKK Panevėžys who defeated Lithuanian rivals, Aistės-LSMU Kaunas, in the final.

== Format ==
- Regular season

The seven teams all played in a double round robin system. In the end, first place qualifies directly for the final four while the remaining six play in the quarterfinals.

- Quarterfinals

The six teams, except the regular season winners advanced to the quarterfinals which were played in a home and away format where the three aggregate winners advance to the final four.

- Final four

The four remaining teams advanced to the final four to decide the champions. The Final four consisted of two semifinals, a third place game and the final.

== Teams ==
Location of teams in the 2024–25 Women's Baltic Basketball League Division B

Due to the varying strength levels of the teams involved, this is the first season where the teams are split into divisions A and B.

The labels in the parentheses show how each team qualified for the place of its starting round:

- 1st, 2nd, 3rd, etc.: League position of the previous season

Regular season
(Latvia) Daugavpils University (4th)
(Latvia) TTT Riga Juniors (6th)
Latvia U16
(Lithuania) Aistės-LSMU Kaunas (5th)
(Lithuania) MKK Panevėžys (6th)
(Lithuania) Uniclub Bet Oaks Vilnius (Note: Uniclub Bet Oaks Vilnius took part in Division B of the Lithuanian league.)
(Lithuania) KK Atletas Kaunas (Note: KK Atletas Kaunas took part in Division B of the Lithuanian league.)

== Regular season ==
Pos	Team	Pld	W	L	PF	PA	PD	Pts	Qualification	KAU	PAN	TTT	DAU	LAT	VIL	ATL
1	(Lithuania) Aistės-LSMU Kaunas	12	12	0	1158	605	+553	24	Final four	—	63–58	82–61	97–68	114–42	133–42	111–41
2	(Lithuania) MKK Panevėžys	12	9	3	1030	781	+249	21	Quarterfinals	60–104	—	77–72	102–70	82–57	111–44	107–52
3	(Latvia) TTT Riga Juniors	12	8	4	1021	778	+243	20	Quarterfinals	59–67	79–85	—	73–72	89–70	97–53	135–35
4	(Latvia) Daugavpils University	12	7	5	960	882	+78	19	Quarterfinals	60–70	92–89	60–63	—	102–59	69–68	99–40
5	Latvia U16	12	3	9	791	950	−159	15	Quarterfinals	47–102	41–57	66–76	69–85	—	77–66	109–43
6	(Lithuania) Uniclub Bet Oaks Vilnius	12	2	10	727	1035	−308	14	Quarterfinals	38–79	55–84	64–104	83–98	67–49	—	66–72
7	(Lithuania) KK Atletas Kaunas	12	1	11	609	1265	−656	13	Quarterfinals	29–136	52–118	47–113	69–85	67–105	62–81	—

Source: WBBL
Rules for classification: 1) Points; 2) Points difference; 3) Points scored.

== Quarterfinals ==
Team 1	Agg.	Team 2	1st leg	2nd leg
KK Atletas Kaunas (Lithuania)	96–175	(Lithuania) MKK Panevėžys	51–93	45–82
Uniclub Bet Oaks Vilnius (Lithuania)	68–130	(Latvia) TTT Riga Juniors	68–110	0–20
Latvia U16	120–134	(Latvia) Daugavpils University	49–73	71–61

=== Matches ===
19 March 2025
18:00

Boxscore

KK Atletas Kaunas (Lithuania)	51–93	(Lithuania) MKK Panevėžys
Scoring by quarter: 18–22, 0–30, 13–24, 20–17
Pts: Kliuchinikie 24; Rebs: Januševičiūtė 9 Asts: Januševičiūtė, Tamoševičiūtė 4		Pts: Timofejeva 24; Rebs: Bukauskaitė, Vašurenkaitė 8 Asts: Šulskė 6

KA Zalgiris Arena, Kaunas
Attendance: 40

23 March 2025
19:30

Boxscore

MKK Panevėžys (Lithuania)	82–45	(Lithuania) KK Atletas Kaunas
Scoring by quarter: 22–11, 20–14, 21–10, 19–10
Pts: Butvilaitė 14; Rebs: Garčinskaitė 9 Asts: Šulskė, Vašurenkaitė 5		Pts: Kliuchinikie 19; Rebs: Petrėnaitė 10; Asts: Kliuchinikie 4

Kalnapilio Arena, Panevėžys
Attendance: 35

MKK Panevėžys won 175–96 on aggregate

20 March 2025
20:00

Boxscore

Uniclub Bet Oaks Vilnius (Lithuania)	68–110	(Latvia) TTT Riga Juniors
Scoring by quarter: 22–28, 17–25, 13–30, 16–27
Pts: Paplauskaitė 13; Rebs: Prokarenkaitė 13; Asts: Prokarenkaitė 8		Pts: Ploriņa 22; Rebs: Tupalo 9 Asts: Miščenko 5

Savanorių sporto arena, Vilnius
Attendance: 18

Boxscore

TTT Riga Juniors (Latvia)	20–0	(Lithuania) Uniclub Bet Oaks Vilnius
Scoring by quarter: –, –, –, –

Rimi Olympic Centre, Riga

TTT Riga Juniors won 130–68 on aggregate

22 March 2025
16:00

Boxscore

Latvia U16	49–73	(Latvia) Daugavpils University
Scoring by quarter: 10–16, 16–21, 16–18, 7–18
Pts: Sirsniņa 11; Rebs: Vilcāne 9 Asts: Zālīte 2		Pts: Naidjonova 25; Rebs: Bondare 9 Asts: three players 3

Kultūras un sporta pils, Daugavpils
Attendance: 90

23 March 2025
14:00

Boxscore

Daugavpils University (Latvia)	61–71	Latvia U16
Scoring by quarter: 26–14, 7–22, 14–17, 14–18
Pts: Petrova, Naidjonova 16; Rebs: Ošeniece 11; Asts: Petrova, Naidjonova 4		Pts: Omula 16; Rebs: Pētersone 11; Asts: Zālīte 7

Kultūras un sporta pils, Daugavpils

Daugavpils University won 134–120 on aggregate

== Final four ==
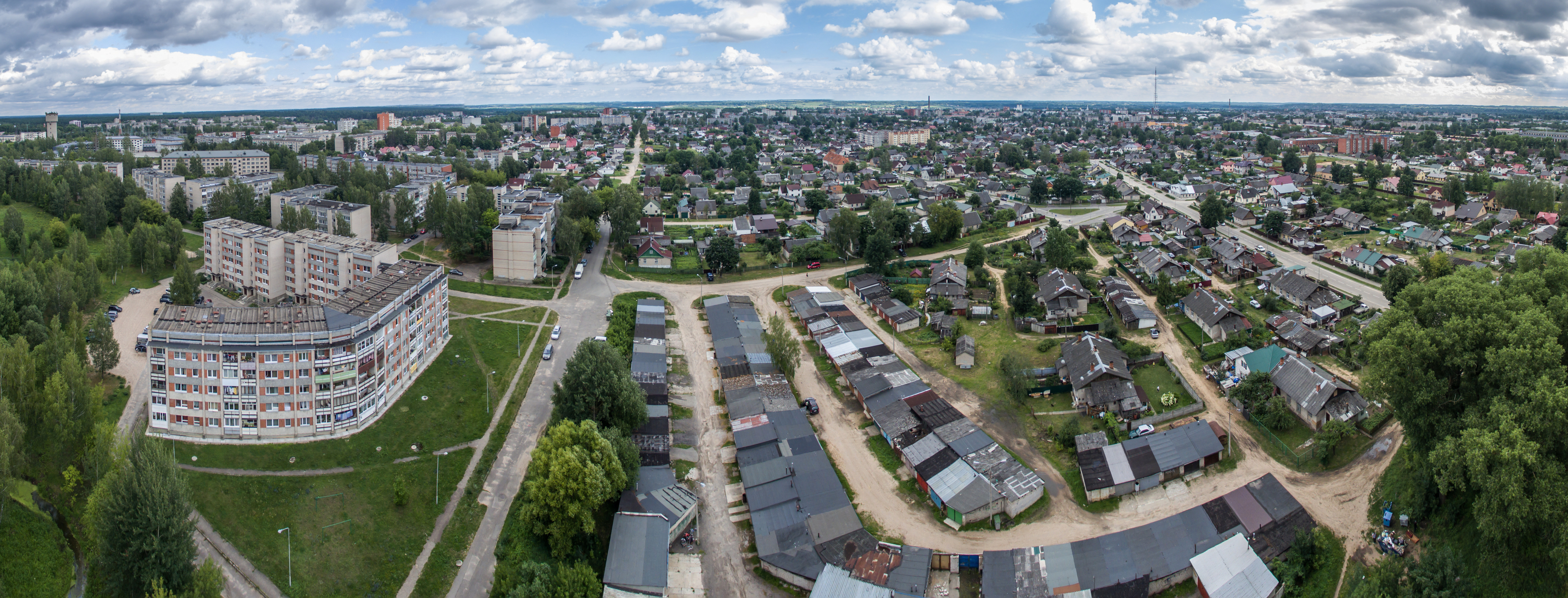
The Kultūras un sporta pils ('Culture and Sports Palace') in Daugavpils hosted the final four.

On 21 March 2025, Daugavpils, Latvia was awarded the hosting rights of the Final four The Kultūras un sporta pils is the venue.

=== Bracket ===
Semifinals
(Lithuania) Aistės-LSMU Kaunas	67
(Latvia) Daugavpils University	59
(Lithuania) MKK Panevėžys	81
(Latvia) TTT Riga Juniors	59

Final
(Lithuania) Aistės-LSMU Kaunas	78
(Lithuania) MKK Panevėžys	88
Third place
(Latvia) Daugavpils University	81
(Latvia) TTT Riga Juniors	77

=== Semifinals ===
29 March 2025
17:00

Boxscore

Daugavpils University (Latvia)	59–67	(Lithuania) Aistės-LSMU Kaunas
Scoring by quarter: 7–18, 10–19, 22–20, 20–10
Pts: Baltace 13; Rebs: Ošeniece 9 Asts: Petrova 8		Pts: Savostaitė 16; Rebs: Savostaitė 16; Asts: Paulauskaitė3

Kultūras un sporta pils, Daugavpils
Attendance: 110

29 March 2025
14:00

Boxscore

TTT Riga Juniors (Latvia)	59–81	(Lithuania) MKK Panevėžys
Scoring by quarter: 20–21, 13–22, 16–23, 10–15
Pts: Hermane 20; Rebs: Millere 4 Asts: Ploriņa, Skrebele 3		Pts: Šulskė 24; Rebs: Bukauskaitė, Timofejeva 12; Asts: Timofejeva 6

Kultūras un sporta pils, Daugavpils

=== Third place game ===
30 March 2025
13:00

Boxscore

TTT Riga Juniors (Latvia)	77–81	(Latvia) Daugavpils University
Scoring by quarter: 26–17, 11–24, 20–16, 20–24
Pts: Skrebele 18; Rebs: Ploriņa 8 Asts: Miščenko 5		Pts: Simonova 23; Rebs: Bondare, Simonova 6 Asts: Petrova 5

Kultūras un sporta pils, Daugavpils
Attendance: 157

=== Final ===
30 March 2025
16:00

Boxscore

MKK Panevėžys (Lithuania)	88–78 (OT)	(Lithuania) Aistės-LSMU Kaunas
Scoring by quarter: 20–19, 10–19, 20–14, 26–24, Overtime: 12–2
Pts: Šulskė 20; Rebs: Timofejeva 17; Asts: Timofejeva 7		Pts: Jurevičiūtė 22; Rebs: Paulauskaitė 8 Asts: Dziatkauskaitė 8

Kultūras un sporta pils, Daugavpils
Attendance: 72

2024–25 Women's Baltic Basketball League Division B Champions

MKK Panevėžys
First title

== See also ==
- 2024–25 Women's Baltic Basketball League
