= Brigita Sinickaitė =

Lithuanian basketball player (born 2001)

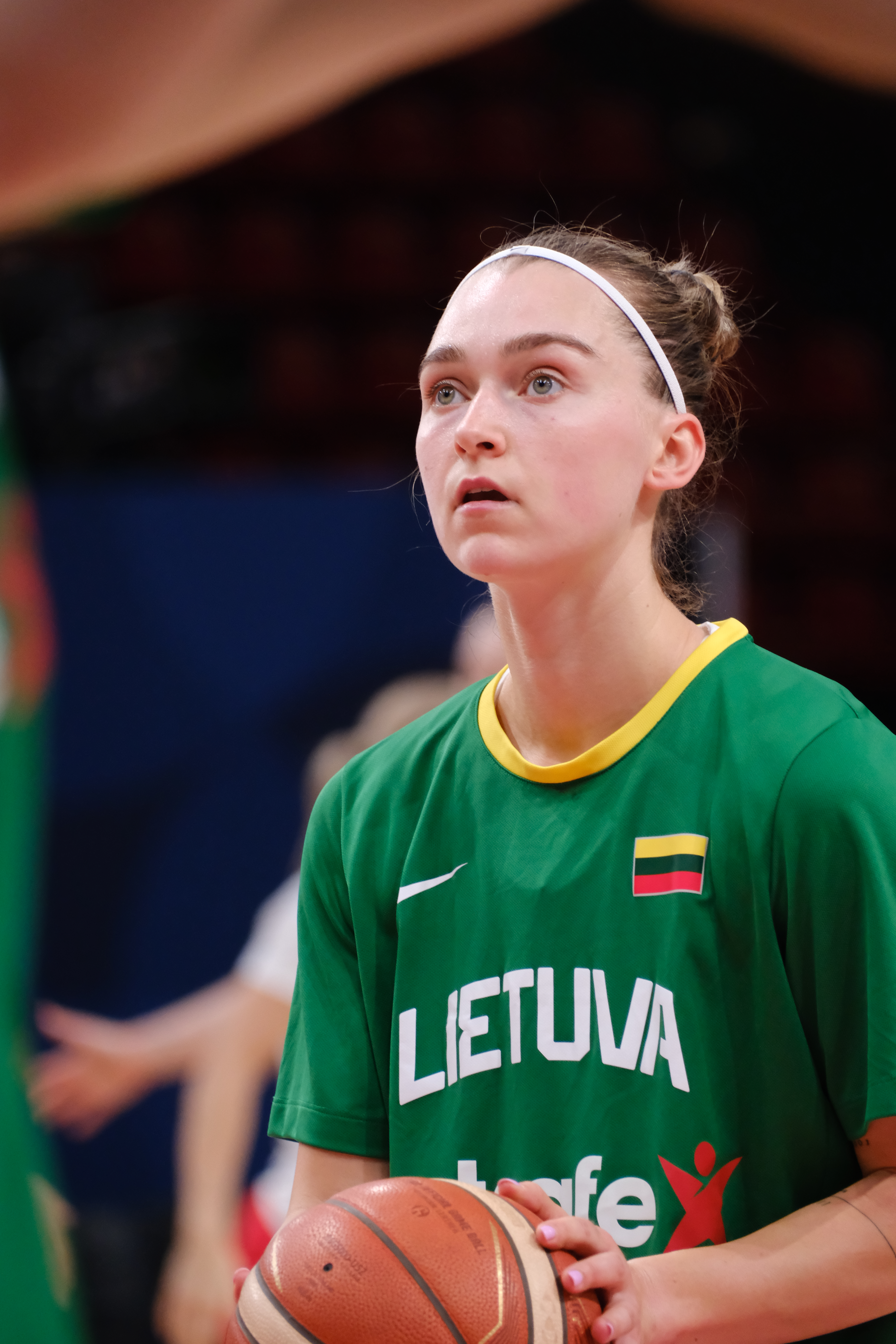
- Sinickaitė with the Lithuania's national team

No. 23 – Neptūnas-Amberton Klaipėda
- Position: Shooting guard
- League: Moterų Lietuvos Krepšinio Lyga

Personal information
- Born: 1 February 2001 (age 25) Šiauliai, Lithuania
- Listed height: 1.73 m (5 ft 8 in)

Career information
- High school: Lieporiai Gymnasium
- Playing career: 2017–present

Career history
- 2017–2019: Šiauliai-Universitetas
- 2020–2022: Aistės-LSMU Kaunas
- 2022–present: Neptūnas-Amberton Klaipėda

Brigita Sinickaitė (born 1 February 2001) is a Lithuanian professional basketball player, who play for the Neptūnas-Amberton Klaipėda of the Moterų Lietuvos Krepšinio Lyga.

== Early life ==
Sinickaitė attended the Lieporiai Gymnasium in her hometown Šiauliai.

== Professional career ==
Sinickaitė played for multiple clubs of the Moterų Lietuvos Krepšinio Lyga: Šiauliai-Universitetas of her hometown Šiauliai, Aistės-LSMU Kaunas and Neptūnas-Amberton Klaipėda.

== National team career ==
Sinickaitė represented the Lithuania youth national teams in the 2016 FIBA U16 Women's European Championship, 2017 FIBA U16 Women's European Championship, 2018 FIBA U18 Women's European Championship Division B (won the tournament), 2019 FIBA U18 Women's European Championship (her best youth tournament statistically, where she averaged 10.6 points, 4 rebounds, 3.7 assists per game).

Sinickaitė debuted in the senior Lithuania women's national basketball team during the EuroBasket Women 2025 qualification and averaged 5.5 points, 2.5 assists, 0.3 steals per game and helped her team to qualify for the EuroBasket Women 2025. She was included into the final roster of the Lithuania's national team during the EuroBasket Women 2025 where she averaged 3.2 points, 2 rebounds, 1.2 assists per game. She also represented Lithuania during the EuroBasket Women 2027 qualification.
