= Sydney Taylor Book Award =

Award for Jewish children's literature

- Awarded for: Outstanding books for children and teens that authentically portray the Jewish experience
- Country: United States
- Presented by: Association of Jewish Libraries
- First award: 1968
- Website: jewishlibraries.org/sydney_taylor_book_award/

The Sydney Taylor Book Award recognizes the best in Jewish children's literature. Medals are awarded annually for outstanding books that authentically portray the Jewish experience. The award was established in 1968 by the Association of Jewish Libraries. It is named in memory of Sydney Taylor, author of the classic All-of-a-Kind Family series. Taylor's were some of the first children's books with Jewish characters that were of literary interest to readers of all backgrounds.

== History ==
The award was first established by the Association of Jewish Libraries in 1968. It was the first of the identity-based awards as a result of Nancy Larrick's 1965 piece The All-White World of Children's Books, establishing new precedent wherein literary excellence is paired with authentic and well-crafted representation of a particular identity, culture, and experience. Originally, it was known as the Shirley Kravitz Children's Book Award and was later renamed in honor of Sydney Taylor in 1978. The award initially recognized books for older children, but in 1981, the award committee started to recognize books for younger readers and in 2007, began to recognize young adult literature. In 1988, Honor Award Winners were added and these books receive a silver seal.

== About ==
Awards are presented in three categories: Younger Readers, Older Readers and Teen Readers. In each category, a single gold medalist is named annually. Each year there may also be several silver medalists named in each category. A list of ten to twenty Notable Children's Books of Jewish Content is also named in each category, but these titles do not receive medals.

The award committee is made up of volunteers from the Association of Jewish Libraries. Books are evaluated based on certain criteria one of which is literary merit. Books must also be appropriate to the age level, rooted in "authentic and accurate detail" and have a positive and/or authentic Jewish religious or cultural content. Books nominated are newly published books for the year. Books can be picture books, non-fiction, fiction and poetry.

=== Criteria ===
- The book has literary merit.
- The book has positive and authentic Jewish religious or cultural content.
- The book is appropriate for the intended grade level in style, vocabulary, format, and illustration.
- Whether fiction or nonfiction, the book is solidly rooted in authentic and accurate detail through scholarship and research by the author.
- Particular attention will be paid to titles that demonstrate the broad diversity of the Jewish experience, including diversity of time period and country of origin.
- Textbooks, liturgy, and reprints are not eligible. Significantly revised editions and re-illustrated editions are eligible.
- Books must be commercially available for purchase in order to be eligible.
- Self-published books are not eligible. The author and illustrator must not have paid any money to the publisher. The book must be edited by a professional editor at no cost to the author/illustrator. The publisher must publish books by multiple authors.
- Books must be published in English (whether originally in English or in translation)
- If the same book is published in English in multiple countries, the first version submitted will be considered for the award. Other versions then become ineligible.

=== Themes ===
Most Sydney Taylor Book Award winning titles are universal in theme while Judaic in specific content, highlighting the diversity of Jewish lives and experiences, traditions, and values to Jewish and non-Jewish readers alike.

== Body-of-Work Award ==
The body-of-work award is given "to recognize an author or entity who has made a substantial contribution over time to the genre of Jewish children's literature." Beginning in 2018, the award became biennial instead of periodic.

== Manuscript Award ==
The Sydney Taylor Manuscript Award for children's books was first awarded in 1985. The winner receives $1,000.
