= Association of Jewish Libraries =

International library organization

The Association of Jewish Libraries (AJL) is an international organization dedicated to the production, collection, organization and dissemination of Judaic resources as a library, media, and information service. AJL has members in the United States, Canada, Israel and over 22 other countries.

It was formed through a 1966 merger of two organizations, the Jewish Librarians Association, founded in 1946, which concerned itself with collections of Judaica in academic, archival or research institutions, and the Jewish Library Association, founded in 1962, which concerned itself with collections in the synagogue, school and community, and several other smaller libraries and media centers.

The organization has various professional development opportunities, including library training webinars. and workshops, mentoring programs and continuing education opportunities. Scholarships are available to members who wish to pursue studies in Judaica and Hebraica librarianship.

== Publications ==
The Association of Jewish Libraries publishes several serials including a scholarly journal Judaica Librarianship and the electronic quarterlies AJL News and AJL Reviews. AJL also has an electronic mailing list called Hasafran, which is Hebrew for "the librarian".

In 2014, Judaica Librarianship became an online journal. Back issues are freely available 12 months after the publication date. The journal seeks to publish research articles and essays related to the development and management of Judaica collections in all types of libraries and archives, the initiation and coordination of digital curation projects, the creation and dissemination of information resources in all formats, and the promotion of Jewish information literacy for diverse audiences through various outreach activities.

== Awards ==
The Association of Jewish Libraries awards the Sydney Taylor Book Award annually for books that authentically portray the Jewish experience in children's literature, the Sydney Taylor Manuscript Award for the most promising unpublished Judaic manuscript for children and the AJL Jewish Fiction Award for works of fiction for adult readers with significant Jewish thematic content.

The Association also awards the Judaica Reference and Bibliography Awards for outstanding scholarly reference works and bibliographies.

== Conferences ==
The AJL Conference, held annually, is a valuable way for Judaica librarians to share ideas, learn, and network with their peers.

=== Locations of past conferences ===
- 2023 (58th) Online
- 2022 (57th) Philadelphia
- 2021 (56th) Online due to Covid-19
- 2020 (55th) Online due to Covid-19
- 2019 (54th) Woodland Hills, California
- 2018 (53rd) Boston
- 2017 (52nd) New York City
- 2016 (51st) Charleston, South Carolina
- 2015 (50th) Washington, D.C.
- 2014 (49th) Las Vegas
- 2013 (48th) Houston
- 2012 (47th) Pasadena, California
- 2011 (46th) Montreal
- 2010 (45th) Seattle
- 2009 (44th) Chicago
- 2008 (43rd) Cleveland
- 2007 (42nd) Phoenix, Arizona
- 2006 (41st) Cambridge, Massachusetts
- 2005 (40th) Oakland, California
- 2004 (39th) Brooklyn
- 2003 (38th) Toronto
- 2002 (37th) Denver
- 2001 (36th) La Jolla, California
- 2000 (35th) Washington, D.C.
- 1999 (34th) Boca Raton, Florida
- 1998 (33rd) Philadelphia
- 1997 (32nd) Cleveland
- 1996 (31st) Toronto
- 1995 (30th) Chicago
- 1994 (29th) Atlanta
- 1993 (28th) New York City
- 1992 (27th) Los Angeles
- 1991 (26th) Miami Beach, Florida
- 1990 (25th) Jerusalem
- 1989 (24th) Washington, D.C.
- 1988 (23rd) Kansas City, Missouri
- 1987 (22nd) Livingston, New Jersey
- 1986 (21st) Montreal
- 1985 (20th) Cleveland
- 1984 (19th) Atlanta
- 1983 (18th) Long Beach, California
- 1982 (17th) Columbus, Ohio
- 1981 (16th) Liberty, New York
- 1980 (15th) Philadelphia
- 1979 (14th) Cincinnati
- 1978 (13th) San Francisco
- 1977 (12th) Waltham, Massachusetts
- 1976 (11th) Montreal
- 1975 (10th) Miami Beach, Florida
- 1974 (9th) Chicago
- 1973 (8th) Los Angeles
- 1972 (7th) Toronto
- 1971 (6th) Jerusalem
- 1970 (5th) New York City
- 1969 (4th) Atlantic City, New Jersey
- 1968 (3rd) Cincinnati
- 1967 (2nd) Boston
- 1966 (1st) Philadelphia

== American Library Association ==
The Association of Jewish Libraries is an affiliate of the American Library Association.
