= All-of-a-Kind Family =

1951 children's book by Sydney Taylor

- Author: Sydney Taylor
- Illustrator: Helen John
- Language: English
- Genre: Children's novel
- Publisher: Follett Publishing Company
- Publication date: 1951
- Publication place: United States
- Media type: Print
- Pages: 149 pp
- ISBN: 0440400597
- Followed by: More All-of-a-Kind Family

All-of-a-Kind Family is a 1951 children's book by Sydney Taylor about a family of five American Jewish girls growing up on the Lower East Side of New York City in 1912. It was followed by four sequels.

== Background ==
All-of-a-Kind Family is based on Sydney Taylor's recollections of her childhood on Manhattan's Lower East Side, where her family settled along with many other Jewish families after migrating from Eastern Europe by way of Germany. The main characters are named for Taylor's real-life sisters, Ella, Henny, Charlotte, and Gertrude, and the middle sister was given the author's birth name, Sarah.

The book's genesis was stories of her childhood that Taylor would tell her daughter, Jo. Taylor wrote:

"I took my daughter Jo down to the old neighborhood where Papa, Mama and the five little girls had lived. But the past was dead there; it lived only in me. I decided to write it all down for Jo. Perhaps in this way I could re-create for both of us some feeling of that other life."

While Taylor wrote All-of-a-Kind Family for her daughter, by some accounts she had no plans to publish the story. But, the story goes, her husband secretly submitted the manuscript for the Charles W. Follett Award in 1951, and it won, launching Taylor's career and what would become a five-book series.

The book is noteworthy for its depiction of a joint Jewish American identity, with the characters expressing both pride in their Jewish traditions and American patriotism, following the trajectory of Taylor's own family's assimilation. "Not only are Jewish customs explained honestly and frankly, but Taylor makes them attractive and positive, drawing in her readers, both Jewish and non-Jewish," the scholar June Cummins writes.

== Plot ==
Ella, Henny, Sarah, Charlotte, and Gertrude are five sisters growing up on the Lower East Side of Manhattan in 1912. The sisters are nicknamed the "all-of-a-kind family" because of their matching clothes and because they are all two years apart in age. Ella is 12; Henny, 10; Sarah, 8; Charlotte, 6; and Gertie, 4. The book follows them through a year of their childhood as they deal with mundane chores, find joy in eating candy in bed and collecting used books from their father's junk shop, recover from scarlet fever, and celebrate Jewish holidays such as Purim and Sukkot as well as the Fourth of July. They also inadvertently help their father's friend Charlie solve a mystery from his past and, in the end, welcome a new family member.

== Main characters ==
- Ella: The oldest of the five sisters, age 12, born 1900. She is based on the author's own eldest sister of the same name.
- Henrietta "Henny": The second sister, age 10, born 1902. She is the most wild and mischievous one. She is the only one whose hair is blonde and curly.
- Sarah: The third sister, and the author's avatar. Age 8, born 1904, as she was based on the author herself. She is the most practical and levelheaded one who values her education.
- Charlotte: The fourth sister with her head in the clouds, age 6, born 1906. She is the most imaginative one of the sisters.
- Gertrude "Gertie": The youngest of the five sisters, age 4, born 1908. Gertie looks up to Charlotte.
- Mama: The girls' mother, a resourceful homemaker.
- Papa: The girls' father, who runs a junk shop. He has several brothers.
- Kathy Allen: A kind librarian at the local library who befriends the girls. She is Charlie Graham's lost sweetheart.
- Herbert "Charlie" Graham: Papa's good non-Jewish friend, a junk peddler with a mysterious past whom Ella is secretly infatuated with. He is Kathy Allen's lost sweetheart.

== Sequels ==
Taylor followed All-of-a-Kind Family with four sequels: More All-of-a-Kind Family, All-of-a-Kind Family Downtown, All-of-a-Kind Family Uptown, and Ella of All-of-a-Kind Family. The final novel was published shortly after Taylor's death in 1978. In 2018 a picture book sequel called All-of-a-Kind Family Hanukkah written by Emily Jenkins and illustrated by Paul O. Zelinsky was named a Kirkus best book of 2018 and won the Sydney Taylor Book Award for Younger Readers in 2019.

The series chronicles the sisters' lives from 1912 to 1919. All-of-a-Kind Family Downtown, which chronologically comes between All-of-a-Kind Family and More All-of-a-Kind Family, was published after More All-of-a-Kind Family. In More All-of-a-Kind Family, the family befriends an immigrant woman named Lena after she saves the life of their baby brother, Charlie. With the girls' encouragement, Lena becomes engaged to the girls' uncle, Hyman; they marry soon after she tragically becomes disabled due to polio. The book ends with the family moving away from the Lower East Side to a more ethnically diverse area of the city.

In All-of-a-Kind Family Downtown, the girls befriend an impoverished Italian boy named Guido, whose mother later dies from tuberculosis. They explore the local settlement house and get used to life with baby Charlie. In All-of-a-Kind Family Uptown, the girls face new challenges related to their entering adolescence, such as managing the house when their mother falls ill, Ella's boyfriend joining the military during World War I, and Sarah's apprehension about graduating from eighth grade. Ella of All-of-a-Kind Family takes place post-World War I and focuses mainly on Ella, as she must choose between her acting career and marrying her boyfriend, Jules.

== Political influences ==
June Cummins noted that Taylor's involvement in socialist and progressive organizations as a young woman influenced her writing, particularly the sequels to All-of-a-Kind Family. Although Taylor was initially pressured by her editors to include the Americanization of the family to balance out themes of Jewishness and immigrant experiences, she gradually began hinting at her progressive views in the All-of-a-Kind Family books. The parents' sympathetic approaches to mischievous Henny's misbehavior represents the softening of authoritarianism in family structures. Additionally, Cummins viewed Ella's pursuit of a career in acting and dancing places as an explicitly feminist choice, as well as Henny's campaign for her high school's government (both storylines occur in Ella-of-All-of-a-Kind Family).

== Awards and legacy ==
Taylor received the Charles W. Follett Award for All-of-a-Kind Family's contribution to children's literature in 1951. All-of-a-Kind Family was also the first recipient of the Jewish Book Council's National Jewish Book Award for children's literature in 1952. The book is considered foundational to the development of American Jewish children's literature, and the Association of Jewish Libraries' annual children's literature award is named the Sydney Taylor Book Award in honor of Taylor's work. The publisher Lizzie Skurnick, who reissued the All-of-a-Kind sequels, describes Taylor's depiction of American Jewish life as "completely singular. They’re the first series about a Jewish family ever, one that’s not only about the family, but about Jewish culture, New York, the turn of the century, vaudeville, polio, the rise of technology."

Cummins wrote that "Taylor was a transformational figure … in American Jewish life" whose work involved "enlarging the public's understanding and increasing its acceptance of American Jews."
