= Urtė Čižauskaitė =

Lithuanian basketball player

No. 10 – Lattes Montepellier
- Position: Forward/Power forward
- League: Ligue Féminine de Basketball

Personal information
- Born: 30 January 2003 (age 23) Kaunas, Lithuania
- Listed height: 1.87 m (6 ft 2 in)

Career information
- Playing career: 2018–present

Career history
- 2018–2020: Žalgiris Kaunas (Lithuania)
- 2020–present: Lattes Montpellier
Medals
Women's basketball
Representing Lithuania
FIBA Europe Under-16 Women's Championship
Silver medal – second place	2019 North Macedonia	Team competition

Urtė Čižauskaitė (born 30 January 2003) is a Lithuanian professional basketball player for Lattes Montpellier women's club in the Ligue Féminine de Basketball. She plays at the forward and power forward positions.

== Early life ==
Urtė Čižauskaitė was born in Kaunas, Lithuania. Inspired by her mother, Sandra Čižauskienė—a former European professional player and coach—she took up basketball. She began playing under the coaching of her mother, on Kauno Aisčiai's team.

== Professional career ==
In 2018 she joined the Žalgiris Kaunas of the Lithuanian Women's Basketball League. After two seasons, she left the club for France, where she signed with Lattes Montpellier, her current team. During her first season in France in 2021, she won the French National Women's Cup.

== International career ==
At 14, Čižauskaitė played with the U16s Lithuanian national team. During 2019, she competed in the U16 European Championship, in North Macedonia, averaging 9.4 points and 11.4 rebounds. She registered two big performances, against the French team (15 points, 18 rebounds and 3 blocks), and against the Czech Republic team (17 points, 17 rebounds, 2 blocks and 2 steals). The Lithuanian team won the silver medal that year. She was named to the Top 10 of the best players in the competition.

The same summer, she played with the U18s Lithuanian national team in the U18 European Championship, in Bosnia and Herzegovina, where she average 6.3 points and 7.3 over nine games. In summer 2020, she was called for the first time to the Lithuanian senior national team. She continued to play with two national teams, the U18s and the seniors.

== Clubs ==
Season	Club	Country
2018–2020	Žalgiris Kaunas	Lithuania
2020–	Lattes Montpellier	France

== Honors and awards ==
=== International ===
- Silver Medal at FIBA Europe Under-16 Women's Championship

=== Club ===
- Champion of French National Women's Cup in 2021

=== Individual ===
- Top 10 best players of FIBA Europe Under-16 Women's Championship
