= Sydney Taylor =

American writer (1904–1978)

- Born: Sarah Brenner; October 30, 1904; New York City, New York, US
- Died: February 12, 1978 (aged 73)
- Occupation: Writer
- Spouse: Ralph Schneider
- Children: 1

Sydney Taylor (October 30, 1904 – February 12, 1978) was an American writer, known for her series of children's books about a Jewish-American family in New York during the early 20th century. Her first book won the Charles W. Follett Award in children's literature.

== Early life and education ==
She was born Sarah Brenner on October 30, 1904, in New York City to Cecilia (née Marowitz) and Morris Brenner, Jewish immigrants from Germany. Her parents and eldest sister Ella had emigrated in 1901 to the United States and settled on the Lower East Side of Manhattan. Taylor was the third of the five daughters who would become characters in her later books: Ella, Henrietta, Sarah, Charlotte, and Gertrude. She had three younger brothers. German was the first language of the Brenner children, although they spoke English among themselves and outside of the home.

The Brenner family moved from the Lower East Side to the Bronx in 1916, where Taylor attended Morris High School. Correspondence saved by Taylor indicates that she requested to be called Sydney, or Sid, in high school. (Note: In letters to her fans later in life, Taylor would claim that she changed her name to Sydney when she joined a theater group because she felt "Sarah" was "unglamorous".)

== Early career ==
Taylor left high school after two years to work while attending business school at night. In 1923, Taylor joined the Young People's Socialist League, motivated as much by social interests as political ones, where she met her future husband, Ralph Schneider. As a young adult, she attended Rand School of Social Science and vacationed several times at Tamiment, a socialist resort in Pennsylvania.

Taylor and her husband, Ralph Schneider, joined the Lenox Hill Players, an experimental theater troupe, from 1927 to 1929. Taylor worked with publicity for the troupe as well as appearing on stage in several roles. When the troupe shut down for lack of funds, the couple joined the Impromptu Theater run by Jacob Moreno. Taylor then studied under Martha Graham for several years, appearing several times in Graham's dances, Heretic and Primitive Mysteries. She continued to earn a living as an office worker during the day.

Her summers were spent as counselor and administrator at Cejwin Camps in Port Jervis, New York, where she was known as "Aunt Syd". Most of her sisters worked at the camp as well. Taylor and her sister Ella wrote, choreographed, and directed theatrical productions at the camp. Taylor would spend summers working at Cejwin up until the summer before her death.

== Writing career ==
Her stories based on life in her large, Jewish family are chronicled in a set of five books known as the All-of-a-Kind Family series. "During the second half of the twentieth century [the books in the series] were the most widely known books about American Jewish children."

In 1950, her husband submitted one of Taylor's manuscripts of stories about her early childhood to a contest for children's literature. The contest sponsor, Wilcox & Follett, awarded Taylor the second annual Charles W. Follett Award in children's literature, which included a publishing contract. Although All-of-a-Kind Family was one of the first children's books specifically about Jewish children, initial marketing of the book avoided using the word "Jewish", as did the book reviews after publication. Child Life magazine selected All-of-a-Kind Family as one of the ten best children's books of 1951.

Taylor submitted another manuscript to her editor at Wilcox & Follett, who advised her to put it away, saying "it might ruin your career". She then tried to write about teenagers, but her magazine submissions were rejected several times and her book editor again advised her against pursuing that avenue. A sequel to All-of-a-Kind Family was also rejected. Taylor then wrote More All-of-a-Kind Family, set in 1915, which was accepted for publication in 1954. All-of-a-Kind Family Uptown, set in 1917, followed in 1956, but was not published until 1958 because the illustrator had other commitments. Meanwhile, her editor continued to reject other manuscripts from Taylor, such as a novel about dancers and choreographers.

After publishing All-of-a-Kind Family, Taylor wrote All-of-a-Kind Family Downtown, which was set in 1915, however publishers rejected it initially. Chronologically, All-of-a-Kind Family Downtown takes place third in the series, but was published fourth. The Downtown book introduced more unpleasant aspects of Lower East Side life, such as poverty, disease, and hunger, to which Taylor's editor objected in a book for children. All-of-a-Kind Family Downtown would not be published until 1972, after Taylor's original editor at Wilcox & Follett retired.

Taylor's book A Papa Like Everyone Else was written based on stories told to her by a close friend, as she was dying from cancer, about her childhood in Hungary. Reviewers gave it a generally lukewarm reception. The other books that she published in the 1960s, not part of the All-of-a-Kind Family series, were not particularly memorable. Now That You Are 8 was written by commission for a Now That You Are series through the Child Study Association and the Association Press/YMCA. Taylor's The Dog Who Came to Dinner included African-Americans in the illustrations at her editor's suggestion. Her publisher rejected both a sequel to Mr. Barney's Beard and another All-of-a-Kind Family book, and Taylor was reluctant to take her editor's advice to write problem novels. Taylor's magazine sales continued through the 1960s, but she was unable to find a publisher for a collection of her short stories. The collection, Danny Loves a Holiday, was not published until 1980.

The final book in the series, Ella of All-of-a-Kind Family, was sold to E. P. Dutton in 1977, and was published in the spring of 1978, shortly after Taylor's death.

== Personal life ==
Taylor married Ralph Schneider in July, 1925 at city hall. Because of their families' objections to the civil ceremony, Taylor continued to live with her parents until she and Ralph had a religious wedding two years later. Schneider changed his name to Taylor sometime after 1930. Their daughter Jo Taylor Marshall was born on January 25, 1935.

== Death and legacy ==
Taylor died of cancer at age 73. Her husband established The Sydney Taylor Book Award in her honor in 1978.

== Awards ==
- Charles W. Follett Award in children's literature (1951)
- Isaac Siegel Memorial Award for best Jewish juvenile literature in English (1952)
- National Jewish Book Award for All-of-a-Kind Family (1952)
- Golden Pen Playwriting Contest of 1956, honorable mention for Taylor's play, In God's Hands
- Boys Club of America Junior Award for Mr. Barney's Beard (1961)
- Sydney Taylor Body-of-Work Award from the Association of Jewish Libraries (1979)

== Works ==
- All-of-a-Kind Family (1951), illustrated by Helen John
- More All-Of-A-Kind Family (1954), illustrated by Mary Stevens
- All-of-a-Kind Family Uptown (1958), illustrated by Mary Stevens
- Mr. Barney's Beard (1961), illustrated by Charles Geer
- Now That You Are 8 (1963), illustrated by Ingrid Fetz
- The Dog Who Came to Dinner (1966), illustrated by John E. Johnson
- A Papa Like Everyone Else (1966), illustrated by George Porter
- All-of-a-Kind Family Downtown (1972), illustrated by Beth and Joe Krush
- Ella of All-of-a-Kind Family (1978), illustrated by Gail Owens
- Danny Loves a Holiday (1980), illustrated by Gail Owens

Upon the one-hundredth anniversary of the author's birth, in 2004, the Association of Jewish Libraries issued The All-of-A-Kind-Family Companion.

In 2014, Lizzie Skurnick of Lizzie Skurnick Books began to reissue the four sequels. More All-Of-A-Kind Family was released on June 10 and All-Of-A-Kind Family Uptown was released on July 15. June Cummins wrote the forewords for the new editions.
