= Spanish Basketball Federation =

Spanish basketball governing body

- Sport: Basketball
- Jurisdiction: Spain
- Founded: 1923
- Affiliation: FIBA
- Affiliation date: 1934
- Regional affiliation: FIBA Europe
- Headquarters: Madrid
- President: Elisa Aguilar
- Men's coach: Chus Mateo
- Women's coach: Miguel Méndez

Official website
- www.feb.es
- (Spain)

The Spanish Basketball Federation (Spanish: Federación Española de Baloncesto; FEB) is the governing body of basketball in Spain. Based in Madrid, it was founded on 31 July 1923 in Barcelona, Spain.

It organizes all the female national competitions (Liga Femenina (1st), Liga Femenina 2 (2nd), Copa de la Reina and Supercopa de España), and three of the four male nation-wide leagues (Primera FEB (2nd), Segunda FEB (3rd) and Tercera FEB (4th)), while oversees the 1st tier, Liga ACB.

It is also responsible for appointing the management of the men's, women's, and youth national basketball teams. As of 2023, the federation has 3,069 registered clubs and 411,885 federated basketball players, being the second biggest federation after the Football Federation.

== Competitions ==
FEB national competitions:

- Men's competitions:
  - Primera FEB (2nd)
  - Segunda FEB (3rd)
  - Tercera FEB (4th)
  - Copa España
- Women's competitions:
  - Liga Femenina (1st)
  - Liga Femenina 2 (2nd)
  - Copa de la Reina
  - Supercopa de España

== Honours ==
=== Senior national teams ===
==== Men ====
Olympics
Silver Medal	3	1984, 2008, 2012
Bronze Medal	1	2016
FIBA World Cup
Winner	2	2006, 2019
EuroBasket
Winner	4	2009, 2011, 2015, 2022
Runner-up	6	1935, 1973, 1983, 1999, 2003, 2007
Third place	4	1991, 2001, 2013, 2017

==== Women ====
Olympics
Silver Medal	1	2016
FIBA World Cup
Runner-up	1	2014
Third place	3	2010, 2018, 2026
EuroBasket Women
Winner	4	1993, 2013, 2017, 2019
Runner-up	3	2007, 2023, 2025
Third place	5	2001, 2003, 2005, 2009, 2015

=== Youth national teams ===
==== Men ====
FIBA U-19 World Cup
Winner	2	1999, 2023
Third place	1	1995
FIBA U-17 World Cup
Runner-up	1	2022
FIBA U20 EuroBasket
Winner	3	2011, 2016, 2022
Runner-up	6	1996, 2002, 2007, 2014, 2015, 2019
Third place	8	1994, 2000, 2008, 2009, 2010, 2012, 2013, 2026
FIBA U18 EuroBasket
Winner	6	1998, 2004, 2011, 2019, 2022, 2025
Runner-up	4	1974, 1978, 2017, 2023
Third place	5	1976, 1990, 1994, 2006, 2013
FIBA U16 EuroBasket
Winner	6	2006, 2009, 2013, 2016, 2019, 2023
Runner-up	9	1973, 1983, 1985, 1993, 1995, 2007, 2018, 2022, 2024
Third place	7	1979, 1991, 2001, 2005, 2011, 2014, 2026

==== Women ====
FIBA U-19 World Cup
Runner-up	3	2009, 2011, 2023
Third place	2	2019, 2025
FIBA U-17 World Cup
Runner-up	4	2012, 2014, 2022, 2026
Third place	1	2024
FIBA U20 Women's EuroBasket
Winner	10	2007, 2011, 2012, 2013, 2015, 2016, 2017, 2018, 2022, 2025
Runner-up	4	2009, 2010, 2014, 2024
Third place	2	2023, 2026
FIBA U18 Women's EuroBasket
Winner	7	1998, 2006, 2009, 2013, 2015, 2025, 2026
Runner-up	10	1990, 1994, 2004, 2005, 2007, 2010, 2016, 2018, 2022, 2024
Third place	3	2011, 2014, 2023
FIBA U16 Women's EuroBasket
Winner	12	1999, 2004, 2005, 2006, 2008, 2009, 2011, 2012, 2013, 2016, 2025, 2026
Runner-up	4	1993, 2007, 2022, 2023
Third place	4	2014, 2018, 2019, 2024

== All-time participation table ==
Combined table of men's and women's basketball teams, both senior and youth teams. Not included two discontinued competitions: Men's U-21 World Championship (three participations in four editions) and Women's U-21 World Championship for Women (one participation in two editions). Not included either, Mediterranean Games.

	Men's national teams									Women's national teams								
	Europe U-16	World U-17	Europe U-18	World U-19	Europe U-20	Euro Basket	World Cup	Olympics		Olympics	World Cup	Euro Basket	Europe U-20	World U-19	Europe U-18	World U-17	Europe U-16	
2027	q		q	q	q		tbd		2027			tbd	q	q	q		q	2027
2026	Bronze medal	DNQ	4th		Bronze medal				2026		Bronze medal		Bronze medal		Gold medal	Silver medal	Gold medal	2026
2025	8th		Gold medal	DNQ	8th	17th			2025			Silver medal	Gold medal	Bronze medal	Gold medal		Gold medal	2025
2024	Bronze medal	7th	13th		7th			10th	2024	5th			Silver medal		Silver medal	Bronze medal	Bronze medal	2024
2023	Gold medal		Silver medal	Gold medal	10th		9th		2023			Silver medal	Bronze medal	Silver medal	Bronze medal		Silver medal	2023
2022	Silver medal	Silver medal	Gold medal		Gold medal	Gold medal			2022		DNQ		Gold medal		Silver medal	Silver medal	Silver medal	2022
2021				5th		↑		6th	2021	6th		7th		7th				2021
2019	Gold medal		Gold medal	DNQ	Silver medal		Gold medal		2019			Gold medal	5th	Bronze medal	5th		Bronze medal	2019
2018	Silver medal	DNQ	9th		7th				2018		Bronze medal		Gold medal		Silver medal	6th	Bronze medal	2018
2017	8th		Silver medal	4th	4th	Bronze medal			2017			Gold medal	Gold medal	8th	6th		5th	2017
2016	Gold medal	4th	5th		Gold medal			Bronze medal	2016	Silver medal			Gold medal		Silver medal	6th	Gold medal	2016
2015	4th		7th	8th	Silver medal	Gold medal			2015			Bronze medal	Gold medal	4th	Gold medal		4th	2015
2014	Bronze medal	4th	5th		Silver medal		5th		2014		Silver medal		Silver medal		Bronze medal	Silver medal	Bronze medal	2014
2013	Gold medal		Bronze medal	5th	Bronze medal	Bronze medal			2013			Gold medal	Gold medal	4th	Gold medal		Gold medal	2013
2012	7th	4th	5th		Bronze medal			Silver medal	2012	DNQ			Gold medal		5th	Silver medal	Gold medal	2012
2011	Bronze medal		Gold medal	DNQ	Gold medal	Gold medal			2011			9th	Gold medal	Silver medal	Bronze medal		Gold medal	2011
2010	4th	10th	11th		Bronze medal		6th		2010		Bronze medal		Silver medal		Silver medal	8th	4th	2010
2009	Gold medal		5th	10th	Bronze medal	Gold medal			2009			Bronze medal	Silver medal	Silver medal	Gold medal		Gold medal	2009
2008	6th		5th		Bronze medal			Silver medal	2008	5th			4th		5th		Gold medal	2008
2007	Silver medal		5th	8th	Silver medal	Silver medal			2007			Silver medal	Gold medal	4th	Silver medal		Silver medal	2007
2006	Gold medal		Bronze medal		11th		Gold medal		2006		8th		4th		Gold medal		Gold medal	2006
2005	Bronze medal		4th		9th	4th			2005			Bronze medal	8th	5th	Silver medal		Gold medal	2005
2004	7th		Gold medal		11th			7th	2004	6th			9th		Silver medal		Gold medal	2004
2003	4th			DNQ		Silver medal			2003			Bronze medal					4th	2003
2002			9th		Silver medal		5th		2002		5th		5th		5th			2002
2001	Bronze medal					Bronze medal			2001			Bronze medal		DNQ			7th	2001
2000			11th		Bronze medal			9th	2000	DNQ			5th		6th			2000
1999	8th			Gold medal		Silver medal			1999			DNQ					Gold medal	1999
1998			Gold medal		4th		5th		1998		5th				Gold medal			1998
1997	6th					5th			1997			5th		8th			5th	1997
1996			9th		Silver medal			DNQ	1996	DNQ					4th			1996
1995	Silver medal			Bronze medal		6th			1995			9th					4th	1995
1994			Bronze medal		Bronze medal		10th		1994		8th				Silver medal			1994
1993	Silver medal					5th			1993			Gold medal		DNQ			Silver medal	1993
1992			6th		6th			9th	1992	5th					5th			1992
1991	Bronze medal			6th		Bronze medal			1991			DNQ					9th	1991
1990			Bronze medal				10th		1990		DNQ				Silver medal			1990
1989	6th					5th			1989			DNQ		5th			4th	1989
1988			6th					8th	1988	DNQ					6th			1988
1987	4th			DNQ		4th			1987			6th					9th	1987
1986			5th				5th		1986		DNQ				12th			1986
1985	Silver medal					4th			1985			10th		7th			9th	1985
1984			4th					Silver medal	1984	DNQ					4th		7th	1984
1983	Silver medal			4th		Silver medal			1983		DNQ	11th			8th			1983
1982			6th				4th		1982								8th	1982
1981	9th					4th			1981			DNQ			9th			1981
1980			4th					4th	1980	DNQ		10th					10th	1980
1979	Bronze medal			DNQ		6th			1979		DNQ				DNQ			1979
1978			Silver medal				DNQ		1978			11th					11th	1978
1977	5th					9th			1977						11th			1977
1976			Bronze medal					DNQ	1976	DNQ		10th					10th	1976
1975	5th					4th			1975		DNQ				6th			1975
1974			Silver medal				5th		1974			12th						1974
1973	Silver medal					Silver medal			1973						8th			1973
1972			7th					11th	1972			DNQ						1972
1971	4th					7th			1971		DNQ				DNQ			1971
1970			5th				DNQ		1970			DNQ						1970
1969						5th			1969						DNQ			1969
1968			5th					7th	1968			DNQ						1968
1967						6th	DNQ		1967		DNQ				DNQ			1967
1966			6th						1966			DNQ						1966
1965						11th			1965						DNQ			1965
1964			8th					DNQ	1964		DNQ	DNQ						1964
1963						7th	DNQ		1963									1963
1962									1962			DNQ						1962
1961						13th			1961									1961
1960								11th	1960			DNQ						1960
1959						15th	DNQ		1959		DNQ							1959
1958									1958			DNQ						1958
1957						DNQ			1957		DNQ							1957
1956								DNQ	1956			DNQ						1956
1955						DNQ			1955									1955
1954							DNQ		1954			DNQ						1954
1953						DNQ			1953		DNQ							1953
1952								DNQ	1952			DNQ						1952
1951						DNQ			1951									1951
1950							9th		1950			DNQ						1950
1949						DNQ			1949									1949
1948								DNQ	1948									1948
1947						DNQ			1947									1947
1946						DNQ			1946									1946
1939						DNE			1939									1939
1938									1938			DNE						1938
1937						DNE			1937									1937
1936								WITHDREW	1936									1936
1935						Silver medal			1935									1935

== All-time medallists ==
Combined table of men's and women's medal winners, with both senior and youth teams, also including medals won in the 3x3 format, as recognized by the Spanish Basketball Federation:

- **Bold** denotes players still playing international basketball.

Player	Medals	Details
Laura Gil	17	Extended content: 2007 FIBA Europe Under-16 Championship (youth); 2008 FIBA Europe Under-16 Championship (youth); 2009 FIBA Europe Under-18 Championship (youth); 2009 FIBA Under-19 World Championship (youth); 2010 FIBA Europe Under-20 Championship (youth); 2010 FIBA Europe Under-18 Championship (youth); 2011 FIBA Europe Under-20 Championship (youth); 2011 FIBA Under-19 World Championship (youth); 2012 FIBA Europe Under-20 Championship (youth); 2013 Eurobasket; 2014 World Championship; 2015 Eurobasket; 2016 Summer Olympics; 2017 Eurobasket; 2018 World Cup; 2019 Eurobasket; 2023 Eurobasket
**Alba Torrens**	16	Extended content: 2004 FIBA Europe Under-16 Championship (youth); 2005 FIBA Europe Under-16 Championship (youth); 2006 FIBA Europe Under-18 Championship (youth); 2007 FIBA Europe Under-18 Championship (youth); 2009 FIBA Europe Under-20 Championship (youth); 2009 Eurobasket; 2010 World Championship; 2013 Eurobasket; 2014 World Championship; 2015 Eurobasket; 2016 Summer Olympics; 2017 Eurobasket; 2018 World Cup; 2023 Eurobasket; 2025 Eurobasket; 2026 World Cup
Pau Gasol	14	Extended content: 1998 FIBA Europe Under-18 Championship (youth); 1999 FIBA Under-19 World Championship (youth); 2000 FIBA Europe Under-20 Championship (youth); 2001 EuroBasket; 2003 EuroBasket; 2006 FIBA World Championship; 2007 EuroBasket; 2008 Summer Olympics; 2009 EuroBasket; 2011 EuroBasket; 2012 Summer Olympics; 2015 EuroBasket; 2016 Summer Olympics; 2017 EuroBasket
Laura Nicholls	14	Extended content: 2004 FIBA Europe Under-16 Championship (youth); 2005 FIBA Europe Under-16 Championship (youth); 2006 FIBA Europe Under-18 Championship (youth); 2007 FIBA Europe Under-18 Championship (youth); 2009 FIBA Europe Under-20 Championship (youth); 2009 Eurobasket; 2010 World Championship; 2013 Eurobasket; 2014 World Championship; 2015 Eurobasket; 2016 Summer Olympics; 2017 Eurobasket; 2018 World Cup; 2019 Eurobasket
Laia Palau	13	Extended content: 2001 Mediterranean Games; 2003 Eurobasket; 2005 Eurobasket; 2007 Eurobasket; 2009 Eurobasket; 2010 World Championship; 2013 Eurobasket; 2014 World Championship; 2015 Eurobasket; 2016 Summer Olympics; 2017 Eurobasket; 2018 World Cup; 2019 Eurobasket
Felipe Reyes	13	Extended content: 1998 FIBA Europe Under-18 Championship (youth); 1999 FIBA Under-19 World Championship (youth); 2000 FIBA Europe Under-20 Championship (youth); 2001 EuroBasket; 2003 EuroBasket; 2006 FIBA World Championship; 2007 EuroBasket; 2008 Summer Olympics; 2009 EuroBasket; 2011 EuroBasket; 2012 Summer Olympics; 2015 EuroBasket; 2016 Summer Olympics
Silvia Domínguez	12	Extended content: 2004 FIBA Europe Under-18 Championship for Women (youth); 2005 FIBA Europe Under-18 Championship for Women (youth); 2007 FIBA Europe Under-20 Championship for Women (youth); 2009 Eurobasket; 2013 Eurobasket; 2014 World Championship; 2015 Eurobasket; 2016 Summer Olympics; 2017 Eurobasket; 2018 World Cup; 2019 Eurobasket; 2023 Eurobasket
Rudy Fernández	12	Extended content: 2001 FIBA Europe Under-18 Championship (youth); 2006 FIBA World Championship; 2007 EuroBasket; 2008 Summer Olympics; 2009 EuroBasket; 2011 EuroBasket; 2012 Summer Olympics; 2013 EuroBasket; 2015 EuroBasket; 2016 Summer Olympics; 2019 World Cup; 2022 EuroBasket
Juan Carlos Navarro	12	Extended content: 1998 FIBA Europe Under-18 Championship (youth); 1999 FIBA Under-19 World Championship (youth); 2001 EuroBasket; 2003 EuroBasket; 2006 FIBA World Championship; 2007 EuroBasket; 2008 Summer Olympics; 2009 EuroBasket; 2011 EuroBasket; 2012 Summer Olympics; 2016 Summer Olympics; 2017 EuroBasket
Marta Xargay	12	Extended content: 2006 FIBA Europe Under-16 Championship (youth); 2007 FIBA Europe Under-18 Championship (youth); 2009 FIBA Europe Under-20 Championship (youth); 2009 FIBA Under-19 World Championship (youth); 2010 FIBA Europe Under-20 Championship (youth); 2013 Eurobasket; 2014 World Championship; 2015 Eurobasket; 2016 Summer Olympics; 2017 Eurobasket; 2018 World Cup; 2019 Eurobasket
Leticia Romero	11	Extended content: 2011 FIBA Europe Under-16 Championship (youth); 2012 FIBA Under-17 World Championship (youth); 2012 FIBA 3x3 Under-18 World Championships (youth, mixed); 2012 FIBA 3x3 Under-18 World Championships (youth); 2013 FIBA Europe Under-18 Championship (youth); 2014 FIBA Europe Under-20 Championship (youth); 2015 FIBA Europe Under-20 Championship (youth); 2014 World Championship; 2015 Eurobasket; 2016 Summer Olympics; 2017 Eurobasket
José Calderón	10	Extended content: 1998 FIBA Europe Under-18 Championship (youth); 2000 FIBA Europe Under-20 Championship (youth); 2003 EuroBasket; 2006 FIBA World Championship; 2007 EuroBasket; 2008 Summer Olympics; 2011 EuroBasket; 2012 Summer Olympics; 2013 EuroBasket; 2016 Summer Olympics
Queralt Casas	10	Extended content: 2008 FIBA Europe Under-16 Championship (youth); 2009 FIBA Europe Under-18 Championship (youth); 2010 FIBA Europe Under-18 Championship (youth); 2011 FIBA Europe Under-20 Championship (youth); 2011 FIBA Under-19 World Championship (youth); 2012 FIBA Europe Under-20 Championship (youth); 2013 Eurobasket; 2018 World Cup; 2019 Eurobasket; 2023 Eurobasket
Marc Gasol	10	Extended content: 2001 FIBA Europe Under-16 Championship (youth); 2006 FIBA World Championship; 2007 EuroBasket; 2008 Summer Olympics; 2009 EuroBasket; 2011 EuroBasket; 2012 Summer Olympics; 2013 EuroBasket; 2017 EuroBasket; 2019 World Cup
Lucila Pascua	10	Extended content: 1999 FIBA Europe Under-16 Championship for Women (youth); 2001 Mediterranean Games; 2003 Eurobasket; 2005 Eurobasket; 2007 Eurobasket; 2009 Eurobasket; 2010 World Championship; 2014 World Championship; 2015 Eurobasket; 2016 Summer Olympics
Laura Quevedo	10	Extended content: 2012 FIBA Europe Under-16 Championship (youth); 2012 FIBA Under-17 World Championship (youth); 2013 FIBA Europe Under-18 Championship (youth); 2013 FIBA 3x3 Under-18 World Championships (youth); 2014 FIBA Europe Under-20 Championship (youth); 2014 FIBA Europe Under-18 Championship (youth); 2015 FIBA Europe Under-20 Championship (youth); 2016 FIBA Europe Under-20 Championship (youth); 2016 Summer Olympics; 2023 Eurobasket
Leonor Rodríguez	10	Extended content: 2006 FIBA Europe Under-16 Championship (youth); 2007 FIBA Europe Under-16 Championship (youth); 2009 FIBA Europe Under-18 Championship (youth); 2009 FIBA Under-19 World Championship (youth); 2010 FIBA Europe Under-20 Championship (youth); 2011 FIBA Europe Under-20 Championship (youth); 2014 World Championship; 2016 Summer Olympics; 2017 Eurobasket; 2023 Eurobasket
**Maite Cazorla**	9	Extended content: 2012 FIBA Europe Under-16 Championship (youth); 2013 FIBA Europe Under-16 Championship (youth); 2014 FIBA Under-17 World Championship (youth); 2014 FIBA Europe Under-18 Championship (youth); 2015 FIBA Europe Under-18 Championship (youth); 2016 FIBA Europe Under-20 Championship (youth); 2017 FIBA Europe Under-20 Championship (youth); 2023 Eurobasket; 2026 World Cup
Víctor Claver	9	Extended content: 2006 FIBA Europe Under-18 Championship (youth); 2008 FIBA Europe Under-20 Championship (youth); 2009 EuroBasket; 2011 EuroBasket; 2012 Summer Olympics; 2013 EuroBasket; 2015 EuroBasket; 2016 Summer Olympics; 2019 World Cup
Anna Cruz	9	Extended content: 2007 FIBA Europe Under-18 Championship (youth); 2009 Eurobasket; 2010 World Championship; 2014 World Championship; 2015 Eurobasket; 2016 Summer Olympics; 2017 Eurobasket; 2018 World Cup; 2019 Eurobasket
Sergio Llull	9	Extended content: 2004 FIBA Europe Under-18 Championship (youth); 2007 FIBA Europe Under-20 Championship (youth); 2009 EuroBasket; 2011 EuroBasket; 2012 Summer Olympics; 2013 EuroBasket; 2015 EuroBasket; 2016 Summer Olympics; 2019 World Cup
Ricky Rubio	9	Extended content: 2005 FIBA Europe Under-16 Championship (youth); 2006 FIBA Europe Under-16 Championship (youth); 2008 Summer Olympics; 2009 EuroBasket; 2011 EuroBasket; 2013 EuroBasket; 2016 Summer Olympics; 2017 EuroBasket; 2019 World Cup
Elisa Aguilar	8	Extended content: 1993 FIBA Europe Under-16 Championship for Women (youth); 1994 FIBA Europe Under-18 Championship for Women (youth); 2001 Eurobasket; 2005 Eurobasket; 2007 Eurobasket; 2009 Eurobasket; 2010 World Championship; 2013 Eurobasket
Yurena Díaz	8	Extended content: 2008 FIBA Europe Under-16 Championship (youth); 2009 FIBA Europe Under-16 Championship (youth); 2010 FIBA Europe Under-18 Championship (youth); 2011 FIBA Under-19 World Championship (youth); 2011 FIBA Europe Under-18 Championship (youth); 2011 FIBA 3x3 Under-18 World Championships (youth); 2012 FIBA Europe Under-20 Championship (youth); 2013 FIBA Europe Under-20 Championship (youth)
Carlos Jiménez	8	Extended content: 1994 FIBA Europe Under-18 Championship (youth); 1995 FIBA Under-19 World Championship (youth); 1999 EuroBasket; 2001 EuroBasket; 2003 EuroBasket; 2006 FIBA World Championship; 2007 EuroBasket; 2008 Summer Olympics
**Astou Ndour**	8	Extended content: 2011 FIBA Europe Under-18 Championship (youth); 2011 FIBA Under-19 World Championship (youth); 2013 FIBA Europe Under-20 Championship (youth); 2015 Eurobasket; 2016 Summer Olympics; 2018 World Cup; 2019 Eurobasket
Cristina Ouviña	8	Extended content: 2006 FIBA Europe Under-16 Championship (youth); 2009 FIBA Europe Under-20 Championship (youth); 2009 FIBA Under-19 World Championship (youth); 2010 FIBA Europe Under-20 Championship (youth); 2013 Eurobasket; 2018 World Championship; 2019 Eurobasket; 2023 Eurobasket
Amaya Valdemoro	8	Extended content: 1993 FIBA Europe Under-16 Championship for Women (youth); 1994 FIBA Europe Under-18 Championship for Women (youth); 2003 Eurobasket; 2005 Eurobasket; 2007 Eurobasket; 2009 Eurobasket; 2010 World Championship; 2013 Eurobasket

== See also ==
- Spain national basketball team
- Spain women's national basketball team
- Spain national youth basketball teams
- Spanish basketball league system
- List of basketball clubs in Spain
