= 2005 FIBA Europe Under-18 Championship for Women Division B =

Tournament details
- Host country: Bosnia and Herzegovina
- City: Bihać, Cazin
- Dates: 5–14 August 2005
- Teams: 15 (from 1 confederation)
- Venue(s): 2 (in 2 host cities)

Final positions
- Champions: Belarus (1st title)
- Runners-up: Sweden
- Third place: Latvia

The 2005 FIBA U18 Women's European Championship Division B was the first edition of the Division B of the FIBA U18 Women's European Championship, the second tier of the European women's under-18 basketball championship. It was played in Bihać and Cazin, Bosnia and Herzegovina, from 5 to 14 August 2005. Belarus women's national under-18 basketball team won the tournament.

== Participating teams ==
- Belarus
- Bosnia and Herzegovina
- England
- Estonia
- Finland
- Iceland
- Ireland
- Israel
- Latvia
- Luxembourg
- Netherlands
- Portugal
- Romania
- Sweden
- Ukraine

== First round ==
In the first round, the teams were drawn into four groups. The first two teams from each group advance to the Quarterfinal round (Groups E and F); the other teams will play in the Classification round (Groups G and H).

=== Group A ===
Pos	Team	Pld	W	L	PF	PA	PD	Pts	Qualification
1	Estonia	3	3	0	191	153	+38	6	Quarterfinal round
2	Latvia	3	2	1	176	138	+38	5	Quarterfinal round
3	Bosnia and Herzegovina	3	1	2	169	186	−17	4	Classification round
4	Ireland	3	0	3	150	209	−59	3	Classification round

Source: FIBA Archive

5 August 2005

Boxscore

Estonia	75–55	Ireland

5 August 2005

Boxscore

Bosnia and Herzegovina	52–61	Latvia

6 August 2005

Boxscore

Latvia	51–52	Estonia

6 August 2005

Boxscore

Ireland	61–70	Bosnia and Herzegovina

7 August 2005

Boxscore

Estonia	64–47	Bosnia and Herzegovina

7 August 2005

Boxscore

Latvia	64–34	Ireland

=== Group B ===
Pos	Team	Pld	W	L	PF	PA	PD	Pts	Qualification
1	Sweden	3	3	0	196	143	+53	6	Quarterfinal round
2	Finland	3	2	1	171	175	−4	5	Quarterfinal round
3	Israel	3	1	2	193	203	−10	4	Classification round
4	Romania	3	0	3	156	195	−39	3	Classification round

Source: FIBA Archive

5 August 2005

Boxscore

Finland	56–49	Romania

5 August 2005

Boxscore

Sweden	66–58	Israel

6 August 2005

Boxscore

Israel	59–70	Finland

6 August 2005

Boxscore

Romania	40–63	Sweden

7 August 2005

Boxscore

Finland	45–67	Sweden

7 August 2005

Boxscore

Israel	76–67	Romania

=== Group C ===
Pos	Team	Pld	W	L	PF	PA	PD	Pts	Qualification
1	Belarus	3	3	0	223	145	+78	6	Quarterfinal round
2	Iceland	3	2	1	201	194	+7	5	Quarterfinal round
3	Ukraine	3	1	2	199	191	+8	4	Classification round
4	Luxembourg	3	0	3	139	232	−93	3	Classification round

Source: FIBA Archive

5 August 2005

Boxscore

Belarus	74–59	Iceland

5 August 2005

Boxscore

Luxembourg	45–87	Ukraine

6 August 2005

Boxscore

Ukraine	39–72	Belarus

6 August 2005

Boxscore

Iceland	68–47	Luxembourg

7 August 2005

Boxscore

Belarus	77–47	Luxembourg

7 August 2005

Boxscore

Ukraine	73–74	Iceland

=== Group D ===
Pos	Team	Pld	W	L	PF	PA	PD	Pts	Qualification
1	Portugal	2	2	0	140	99	+41	4	Quarterfinal round
2	England	2	1	1	121	124	−3	3	Quarterfinal round
3	Netherlands	2	0	2	94	132	−38	2	Classification round

Source: FIBA Archive

5 August 2005

Boxscore

England	54–75	Portugal

6 August 2005

Boxscore

Portugal	65–45	Netherlands

7 August 2005

Boxscore

Netherlands	49–67	England

== Quarterfinal round ==
In the Quarterfinal round, the teams play in two groups of four. The first two teams from each group advance to the Semifinals; the third and fourth teams will play in the 5th–8th place playoffs.

=== Group E ===
Pos	Team	Pld	W	L	PF	PA	PD	Pts	Qualification
1	Belarus	3	3	0	232	123	+109	6	Semifinals
2	Estonia	3	2	1	158	176	−18	5	Semifinals
3	England	3	1	2	164	192	−28	4	5th–8th place playoffs
4	Finland	3	0	3	151	214	−63	3	5th–8th place playoffs

Source: FIBA Archive

9 August 2005

Boxscore

Estonia	60–55	England

9 August 2005

Boxscore

Finland	41–89	Belarus

10 August 2005

Boxscore

Belarus	70–38	Estonia

10 August 2005

Boxscore

England	65–59	Finland

11 August 2005

Boxscore

Estonia	60–51	Finland

11 August 2005

Boxscore

Belarus	73–44	England

=== Group F ===
Pos	Team	Pld	W	L	PF	PA	PD	Pts	Qualification
1	Sweden	3	3	0	185	112	+73	6	Semifinals
2	Latvia	3	2	1	206	147	+59	5	Semifinals
3	Portugal	3	1	2	156	220	−64	4	5th–8th place playoffs
4	Iceland	3	0	3	168	236	−68	3	5th–8th place playoffs

Source: FIBA Archive

9 August 2005

Boxscore

Latvia	67–46	Portugal

9 August 2005

Boxscore

Sweden	60–39	Iceland

10 August 2005

Boxscore

Iceland	52–97	Latvia

10 August 2005

Boxscore

Portugal	31–76	Sweden

11 August 2005

Boxscore

Latvia	42–49	Sweden

11 August 2005

Boxscore

Iceland	77–79	Portugal

== Classification round ==
In the Classification round, the teams play in two groups. The first two teams from each group advance to the 9th–12th place playoffs.

=== Group G ===
Pos	Team	Pld	W	L	PF	PA	PD	Pts	Qualification
1	Bosnia and Herzegovina	2	2	0	133	110	+23	4	9th–12th place playoffs
2	Ukraine	2	1	1	138	111	+27	3	9th–12th place playoffs
3	Romania	2	0	2	98	148	−50	2	13th–15th place playoffs

Source: FIBA Archive

9 August 2005

Boxscore

Bosnia and Herzegovina	71–49	Romania

10 August 2005

Boxscore

Romania	49–77	Ukraine

11 August 2005

Boxscore

Ukraine	61–62	Bosnia and Herzegovina

=== Group H ===
Pos	Team	Pld	W	L	PF	PA	PD	Pts	Qualification
1	Israel	3	3	0	203	158	+45	6	9th–12th place playoffs
2	Ireland	3	2	1	174	144	+30	5	9th–12th place playoffs
3	Luxembourg	3	1	2	132	163	−31	4	13th–15th place playoffs
4	Netherlands	3	0	3	149	193	−44	3	13th–15th place playoffs

Source: FIBA Archive

9 August 2005

Boxscore

Israel	68–56	Netherlands

9 August 2005

Boxscore

Ireland	47–32	Luxembourg

10 August 2005

Boxscore

Luxembourg	36–66	Israel

10 August 2005

Boxscore

Netherlands	43–61	Ireland

11 August 2005

Boxscore

Israel	69–66	Ireland

11 August 2005

Boxscore

Luxembourg	64–50	Netherlands

== 13th–15th place playoffs ==
13th–15th place semifinal			13th place match
G3	Romania	70
H4	Netherlands	74	H4	Netherlands	54
			H3	Luxembourg	62

=== 13th–15th place semifinal ===
13 August 2005

Boxscore

Romania	70–74	Netherlands

=== 13th place match ===
14 August 2005

Boxscore

Netherlands	54–62	Luxembourg

== 9th–12th place playoffs ==
9th–12th place semifinals
G1	Bosnia and Herzegovina	74
H2	Ireland	48
H1	Israel	57
G2	Ukraine	55

9th place match
G1	Bosnia and Herzegovina	64
H1	Israel	59
11th place match
H2	Ireland	64
G2	Ukraine	82

=== 9th–12th place semifinals ===
13 August 2005

Boxscore

Bosnia and Herzegovina	74–48	Ireland

13 August 2005

Boxscore

Israel	57–55	Ukraine

=== 11th place match ===
14 August 2005

Boxscore

Ireland	64–82	Ukraine

=== 9th place match ===
14 August 2005

Boxscore

Bosnia and Herzegovina	64–59	Israel

== 5th–8th place playoffs ==
5th–8th place semifinals
E3	England	70
F4	Iceland	54
E4	Finland	71
F3	Portugal	50

5th place match
E3	England	50
E4	Finland	63
7th place match
F4	Iceland	78
F3	Portugal	80

=== 5th–8th place semifinals ===
13 August 2005

Boxscore

England	70–54	Iceland

13 August 2005

Boxscore

Finland	71–50	Portugal

=== 7th place match ===
14 August 2005

Boxscore

Iceland	78–80	Portugal

=== 5th place match ===
14 August 2005

Boxscore

England	50–63	Finland

== Championship playoffs ==
Semifinals
E1	Belarus	55
F2	Latvia	43
E2	Estonia	57
F1	Sweden	69

Finals
E1	Belarus	65
F1	Sweden	46
3rd place match
F2	Latvia	53
E2	Estonia	44

=== Semifinals ===
13 August 2005

Boxscore

Belarus	55–43	Latvia

13 August 2005

Boxscore

Estonia	57–69	Sweden

=== 3rd place match ===
14 August 2005

Boxscore

Latvia	53–44	Estonia

=== Final ===
14 August 2005

Boxscore

Belarus	65–46	Sweden

== Final standings ==
Promoted to the 2006 FIBA Europe Under-18 Championship for Women Division A

Rank	Team
1st place, gold medalist(s)	Belarus
2nd place, silver medalist(s)	Sweden
3rd place, bronze medalist(s)	Latvia
4	Estonia
5	Finland
6	England
7	Portugal
8	Iceland
9	Bosnia and Herzegovina
10	Israel
11	Ukraine
12	Ireland
13	Luxembourg
14	Netherlands
15	Romania
