= 2016 FIBA U18 Women's European Championship Division B =

Tournament details
- Host country: Bosnia and Herzegovina
- City: Sarajevo
- Dates: 23–31 July 2016
- Teams: 19 (from 1 confederation)
- Venues: 2 (in 1 host city)

Final positions
- Champions: Sweden (1st title)
- Runners-up: Greece
- Third place: Bosnia and Herzegovina

Official website
- www.fiba.basketball

The 2016 FIBA U18 Women's European Championship Division B was the 12th edition of the Division B of the European basketball championship for women's national under-18 teams. It was played from 23 to 31 July 2016 in Sarajevo, Bosnia and Herzegovina. Sweden women's national under-18 basketball team won the tournament.

== Participating teams ==
- Albania
- Belarus
- Bosnia and Herzegovina
- Bulgaria
- Denmark
- England
- Estonia ▼ (16th place, 2015 FIBA Europe Under-18 Championship for Women Division A)
- Finland
- Germany
- Greece
- Iceland
- Ireland
- Macedonia
- Poland ▼ (14th place, 2015 FIBA Europe Under-18 Championship for Women Division A)
- Portugal ▼ (15th place, 2015 FIBA Europe Under-18 Championship for Women Division A)
- Romania
- Scotland ▲ (Winners, 2015 FIBA Europe Under-18 Championship for Women Division C)
- Sweden
- Ukraine

== First round ==
In the first round, the teams were drawn into four groups. The first two teams from each group advance to the quarterfinals; the third and fourth teams advance to the 9th–16th place playoffs; the fifth teams will play in the 17th–19th place classification group.

=== Group A ===
Pos	Team	Pld	W	L	PF	PA	PD	Pts	Qualification
1	Bosnia and Herzegovina	4	4	0	309	264	+45	8	Quarterfinals
2	Iceland	4	3	1	276	264	+12	7	Quarterfinals
3	Finland	4	2	2	279	266	+13	6	9th–16th place playoffs
4	Portugal	4	1	3	228	244	−16	5	9th–16th place playoffs
5	Romania	4	0	4	240	294	−54	4	17th–19th place classification

Source: FIBA

23 July 2016

Boxscore

Portugal	52–61	Iceland

KSC Ilidža

23 July 2016

Boxscore

Finland	75–64	Romania

KSC IRC Hadžići

24 July 2016

Boxscore

Romania	53–69	Portugal

KSC Ilidža

24 July 2016

Boxscore

Bosnia and Herzegovina	68–66	Finland

KSC Ilidža

25 July 2016

Boxscore

Iceland	62–51	Romania

KSC IRC Hadžići

25 July 2016

Boxscore

Portugal	54–65	Bosnia and Herzegovina

KSC Ilidža

26 July 2016

Boxscore

Finland	65–53	Portugal

KSC IRC Hadžići

26 July 2016

Boxscore

Bosnia and Herzegovina	88–72	Iceland

KSC Ilidža

27 July 2016

Boxscore

Iceland	81–73	Finland

KSC IRC Hadžići

27 July 2016

Boxscore

Romania	72–88	Bosnia and Herzegovina

KSC Ilidža

=== Group B ===
Pos	Team	Pld	W	L	PF	PA	PD	Pts	Qualification
1	Belarus	4	4	0	331	217	+114	8	Quarterfinals
2	Poland	4	3	1	304	189	+115	7	Quarterfinals
3	Ukraine	4	2	2	269	202	+67	6	9th–16th place playoffs
4	Denmark	4	1	3	239	255	−16	5	9th–16th place playoffs
5	Albania	4	0	4	130	410	−280	4	17th–19th place classification

Source: FIBA

23 July 2016

Boxscore

Denmark	95–31	Albania

KSC IRC Hadžići

23 July 2016

Boxscore

Poland	52–40	Ukraine

KSC IRC Hadžići

24 July 2016

Boxscore

Ukraine	60–35	Denmark

KSC Ilidža

24 July 2016

Boxscore

Belarus	72–60	Poland

KSC IRC Hadžići

25 July 2016

Boxscore

Denmark	63–92	Belarus

KSC Ilidža

25 July 2016

Boxscore

Albania	42–101	Ukraine

KSC IRC Hadžići

26 July 2016

Boxscore

Poland	72–46	Denmark

KSC IRC Hadžići

26 July 2016

Boxscore

Belarus	94–26	Albania

KSC Ilidža

27 July 2016

Boxscore

Ukraine	68–73	Belarus

KSC IRC Hadžići

27 July 2016

Boxscore

Albania	31–120	Poland

KSC Ilidža

=== Group C ===
Pos	Team	Pld	W	L	PF	PA	PD	Pts	Qualification
1	Greece	4	4	0	253	196	+57	8	Quarterfinals
2	Ireland	4	3	1	288	201	+87	7	Quarterfinals
3	Estonia	4	2	2	213	199	+14	6	9th–16th place playoffs
4	England	4	1	3	225	234	−9	5	9th–16th place playoffs
5	Macedonia	4	0	4	155	304	−149	4	17th–19th place classification

Source: FIBA

23 July 2016

Boxscore

England	53–64	Ireland

KSC IRC Hadžići

23 July 2016

Boxscore

Greece	62–41	Macedonia

KSC Ilidža

24 July 2016

Boxscore

Estonia	54–47	England

KSC IRC Hadžići

24 July 2016

Boxscore

Ireland	59–63	Greece

KSC IRC Hadžići

25 July 2016

Boxscore

Greece	53–38	Estonia

KSC Ilidža

25 July 2016

Boxscore

Macedonia	39–100	Ireland

KSC IRC Hadžići

26 July 2016

Boxscore

Estonia	75–34	Macedonia

KSC Ilidža

26 July 2016

Boxscore

England	58–75	Greece

KSC IRC Hadžići

27 July 2016

Boxscore

Ireland	65–46	Estonia

KSC Ilidža

27 July 2016

Boxscore

Macedonia	41–67	England

KSC Ilidža

=== Group D ===
Pos	Team	Pld	W	L	PF	PA	PD	Pts	Qualification
1	Sweden	3	3	0	225	106	+119	6	Quarterfinals
2	Germany	3	2	1	203	151	+52	5	Quarterfinals
3	Bulgaria	3	1	2	185	193	−8	4	9th–16th place playoffs
4	Scotland	3	0	3	103	266	−163	3	9th–16th place playoffs

Source: FIBA

23 July 2016

Boxscore

Sweden	71–41	Bulgaria

KSC Ilidža

23 July 2016

Boxscore

Scotland	33–86	Germany

KSC Ilidža

25 July 2016

Boxscore

Germany	38–64	Sweden

KSC IRC Hadžići

25 July 2016

Boxscore

Bulgaria	90–43	Scotland

KSC Ilidža

27 July 2016

Boxscore

Scotland	27–90	Sweden

KSC IRC Hadžići

27 July 2016

Boxscore

Bulgaria	54–79	Germany

KSC IRC Hadžići

== 17th–19th place classification ==
=== Group E ===
Pos	Team	Pld	W	L	PF	PA	PD	Pts
17	Romania	2	2	0	193	76	+117	4
18	Macedonia	2	1	1	119	133	−14	3
19	Albania	2	0	2	80	183	−103	2

Source: FIBA

29 July 2016

Boxscore

Romania	104–36	Albania

KSC Ilidža

30 July 2016

Boxscore

Albania	44–79	Macedonia

KSC Ilidža

31 July 2016

Boxscore

Macedonia	40–89	Romania

KSC Ilidža

== 9th–16th place playoffs ==
13th place match
B4	Denmark	56
B3	Ukraine	70
15th place match
D3	Bulgaria	89
D4	Scotland	67

13th–16th place semifinals
B4	Denmark	59
D3	Bulgaria	43
B3	Ukraine	83
D4	Scotland	41

9th–16th place quarterfinals
A3	Finland	79
B4	Denmark	41
D3	Bulgaria	56
C4	England	75
B3	Ukraine	59
A4	Portugal	64
C3	Estonia	68
D4	Scotland	42

9th–12th place semifinals
A3	Finland	59
C4	England	50
A4	Portugal	60
C3	Estonia	41

9th place match
A3	Finland	85
A4	Portugal	88
11th place match
C4	England	48
C3	Estonia	43

=== 9th–16th place quarterfinals ===
29 July 2016

Boxscore

Finland	79–41	Denmark

KSC IRC Hadžići

29 July 2016

Boxscore

Bulgaria	56–75	England

KSC IRC Hadžići

29 July 2016

Boxscore

Ukraine	59–64	Portugal

KSC IRC Hadžići

29 July 2016

Boxscore

Estonia	68–42	Scotland

KSC IRC Hadžići

=== 13th–16th place semifinals ===
30 July 2016

Boxscore

Denmark	59–43	Bulgaria

KSC IRC Hadžići

30 July 2016

Boxscore

Ukraine	83–41	Scotland

KSC IRC Hadžići

=== 9th–12th place semifinals ===
30 July 2016

Boxscore

Finland	59–50	England

KSC IRC Hadžići

30 July 2016

Boxscore

Portugal	60–41	Estonia

KSC IRC Hadžići

=== 15th place match ===
31 July 2016

Boxscore

Bulgaria	89–67	Scotland

KSC IRC Hadžići

=== 13th place match ===
31 July 2016

Boxscore

Denmark	56–70	Ukraine

KSC IRC Hadžići

=== 11th place match ===
31 July 2016

Boxscore

England	48–43	Estonia

KSC IRC Hadžići

=== 9th place match ===
31 July 2016

Boxscore

Finland	85–88	Portugal

KSC IRC Hadžići

== Championship playoffs ==
5th place match
B2	Poland	67
B1	Belarus	82
7th place match
C2	Ireland	61
D2	Germany	63

5th–8th place semifinals
B2	Poland	75
C2	Ireland	71
B1	Belarus	75
D2	Germany	63

Quarterfinals
A1	Bosnia and Herzegovina	81
B2	Poland	59
D1	Sweden	72
C2	Ireland	54
B1	Belarus	68
A2	Iceland	85
C1	Greece	54
D2	Germany	48

Semifinals
A1	Bosnia and Herzegovina	68
D1	Sweden	81
A2	Iceland	61
C1	Greece	65

Final
D1	Sweden	62
C1	Greece	47
3rd place match
A1	Bosnia and Herzegovina	82
A2	Iceland	67

=== Quarterfinals ===
29 July 2016

Boxscore

Greece	54–48	Germany

KSC Ilidža

29 July 2016

Boxscore

Belarus	68–85	Iceland

KSC Ilidža

29 July 2016

Boxscore

Bosnia and Herzegovina	81–59	Poland

KSC Ilidža

29 July 2016

Boxscore

Sweden	72–54	Ireland

KSC Ilidža

=== 5th–8th place semifinals ===
30 July 2016

Boxscore

Belarus	75–63	Germany

KSC Ilidža

30 July 2016

Boxscore

Poland	75–71	Ireland

KSC Ilidža

=== Semifinals ===
30 July 2016

Boxscore

Bosnia and Herzegovina	68–81	Sweden

KSC Ilidža

30 July 2016

Boxscore

Iceland	61–65	Greece

KSC Ilidža

=== 7th place match ===
31 July 2016

Boxscore

Ireland	61–63	Germany

KSC Ilidža

=== 5th place match ===
31 July 2016

Boxscore

Poland	67–82	Belarus

KSC Ilidža

=== 3rd place match ===
31 July 2016

Boxscore

Bosnia and Herzegovina	82–67	Iceland

KSC Ilidža

=== Final ===
31 July 2016

Boxscore

Sweden	62–47	Greece

KSC Ilidža

== Final standings ==
Rank	Team
1st place, gold medalist(s)	Sweden
2nd place, silver medalist(s)	Greece
3rd place, bronze medalist(s)	Bosnia and Herzegovina
4	Iceland
5	Belarus
6	Poland
7	Germany
8	Ireland
9	Portugal
10	Finland
11	England
12	Estonia
13	Ukraine
14	Denmark
15	Bulgaria
16	Scotland
17	Romania
18	Macedonia
19	Albania

Promoted to the 2017 FIBA U18 Women's European Championship Division A
