= 2010 FIBA Europe Under-18 Championship for Women =

2010 FIBA U18 Women's European Championship
27th FIBA Under-18 Women's European Basketball Championship

Tournament details
- Host country: Slovakia
- Dates: 29 July – 8 August 2010
- Teams: 16 (from 1 confederation)
- Venues: 2 (in 2 host cities)

Final positions
- Champions: Italy (2nd title)

Tournament statistics
- MVP: (Slovenia) Nika Barič
- Top scorer: (Ukraine) Alina Iagupova (32.6)
- Top rebounds: (Turkey) Özge Kavurmacıoğlu (11.3)
- Top assists: (Slovenia) Nika Baric (5.9)
- PPG (Team): Czech Republic (72.6)
- RPG (Team): Ukraine (50.8)
- APG (Team): Czech Republic (17.3)

Official website
- www.fibaeurope.com

The 2010 FIBA Europe Under-18 Championship for Women was the 27th edition of the FIBA Europe Under-18 Championship for Women. 16 teams featured the competition, held in Slovakia from 25 July to 8 August 2010. Spain was the current title holder. Italy won this year's edition.

== Teams ==
- Belgium
- Czech Republic
- France
- Hungary
- Italy
- Latvia
- Lithuania
- Poland
- Russia
- Serbia
- Slovakia
- Slovenia
- Spain
- Sweden
- Turkey
- Ukraine

== Group stages ==
=== Preliminary round ===
In this round, the sixteen teams were allocated in four groups of four teams each. The top three qualified for the qualifying round. The last team of each group played for the 13th–16th place in the Classification Games.

Team advanced to Qualifying Round
Team competed in Classification Round

Times given below are in CEST (UTC+2).

==== Group A ====
Team	Pld	W	L	PF	PA	PD	Pts	Tiebreaker
Spain	3	3	0	208	140	+68	6	
Slovakia	3	2	1	178	166	+12	5	
Serbia	3	1	2	162	194	−32	4	
Hungary	3	0	3	145	193	−48	3	

29 July
18:15

Report

Spain	63–53	Slovakia
Scoring by quarter: 11–8, 19–17, 10–8, 23–20
Pts: Laura Gil (15); Rebs: Laura Gil (10); Asts: Mariona Ortiz (3)		Pts: Martina Kissová, Zofia Hruscáková (8); Rebs: Marta Páleníková (6); Asts: Marta Páleníková (4)

Aréna Poprad, Poprad
Attendance: 1,500
Referees: Oscar Lefwerth, Fabiana Nitu, Tomasz Kudlicki

29 July
20:30

Report

Serbia	63–54 (OT)	Hungary
Scoring by quarter: 11–10, 10–11, 13–9, 12–16, Overtime: 17–8
Pts: Dijana Stancic (20); Rebs: Ivana Brajkovic (18); Asts: Zorana Nikolic (5)		Pts: Lilla Adamecz (18); Rebs: Flóra Szabó (8); Asts: Lilla Adamecz (3)

Aréna Poprad, Poprad
Attendance: 200
Referees: Marco Giansanti, Ilona Kučerová, Igor Poljansek

30 July
18:00

Report

Slovakia	67–52	Serbia
Scoring by quarter: 16–19, 17–13, 8–9, 26–11
Pts: Martina Kissová (22); Rebs: Martina Kissová (7); Asts: Martina Kissová, Petra Bartánusová (4)		Pts: Dijana Stancic (13); Rebs: Ivana Brajkovic (7); Asts: Kaja Stankovic (3)

Sport Hall, Spišská Nová Ves
Attendance: 500
Referees: Oskars Lucis, Carole Delauné, Shefqet Bekteshi

30 July
20:15

Report

Hungary	40–72	Spain
Scoring by quarter: 10–16, 13–14, 11–20, 6–22
Pts: Flóra Szabó (10); Rebs: Alma Németh, Anna Mansaré (5); Asts: Lilla Adamecz, Bettina Baksa (2)		Pts: Elena Diaz (14); Rebs: Marta Claret (8); Asts: Marta Claret (6)

Sport Hall, Spišská Nová Ves
Attendance: 50
Referees: Panagiotis Anastopoulos, Emin Mogulkoc, Borys Shulga

31 July
15:45

Report

Serbia	47–73	Spain
Scoring by quarter: 15–19, 11–18, 9–15, 12–21
Pts: Jovana Karakasevic, Dijana Stancic (11); Rebs: Jelena Repic (6); Asts: three players (2)		Pts: Yurena Diaz (15); Rebs: Andrea Vilaró (7); Asts: Andrea Vilaró (4)

Aréna Poprad, Poprad
Attendance: 150
Referees: Dragan Kralj, Marco Giansanti, Mindaugas Vecerskis

31 July
18:00

Report

Slovakia	58–51	Hungary
Scoring by quarter: 11–15, 12–13, 18–2, 17–21
Pts: Denisa Domiterová, Marta Páleníková (12); Rebs: Denisa Domiterová (8); Asts: three players (4)		Pts: Lilla Adamecz (11); Rebs: Alma Németh, Szidónia Katona (5); Asts: Bettina Baksa (2)

Aréna Poprad, Poprad
Attendance: 2,000
Referees: Tomasz Kudlicki, Emin Mogulkoc, Ilona Kučerová

==== Group B ====
Team	Pld	W	L	PF	PA	PD	Pts	Tiebreaker
Russia	3	2	1	195	175	+25	5	
Slovenia	3	2	1	218	203	+15	5	
Sweden	3	2	1	173	184	−11	5	
Belgium	3	0	3	179	203	−24	3	

29 July
12:45

Report

Russia	66–58	Belgium
Scoring by quarter: 12–18, 15–11, 18–9, 21–20
Pts: Yulia Stepanova (15); Rebs: Svetlana Efimova (8); Asts: Anastasiya Maksimova (6)		Pts: Hanne Mestdagh (13); Rebs: Hanne Mestdagh (7); Asts: Lut De Meyer (3)

Aréna Poprad, Poprad
Attendance: 100
Referees: Miguel Anguel Perez Niz, Shefqet Bekteshi, Uros Obrknezevic

29 July
15:00

Report

Sweden	70–67	Slovenia
Scoring by quarter: 15–10, 18–22, 12–22, 24–13
Pts: Amanda Zahui (27); Rebs: Amanda Zahui (10); Asts: Salome Kabengano (5)		Pts: Rebeka Abramovic (19); Rebs: Tjasa Gortnar (8); Asts: Nika Baric (5)

Aréna Poprad, Poprad
Attendance: 250
Referees: Panagiotis Anastopoulos, Oskars Lucis, Carole Delauné

30 July
13:30

Report

Slovenia	70–57	Russia
Scoring by quarter: 15–8, 21–23, 19–17, 15–9
Pts: Nika Baric (24); Rebs: Nika Baric (10); Asts: Nika Baric (3)		Pts: Svetlana Efimova (16); Rebs: Yulia Stepanova, Anastasiya Maksimova (6); Asts: Ekaterina Fedorenkova (4)

Sport Hall, Spišská Nová Ves
Attendance: 100
Referees: Ilona Kučerová, Marco Giansanti, Tomasz Kudlicki

30 July
15:45

Report

Belgium	45–56	Sweden
Scoring by quarter: 12–21, 9–17, 10–9, 14–9
Pts: Silke Storme (9); Rebs: Lut De Meyer, Ann Schyvens (5); Asts: Ann Schyvens (2)		Pts: Amanda Zahui (19); Rebs: Amanda Zahui (15); Asts: Salome Kabengano (5)

Sport Hall, Spišská Nová Ves
Referees: Tomislav Vovk, Mindaugas Vecerskis, Fabiana Nitu

31 July
13:30

Report

Slovenia	81–76	Belgium
Scoring by quarter: 16–17, 24–15, 27–18, 14–26
Pts: Nika Baric (24); Rebs: Tjasa Gortnar (12); Asts: Nika Baric, Eva Rupnik (4)		Pts: Emmanuella Mayombo, Hanne Mestdagh (16); Rebs: Hanne Mestdagh (12); Asts: Lut De Meyer (4)

Aréna Poprad, Poprad
Attendance: 100
Referees: Carole Delauné, Igor Dragojevic, Ervin Koci

31 July
20:15

Report

Russia	72–47	Sweden
Scoring by quarter: 12–17, 19–10, 23–7, 18–13
Pts: Yulia Poluyanova (18); Rebs: Yulia Poluyanova (11); Asts: Alexandra Stolyar (5)		Pts: Amanda Zahui (13); Rebs: Salome Kabengano, Sandra Hasahya (6); Asts: Mia Hakim (3)

Aréna Poprad, Poprad
Attendance: 200
Referees: Borys Shulga, Oskars Lucis, Neil Wilkinson

==== Group C ====
Team	Pld	W	L	PF	PA	PD	Pts	Tiebreaker
Italy	3	3	0	207	157	+50	6	
Lithuania	3	2	1	195	178	+17	5	
Poland	3	1	2	164	184	−20	4	
Latvia	3	0	3	156	203	−47	3	

29 July
15:00

Report

Lithuania	62–55	Poland
Scoring by quarter: 11–8, 19–17, 10–8, 23–20
Pts: Santa Okockyte (25); Rebs: Paulina Zaveckaite (13); Asts: Santa Okockyte (3)		Pts: Magdalena Zietara (18); Rebs: three players (5); Asts: Magdalena Zietara, Katarzyna Trzeciak (2)

Sport Hall, Spišská Nová Ves
Attendance: 1500
Referees: Oscar Lefwerth, Fabiana Nitu, Tomasz Kudlicki

29 July
18:15

Report

Italy	65–53	Latvia
Scoring by quarter: 24–14, 12–13, 16–13, 13–13
Pts: Lucia Morsiani (13); Rebs: Debora Carangelo (7); Asts: Beatrice Carta, Gaia Gorini (5)		Pts: Linda Pagrode (16); Rebs: Linda Pagrode (10); Asts: Anete Kirsteine (2)

Sport Hall, Spišská Nová Ves
Attendance: 100
Referees: Emin Mogulkoc, Borys Shulga, Dragan Kralj

30 July
13:30

Report

Latvia	51–79	Lithuania
Scoring by quarter: 18–20, 16–21, 10–18, 7–20
Pts: Kristiana Stauere (10); Rebs: Sabine Dukate (5); Asts: three players (2)		Pts: Santa Okockyte (20); Rebs: Laura Svaryte (11); Asts: Neringa Skadaite (6)

Aréna Poprad, Poprad
Attendance: 100
Referees: Neil Wilkinson, Boris Gabara, Zdenko Zubak

30 July
15:45

Report

Poland	50–70	Italy
Scoring by quarter: 11–21, 9–24, 19–7, 11–18
Pts: Magdalena Zietara (16); Rebs: Agata Szczepanik (7); Asts: Paulina Kuras (6)		Pts: Lucia Morsiani (14); Rebs: Lucia Morsiani (8); Asts: Beatrice Carta (7)

Aréna Poprad, Poprad
Attendance: 100
Referees: Oscar Lefwerth, Igor Poljansek, Zoltan Palla

31 July
13:30

Report

Lithuania	54–72	Italy
Scoring by quarter: 13–19, 11–19, 8–17, 22–17
Pts: Kriste Druskyte (15); Rebs: Paulina Zaveckaite (10); Asts: Santa Okockyte, Kriste Druskyte (3)		Pts: Marta Masoni (13); Rebs: Francesca Dotto (6); Asts: Gaia Gorini (3)

Sport Hall, Spišská Nová Ves
Attendance: 50
Referees: Miguel Anguel Perez Niz, Fabiana Nitu, Uros Obrknezevic

31 July
15:45

Report

Latvia	52–59	Poland
Scoring by quarter: 14–22, 12–13, 12–11, 14–13
Pts: Kristiana Stauere, Anete Kirsteine (12)); Rebs: Guna Lagzdina (11); Asts: Linda Pagrode (3)		Pts: Paulina Kuras (15); Rebs: Kinga Bandyk (12); Asts: Magdalena Zietara (6)

Sport Hall, Spišská Nová Ves
Attendance: 50
Referees: Igor Poljansek, Panagiotis Anastopoulos, Elena Chernova

==== Group D ====
Team	Pld	W	L	PF	PA	PD	Pts	Tiebreaker
France	3	3	0	193	189	+4	6	
Ukraine	3	2	1	221	211	+10	5	
Turkey	3	1	2	215	109	+6	4	
Czech Republic	3	0	3	216	236	−20	3	

29 July
12:45

Report

Czech Republic	68–86	Turkey
Scoring by quarter: 18–19, 19–25, 10–26, 21–16
Pts: Martina Čepelková (21); Rebs: Michaela Horáková (5); Asts: seven players (7)		Pts: Ayşegül Günay (22); Rebs: Özge Kavurmacıoğlu (13); Asts: Ayşe Cora, Nihan Demirkol (5)

Sport Hall, Spišská Nová Ves
Attendance: 100
Referees: Mindaugas Vecerskis, Zoltan Palla, Zdenko Zubak

29 July
20:30

Report

France	62–61	Ukraine
Scoring by quarter: 26–16, 8–15, 15–18, 13–12
Pts: Florine Basque (17); Rebs: Lucie Barba (10); Asts: Lucie Barba (5)		Pts: Alina Iagupova (41); Rebs: Alina Iagupova (11); Asts: Alina Iagupova (4)

Sport Hall, Spišská Nová Ves
Attendance: 100
Referees: Tomislav Vovk, Neil Wilkinson, Boris Gabara

30 July
18:00

Report

Ukraine	76–75	Czech Republic
Scoring by quarter: 15–21, 21–18, 20–12, 20–24
Pts: Alina Iagupova (34); Rebs: Lyudmyla Naumenko (16); Asts: Alina Iagupova, Mariya Tkach (4)		Pts: Karolína Elhotová (20); Rebs: Tereza Vyoralová (10); Asts: Monika Kůsová (4)

Aréna Poprad, Poprad
Attendance: 150
Referees: Elena Chernova, Dragan Kralj, Uros Obrknezevic

30 July
20:15

Report

Turkey	55–57	France
Scoring by quarter: 11–14, 17–10, 14–9, 13–24
Pts: Nihan Demirkol (16); Rebs: Özge Kavurmacıoğlu (14); Asts: Özge Kavurmacıoğlu (3)		Pts: Mélanie Devaux (12); Rebs: Lucie Barba (12); Asts: Florine Basque, Maissa Radjati (3)

Aréna Poprad, Poprad
Attendance: 100
Referees: Miguel Anguel Perez Niz, Igor Dragojevic, Ervin Koci

31 July
18:00

Report

Czech Republic	73–74	France
Scoring by quarter: 18–16, 29–19, 11–12, 15–27
Pts: Martina Čepelková (17); Rebs: Monika Satoranská (14); Asts: Monika Kůsová (3)		Pts: Hélèna Akmouche (23); Rebs: Eléonore Grossemy (8); Asts: three players (2)

Sport Hall, Spišská Nová Ves
Attendance: 100
Referees: Zoltan Palla, Zdenko Zubak, Tomislav Vovk

31 July
20:15

Report

Ukraine	84–74	Turkey
Scoring by quarter: 12–18, 23–14, 25–28, 24–14
Pts: Alina Iagupova (40); Rebs: Lyudmyla Naumenko (13); Asts: Alina Iagupova, Oxana Rysina (3)		Pts: Nihan Demirkol (23); Rebs: Özge Kavurmacıoğlu (15); Asts: three players (3)

Sport Hall, Spišská Nová Ves
Attendance: 50
Referees: Boris Gabara, Oscar Lefwerth, Shefqet Bekteshi

=== Qualifying round ===
The twelve teams remaining were allocated in two groups of six teams each. The four top teams advanced to the quarterfinals. The last two teams of each group played for the 9th–12th place.

Team advanced to Quarterfinals
Team competed in 9th–12th playoffs

==== Group E ====
Team	Pld	W	L	PF	PA	PD	Pts	Tiebreaker
Spain	5	5	0	303	216	+87	10	
Russia	5	3	2	332	270	+62	8	1–1 +12
Slovenia	5	3	2	303	305	−2	8	1–1 +10
Sweden	5	3	2	275	288	−13	8	1–1 −32
Slovakia	5	1	4	301	320	−19	6	
Serbia	5	0	5	231	346	−115	5	

2 August
15:45

Report

Sweden	38–50	Spain
Scoring by quarter: 6–9, 8–17, 10–12, 14–12
Pts: Salome Kabengano (9); Rebs: Salome Kabengano, Amanda Zahui (8); Asts: four players (4)		Pts: Queralt Casas (12); Rebs: Queralt Casas (7); Asts: Mariona Ortiz, Queralt Casas (4)

Aréna Poprad, Poprad
Attendance: 70
Referees: Ilona Kučerová, Emin Mogulkoc, Ervin Koci

2 August
18:00

Report

Slovenia	78–73 (OT)	Slovakia
Scoring by quarter: 18–9, 14–15, 16–21, 18–21, Overtime: 12–7
Pts: Nika Baric (29); Rebs: Tina Jakovina (11); Asts: Nika Baric (12)		Pts: Martina Kissová (21); Rebs: Denisa Domiterová (10); Asts: Marta Páleníková (7)

Aréna Poprad, Poprad
Attendance: 500
Referees: Oskars Lucis, Borys Shulga, Mindaugas Vecerskis

2 August
20:15

Report

Serbia	48–88	Russia
Scoring by quarter: 7–16, 18–23, 10–24, 13–25
Pts: Ivana Brajkovic (15); Rebs: Ivana Brajkovic (9); Asts: Ivana Brajkovic (3)		Pts: Svetlana Efimova (19); Rebs: Yulia Poluyanova (7); Asts: Anastasiya Maksimova (5)

Aréna Poprad, Poprad
Attendance: 70
Referees: Panagiotis Anastopoulos, Igor Dragojevic, Carole Delauné

3 August
15:45

Report

Spain	61–31	Slovenia
Scoring by quarter: 20–2, 11–13, 15–8, 17–8
Pts: Laura Gil, Mariona Ortiz (8); Rebs: Laura Gil (12); Asts: Elisabet Vivas (3)		Pts: Bojana Adamovic (10); Rebs: Sandra Jevtovic (13); Asts: Sandra Jevtovic, Tjasa Unverdorben (2)

Sport Hall, Spišská Nová Ves
Attendance: 100
Referees: Igor Dragojevic, Panagiotis Anastopoulos, Fabiana Nitu

3 August
18:00

Report

Slovakia	51–68	Russia
Scoring by quarter: 15–15, 12–15, 9–21, 15–17
Pts: Noema Brádnanská (10); Rebs: Denisa Domiterová (7); Asts: Denisa Domiterová (4)		Pts: Yulia Poluyanova (22); Rebs: Anastasiya Maksimova (14); Asts: Anastasiya Maksimova (5)

Sport Hall, Spišská Nová Ves
Attendance: 100
Referees: Marco Giansanti, Zoltan Palla, Emin Mogulkoc

3 August
20:15

Report

Sweden	61–42	Serbia
Scoring by quarter: 17–7, 12–18, 18–5, 14–12
Pts: Amanda Zahui (19); Rebs: Nathalie Fontaine (8); Asts: Nathalie Fontaine (4)		Pts: Snezana Colic (16); Rebs: four players (5); Asts: Snezana Colic (2)

Sport Hall, Spišská Nová Ves
Attendance: 70
Referees: Dragan Kralj, Tomasz Kudlicki, Shefqet Bekteshi

4 August
15:45

Report

Slovenia	57–42	Serbia
Scoring by quarter: 17–6, 11–7, 17–17, 12–12
Pts: Nika Baric (18); Rebs: Sandra Jevtovic (7); Asts: Nika Baric (9)		Pts: Ivana Brajkovic (16); Rebs: Ivana Brajkovic (15); Asts: Snezana Colic (4)

Aréna Poprad, Poprad
Attendance: 100
Referees: Marco Giansanti, Ilona Kučerová, Ervin Koci

4 August
18:00

Report

Slovakia	57–59	Sweden
Scoring by quarter: 16–16, 10–21, 18–13, 13–9
Pts: Martina Kissová (18); Rebs: Sabína Oroszová (7); Asts: Adriána Firkalová, Sabína Oroszová (3)		Pts: Farhiya Abdi (20); Rebs: Amanda Zahui (13); Asts: Salome Kabengano (3)

Aréna Poprad, Poprad
Attendance: 500
Referees: Mindaugas Vecerskis, Carole Delauné, Dragan Kralj

4 August
20:15

Report

Russia	47–54	Spain
Scoring by quarter: 10–23, 15–11, 9–15, 13–5
Pts: Ekaterina Fedorenkova (13); Rebs: Nina Gumennaya (6); Asts: seven players (1)		Pts: Laura Gil (12); Rebs: Laura Gil (7); Asts: Queralt Casas (8)

Aréna Poprad, Poprad
Attendance: 50
Referees: Borys Shulga, Tomasz Kudlicki, Neil Wilkinson

==== Group F ====
Team	Pld	W	L	PF	PA	PD	Pts	Tiebreaker
Italy	5	5	0	348	265	+83	10	
Lithuania	5	3	2	345	337	+8	8	1–0
France	5	3	2	307	303	+4	8	0–1
Ukraine	5	2	3	329	333	−4	7	1–0
Turkey	5	2	3	333	382	−49	7	0–1
Poland	5	0	5	295	337	−42	5	

2 August
15:45

Report

Turkey	52–63	Italy
Scoring by quarter: 17–16, 13–12, 6–16, 16–19
Pts: Olcay Çakır (14); Rebs: Olcay Çakır (8); Asts: Olcay Çakır, Nihan Demirkol (3)		Pts: Francesca Dotto (15); Rebs: Gaia Gorini (6); Asts: Beatrice Carta, Gaia Gorini (5)

Sport Hall, Spišská Nová Ves
Attendance: 150
Referees: Zoltan Palla, Tomislav Vovk, Zdenko Zubak

2 August
18:00

Report

Ukraine	66–95	Lithuania
Scoring by quarter: 17–27, 14–17, 16–23, 19–28
Pts: Alina Iagupova (29); Rebs: Alina Iagupova, Oxana Rysina (6); Asts: Alina Iagupova (5)		Pts: Monika Grigalauskyte (19); Rebs: Paulina Zaveckaite (11); Asts: Santa Okockyte (9)

Sport Hall, Spišská Nová Ves
Attendance: 100
Referees: Miguel Anguel Perez Niz, Fabiana Nitu, Dragan Kralj

2 August
20:15

Report

Poland	56–66	France
Scoring by quarter: 15–15, 7–16, 18–15, 16–20
Pts: Magdalena Zietara (19); Rebs: Paulina Kuras (6); Asts: Katarzyna Trzeciak (3)		Pts: Hélèna Akmouche (19); Rebs: Margaux Galliou, Lucie Barba (7); Asts: Sabrine Bouzenna (6)

Sport Hall, Spišská Nová Ves
Attendance: 150
Referees: Boris Gabara, Oscar Lefwerth, Shefqet Bekteshi

3 August
15:45

Report

Italy	81–51	Ukraine
Scoring by quarter: 23–11, 23–14, 27–15, 8–11
Pts: Lucia Morsiani (17); Rebs: Clara Salvini (9); Asts: Beatrice Carta, Gaia Gorini (4)		Pts: Alina Iagupova (13); Rebs: Viktoriya Karyeva (9); Asts: Nataliya Pokrovenko (2)

Aréna Poprad, Poprad
Attendance: 50
Referees: Oskars Lucis, Neil Wilkinson, Ervin Koci

3 August
18:00

Report

Turkey	68–64	Poland
Scoring by quarter: 18–9, 19–18, 12–20, 19–17
Pts: Özge Kavurmacıoğlu (20); Rebs: Emel Güler (8); Asts: Nihan Demirkol (3)		Pts: Paulina Kuras (15); Rebs: Agata Szczepanik (11); Asts: Paulina Kuras (3)

Aréna Poprad, Poprad
Attendance: 50
Referees: Miguel Anguel Perez Niz, Ilona Kučerová, Uros Obrknezevic

3 August
20:15

Report

Lithuania	69–64	France
Scoring by quarter: 23–11, 8–17, 19–16, 19–20
Pts: Santa Okockyte (29); Rebs: Neringa Skadaite (8); Asts: Vitalija Kaminskyte (4)		Pts: Mélanie Devaux (12); Rebs: Lucie Barba (7); Asts: Maissa Radjati (6)

Aréna Poprad, Poprad
Attendance: 50
Referees: Elena Chernova, Igor Poljansek, Zdenko Zubak

4 August
15:45

Report

Ukraine	71–70	Poland
Scoring by quarter: 18–16, 19–18, 17–25, 17–11
Pts: Alina Iagupova (42); Rebs: Lyudmyla Naumenko (13); Asts: Mariya Tkach, Lyudmyla Naumenko (2)		Pts: Magdalena Zietara (16); Rebs: Kinga Bandyk, Magdalena Zietara (8); Asts: Aldona Morawiec, Magdalena Zietara (5)

Sport Hall, Spišská Nová Ves
Attendance: 100
Referees: Zoltan Palla, Igor Poljansek, Zdenko Zubak

4 August
18:00

Report

Lithuania	65–80	Turkey
Scoring by quarter: 14–24, 14–21, 22–19, 15–16
Pts: Santa Okockyte (18); Rebs: Laura Svaryte, Paulina Zaveckaite (8); Asts: three players (3)		Pts: Özge Kavurmacıoğlu (22); Rebs: Özge Kavurmacıoğlu (9); Asts: Özge Kavurmacıoğlu (8)

Sport Hall, Spišská Nová Ves
Attendance: 50
Referees: Oskars Lucis, Oscar Lefwerth, Milan Brziak

4 August
20:15

Report

France	58–62 (OT)	Italy
Scoring by quarter: 14–14, 12–16, 16–9, 12–15, Overtime: 4–8
Pts: Mélanie Devaux (12); Rebs: Lucie Barba (12); Asts: Eléonore Grossemy (4)		Pts: Gaia Gorini (13); Rebs: Gaia Gorini (6); Asts: three players (3)

Sport Hall, Spišská Nová Ves
Attendance: 100
Referees: Igor Dragojevic, Tomislav Vovk, Uros Obrknezevic

=== Classification round ===
The last teams of each group in the preliminary round will compete in this Classification Round. The four teams will play in one group. The last two teams will be relegated to Division B for the next season.

Team will be relegated to Division B.

==== Group G ====
Team	Pld	W	L	PF	PA	PD	Pts	Tiebreaker
Belgium	6	4	2	416	335	+81	10	
Czech Republic	6	4	2	437	368	+69	10	
Hungary	6	3	3	337	396	−59	9	
Latvia	6	1	5	347	438	−91	7	

2 August
13:30

Report

Belgium	59–63	Latvia
Scoring by quarter: 13–12, 18–18, 22–18, 6–15
Pts: Lut De Meyer (16); Rebs: Lut De Meyer (7); Asts: Ann Schyvens (3)		Pts: Anete Kirsteine (24); Rebs: Anete Kirsteine (7); Asts: Linda Pagrode (5)

Aréna Poprad, Poprad
Attendance: 50
Referees: Marco Giansanti, Tomasz Kudlicki, Uros Obrknezevi

2 August
13:30

Report

Hungary	51–66	Czech Republic
Scoring by quarter: 11–19, 16–15, 16–19, 8–13
Pts: Judit Mányoky (9); Rebs: Alma Németh (7); Asts: Bettina Baksa, Alma Németh (2)		Pts: Karolína Elhotová (16); Rebs: Barbora Kaspárková (12); Asts: Karolína Elhotová (3)

Sport Hall, Spišská Nová Ves
Attendance: 100
Referees: Elena Chernova, Igor Poljansek, Neil Wilkinson

3 August
13:30

Report

Latvia	66–70	Hungary
Scoring by quarter: 7–14, 12–18, 26–20, 21–18
Pts: Linda Pagrode (18); Rebs: Guna Lagzdina (8); Asts: Ieva Eida (3)		Pts: Lilla Adamecz (17); Rebs: Bettina Baksa, Brigitta Barta (6); Asts: Bettina Baksa (6)

Aréna Poprad, Poprad
Attendance: 50
Referees: Boris Gabara, Tomislav Vovk, Carole Delauné

3 August
13:30

Report

Czech Republic	62–70	Belgium
Scoring by quarter: 10–15, 15–13, 13–21, 24–21
Pts: Tereza Vyoralová (14); Rebs: Monika Satoranská (9); Asts: Monika Kůsová (6)		Pts: Lut De Meyer (21); Rebs: Lut De Meyer (9); Asts: Silke Storme (4)

Sport Hall, Spišská Nová Ves
Attendance: 50
Referees: Oscar Lefwerth, Mindaugas Vecerskis, Borys Shulga

4 August
13:30

Report

Hungary	34–74	Belgium
Scoring by quarter: 7–20, 8–17, 9–14, 10–23
Pts: Szidónia Katona (7); Rebs: Brigitta Barta (8); Asts: Noémi Czirják (3)		Pts: Hanne Mestdagh (15); Rebs: Jaleesa Maes (8); Asts: Ann Schyvens (8)

Aréna Poprad, Poprad
Attendance: 50
Referees: Panagiotis Anastopoulos, Elena Chernova, Fabiana Nitu

4 August
13:30

Report

Latvia	56–85	Czech Republic
Scoring by quarter: 15–21, 16–23, 9–24, 16–17
Pts: Anete Kirsteine (19); Rebs: Anete Kirsteine, Daiga Kuzmane (6); Asts: Anete Kirsteine, Linda Pagrode (3)		Pts: Monika Satoranská (16); Rebs: Barbora Zoubková (8); Asts: Monika Kůsová (7)

Sport Hall, Spišská Nová Ves
Attendance: 100
Referees: Miguel Anguel Perez Niz, Emin Mogulkoc, Shefqet Bekteshi

6 August
13:30

Report

Czech Republic	68–44	Hungary
Scoring by quarter: 15–8, 13–9, 17–20, 23–7
Pts: Karolína Elhotová (12); Rebs: Karolína Elhotová (10); Asts: Tereza Vyoralová (4)		Pts: Szidónia Katona, Flóra Szabó (7); Rebs: Alma Németh, Szidónia Katona (6); Asts: Judit Mányoky (4)

Sport Hall, Spišská Nová Ves
Attendance: 100
Referees: Igor Dragojevic, Dragan Kralj, Milan Brziak

6 August
15:45

Report

Latvia	43–63	Belgium
Scoring by quarter: 10–19, 12–12, 13–10, 8–22
Pts: Anete Kirsteine (11); Rebs: Anete Kirsteine (11); Asts: Dita Rozenberga (2)		Pts: Lut De Meyer (19); Rebs: Lut De Meyer (11); Asts: Ann Schyvens (3)

Sport Hall, Spišská Nová Ves
Attendance: 50
Referees: Neil Wilkinson, Igor Poljansek, Borys Shulga

7 August
09:00

Report

Hungary	76–61	Latvia
Scoring by quarter: 17–17, 17–17, 21–11, 21–16
Pts: Brigitta Barta (20); Rebs: Brigitta Barta (8); Asts: Judit Mányoky (5)		Pts: Agate Geka (16); Rebs: Daiga Kuzmane, Katrina Epnere (5); Asts: Kristiana Pumpure (4)

Aréna Poprad, Poprad
Attendance: 50
Referees: Oscar Lefwerth, Mindaugas Vecerskis, Uros Obrknezevic

7 August
11:15

Report

Belgium	89–71	Czech Republic
Scoring by quarter: 17–17, 17–17, 21–11, 21–16
Pts: Emmanuella Mayombo (24); Rebs: Caroline Bourlioux (7); Asts: Ann Schyvens (5)		Pts: Martina Čepelková (14); Rebs: Barbora Vechtova (6); Asts: three players (3)

Aréna Poprad, Poprad
Attendance: 70
Referees: Tomislav Vovk, Zdenko Zubak, Carole Delauné

8 August
09:30

Report

Belgium	61–62	Hungary
Scoring by quarter: 14–18, 17–11, 12–16, 18–17
Pts: Emmanuella Mayombo, Caroline Bourlioux (14); Rebs: Jaleesa Maes (10); Asts: Emmanuella Mayombo (6)		Pts: Bettina Baksa (15); Rebs: Dorina Zele (10); Asts: Bettina Baksa (6)

Sport Hall, Spišská Nová Ves
Attendance: 50
Referees: Igor Dragojevic, Tomislav Vovk, Oskars Lucis

8 August
11:45

Report

Czech Republic	85–58	Latvia
Scoring by quarter: 26–7, 22–14, 15–22, 22–15
Pts: Martina Čepelková (15); Rebs: Barbora Zoubková (8); Asts: three players (5)		Pts: Anete Kirsteine (15); Rebs: Anete Kirsteine, Guna Lagzdina (5); Asts: Linda Pagrode (8)

Sport Hall, Spišská Nová Ves
Attendance: 70
Referees: Borys Shulga, Uros Obrknezevic, Ervin Koci

== Knockout round ==
=== Championship ===
Quarter-finals
August 6 – Poprad
Spain	80
Ukraine	68
August 6 – Poprad
Lithuania	76
Slovenia	82
August 6 – Poprad
Russia	38
France	51
August 6 – Poprad
Italy	64
Sweden	38

Semi-finals
August 7 – Poprad
Spain	77
Slovenia	46
August 7 – Poprad
France	50
Italy	55

Final
August 8 – Poprad
Spain	61
Italy	66
Third place
August 8 – Poprad
Slovenia	43
France	66

==== Quarterfinals ====
6 August
13:30

Report

Spain	80–68	Ukraine
Scoring by quarter: 17–20, 19–18, 25–14, 19–16
Pts: Laura Gil (18); Rebs: Laura Gil (10); Asts: Queralt Casas (6)		Pts: Alina Iagupova (33); Rebs: Alina Iagupova (10); Asts: Alina Iagupova, Mariya Tkach (4)

Aréna Poprad, Poprad
Attendance: 200
Referees: Panagiotis Anastopoulos, Ilona Kučerová, Zdenko Zubak

6 August
15:45

Report

Russia	38–51	France
Scoring by quarter: 7–10, 12–16, 9–12, 10–13
Pts: Alexandra Stolyar, Svetlana Efimova (8); Rebs: Yulia Stepanova (9); Asts: three players (1)		Pts: Hélèna Akmouche (12); Rebs: Eléonore Grossemy, Sabrine Bouzenna (10); Asts: Sabrine Bouzenna (3)

Aréna Poprad, Poprad
Attendance: 100
Referees: Oskars Lucis, Emin Mogulkoc, Fabiana Nitu

6 August
18:00

Report

Italy	64–38	Sweden
Scoring by quarter: 18–8, 16–16, 16–4, 14–10
Pts: Beatrice Carta (11); Rebs: four players (5); Asts: Gaia Gorini (4)		Pts: Alice Nyström (10); Rebs: Alice Nyström (10); Asts: Mia Hakim (3)

Aréna Poprad, Poprad
Attendance: 200
Referees: Miguel Anguel Perez Niz, Zoltan Palla, Uros Obrknezevic

6 August
20:15

Report

Lithuania	76–82	Slovenia
Scoring by quarter: 21–20, 17–28, 23–21, 15–13
Pts: Santa Okockyte, Paulina Zaveckaite (17); Rebs: Paulina Zaveckaite (12); Asts: three players (3)		Pts: Nika Baric (38); Rebs: Tjasa Gortnar (5); Asts: Nika Baric (10)

Aréna Poprad, Poprad
Attendance: 200
Referees: Elena Chernova, Marco Giansanti, Tomasz Kudlicki

==== Semifinals ====
7 August
18:00

Report

Spain	77–46	Slovenia
Scoring by quarter: 16–14, 19–17, 25–10, 17–5
Pts: Elisabet Vivas, Marta Claret (14); Rebs: Laura Gil (10); Asts: Mariona Ortiz (5)		Pts: Nika Baric (24); Rebs: Tina Jakovina (6); Asts: Eva Rupnik (3)

Aréna Poprad, Poprad
Attendance: 300
Referees: Oskars Lucis, Igor Dragojevic, Emin Mogulkoc

7 August
20:15

Report

France	50–55	Italy
Scoring by quarter: 22–16, 5–8, 9–20, 14–11
Pts: Mélanie Devaux (10); Rebs: Lucie Barba (15); Asts: Sabrine Bouzenna, Maissa Radjati (4)		Pts: Francesca Dotto (14); Rebs: Lucia Morsiani (7); Asts: Gaia Gorini (3)

Aréna Poprad, Poprad
Attendance: 400
Referees: Panagiotis Anastopoulos, Elena Chernova, Zoltan Palla

==== Bronze medal game ====
8 August
18:00

Report

Slovenia	43–66	France
Scoring by quarter: 13–15, 11–20, 10–17, 9–14
Pts: Tina Jakovina (14); Rebs: Sandra Jevtovic (6); Asts: Nika Baric, Eva Rupnik (2)		Pts: Hélèna Akmouche (13); Rebs: Eléonore Grossemy, Lucie Barba (12); Asts: Eléonore Grossemy (4)

Aréna Poprad, Poprad
Attendance: 1,000
Referees: Oscar Lefwerth, Marco Giansanti, Shefqet Bekteshi

==== Final ====
8 August
20:15

Report

Spain	61–66	Italy
Scoring by quarter: 15–17, 16–14, 12–19, 18–16
Pts: Marina Delgado (14); Rebs: Laura Gil, Mariona Ortiz (9); Asts: Queralt Casas (4)		Pts: Beatrice Carta (17); Rebs: Gaia Gorini (8); Asts: Chiara Zanin, Nene Diene (4)

Aréna Poprad, Poprad
Attendance: 1000
Referees: Panagiotis Anastopoulos, Elena Chernova, Emin Mogulkoc

=== 5th–8th playoffs ===
Semi-finals
August 7 – Poprad
Ukraine	67
Lithuania	73
August 7 – Poprad
Russia	64
Sweden	58

Fifth place
August 8 – Poprad
Russia	78
Lithuania	64
Seventh place
August 8 – Poprad
Sweden	58
Ukraine	78

==== 5th–8th semifinals ====
7 August
13:30

Report

Russia	64–58	Sweden
Scoring by quarter: 16–23, 15–10, 19–13, 14–12
Pts: Yulia Poluyanova (19); Rebs: Alexandra Stolyar, Yulia Poluyanova (5); Asts: Anastasia Pasynkova (4)		Pts: Amanda Zahui (19); Rebs: Amanda Zahui (14); Asts: Amanda Zahui (5)

Aréna Poprad, Poprad
Attendance: 70
Referees: Tomasz Kudlicki, Dragan Kralj, Ilona Kučerová

7 August
15:45

Report

Ukraine	67–73	Lithuania
Scoring by quarter: 21–17, 9–18, 21–12, 16–26
Pts: Alina Iagupova (32); Rebs: Alina Iagupova, Lyudmyla Naumenko (9); Asts: Alina Iagupova (7)		Pts: Santa Okockyte (18); Rebs: Paulina Zaveckaite (12); Asts: Santa Okockyte (8)

Aréna Poprad, Poprad
Attendance: 100
Referees: Marco Giansanti, Neil Wilkinson, Ervin Koci

==== 7th place playoff ====
8 August
13:30

Report

Sweden	58–78	Ukraine
Scoring by quarter: 15–16, 19–23, 15–21, 9–18
Pts: Alina Iagupova (29); Rebs: Lyudmyla Naumenko (19); Asts: Alina Iagupova (6)		Pts: Amanda Zahui (16); Rebs: Amanda Zahui (10); Asts: Mia Hakim (5)

Aréna Poprad, Poprad
Attendance: 100
Referees: Zoltan Palla, Mindaugas Vecerskis, Fabiana Nitu

==== 5th place playoff ====
8 August
15:45

Report

Russia	78–64	Lithuania
Scoring by quarter: 22–14, 23–17, 20–19, 13–14
Pts: Santa Okockyte (18); Rebs: Laura Svaryte (16); Asts: four players (2)		Pts: Yulia Stepanova, Svetlana Efimova (19); Rebs: Yulia Stepanova (8); Asts: Anastasia Pasynkova (6)

Aréna Poprad, Poprad
Attendance: 100
Referees: Miguel Anguel Perez Niz, Tomasz Kudlicki, Tomislav Vovku

=== 9th–12th playoffs ===
Semi-finals
August 6 – Spišská Nová Ves
Slovakia	65
Poland	62
August 6 – Spišská Nová Ves
Turkey	78
Serbia	73

Ninth place
August 8 – Spišská Nová Ves
Slovakia	65
Turkey	63
Eleventh place
August 8 – Spišská Nová Ves
Poland	73
Serbia	71

==== 9th–12th semifinals ====
6 August
18:00

Report

Slovakia	65–62	Poland
Scoring by quarter: 18–20, 11–14, 17–14, 19–14
Pts: Martina Kissová (18); Rebs: Martina Kissová (11); Asts: Noema Brádnanská (6)		Pts: three players (12); Rebs: Kinga Bandyk (8); Asts: Magdalena Zietara (4)

Sport Hall, Spišská Nová Ves
Attendance: 800
Referees: Oscar Lefwerth, Tomislav Vovk, Ervin Koci

6 August
20:15

Report

Turkey	78–73 (OT)	Serbia
Scoring by quarter: 21–27, 10–17, 19–15, 15–6, Overtime: 13–8
Pts: Özge Kavurmacıoğlu (21); Rebs: Özge Kavurmacıoğlu (11); Asts: Ayşegül Günay (5)		Pts: Snezana Colic (22); Rebs: Ivana Brajkovic (14); Asts: Kaja Stankovic (10)

Sport Hall, Spišská Nová Ves
Attendance: 50
Referees: Mindaugas Vecerskis, Carole Delauné, Shefqet Bekteshi

==== 11th place playoff ====
8 August
14:00

Report

Poland	73–71	Serbia
Scoring by quarter: 12–17, 18–21, 15–14, 28–19
Pts: Magdalena Zietara (21); Rebs: Agata Szczepanik (4); Asts: Magdalena Zietara (6)		Pts: Snezana Colic (25); Rebs: Ivana Brajkovic (16); Asts: three players (3)

Sport Hall, Spišská Nová Ves
Attendance: 50
Referees: Neil Wilkinson, Zdenko Zubak, Carole Delauné

==== 9th place playoff ====
8 August
16:15

Report

Slovakia	65–63	Turkey
Scoring by quarter: 14–20, 19–14, 19–17, 13–12
Pts: Sabína Oroszová (19); Rebs: Sabína Oroszová (16); Asts: Denisa Domiterová, Petra Bartánusová (5)		Pts: Özge Kavurmacıoğlu (17); Rebs: Özge Kavurmacıoğlu (15); Asts: Ayşegül Günay (3)

Sport Hall, Spišská Nová Ves
Attendance: 1,500
Referees: Igor Poljansek, Dragan Kralj, Ilona Kučerová

== Final standings ==
Rank	Team	Record
Gold medal	Italy	9–0
Silver medal	Spain	8–1
Bronze medal	France	6–3
4th	Slovenia	5–4
5th	Russia	5–3
6th	Lithuania	5–4
7th	Ukraine	4–5
8th	Sweden	3–6
9th	Slovakia	4–4
10th	Turkey	4–4
11th	Poland	2–6
12th	Serbia	1–7
13th	Belgium	4–5
14th	Czech Republic	4–5
15th	Hungary	3–6
16th	Latvia	1–8

== Awards ==
2010 FIBA Europe Under-18 Championship for Women winner

Italy
Second title

Most Valuable Player
(Slovenia) Nika Baric

All-Tournament Team

- (Slovenia) Nika Baric
- (Spain) Queralt Casas
- (Slovakia) Martina Kissova
- (Italy) Gaia Gorini
- (Spain) Laura Gil

== Statistical leaders ==
Points

Name	PPG
(Ukraine) Alina Iagupova	32.6
(Slovenia) Nika Baric	23.3
(Lithuania) Santa Okockyte	18.6
(Turkey) Özge Kavurmacıoğlu	17.1
(Slovenia) Tjasa Gortnar	16.5

Rebounds

Name	RPG
(Turkey) Özge Kavurmacıoğlu	11.3
(Ukraine) Lyudmyla Naumenko	11.0
(Serbia) Ivana Brajkovic	11.0
(Lithuania) Paulina Zaveckaite	10.2
(Lithuania) Laura Svaryte	9.9

Assists

Name	APG
(Slovenia) Nika Baric	5.9
(Ukraine) Alina Iagupova	3.8
(Poland) Magdalena Zietara	3.6
(Lithuania) Santa Okockyte	3.6
(Czech Republic) Monika Kůsová	3.4

Blocks

Name	BPG
(Slovenia) Tjasa Gortnar	2.2
(Ukraine) Alina Iagupova	1.8
(Sweden) Amanda Zahui	1.7
(Czech Republic) Barbora Vechtova	1.6
(Slovakia) Martina Kissová	1.5

Steals

Name	SPG
(Italy) Beatrice Carta	2.9
(Ukraine) Alina Iagupova	2.8
(Slovakia) Noema Brádnanská	2.8
(Spain) Mariona Ortiz	2.7
(Poland) Paulina Kuras	2.6
