= Belarus women's national under-18 basketball team =

Belarus
- FIBA zone: FIBA Europe
- National federation: Belarusian Basketball Federation

U19 World Cup
- Appearances: None

U18 European Championship
- Appearances: 7
- Medals: None

U18 European Championship Division B
- Appearances: 8
- Medals: (gold) Gold: (2005, 2012); (silver) Silver: (2018)

The Belarus women's national under-18 basketball team is the national women's basketball team that represented Belarus in international under-18 tournaments. The national team is administered by the Belarusian Basketball Federation.

After the 2022 Russian invasion of Ukraine, the FIBA suspended Belarus from participating in basketball and 3x3 basketball competitions.

== FIBA U18 Women's European Championship participations ==
Year	Division A	Division B
2004	10th	
2005		1st
2006	9th	
2007	14th	
2008	13th	
2009	15th	
2010		4th
2011		6th
2012		1st
2013	15th	
2015		11th
2016		5th
2017		6th
2018		2nd
2019	9th	

== See also ==
- Belarus women's national basketball team
- Belarus women's national under-16 basketball team
- Belarus men's national under-18 basketball team
