= Aréna Poprad =

Indoor sporting arena in Poprad, Slovakia

- Interactive map of Aréna Poprad
- Location: Uherova 2, Poprad, Slovakia
- Coordinates: 49°2′47.26″N 20°17′27.20″E
- Owner: City of Poprad
- Capacity: 1,968

Construction
- Opened: November 11, 2006
- Cost: 273,551 Sk

Aréna Poprad is an indoor sporting arena located in Poprad, Slovakia. The arena was built in 2006. The capacity of the arena is 1,968 people. The 2010 FIBA Europe Under-18 Championship for Women was the 27th edition of the FIBA Europe Under-18 Championship for Women. 16 teams featured the competition, held in Aréna Poprad, Poprad, Slovakia from July 25–August 8.

== FIVB Volleyball World League ==
The arena was one of the venues at the 2017 editions of the FIVB Volleyball World League, and held the following matches:

=== 2017 FIVB Volleyball World League ===
Date	Time		Score		Set 1	Set 2	Set 3	Set 4	Set 5	Total	Report
2 Jun	15:00	Australia	3–2	Portugal	21–25	25–20	25–18	22–25	20–18	113–106	P2 P3
2 Jun	18:00	Slovakia	3–0	Japan	25–20	25–20	27–25			77–65	P2 P3
3 Jun	15:00	Japan	2–3	Portugal	21–25	25–19	25–21	24–26	9–15	104–106	P2 P3
3 Jun	18:00	Slovakia	3–1	Australia	25–22	21–25	30–28	25–22		101–97	P2 P3
4 Jun	15:00	Australia	1–3	Japan	18–25	25–17	21–25	22–25		86–92	P2 P3
4 Jun	18:00	Slovakia	3–0	Portugal	25–20	25–23	25–19			75–62	P2 P3
