= Sweden women's national under-18 and under-19 basketball team =

Youth basketball team representing Sweden

Sweden
- FIBA zone: FIBA Europe
- National federation: SBBF

U19 World Cup
- Appearances: 1
- Medals: (silver) Silver: 1 (2007)

U18 EuroBasket
- Appearances: 18
- Medals: (bronze) Bronze: 2 (2006, 2009)

U18 EuroBasket Division B
- Appearances: 7
- Medals: (gold) Gold: 2 (2016, 2025); (silver) Silver: 1 (2005)
Home	Away

The Sweden women's national under-18 and under-19 basketball team is a national basketball team of Sweden, administered by the Svenska Basketbollförbundet. It represents the country in under-18 and under-19 women's international basketball competitions.

== FIBA U18 Women's EuroBasket participations ==
Year	Division A	Division B
1981	10th	
1983	9th	
1984	7th	
1986	10th	
1990	5th	
1992	11th	
2005		2nd place, silver medalist(s)
2006	3rd place, bronze medalist(s)	
2007	12th	
2008	10th	
2009	3rd place, bronze medalist(s)	
2010	8th	
2011	4th	

Year	Division A	Division B
2012	10th	
2013	8th	
2014	16th	
2015		4th
2016		1st place, gold medalist(s)
2017	8th	
2018	15th	
2019		4th
2022	15th	
2023		13th
2024		17th
2025		1st place, gold medalist(s)
2026	14th	

== FIBA Under-19 Women's Basketball World Cup participations ==
Year	Result
2007	2nd place, silver medalist(s)

== See also ==
- Sweden women's national basketball team
- Sweden women's national under-16 basketball team
- Sweden women's national under-20 basketball team
