= Özge Kavurmacıoğlu =

Turkish basketball player

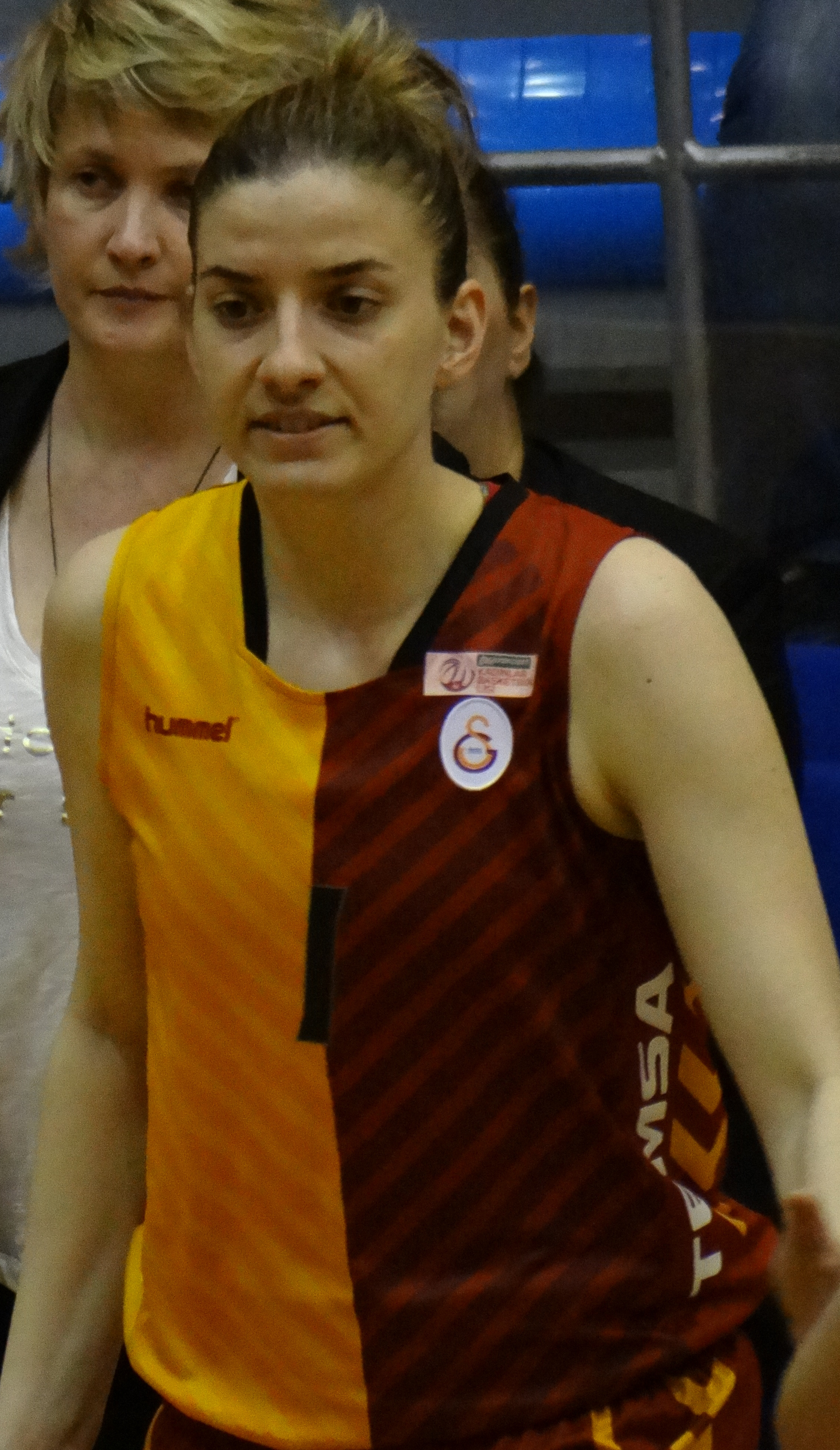

Fenerbahçe
- Position: Small Forward
- League: Turkish Women's Basketball League-Euroleague Women

Personal information
- Born: March 7, 1993 (age 33) İzmit, Turkey
- Listed height: 6 ft 2 in (1.88 m)
- Listed weight: 170 lb (77 kg)

Career information
- Playing career: 2010–present
Medals
Women's basketball
Representing Turkey
FIBA Europe Under-20 Championship for Women
Bronze medal – third place	2013 Samsun	Team
Bronze medal – third place	2012 Debrecen	Team

Özge Kavurmacıoğlu (born 7 March 1993 in İzmit, Turkey) is a Turkish basketball player. She plays for Fenerbahçe as both small and power forward position. She joined Fenerbahçe Istanbul in 2006 at the youth level and progressed to the senior level in 2010. She was loaned to Beşiktaş in 2012.

== Honors ==
=== Club ===
- Turkish Championship (2): 2010–11, 2011–12
- Turkish Presidents Cup (1): 2010

=== National ===
- 2012 FIBA Europe Under-20 Championship for Women - Bronze
- 2013 FIBA Europe Under-20 Championship for Women - Bronze

== See also ==
- Turkish women in sports
