= 2009 FIBA Europe Under-18 Championship for Women =

Tournament details
- Host country: Sweden
- City: Södertälje
- Dates: 2–12 July 2009
- Teams: 16
- Venues: 2 (in 1 host city)

Final positions
- Champions: Spain (3rd title)
- Runners-up: France
- Third place: Sweden
- Fourth place: Czech Republic

Tournament statistics
- MVP: (Sweden) Cleopatra Forsman-Goga
- Top scorer: (Ukraine) Olga Maznichenko (21.9 ppg)
- Top rebounds: (Ukraine) Olesia Malashenko (13.8 rpg)
- Top assists: (Poland) Magdalena Teresa Zietara (3.8 apg)

The 2009 FIBA Europe Under-18 Women's Championship or simply known as the 2009 Youth EuroBasket, was the 26th edition of the Under-18 European Championships. This tournament was hosted by Sweden for the first time in the history of the championships. The tournament was won by Spain for the third time after defeating the France in the final, 64–54. Hosts Sweden clinched the bronze medal after beating Czech Republic, 67–54.

== Venues ==
Arena	Capacity	Notes
Täljehallen	2,100 (12,500 for concerts)	Used in preliminary, qualifying and final round.
Rosenborg	—N/a	Used in the preliminary and Classification round

== Format ==
- Preliminary round: Teams are split into four groups of 4 teams each, playing in a single round-robin format, teams playing against each other in their respective group once. The top three teams in each group qualify for the second round, while the last placed team are relegated to the classification rounds.
  - Group tournament ranking system:
    - Games won: 2 points
    - Games lost by ordinary circumstances: 1 point
    - Games lost by default: 1 point, and the score at the time of stoppage if the defaulting team is trailing, or a score of 2–0 if it is leading or if the game is tied.
    - Games lost by forfeit: 0 points and a score of 20–0 against the forfeiting team.
  - Tiebreaking criteria:
1. Game results between tied teams via points system above
2. Goal average between games of the tied teams
3. Goal average for all games of the tied teams
4. Drawing of lots

Second round: Groups A and B shall comprise Group E, while Groups C and D shall comprise Group F. Teams play against teams that have not played yet once, while the records for the teams that they had already met that also advanced are carried over. Same points and tiebreaking system as in the preliminary round. Top four advance to the final round.

- Second round: The qualifying teams from Groups A and B forms Groups E, and teams from Groups C and D, forms Group F. Those teams in each group will play again in single round-robin format. Only the top 4 teams advance to the final round (knockout stage).
- Final round: SIngle-elimination tournament for the championship
  - 3rd–4th classification: Playoff for semifinals losers
  - 5th–8th classification: Single-elimination tournament for quarterfinals losers
  - 9th–12th classification: Single-elimination tournament for fifth and sixth placers in the second round
  - 13th–15th classification: Round-robin classification for fourth placers in the preliminary round.

== Preliminary round ==
- All times are in Swedish Standard Time (UTC+2).

=== Group A ===
Pos	Team	Pld	W	L	PF	PA	PD	Pts	Qualification
1	Serbia	3	3	0	238	153	+85	6	Advance to second round
2	Sweden	3	2	1	188	180	+8	5	Advance to second round
3	Poland	3	1	2	203	171	+32	4	Advance to second round
4	Bulgaria	3	0	3	115	240	−125	3	Classification Group G

Source: FIBA Archives
Rules for classification: 1. points; 2. win–loss record; 3. ratio of points scored to points allowed; 4. quotient system

2 July
21:00

Sweden	74–44	Bulgaria
Scoring by quarter: 19–11, 21–8, 19–10, 15–15
Pts: Abdi 21; Rebs: Abdi 10; Asts: Kabengano 4		Pts: Georgieva 11; Rebs: Tyutyundzhieva 8 Asts: Stoycheva 2

Täljehallen, Södertälje
Referees: Milan Brizak (SVK), Anna Cardus (ESP), Piotr Ivashkov (BLR)

2 July
18:15

Poland	64–75	Serbia
Scoring by quarter: 22–18, 13–26, 23–13, 6–18
Pts: Zietara 12; Rebs: Bandyk 7 Asts: Kuras 3		Pts: Jovanovic 21; Rebs: Bandyk 7 Asts: Kuras 3

Täljehallen, Södertälje
Referees: Paolo Taurino (ITA), Martynas Gudas (LTU), Zaza Machaladze (GEO)

3 July
17:30

Sweden	66–57	Poland
Scoring by quarter: 17–11, 18–14, 10–20, 21–12
Pts: Forsman-Goga 19; Rebs: Forsman-Goga 15; Asts: Forsman-Goga 5		Pts: Misiuk 19; Rebs: Misiuk 11; Asts: Casimiro 5

Rosenborg, Södertälje
Referees: Timothy Andrew Frederick Brown (NZL), Sérgio Silva (POR), Vincent Delestrée (BEL)

3 July
19:45

Serbia	84–41	Bulgaria
Scoring by quarter: 13–10, 22–3, 29–9, 20–19
Pts: Vucuróvić 14; Rebs: Bubnjević 10; Asts: Jovanóvić 3		Pts: Kocheva 12; Rebs: Kocheva 6 Asts: Kocheva 3

Rosenborg, Södertälje
Referees: Robert Vyklicky (CZE), Elena Chernova (RUS), Borys Shulga (UKR)

4 July
16:00

Serbia	79–48	Sweden
Scoring by quarter: 18–16, 23–16, 19–10, 19–6
Pts: Vućuróvić 14; Rebs: Markovic 8 Asts: Vućuróvić 3		Pts: Forsman-Goga 20; Rebs: Abdi 8 Asts: Abdi 4

Täljehallen, Södertälje
Attendance: 1,100
Referees: Paolo Taurino (ITA), Oskars Lucis (LAT), Carole Delauné (FRA)

4 July
15:15

Poland	82–30	Bulgaria
Scoring by quarter: 24–1, 23–12, 12–10, 23–7
Pts: Bandyk 17; Rebs: Bandyk 14; Asts: Zietara 7		Pts: Nakova 6 Rebs: Tyutyundzhieva 6 Asts: Kocheva 4

Rosenborg, Södertälje
Referees: Ademir Zurapovic (BIH), Ognjen Jokic (MNE), Ismail Özgün (TUR)

=== Group B ===
Pos	Team	Pld	W	L	PF	PA	PD	Pts	Qualification
1	Spain	3	3	0	250	156	+94	6	Advance to second round
2	Latvia	3	2	1	214	192	+22	5	Advance to second round
3	Belgium	3	1	2	178	190	−12	4	Advance to second round
4	Turkey	3	0	3	144	248	−104	3	Classification Group G

Source: FIBA Archives
Rules for classification: 1. points; 2. overall goal average 3. win–loss record 4. quotient system

2 July
13:45

Boxscore

Latvia	88–50	Turkey
Scoring by quarter: 26–9, 26–9, 12–22, 24–10
Pts: Niedola 26; Rebs: Gotfrida 10; Asts: 6 players 1 each		Pts: Günay 12; Rebs: Ural 7 Asts: Günay 2

Täljehallen, Södertälje
Referees: Oscar LEFWERTH (SWE), Borys SHULGA (UKR), Carole DELAUNÉ (FRA)

2 July
16:00

Boxscore

Spain	77–49	Belgium
Scoring by quarter: 15–14, 21–19, 23–10, 18–6
Pts: Rodriguez 15; Rebs: Blé Ossepe 5 Asts: Ortiz Vives 2		Pts: Celus 12; Rebs: Raman 5 Asts: three players 1 each

Täljehallen, Södertälje
Referees: Timothy Andrew Frederick BROWN (NZL), Robert VYKLICKY (CZE), Elena CHERNOVA (RUS)

3 July
13:00

Belgium	61–64	Latvia
Scoring by quarter: 8–13, 20–9, 20–18, 13–24
Pts: Mayombo 14; Rebs: Raman 10; Asts: Bourlioux 3		Pts: Niedola 17; Rebs: Vidola 15; Asts: Niedola 6

Rosenborg, Södertälje
Referees: Caslav CUKALOVIC (SRB), Milan BRZIAK (SVK), Zlatin KARANIKOLOV (BUL)

3 July
13:45

Boxscore

Spain	92–45	Turkey
Scoring by quarter: 22–9, 26–20, 23–7, 21–9
Pts: Gimeno Martinez 16; Rebs: Blé Ossepe 10; Asts: Casas Carreras 3		Pts: Yavas 13; Rebs: Demirok 7 Asts: Güler 4

Täljehallen, Södertälje
Referees: Tomasz KUDLICKI (POL), Zaza MACHALADZE (GEO), Piotr IVASHKOV (BLR)

4 July

Latvia	vs.	Spain

Täljehallen, Södertälje

4 July

Belgium	vs.	Turkey

Täljehallen, Södertälje

=== Group C ===
Pos	Team	Pld	W	L	PF	PA	PD	Pts	Qualification
1	France	3	3	0	235	138	+97	6	Advance to second round
2	Ukraine	3	2	1	208	220	−12	5	Advance to second round
3	Russia	3	1	2	196	218	−22	4	Advance to second round
4	Slovakia	3	0	3	161	224	−63	3	Classification Group G

Source: FIBA Archives
Rules for classification: a. points b. goal average; c. win–loss record; d. quotient system

2 July
13:00

Boxscore

Russia	82–57	Slovakia
Scoring by quarter: 22–13, 15–17, 19–10, 26–17
Pts: Poluyanova 16; Rebs: Poluyanova 7 Asts: Pasynkova 4		Pts: Páleníková, Nagyová 13; Rebs: three players 6 each Asts: Burianová 3

Rosenborg, Södertälje
Referees: Lahdo Sharro (SWE), Gabriel Roceanu (ROU), Maja Vukanovic (SRB)

2 July
15:15

Boxscore

Ukraine	43–97	France
Scoring by quarter: 12–27, 11–30, 12–22, 8–18
Pts: Rykulska 12; Rebs: Malashenko 8 Asts: Chukhriy, Zavidna 1 each		Pts: Okou Zouzouo 15; Rebs: Okou Zouzouo 9 Asts: Niamke 7

Rosenborg, Södertälje
Referees: Caslav Cukalovic (SRB), Sérgio Silva (POR), Ismail Özgün (TUR)

3 July
15:15

Boxscore

Ukraine	82–61	Russia
Scoring by quarter: 22–13, 20–16, 18–28, 22–4
Pts: Malashenko 22; Rebs: Malashenko 15; Asts: Iagupova 4		Pts: Medvedeva 13; Rebs: Poluyanova 12; Asts: Stolyar, Medvedeva 2 each

Rosenborg, Södertälje
Referees: Paolo Taurino (ITA), Oskars Lucis (LAT), Ognjen Jokic (MNE)

3 July
20:30

Slovakia	vs.	France

=== Group D ===
Pos	Team	Pld	W	L	PF	PA	PD	Pts	Qualification
1	Lithuania	3	2	1	188	160	+28	5 (Note: Lithuania wins over point differential among tied teams with +17, -7 for Czech Republic, and -10 for Italy, among their head-to-head matches.)	Advance to second round
2	Czech Republic	3	2	1	187	182	+5	5	Advance to second round
3	Italy	3	2	1	155	160	−5	5	Advance to second round
4	Belarus	3	0	3	169	197	−28	3	Classification Group G

Source: Unknown
Notes:

2 July
17:30

Boxscore

Belarus	46–51	Italy
Scoring by quarter: 13–11, 11–13, 12–21, 10–6
Pts: Betseika, Filonchyk 11 each Rebs: Bohdan, Filonchyk 8 each Asts: Aliaksandra Shymkaviak (3)		Pts: Federica Tognalini (14); Rebs: Federica Tognalini (13); Asts: Four players 2 each

Rosenborg, Södertälje
Referees: Ademir Zurapovic (BIH), Oskars Lucis (LAT), Vincent Delestree (BEL)

2 July
21:00

Boxscore

Czech Republic	44–71	Lithuania
Scoring by quarter: 18–24, 11–20, 10–13, 5–14
Pts: Martina Knoflícková (9); Rebs: Three players 4 each Asts: Sedlácková, Filarová 2 each		Pts: Gintare Mazionyte (14); Rebs: Siksniute, Mazionyte 11 each Asts: Diana Zintikaite (4)

Rosenborg, Södertälje
Referees: Ognjen Jokic (MNE), Tomasz Kudlicki (POL), Zlatin Karanikolov (BUL)

3 July
18:15

Boxscore

Lithuania	70–59	Belarus
Scoring by quarter: 18–11, 18–20, 24–16, 10–12
Pts: Monika Grigalauskyte (13); Rebs: Egle Siksniute (11); Asts: Gintare Mazionyte (4)		Pts: Maryia Rashchenia (16); Rebs: Maryia Filonchyk (7); Asts: Betseika, Kakhanskaya 3 each

Täljehallen, Södertälje
Referees: Lahdo Sharro (SWE), Carole Delaune (FRA), Maja Vukanovic (SRB)

3 July
16:00

Boxscore

Czech Republic	67–47	Italy
Scoring by quarter: 16–19, 15–9, 18–15, 18–4
Pts: Lenka Bartakova (15); Rebs: Alena Hanusova (13); Asts: Lenka Bartakova (4)		Pts: Laura Spreafico (19); Rebs: Federica Tognalini (13); Asts: Oriana Milazzo (3)

Täljehallen, Södertälje
Referees: Oscar Lefworth (SWE), Ismail Ozgun (TUR), Gabriel Roceanu (ROU)

4 July
13:45

Belarus	64–76	Czech Republic
Scoring by quarter: 15–16, 21–18, 15–19, 13–23
Pts: Karalina Betseika (22); Rebs: Nadzeya Bohdan (10); Asts: Maryia Rashchenia (5)		Pts: Alena Hanusova (22); Rebs: Alena Hanusova (20); Asts: Lenka Bartakova (5)

Täljehallen, Södertälje
Referees: Timothy Andrew Frederick Brown (NZL), Anna Cardus (ESP), Caslav Cukalovic (SRB)

4 July

Boxscore

Lithuania	47–57	Italy
Scoring by quarter: –, –, –, –

Rosenborg, Södertälje

== Second round ==
=== Group E ===
Pos	Team	Pld	W	L	PF	PA	PD	Pts	Qualification
1	Spain	5	5	0	416	277	+139	10	Advanced to the final round
2	Serbia	5	3	2	328	327	+1	8	Advanced to the final round
3	Sweden	5	3	2	322	334	−12	8	Advanced to the final round
4	Latvia	5	2	3	310	341	−31	7	Advanced to the final round
5	Belgium	5	2	3	324	342	−18	7	Relegated to classification 9–12
6	Poland	5	0	5	305	384	−79	5	Relegated to classification 9–12

Source: Updated FIBA Archives

6 July 2009	Latvia	53–72	Sweden	Södertälje
18:15	Scoring by quarter: 9–18, 19–14, 6–22, 19–18
	Pts: Sabine Niedola (19); Rebs: Sabine Niedola (13); Asts: Anete Cunda (3)	Boxscore	Pts: Farhiya Abdi (25); Rebs: Farhiya Abdi (15); Asts: Neffati, Abdi 3 each	Arena: Täljehallen; Referees: Robert Vylicky (CZE), Sérgio Silva (POR), Ismail Özgün (TUR)

6 July 2009	Belgium	64–62	Serbia	Södertälje
16:00	Scoring by quarter: 17–17, 12–18, 22–16, 13–11
	Pts: Jana Raman (23); Rebs: Jana Raman (10); Asts: Noémie Mayombo (4)	Boxscore	Pts: Tina Jovanovic (13); Rebs: Tina Jovanovic (16); Asts: Tina Jovanovic (3)	Arena: Täljehallen; Referees: Milan Brizak (SVK), Gabriel Roceanu (ROU), Zlatin Karanikolov (BUL)

6 July 2009	Poland	52–86	Spain
	Scoring by quarter: –, –, –, –

7 July 2009	Belgium	87–69	Poland	Rosenborg
	Scoring by quarter: –, –, –, –

7 July 2009	Serbia	64–61	Latvia
	Scoring by quarter: –, –, –, –

7 July 2009	Spain	82–66	Sweden
	Scoring by quarter: –, –, –, –

8 July 2009	Poland	63–70	Latvia	Södertälje
	Scoring by quarter: 15–19, 8–14, 20–19, 20–18
				Arena: Täljehallen

8 July 2009	Sweden	70–63	Belgium
	Scoring by quarter: –, –, –, –

8 July 2009	Serbia	48–90	Spain
	Scoring by quarter: –, –, –, –

=== Group F ===
Pos	Team	Pld	W	L	PF	PA	PD	Pts	Qualification
1	France	5	5	0	385	233	+152	10	Advance to the final round
2	Lithuania	5	3	2	316	307	+9	8	Advance to the final round
3	Czech Republic	5	3	2	300	322	−22	8	Advance to the final round
4	Ukraine	5	2	3	360	295	+65	7	Advance to the final round
5	Italy	5	2	3	274	305	−31	7	Relegated to classification 9–12
6	Russia	5	0	5	271	344	−73	5	Relegated to classification 9–12

Source: Updated FIBA Archives

== Classification Playoffs ==
=== Group G ===
A single round-robin classification group to determine 13th through 16th placers.

Pos	Team	Pld	W	L	PF	PA	PD	Pts
1	Turkey	3	3	0	223	158	+65	6
2	Slovakia	3	2	1	167	166	+1	5
3	Belarus	3	1	2	207	184	+23	4
4	Bulgaria	3	0	3	136	225	−89	3

Source: Updated FIBA Archives

6 July
13:00

Boxscore

Belarus	82–52	Bulgaria
Scoring by quarter: 17–11, 27–10, 21–13, 17–18
Pts: Filonchyk 23; Rebs: Filonchyk 9 Asts: Betseika 5		Pts: Georgieva 13; Rebs: Tyutyundzhieva 10; Asts: Dencheva 2

Rosenborg, Södertälje
Referees: Martynas Gudas (LTU), Tomasz Kudlicki (POL), Vincent Delestrée (BEL)

6 July
15:15

Boxscore

Slovakia	47–68	Turkey
Scoring by quarter: 13–10, 10–20, 9–24, 15–14
Pts: Kissová 14; Rebs: Baburová 9 Asts: Baburová 5		Pts: Yavas 23; Rebs: Güler 8 Asts: Yavas 7

Rosenborg, Södertälje
Referees: Anna Cardus (ESP), Oskars Lucis (LAT), Elena Chernova (RUS)

8 July
13:00

Boxscore

Slovakia	56–39	Bulgaria
Scoring by quarter: 10–12, 13–12, 22–3, 11–12
Pts: Páleníková 15; Rebs: Firkalová 12; Asts: Páleníkova 3		Pts: Todorova 19; Rebs: Todorova 8 Asts: Kocheva 5

Rosenborg, Södertälje
Referees: Borys Shulga (UKR), Maja Vukanović (SRB), Zaza Machaladze (GEO)

8 July
15:15

Boxscore

Turkey	68–66	Belarus
Scoring by quarter: 10–13, 17–14, 15–17, 26–22
Pts: Yavas 16; Rebs: Ural 12; Asts: Yavas 6		Pts: Musatava 16; Rebs: Filonchyk 10; Asts: Betseika 6

Rosenborg, Södertälje
Referees: Paolo Taurino (ITA), Ademir Zurapovic (BIH), Gabriel Roceanu (ROU)

10 July
13:00

Boxscore

Bulgaria	45–87	Turkey
Scoring by quarter: 15–13, 3–29, 10–25, 17–20
Pts: Dencheva 14; Rebs: Tyutyundzhieva 8 Asts: Todorova 3		Pts: Yavas 23; Rebs: Ural 12; Asts: Derin 4

Rosenborg, Södertälje
Referees: Carole Delauné (FRA), Tomasz Kudlicki (POL), Vincent Delestrée (BEL)

10 July
13:00

Boxscore

Slovakia	64–59	Belarus
Scoring by quarter: 14–12, 21–9, 23–15, 6–23
Pts: Kissová 18; Rebs: Kissová 10; Asts: Kissová 3		Pts: Betseika 25; Rebs: Filonchyk 14; Asts: Betseika 3

Rosenborg, Södertälje
Referees: Oscar Lefwerth (SWE), Caslav Cukalovic (SRB), Ognjen Jokic (MNE)

=== Classification 9–12 ===
Classification semifinals
Belgium	64
Russia	67
Italy	67
Poland	57

9th place match
Russia	65
Italy	52
11th place match
Belgium	87
Poland	51

10 July
17:30

Boxscore

Belgium	64–67	Russia
Scoring by quarter: 15–12, 11–14, 17–13, 21–28
Pts: Mayombo 22; Rebs: Bourlioux 6 Asts: Celus 5		Pts: Medvedeva 17; Rebs: Stepanova 15; Asts: Medvedeva 5

Rosenborg, Södertälje
Referees: Ismail Özgün (TUR), Oskars Lucis (LAT), Borys Shulga (UKR)

10 July
19:45

Boxscore

Italy	67–57	Poland
Scoring by quarter: 17–18, 21–13, 6–14, 23–12
Pts: Bestagno 15; Rebs: Tognalini 7 Asts: Bestagno 7		Pts: Zietara, Misiuk 15 each Rebs: Cossengue Casimiro 7 Asts: Zietara 7

Rosenborg, Södertälje
Referees: Gabriel Roceanu (ROU), Milan Brziak (SVK), Zaza Machaladze (GEO)

==== 11th place match ====
12 July
13:00

Boxscore

Belgium	87–51	Poland
Scoring by quarter: 28–8, 17–19, 20–12, 22–12

Rosenborg, Södertälje
Referees: Oskars Lucis (LAT), Gabriel Roceanu (ROU), Zaza Machaladze (GEO)

==== 9th place match ====
12 July
15:15

Boxscore

Italy	52–65	Russia
Scoring by quarter: 26–25, 13–11, 4–9, 9–20

Rosenborg, Södertälje
Referees: Ognjen Jokic (MNE), Caslav Cukalovic (SRB), Vincent Delestrée (BEL)

== Final round ==
5th place match
F2	Lithuania	53
E2	Serbia	70
7th place match
F4	Ukraine	61
E4	Latvia	72

5th–8th place semifinals
F4	Ukraine	82
F2	Lithuania	84
E4	Latvia	74
E2	Serbia	80

Quarterfinals
E1	Spain	94
F4	Ukraine	63
F2	Lithuania	60
E3	Sweden	79
F1	France	55
E4	Latvia	54
F3	Czech Republic	80
E2	Serbia	68

Semifinals
E1	Spain	72
E3	Sweden	53
F1	France	74
F3	Czech Republic	52

Final
E1	Spain	64
F1	France	54
Bronze medal match
E3	Sweden	67
F3	Czech Republic	54

=== Quarterfinals ===
10 July
18:15

Boxscore

Spain	94–63	Ukraine
Scoring by quarter: 31–7, 18–24, 24–9, 21–23
Pts: Gastaminza Ganuza 20; Rebs: Gastaminza Ganuza 7 Asts: Ortiz 5		Pts: Maznichenko 17; Rebs: Malashenko 12; Asts: Malashenko 3

Täljehallen, Södertälje
Referees: Timothy Andrew Frederick Brown (NZL), Ademir Zurapovic (BIH), Zlatin Karanikolov (BUL)

10 July
16:00

Boxscore

Serbia	68–80	Czech Republic
Scoring by quarter: 23–17, 15–16, 20–20, 22–15
Pts: Krnjic 20; Rebs: Jovanovic 13; Asts: Colic 3		Pts: Hanusová 19; Rebs: Bartàkovà 6 Asts: Záplatová 4

Täljehallen, Södertälje
Referees: Lahdo Sharro (SWE), Martynas Gudas (LTU), Elena Chernova (RUS)

10 July
13:45

Boxscore

France	55–54	Latvia
Scoring by quarter: 17–19, 11–7, 20–10, 7–18

Täljehallen, Södertälje
Referees: Anna Cardus (ESP), Sérgio Silva (POR), Piotr Ivashkov (BLR)

10 July
20:30

Boxscore

Lithuania	60–79	Sweden
Scoring by quarter: 16–27, 10–16, 18–6, 16–30
Pts: Zintikaite 12		Pts: Forsman-Goga 25

Täljehallen, Södertälje
Referees: Paolo Taurino (ITA), Robert Vyklicky (CZE), Maja Vukanovic (SRB)

=== 5th-8th-place semifinals ===
Täljehallen, Södertälje

Täljehallen, Södertälje

=== Semifinals ===
Täljehallen, Södertälje

Täljehallen, Södertälje

=== Seventh place match ===
Täljehallen, Södertälje

=== Fifth place match ===
Täljehallen, Södertälje

=== Bronze medal match ===
12 July
17:45

Boxscore

Czech Republic	54–67	Sweden
Scoring by quarter: 7–7, 15–20, 14–19, 18–21
Pts: Hanusová 17; Rebs: Hanusová 8 Asts: Záplatová 3		Pts: Drammeh 19; Rebs: Abdi 15; Asts: Abdi 6

Täljehallen, Södertälje
Referees: Paolo Taurino (ITA), Anna Cardus (ESP), Carole Delauné (FRA)

=== Final ===
12 July
20:00

Boxscore

Spain	64–54	France
Scoring by quarter: 11–12, 16–14, 20–10, 17–18
Pts: Rodriguez 22; Rebs: Gastaminza Ganuza 10; Asts: Rodriguez 3		Pts: Konteh 16; Rebs: Vernerey 13; Asts: Niamke 6

Täljehallen, Södertälje
Referees: Milan Brizak (SVK), Lahdo Sharro (SWE), Oscar Lefwerth (SWE)

== Referees ==
The following referees were selected for the tournament:

- (Slovakia) Milan Brizak
- (Spain) Anna Cardus
- (Belarus) Piotr Ivashkov
- (Italy) Paolo Taurino
- (Lithuania) Martynas Gudas
- (Georgia (country)) Zaza Machaladze
- (New Zealand) Timothy Andrew Frederick Brown
- (France) Carole Delauné
- (Latvia) Oskars Lucis
- (Czech Republic) Robert Vyklicky
- (Ukraine) Borys Shulga
- (Sweden) Oscar Lefwerth

== Final rankings ==
Rank	Team	Record	FIBA World Rankings		
Rank	Team	Record	Before	After	Change
Gold medal game participants
1st place, gold medalist(s)	Spain	9–0	2	2	0
2nd place, silver medalist(s)	France	8–1	3	3	0
Bronze medal game participants
3rd place, bronze medalist(s)	Sweden	6–3	15	27	▼12
4th	Czech Republic	5–4	12	7	▲5
Eliminated at the quarterfinals
5th	Serbia	6–3	14	13	▲1
6th	Lithuania	5–4	28	32	▼4
7th	Latvia	4–5	41	31	▲10
8th	Ukraine	3–6	—	—	—
Ninth-place game participants
9th	Russia	3–5	6	5	▲1
10th	Italy	4–4	13	10	▲3
Eleventh-place match participants
11th	Belgium	4–4	62	67	▼5
12th	Poland	1–7	32	48	▼16
Preliminary round 4th placers
13th	Turkey	3–3	19	20	▼1
14th	Slovakia	2–4	23	25	▼2
15th	Belarus	1–5	62	67	▼5
16th	Bulgaria	0–6	72	70	▲2
