= England women's national under-18 basketball team =

Youth basketball team representing England

England
- FIBA zone: FIBA Europe
- National federation: Basketball England

U19 World Cup
- Appearances: None

U18 EuroBasket
- Appearances: 1
- Medals: None

U18 EuroBasket Division B
- Appearances: 11
- Medals: Silver: 1 (2012)

U18 European Championship Division C
- Appearances: 1
- Medals: Silver: 1 (1997)

The England women's national under-18 basketball team is a national basketball team of England, administered by the Basketball England. It represents the country in women's international under-18 basketball competitions.

The team won a silver medal at the 1997 European Promotion Cup for Junior Women. They participated 11 times at the FIBA U18 Women's European Championship Division B. Their best result was the second place in 2012 which meant a promotion to the 2013 FIBA Europe Under-18 Championship for Women Division A, where they finished in 16th place.

== See also ==
- England women's national basketball team
- England women's national under-16 basketball team
- England men's national under-18 basketball team
