= 2021 FIBA U18 Women's European Challengers =

International basketball tournament

Tournament details
- Dates: 27 July – 1 August 2021
- Teams: 28
- Venue(s): 5 (in 5 host cities)

Official website
- www.fiba.basketball

The 2021 FIBA U18 Women's European Challengers were international basketball competitions which took place from 27 July to 1 August 2021, replacing the cancelled 2021 FIBA U18 Women's European Championship.

== History ==
The 2020 edition of FIBA U18 Women's European Championship was to be held in Heraklion, Greece but was postponed to 2021 due to COVID-19 pandemic. Since the pandemic continued in 2021, the FIBA Europe decided to hold alternative format of competition to replace traditional format of U18 Women's European Championship where 16 or more teams gather in one place.

== Structure ==
- The events are to be played on a voluntary participation basis, with promotion/relegation to be frozen across Divisions A, B and C.
- The Top 18 ranked teams (16 currently in Division A, plus two additional teams by 2019 ranking in respective category) to play three tournaments of six teams each (Groups A, B and C).
- All other registered teams, ranked 19 and lower, to play in tournaments of up to six teams each (Group D).
- One tournament of up to six teams to be created with the lowest-ranked teams to accommodate Division C and Small Countries (Group F).
- All tournaments to be played in Round Robin format, with groups to be created by "serpentine" style allocation, taking the hosting situation into consideration.

== Participating teams ==
Top-18 Challengers

- Croatia
- Czech Republic
- France
- Germany
- Greece
- Hungary
- Ireland
- Israel
- Latvia
- Lithuania
- Poland
- Portugal
- Romania
- Russia
- Serbia
- Slovakia
- Spain
- Turkey

19–24 Challenger

- Albania
- Bulgaria
- North Macedonia
- Slovenia
- Switzerland
- Ukraine

25–28 Challenger

- Andorra
- Cyprus
- Malta
- Moldova

== Top-18 Challengers ==
=== Group A ===
The Group A tournament was played in Riga, Latvia.

Pos	Team	Pld	W	L	PF	PA	PD	Pts
1	Portugal	5	4	1	339	269	+70	9
2	Croatia	5	4	1	368	308	+60	9
3	Latvia	5	4	1	303	274	+29	9
4	Germany	5	2	3	307	311	−4	7
5	Russia	5	1	4	305	311	−6	6
6	Romania	5	0	5	241	390	−149	5

Source: FIBA

27 July 2021

Boxscore

Romania	38–92	Russia

27 July 2021

Boxscore

Croatia	73–58	Latvia

27 July 2021

Boxscore

Germany	53–67	Portugal

28 July 2021

Boxscore

Russia	53–70	Croatia

28 July 2021

Boxscore

Latvia	57–49	Germany

28 July 2021

Boxscore

Portugal	73–49	Romania

29 July 2021

Boxscore

Germany	71–76	Croatia

29 July 2021

Boxscore

Romania	54–67	Latvia

29 July 2021

Boxscore

Portugal	74–50	Russia

31 July 2021

Boxscore

Croatia	88–49	Romania

31 July 2021

Boxscore

Latvia	56–48	Portugal

31 July 2021

Boxscore

Russia	60–64	Germany

1 August 2021

Boxscore

Romania	51–70	Germany

1 August 2021

Boxscore

Latvia	65–50	Russia

1 August 2021

Boxscore

Portugal	77–61	Croatia

=== Group B ===
The Group B tournament was played in Klatovy, Czech Republic.

Pos	Team	Pld	W	L	PF	PA	PD	Pts
1	Serbia	5	5	0	331	233	+98	10
2	Lithuania	5	4	1	357	291	+66	9
3	Czech Republic	5	2	3	277	320	−43	7
4	Turkey	5	2	3	292	288	+4	7
5	Ireland	5	1	4	288	387	−99	6
6	Hungary	5	1	4	296	322	−26	6

Source: FIBA

27 July 2021

Boxscore

Hungary	47–50	Turkey

27 July 2021

Boxscore

Ireland	47–86	Lithuania

27 July 2021

Boxscore

Serbia	65–40	Czech Republic

28 July 2021

Boxscore

Turkey	67–55	Ireland

28 July 2021

Boxscore

Lithuania	52–58	Serbia

28 July 2021

Boxscore

Czech Republic	47–71	Hungary

29 July 2021

Boxscore

Turkey	65–71	Lithuania

29 July 2021

Boxscore

Hungary	43–63	Serbia

29 July 2021

Boxscore

Ireland	52–80	Czech Republic

31 July 2021

Boxscore

Lithuania	75–71	Hungary

31 July 2021

Boxscore

Serbia	90–47	Ireland

31 July 2021

Boxscore

Czech Republic	60–59	Turkey

1 August 2021

Boxscore

Ireland	87–64	Hungary

1 August 2021

Boxscore

Turkey	51–55	Serbia

1 August 2021

Boxscore

Czech Republic	50–73	Lithuania

=== Group C ===
The Group C tournament was played in Heraklion, Greece.

Pos	Team	Pld	W	L	PF	PA	PD	Pts
1	France	5	5	0	380	201	+179	10
2	Spain	5	4	1	318	225	+93	9
3	Poland	5	3	2	275	288	−13	8
4	Greece	5	2	3	178	256	−78	7
5	Israel	5	1	4	225	300	−75	6
6	Slovakia	5	0	5	244	350	−106	5

Source: FIBA

27 July 2021

Boxscore

Israel	42–55	Spain

27 July 2021

Boxscore

Greece	37–61	Poland

27 July 2021

Boxscore

Slovakia	41–72	France

28 July 2021

Boxscore

Poland	69–63	Israel

28 July 2021

Boxscore

France	72–27	Greece

28 July 2021

Boxscore

Spain	82–39	Slovakia

29 July 2021

Boxscore

Israel	44–92	France

29 July 2021

Boxscore

Greece	56–54	Slovakia

29 July 2021

Boxscore

Poland	45–59	Spain

31 July 2021

Boxscore

France	83–36	Poland

31 July 2021

Boxscore

Spain	69–38	Greece

31 July 2021

Boxscore

Slovakia	64–76	Israel

1 August 2021

Boxscore

Israel	0–20	Greece

1 August 2021

Boxscore

France	61–53	Spain

1 August 2021

Boxscore

Poland	64–46	Slovakia

== 19–24 Challenger ==
=== Group D ===
The Group D tournament was played in Sofia, Bulgaria.

Pos	Team	Pld	W	L	PF	PA	PD	Pts
19	Slovenia	5	4	1	359	191	+168	9
20	Bulgaria	5	4	1	330	258	+72	9
21	Ukraine	5	3	2	331	272	+59	8
22	North Macedonia	5	2	3	258	337	−79	7
23	Switzerland	5	2	3	285	302	−17	7
24	Albania	5	0	5	187	390	−203	5

Source: FIBA

27 July 2021

Boxscore

North Macedonia	52–69	Ukraine

27 July 2021

Boxscore

Albania	21–90	Slovenia

27 July 2021

Boxscore

Bulgaria	67–50	Switzerland

28 July 2021

Boxscore

Slovenia	88–22	North Macedonia

28 July 2021

Boxscore

Switzerland	76–47	Albania

28 July 2021

Boxscore

Ukraine	59–70	Bulgaria

29 July 2021

Boxscore

Switzerland	34–65	Slovenia

29 July 2021

Boxscore

Albania	35–85	Ukraine

29 July 2021

Boxscore

Bulgaria	64–55	North Macedonia

31 July 2021

Boxscore

North Macedonia	61–49	Albania

31 July 2021

Boxscore

Ukraine	55–58	Switzerland

31 July 2021

Boxscore

Slovenia	59–51	Bulgaria

1 August 2021

Boxscore

Switzerland	67–68	North Macedonia

1 August 2021

Boxscore

Ukraine	63–57	Slovenia

1 August 2021

Boxscore

Albania	35–78	Bulgaria

== 25–28 Challenger ==
=== Group F ===
The Group F tournament was played in Andorra la Vella, Andorra. After the first round, all four teams advanced to the playoffs.

==== Group phase ====
Pos	Team	Pld	W	L	PF	PA	PD	Pts
1	Cyprus	3	3	0	261	88	+173	6
2	Malta	3	2	1	194	124	+70	5
3	Moldova	3	1	2	129	231	−102	4
4	Andorra	3	0	3	96	237	−141	3

Source: FIBA

27 July 2021

Boxscore

Moldova	37–90	Malta

27 July 2021

Boxscore

Cyprus	95–34	Andorra

28 July 2021

Boxscore

Malta	31–66	Cyprus

28 July 2021

Boxscore

Andorra	41–69	Moldova

29 July 2021

Boxscore

Cyprus	100–23	Moldova

29 July 2021

Boxscore

Malta	73–21	Andorra

==== Playoffs ====
25th–28th place semifinals
F1	Cyprus	100
F4	Andorra	26
F2	Malta	69
F3	Moldova	46

25th place match
F1	Cyprus	60
F2	Malta	45
27th place match
F4	Andorra	41
F3	Moldova	44

Source: FIBA

===== 25th–28th place semifinals =====
31 July 2021

Boxscore

Cyprus	100–26	Andorra

31 July 2021

Boxscore

Malta	69–46	Moldova

===== 27th place match =====
1 August 2021

Boxscore

Andorra	41–44	Moldova

===== 25th place match =====
1 August 2021

Boxscore

Cyprus	60–45	Malta

==== Final standings ====
Rank	Team
25	Cyprus
26	Malta
27	Moldova
28	Andorra

== See also ==
- 2021 FIBA U20 European Challengers
- 2021 FIBA U18 European Challengers
- 2021 FIBA U16 European Challengers
- 2021 FIBA U20 Women's European Challengers
- 2021 FIBA U16 Women's European Challengers
