= 2026 FIBA U18 Women's EuroBasket Division B =

International youth basketball tournament

Tournament details
- Host country: Romania
- City: Tulcea
- Dates: 31 July – 9 August 2026
- Teams: 20 (from 1 confederation)
- Venues: 2 (in 1 host city)

Final positions
- Champions: Israel (1st title)
- Runners-up: Romania
- Third place: Lithuania
- Fourth place: Austria

Tournament statistics
- MVP: (Israel) Maya Zilbershlag
- Top scorer: (Iceland) Rebekka Steingrimsdottir (24.0 points per game)

Official website
- www.fiba.basketball

The 2026 FIBA U18 Women's EuroBasket Division B was the 20th edition of the Division B of the European basketball championship for women's under-18 national teams. The tournament was played in Tulcea, Romania, from 31 July to 9 August 2026.

Israel secured their first Division B title with a victory over Romania in the final, 85–66.

== Participating teams ==
- Austria
- Azerbaijan
- Bosnia and Herzegovina
- Bulgaria
- Denmark
- Estonia
- Great Britain
- Greece ▼ (14th place, 2025 FIBA U18 Women's EuroBasket Division A)
- Iceland
- Israel ▼ (16th place, 2025 FIBA U18 Women's EuroBasket Division A)
- Ireland
- Lithuania
- Luxembourg
- Netherlands
- North Macedonia
- Norway
- Portugal ▼ (15th place, 2025 FIBA U18 Women's EuroBasket Division A)
- Romania
- Slovakia
- Ukraine

== First round ==
The draw of the first round was held on 28 January 2026 in Freising, Germany.

In the first round, the teams were drawn into four groups. The first two teams from each group advanced to the quarterfinals; the third and fourth teams from each group advanced to the 9th–16th place playoffs; the other teams were dropped to the 17th–20st place classification.

All times are local (Eastern European Summer Time; UTC+3).

=== Group A ===
Pos	Team	Pld	W	L	PF	PA	PD	Pts	Qualification
1	Romania (H)	4	4	0	318	239	+79	8	Quarterfinals
2	Iceland	4	3	1	326	306	+20	7	Quarterfinals
3	Portugal	4	2	2	263	250	+13	6	9th–16th place playoffs
4	Netherlands	4	1	3	251	289	−38	5	9th–16th place playoffs
5	Azerbaijan	4	0	4	253	327	−74	4	17th–20st place classification

Source: FIBA
(H) Hosts

31 July 2026
12:30

Boxscore

Portugal	57–45	Netherlands
Scoring by quarter: 12–14, 12–12, 18–7, 15–12

Sala Polivalentă 2
Attendance: 46

31 July 2026
17:30

Boxscore

Romania	81–55	Azerbaijan
Scoring by quarter: 27–15, 15–19, 20–11, 19–10

Sala Polivalentă 1
Attendance: 4,341

1 August 2026
15:00

Boxscore

Azerbaijan	52–90	Portugal
Scoring by quarter: 22–21, 12–20, 11–27, 7–22

Sala Polivalentă 2
Attendance: 25

1 August 2026
17:30

Boxscore

Iceland	73–100	Romania
Scoring by quarter: 14–27, 26–22, 17–29, 16–22

Sala Polivalentă 1
Attendance: 4,042

2 August 2026
12:30

Boxscore

Netherlands	79–72	Azerbaijan
Scoring by quarter: 13–23, 21–12, 20–13, 25–24

Sala Polivalentă 1
Attendance: 40

2 August 2026
12:30

Boxscore

Portugal	70–91	Iceland
Scoring by quarter: 13–28, 18–22, 14–19, 25–22

Sala Polivalentă 1
Attendance: 284

4 August 2026
12:30

Boxscore

Iceland	85–62	Netherlands
Scoring by quarter: 14–11, 27–13, 24–20, 20–18

Sala Polivalentă 1
Attendance: 100

4 August 2026
17:30

Boxscore

Romania	62–46	Portugal
Scoring by quarter: 11–15, 19–13, 12–10, 20–8

Sala Polivalentă 1
Attendance: 4,670

5 August 2026
15:00

Boxscore

Azerbaijan	74–77	Iceland
Scoring by quarter: 24–17, 21–23, 15–11, 14–26

Sala Polivalentă 2
Attendance: 35

5 August 2026
17:30

Boxscore

Netherlands	65–75	Romania
Scoring by quarter: 16–23, 14–15, 12–19, 23–18

Sala Polivalentă 1
Attendance: 4,670

=== Group B ===
Pos	Team	Pld	W	L	PF	PA	PD	Pts	Qualification
1	Israel	4	4	0	326	217	+109	8	Quarterfinals
2	Bulgaria	4	3	1	304	245	+59	7	Quarterfinals
3	Switzerland	4	2	2	278	231	+47	6	9th–16th place playoffs
4	Ukraine	4	1	3	243	303	−60	5	9th–16th place playoffs
5	Norway	4	0	4	159	314	−155	4	17th–20st place classification

Source: FIBA

31 July 2026
15:00

Boxscore

Israel	72–66	Switzerland
Scoring by quarter: 15–22, 22–10, 21–22, 14–12

Sala Polivalentă 1
Attendance: 1,050

31 July 2026
20:00

Boxscore

Ukraine	64–59	Norway
Scoring by quarter: 10–15, 23–17, 13–9, 18–18

Sala Polivalentă 2
Attendance: 34

1 August 2026
15:00

Boxscore

Bulgaria	91–68	Ukraine
Scoring by quarter: 31–19, 20–18, 24–13, 16–18

Sala Polivalentă 1
Attendance: 432

1 August 2026
17:30

Boxscore

Norway	25–84	Israel
Scoring by quarter: 7–17, 10–34, 7–16, 1–17

Sala Polivalentă 2
Attendance: 42

2 August 2026
15:00

Boxscore

Israel	90–67	Bulgaria
Scoring by quarter: 22–15, 25–21, 27–14, 16–17

Sala Polivalentă 2
Attendance: 50

2 August 2026
17:30

Boxscore

Switzerland	90–37	Norway
Scoring by quarter: 18–10, 29–9, 22–5, 21–13

Sala Polivalentă 1
Attendance: 1,007

4 August 2026
12:30

Boxscore

Ukraine	59–80	Israel
Scoring by quarter: 18–18, 12–14, 18–17, 11–31

Sala Polivalentă 2
Attendance: 40

4 August 2026
15:00

Boxscore

Bulgaria	70–49	Switzerland
Scoring by quarter: 25–11, 13–14, 18–14, 14–10

Sala Polivalentă 2
Attendance: 34

5 August 2026
12:30

Boxscore

Switzerland	73–52	Ukraine
Scoring by quarter: 18–14, 16–9, 17–13, 22–16

Sala Polivalentă 2
Attendance: 35

5 August 2026
17:30

Boxscore

Norway	38–76	Bulgaria
Scoring by quarter: 14–21, 7–17, 4–21, 13–17

Sala Polivalentă 2
Attendance: 20

=== Group C ===
Pos	Team	Pld	W	L	PF	PA	PD	Pts	Qualification
1	Austria	4	3	1	251	214	+37	7	Quarterfinals
2	Lithuania	4	3	1	228	204	+24	7	Quarterfinals
3	Ireland	4	3	1	261	224	+37	7	9th–16th place playoffs
4	Luxembourg	4	1	3	232	270	−38	5	9th–16th place playoffs
5	Estonia	4	0	4	246	306	−60	4	17th–20st place classification

Source: FIBA

31 July 2026
12:30

Boxscore

Lithuania	58–47	Ireland
Scoring by quarter: 14–15, 14–5, 19–10, 11–17

Sala Polivalentă 1
Attendance: 284

31 July 2026
15:00

Boxscore

Austria	77–57	Estonia
Scoring by quarter: 21–15, 23–16, 15–11, 18–15

Sala Polivalentă 2
Attendance: 56

1 August 2026
12:30

Boxscore

Luxembourg	52–60	Austria
Scoring by quarter: 15–14, 18–14, 13–19, 6–13

Sala Polivalentă 1
Attendance: 97

1 August 2026
12:30

Boxscore

Estonia	55–60	Lithuania
Scoring by quarter: 10–14, 12–25, 15–6, 18–15

Sala Polivalentă 2
Attendance: 35

2 August 2026
15:00

Boxscore

Ireland	88–55	Estonia
Scoring by quarter: 29–18, 10–19, 24–12, 25–6

Sala Polivalentă 1
Attendance: 185

2 August 2026
21:00

Boxscore

Lithuania	66–48	Luxembourg
Scoring by quarter: 12–8, 18–23, 23–0, 13–17

Sala Polivalentă 1
Attendance: 278

4 August 2026
15:00

Boxscore

Austria	54–44	Lithuania
Scoring by quarter: 10–6, 15–12, 17–20, 12–6

Sala Polivalentă 1
Attendance: 90

4 August 2026
18:30

Boxscore

Luxembourg	51–65	Ireland
Scoring by quarter: 12–6, 17–20, 10–22, 12–17

Sala Polivalentă 2
Attendance: 75

5 August 2026
12:30

Boxscore

Estonia	79–81	Luxembourg
Scoring by quarter: 26–15, 20–28, 18–28, 15–10

Sala Polivalentă 1
Attendance: 55

5 August 2026
21:00

Boxscore

Ireland	61–60	Austria
Scoring by quarter: 16–18, 16–14, 15–16, 14–12

Sala Polivalentă 1
Attendance: 102

=== Group D ===
Pos	Team	Pld	W	L	PF	PA	PD	Pts	Qualification
1	Greece	4	4	0	291	225	+66	8	Quarterfinals
2	Great Britain	4	3	1	249	227	+22	7	Quarterfinals
3	Slovakia	4	2	2	270	265	+5	6	9th–16th place playoffs
4	Denmark	4	1	3	256	274	−18	5	9th–16th place playoffs
5	North Macedonia	4	0	4	210	285	−75	4	17th–20st place classification

Source: FIBA

31 July 2026
17:30

Boxscore

Denmark	73–60	North Macedonia
Scoring by quarter: 17–14, 21–12, 16–16, 19–18

Sala Polivalentă 2
Attendance: 20

31 July 2026
20:00

Boxscore

Greece	68–63	Great Britain
Scoring by quarter: 20–12, 15–22, 9–20, 24–9

Sala Polivalentă 1
Attendance: 153

1 August 2026
20:00

Boxscore

Slovakia	74–63	Denmark
Scoring by quarter: 6–21, 25–8, 19–14, 24–20

Sala Polivalentă 1
Attendance: 387

1 August 2026
20:00

Boxscore

North Macedonia	42–73	Greece
Scoring by quarter: 13–19, 7–21, 11–11, 11–22

Sala Polivalentă 2
Attendance: 43

2 August 2026
17:30

Boxscore

Greece	78–60	Slovakia
Scoring by quarter: 21–15, 22–13, 21–15, 14–17

Sala Polivalentă 2
Attendance: 50

2 August 2026
20:00

Boxscore

Great Britain	59–43	North Macedonia
Scoring by quarter: 21–4, 10–11, 6–10, 22–18

Sala Polivalentă 2
Attendance: 40

4 August 2026
20:00

Boxscore

Denmark	60–72	Greece
Scoring by quarter: 22–17, 16–13, 12–19, 10–23

Sala Polivalentă 1
Attendance: 349

4 August 2026
20:00

Boxscore

Slovakia	56–59	Great Britain
Scoring by quarter: 14–14, 10–4, 12–19, 20–22

Sala Polivalentă 2
Attendance: 52

5 August 2026
15:00

Boxscore

North Macedonia	65–80	Slovakia
Scoring by quarter: 22–21, 22–22, 10–19, 11–18

Sala Polivalentă 1
Attendance: 1,202

5 August 2026
20:00

Boxscore

Great Britain	68–60	Denmark
Scoring by quarter: 24–13, 12–16, 14–20, 18–11

Sala Polivalentă 2
Attendance: 30

== 17th–20th place classification ==
=== Group E ===
Pos	Team	Pld	W	L	PF	PA	PD	Pts
17	Azerbaijan	3	3	0	226	192	+34	6
18	North Macedonia	3	1	2	204	192	+12	4
19	Norway	3	1	2	167	198	−31	4
20	Estonia	3	1	2	201	216	−15	4

Source: FIBA

7 August 2026
11:00

Boxscore

Azerbaijan	75–73	North Macedonia
Scoring by quarter: 19–24, 21–18, 17–13, 18–18

Sala Polivalentă 1
Attendance: 20

7 August 2026
11:00

Boxscore

Norway	78–54	Estonia
Scoring by quarter: 10–14, 19–13, 25–12, 24–15

Sala Polivalentă 2
Attendance: 15

8 August 2026
11:00

Boxscore

Estonia	71–74	Azerbaijan
Scoring by quarter: 13–27, 27–13, 20–18, 11–16

Sala Polivalentă 1
Attendance: 89

8 August 2026
11:00

Boxscore

North Macedonia	67–41	Norway
Scoring by quarter: 26–6, 14–5, 21–17, 6–13

Sala Polivalentă 2
Attendance: 20

9 August 2026
10:00

Boxscore

Estonia	76–64	North Macedonia
Scoring by quarter: 21–13, 19–22, 18–8, 18–21

Sala Polivalentă 2

9 August 2026
11:00

Boxscore

Azerbaijan	74–48	Norway
Scoring by quarter: 17–17, 12–14, 27–5, 21–12

Sala Polivalentă 1

== 9th–16th place playoffs ==
13th place match
B4	Ukraine	62
C3	Ireland	77
15th place match
C4	Luxembourg	62
B3	Switzerland	51

13th–16th place semifinals
B4	Ukraine	70
C4	Luxembourg	42
B3	Switzerland	47
C3	Ireland	79

9th–16th place quarterfinals
A3	Portugal	66
B4	Ukraine	46
D3	Slovakia	69
C4	Luxembourg	50
B3	Switzerland	46
A4	Netherlands	47
C3	Ireland	61
D4	Denmark	68

9th–12th place semifinals
A3	Portugal	62
D3	Slovakia	55
A4	Netherlands	68
D4	Denmark	71

9th place match
A3	Portugal	76
D4	Denmark	55
11th place match
D3	Slovakia	56
A4	Netherlands	57

=== 9th–16th place quarterfinals ===
7 August 2026
13:30

Boxscore

Portugal	66–46	Ukraine
Scoring by quarter: 16-13, 15-7, 22-20, 13-6

Sala Polivalentă 2
Attendance: 32

7 August 2026
16:00

Boxscore

Slovakia	63–50	Luxembourg
Scoring by quarter: 23-12, 20-9, 16-17, 10-12

Sala Polivalentă 2
Attendance: 40

7 August 2026
18:30

Boxscore

Switzerland	46–47	Netherlands
Scoring by quarter: 15-23, 8-14, 15-4, 9-6

Sala Polivalentă 2
Attendance: 40

7 August 2026
21:00

Boxscore

Ireland	61–68	Denmark
Scoring by quarter: 21-19, 14-17, 16-19, 10-13

Sala Polivalentă 2
Attendance: 45

=== 13th–16th place semifinals ===
8 August 2026
13:30

Boxscore

Ukraine	70–42	Luxembourg
Scoring by quarter: 23-12, 17-11, 18-14, 12-8

Sala Polivalentă 2
Attendance: 20

8 August 2026
16:00

Boxscore

Switzerland	47–79	Ireland
Scoring by quarter: 17-9, 8-24, 11-18, 11-28

Sala Polivalentă 2
Attendance: 52

=== 15th place match ===
9 August 2026
12:30

Boxscore

Luxembourg	62–51	Switzerland
Scoring by quarter: 10–17, 22–13, 14–6, 16–15

Sala Polivalentă 2

=== 13th place match ===
9 August 2026
15:00

Boxscore

Ukraine	62–77	Ireland
Scoring by quarter: 13-17, 17-19, 17-18, 15-23

Sala Polivalentă 2

=== 9th–12th place semifinals ===
8 August 2026
18:30

Boxscore

Portugal	62–55	Slovakia
Scoring by quarter: 18-17, 23-9, 12-9, 9-20

Sala Polivalentă 2
Attendance: 37

8 August 2026
21:00

Boxscore

Netherlands	68–71	Denmark
Scoring by quarter: 11-22, 18-14, 18-21, 21-14

Sala Polivalentă 2
Attendance: 48

=== 11th place match ===
9 August 2026
17:30

Boxscore

Slovakia	56–57	Netherlands
Scoring by quarter: 11-5, 13-21, 16-11, 16-20

Sala Polivalentă 2

=== 9th place match ===
9 August 2026
20:00

Boxscore

Portugal	76–55	Denmark
Scoring by quarter: 20-19, 21-14, 15-11, 20-11

Sala Polivalentă 2

== Championship playoffs ==
5th place match
D1	Greece	77
A2	Iceland	78
7th place match
B2	Bulgaria	75
D2	Great Britain	86

5th–8th place semifinals
B2	Bulgaria	65
D1	Greece	67
A2	Iceland	102
D2	Great Britain	77

Quarterfinals
A1	Romania	69
B2	Bulgaria	51
D1	Greece	66
C2	Lithuania	74
B1	Israel	89
A2	Iceland	69
C1	Austria	61
D2	Great Britain	49

Semifinals
A1	Romania	78
C2	Lithuania	48
B1	Israel	78
C1	Austria	63

Final
A1	Romania	66
B1	Israel	85
3rd place match
C2	Lithuania	71
C1	Austria	64

=== Quarterfinals ===
7 August 2026
13:30

Boxscore

Israel	89–69	Iceland
Scoring by quarter: 27-21, 23-16, 21-17, 18-15

Sala Polivalentă 1
Attendance: 100

7 August 2026
16:00

Boxscore

Austria	61–49	Great Britain
Scoring by quarter: 11-12, 20-11, 16-16, 14-10

Sala Polivalentă 1
Attendance: 2563

7 August 2026
18:30

Boxscore

Romania	69–51	Bulgaria
Scoring by quarter: 11-13, 26-13, 14-13, 18-12

Sala Polivalentă 1
Attendance: 2670

7 August 2026
21:00

Boxscore

Greece	66–74	Lithuania
Scoring by quarter: 22-16, 11-13, 12-21, 4-12

Sala Polivalentă 1
Attendance: 178

=== 5th–8th place semifinals ===
8 August 2026
13:30

Boxscore

Iceland	102–77	Great Britain
Scoring by quarter: 28-21, 22-24, 29-10, 23-22

Sala Polivalentă 1
Attendance: 52

8 August 2026
16:00

Boxscore

Bulgaria	65–67	Greece
Scoring by quarter: 17-24, 20-11, 16-16, 12-16

Sala Polivalentă 1
Attendance: 2254

=== 7th place match ===
9 August 2026
13:30

Boxscore

Bulgaria	75–86	Great Britain
Scoring by quarter: 21–12, 13–19, 22–26, 19–29

Sala Polivalentă 1

=== 5th place match ===
9 August 2026
16:00

Boxscore

Greece	77–78	Iceland
Scoring by quarter: 17-21, 25-20, 17-26, 18-11

Sala Polivalentă 1

=== Semifinals ===
8 August 2026
18:30

Boxscore

Romania	78–48	Lithuania
Scoring by quarter: 26-21, 15-7, 24-4, 13-16

Sala Polivalentă 1
Attendance: 4670

8 August 2026
21:00

Boxscore

Israel	78–63	Austria
Scoring by quarter: 17-14, 19-19, 24-18, 18-12

Sala Polivalentă 1
Attendance: 200

=== 3rd place match ===
9 August 2026
18:30

Boxscore

Lithuania	71–64	Austria
Scoring by quarter: 19-11, 20-18, 17-19, 15-16

Sala Polivalentă 1

=== Final ===
9 August 2026
21:00

Boxscore

Romania	66–85	Israel
Scoring by quarter: 14-30, 15-21, 15-25, 22-9

Sala Polivalentă 1
Attendance: 4700

== Final standings ==
Rank	Team	Record
1st place, gold medalist(s)	Israel	7–0
2nd place, silver medalist(s)	Romania	6–1
3rd place, bronze medalist(s)	Lithuania	5–2
4	Austria	4–3
5	Iceland	5–2
6	Greece	4–3
7	Great Britain	4–3
8	Bulgaria	3–4
9	Portugal	5–2
10	Denmark	3–4
11	Netherlands	3–4
12	Slovakia	3–4
13	Ireland	5–2
14	Ukraine	2–5
15	Luxembourg	2–5
16	Switzerland	2–5
17	Azerbaijan	3–4
18	North Macedonia	1–6
19	Norway	1–6
20	Estonia	1–6

Promoted to the 2027 FIBA U18 Women's EuroBasket Division A

== Statistics and awards ==
=== Statistical leaders ===
==== Players ====
Points

Name	PPG
(Iceland) Rebekka Steingrimsdottir	24.0
(Portugal) Mafalda Monteiro	21.6
(Estonia) Laura Grunmann	21.1
(Romania) Daria Ilies	19.4
(Denmark) Caroline Reumert	19.3

Rebounds

Name	RPG
(Azerbaijan) Polina Shchukina	14.7
(Lithuania) Gabija Galvanauskaite	14.6
(United Kingdom) Bella Rogers	12.3
(Austria) Sophia Kuranovic	11.9
(Denmark) Elisa Gurkan-Douglas	11.6

Assists

Name	APG
(Israel) Rotem Sticlaru	7.1
(Romania) Ioana-Vanessa Velcea	5.1
(Lithuania) Vakare Griskute	4.7
(Portugal) Ana Alves	4.6
(Republic of Ireland) Aoibheann Donnelly	4.4

Blocks

Name	BLKPG
(Republic of Ireland) Madelyn Hartigan	2.4
(Romania) Crina-Raluca Teglas	2.3
(Switzerland) Evi Bartel	2.1
(Republic of Ireland) Francesca Kyamagero	2.0
(Slovakia) Romana Kacmarcikova	2.0

Steals

Name	STLPG
(Switzerland) Scya Srdanovic	5.6
(Iceland) Rebekka Steingrimsdottir	5.0
(Romania) Ioana-Vanessa Velcea	4.7
(Romania) Crina-Raluca Teglas	4.0
(Republic of Ireland) Aoibheann Donnelly	3.7
(Estonia) Laura Grunmann	3.7

Efficiency

Name	EFFPG
(Azerbaijan) Polina Shchukina	25.4
(Romania) Daria Ilies	20.3
(Denmark) Elisa Gurkan-Douglas	18.7
(United Kingdom) Bella Rogers	18.6
(Portugal) Mafalda Monteiro	18.4
(Lithuania) Gabija Galvanauskaite	18.4

==== Teams ====
Points

Team	PPG
Israel	82.6
Iceland	82.1
Romania	75.9
Greece	71.6
Bulgaria	70.7

Rebounds

Team	RPG
Lithuania	54.6
Great Britain	54.4
Denmark	52.0
Austria	50.6
Netherlands	49.7

Assists

Team	APG
Romania	19.3
Israel	17.9
Iceland	16.7
Ireland	16.1
Bulgaria	15.9

Blocks

Team	BLKPG
Ireland	6.4
Great Britain	6.0
Romania	5.6
Slovakia	4.1
Austria	3.7

Steals

Team	STLPG
Iceland	18.4
Romania	17.4
Ireland	17.3
Switzerland	17.1
Greece	16.9

Efficiency

Team	EFFPG
Israel	90.7
Romania	90.0
Ireland	79.0
Bulgaria	75.7
Iceland	74.6

=== Awards ===
The awards were announced on 9 August 2026.

Award	Player
All-Tournament Team	(Israel) Maya Zilbershlag
All-Tournament Team	(Israel) Mayaan Gorin
All-Tournament Team	(Romania) Ioana-Vanessa Velcea
All-Tournament Team	(Romania) Daria Ilies
All-Tournament Team	(Lithuania) Gabija Galvanauskaite
Most Valuable Player	(Israel) Maya Zilbershlag
