= 2022 FIBA U18 Women's European Championship =

Tournament details
- Host country: Greece
- City: Heraklion
- Dates: 6–14 August 2022
- Teams: 16 (from 1 confederation)
- Venue(s): Heraklion Indoor Sports Arena, Heraklion University Sports Hall

Final positions
- Champions: Lithuania (2nd title)
- Runners-up: Spain
- Third place: France
- Fourth place: Germany

Tournament statistics
- MVP: (Lithuania) Justė Jocytė
- Top scorer: (Lithuania) Justė Jocytė (19.1 ppg)

Official website
- www.fiba.basketball

The 2022 FIBA U18 Women's European Championship was the 37th edition of the Women's European basketball championship for national under-18 teams. It was played from 6 to 14 August 2022 in Heraklion, Greece. Lithuania women's national under-18 basketball team won the tournament and became the European champions for the second time.

== Venues ==
Heraklion
Heraklion Indoor Sports Arena	Heraklion University Sports Hall
Heraklion Indoor Sports Arena interior	Heraklion University Hall
Capacity: 5,222	Capacity: 1,080

== Participating teams ==
After the 2022 Russian invasion of Ukraine, both Russia and Belarus were expelled from the competition. They were replaced by Bosnia and Herzegovina, 14th in the 2019 Division A tournament and Sweden, 4th in the 2019 Division B tournament.

- ~~Belarus~~
- Belgium
- Bosnia and Herzegovina
- Czech Republic
- Finland ▲ (Winners, 2019 FIBA U18 Women's European Championship Division B)
- France
- Germany
- Greece ▲ (Runners-up, 2019 FIBA U18 Women's European Championship Division B)
- Hungary
- Israel
- Italy
- Latvia
- Lithuania
- Poland
- ~~Russia~~
- Spain
- Sweden ▲ (Fourth place, 2019 FIBA U18 Women's European Championship Division B)
- Turkey ▲ (Third place, 2019 FIBA U18 Women's European Championship Division B)

== First round ==
The draw of the first round was held on 15 February 2022 in Freising, Germany.

In the first round, the teams were drawn into four groups of four. All teams advance to the playoffs.

=== Group A ===
Pos	Team	Pld	W	L	PF	PA	PD	Pts
1	Spain	3	3	0	193	148	+45	6
2	Turkey	3	2	1	155	160	−5	5
3	Italy	3	1	2	207	201	+6	4
4	Poland	3	0	3	147	193	−46	3

Source: FIBA

6 August

Boxscore

Italy	71–72	Spain

6 August

Boxscore

Turkey	52–44	Poland

7 August

Boxscore

Poland	66–76	Italy

7 August

Boxscore

Spain	56–40	Turkey

8 August

Boxscore

Spain	65–37	Poland

8 August

Boxscore

Turkey	63–60	Italy

=== Group B ===
Pos	Team	Pld	W	L	PF	PA	PD	Pts
1	Greece (H)	3	2	1	181	191	−10	5
2	Latvia	3	2	1	199	192	+7	5
3	Czech Republic	3	1	2	192	198	−6	4
4	Belgium	3	1	2	173	164	+9	4

Source: FIBA
(H) Hosts

6 August

Boxscore

Greece	75–64	Latvia

6 August

Boxscore

Belgium	58–63	Czech Republic

7 August

Boxscore

Czech Republic	67–71	Greece

7 August

Boxscore

Latvia	66–55	Belgium

8 August

Boxscore

Greece	35–60	Belgium

8 August

Boxscore

Czech Republic	62–69	Latvia

=== Group C ===
Pos	Team	Pld	W	L	PF	PA	PD	Pts
1	Lithuania	3	2	1	202	162	+40	5
2	Finland	3	2	1	216	195	+21	5
3	Hungary	3	2	1	212	209	+3	5
4	Sweden	3	0	3	158	222	−64	3

Source: FIBA

6 August

Boxscore

Finland	70–61	Lithuania

6 August

Boxscore

Sweden	67–77	Hungary

7 August

Boxscore

Lithuania	69–36	Sweden

7 August

Boxscore

Hungary	79–70	Finland

8 August

Boxscore

Finland	76–55	Sweden

8 August

Boxscore

Hungary	56–72	Lithuania

=== Group D ===
Pos	Team	Pld	W	L	PF	PA	PD	Pts
1	France	3	3	0	238	110	+128	6
2	Germany	3	2	1	202	153	+49	5
3	Israel	3	1	2	185	207	−22	4
4	Bosnia and Herzegovina	3	0	3	118	273	−155	3

Source: FIBA

6 August

Boxscore

Israel	87–54	Bosnia and Herzegovina

6 August

Boxscore

Germany	42–59	France

7 August

Boxscore

Bosnia and Herzegovina	36–76	Germany

7 August

Boxscore

France	69–40	Israel

8 August

Boxscore

France	110–28	Bosnia and Herzegovina

8 August

Boxscore

Israel	58–84	Germany

== Playoff brackets ==
=== Main bracket ===
Round of 16
10 August
A1 Spain	50
B4 Belgium	43
10 August
C2 Finland	71
D3 Israel	61
10 August
B2 Latvia	64
A3 Italy	74
10 August
D1 France	94
C4 Sweden	57
10 August
A2 Turkey	53
B3 Czech Republic	83
10 August
C1 Lithuania	84
D4 Bosnia and Herzegovina	40
10 August
B1 Greece	46
A4 Poland	69
10 August
D2 Germany	56
C3 Hungary	55

Quarterfinals
11 August
Spain	63
Finland	52
11 August
Italy	48
France	71
11 August
Czech Republic	81
Lithuania	87
11 August
Poland	43
Germany	53

Semifinals
13 August
Spain	54
France	36
13 August
Lithuania	64
Germany	52

Final
14 August
Spain	75
Lithuania	78
3rd place match
14 August
France	75
Germany	46

=== 5th place bracket ===
5th–8th place semifinals
13 August
Finland	61
Italy	75
13 August
Czech Republic	82
Poland	57

5th place match
14 August
Italy	86
Czech Republic	79
7th place match
14 August
Finland	71
Poland	57

=== 9th place bracket ===
9th–16th place quarterfinals
11 August
Belgium	62
Israel	58
11 August
Latvia	91
Sweden	53
11 August
Turkey	80
Bosnia and Herzegovina	35
11 August
Greece	45
Hungary	57

9th–12th place semifinals
13 August
Belgium	67
Latvia	69
13 August
Turkey	59
Hungary	52

9th place match
14 August
Latvia	69
Turkey	35
11th place match
14 August
Belgium	56
Hungary	63

=== 13th place bracket ===
13th–16th place semifinals
13 August
Israel	78
Sweden	71
13 August
Bosnia and Herzegovina	39
Greece	50

13th place match
14 August
Israel	72
Greece	55
15th place match
14 August
Sweden	94
Bosnia and Herzegovina	42

== Playoff results ==
=== Round of 16 ===
10 August 2022
14:30

Boxscore

Spain	50–43	Belgium

Heraklion Indoor Sports Arena

10 August 2022
14:30

Boxscore

France	94–57	Sweden

Heraklion University Sports Hall

10 August 2022
16:45

Boxscore

Latvia	64–74	Italy

Heraklion University Sports Hall

10 August 2022
16:45

Boxscore

Finland	71–61	Israel

Heraklion Indoor Sports Arena

10 August 2022
19:00

Boxscore

Turkey	53–83	Czech Republic

Heraklion University Sports Hall

10 August 2022
19:00

Boxscore

Greece	46–69	Poland

Heraklion Indoor Sports Arena

10 August 2022
21:15

Boxscore

Lithuania	84–40	Bosnia and Herzegovina

Heraklion University Sports Hall

10 August 2022
21:15

Boxscore

Germany	56–55	Hungary

Heraklion Indoor Sports Arena

=== 9th–16th place quarterfinals ===
11 August 2022
14:30

Boxscore

Belgium	62–58	Israel

Heraklion University Sports Hall

11 August 2022
16:45

Boxscore

Latvia	91–53	Sweden

Heraklion University Sports Hall

11 August 2022
19:00

Boxscore

Greece	45–57	Hungary

Heraklion University Sports Hall

11 August 2022
21:15

Boxscore

Turkey	80–35	Bosnia and Herzegovina

Heraklion University Sports Hall

=== 13th–16th place semifinals ===
13 August 2022
16:45

Boxscore

Israel	78–71	Sweden

Heraklion University Sports Hall

13 August 2022
19:00

Boxscore

Bosnia and Herzegovina	39–50	Greece

Heraklion University Sports Hall

=== 15th place match ===
14 August 2022
12:00

Boxscore

Sweden	94–42	Bosnia and Herzegovina

Heraklion University Sports Hall

=== 13th place match ===
14 August 2022
14:30

Boxscore

Israel	72–55	Greece

Heraklion Indoor Sports Arena

=== 9th–12th place semifinals ===
13 August 2022
14:30

Boxscore

Belgium	67–69	Latvia

Heraklion University Sports Hall

13 August 2022
21:15

Boxscore

Turkey	59–52	Hungary

Heraklion University Sports Hall

=== 11th place match ===
14 August 2022
14:15

Boxscore

Belgium	56–63	Hungary

Heraklion University Sports Hall

=== 9th place match ===
14 August 2022
16:30

Boxscore

Latvia	69–35	Turkey

Heraklion University Sports Hall

=== Championship quarterfinals ===
11 August 2022
14:30

Boxscore

Spain	63–52	Finland

Heraklion Indoor Sports Arena

11 August 2022
16:45

Boxscore

Italy	48–71	France

Heraklion Indoor Sports Arena

11 August 2022
19:00

Boxscore

Poland	43–53	Germany

Heraklion Indoor Sports Arena

11 August 2022
21:15

Boxscore

Czech Republic	81–87	Lithuania

Heraklion Indoor Sports Arena

=== 5th–8th place semifinals ===
13 August 2022
14:30

Boxscore

Finland	61–75	Italy

Heraklion Indoor Sports Arena

13 August 2022
16:45

Boxscore

Czech Republic	82–57	Poland

Heraklion Indoor Sports Arena

=== 7th place match ===
14 August 2022
18:45

Boxscore

Finland	71–57	Poland

Heraklion University Sports Hall

=== 5th place match ===
14 August 2022
16:45

Boxscore

Italy	86–79	Czech Republic

Heraklion Indoor Sports Arena

=== Championship semifinals ===
13 August 2022
19:00

Boxscore

Spain	54–36	France

Heraklion Indoor Sports Arena

13 August 2022
21:15

Boxscore

Lithuania	64–52	Germany

Heraklion Indoor Sports Arena

=== 3rd place match ===
14 August 2022
19:00

Boxscore

France	75–46	Germany

Heraklion Indoor Sports Arena

=== Final ===
14 August 2022
21:15

Boxscore

Spain	75–78	Lithuania

Heraklion Indoor Sports Arena

== Final standings ==
Rank	Team	Record
1st place, gold medalist(s)	Lithuania	6–1
2nd place, silver medalist(s)	Spain	6–1
3rd place, bronze medalist(s)	France	6–1
4	Germany	4–3
5	Italy	4–3
6	Czech Republic	3–4
7	Finland	4–3
8	Poland	1–6
9	Latvia	5–2
10	Turkey	4–3
11	Hungary	4–3
12	Belgium	2–5
13	Israel	3–4
14	Greece	3–4
15	Sweden	1–6
16	Bosnia and Herzegovina	0–7

Qualified for the 2023 FIBA Under-19 Women's Basketball World Cup
Qualified as the host nation for the 2023 FIBA Under-19 Women's Basketball World Cup
Relegated to the 2023 FIBA U18 Women's European Championship Division B
