= Israel women's national under-18 basketball team =

Youth national basketball team

Israel
- FIBA zone: FIBA Europe
- National federation: Israel Basketball Association

U19 World Cup
- Appearances: 1
- Medals: None

U18 EuroBasket
- Appearances: 15
- Medals: None

U18 EuroBasket Division B
- Appearances: 13
- Medals: (gold) Gold: 1 (2026); (bronze) Bronze: 2 (2014, 2018)

The Israel women's national under-18 and under-19 basketball team is a national basketball team of Israel, administered by the Israel Basketball Association. It represents the country in under-18 and under-19 women's international basketball competitions.

== Results ==
=== FIBA Under-19 Women's Basketball World Cup ===
Year	Pos.	GP	W	L	Ref.
(Czech Republic) 2025	10th	6	2	4	

=== FIBA U18 Women's EuroBasket ===
Division A						Division B					
Year	Pos.	GP	W	L	Ref.	Year	Pos.	GP	W	L	Ref.
(Bulgaria) 1965	Did not qualify					Not held					
(Italy) 1967	10th	7	3	4		Not held					
(France) 1969	8th	7	4	3		Not held					
(Socialist Federal Republic of Yugoslavia) 1971	8th	7	2	5		Not held					
(Italy) 1973	9th	7	3	4		Not held					
(Spain) 1975	9th	7	3	4		Not held					
(Bulgaria) 1977	12th	7	2	5		Not held					
1979–1986	Did not qualify					Not held					
(Bulgaria) 1988	10th	7	1	6		Not held					
1990–2002	Did not qualify					Not held					
(Slovakia) 2004	9th	7	3	4		Not held					
(Hungary) 2005	Did not qualify					(Bosnia and Herzegovina) 2005	10th	8	5	3	
(Spain) 2006	Did not qualify					(Italy) 2006	7th	7	2	5	
(Serbia) 2007	Did not qualify					(Romania) 2007	6th	8	3	5	
(Slovakia) 2008	Did not qualify					(North Macedonia) 2008	12th	8	3	5	
(Sweden) 2009	Did not qualify					(Israel) 2009	4th	9	6	3	
(Slovakia) 2010	Did not qualify					(Romania) 2010	12th	7	3	4	
(Romania) 2011	Did not qualify					(Hungary) 2011	8th	9	4	5	
(Romania) 2012	Did not qualify					(North Macedonia) 2012	13th	7	4	3	
(Croatia) 2013	Did not qualify					(Hungary) 2013	14th	7	2	5	
(Portugal) 2014	Did not qualify					(Romania) 2014	3rd place, bronze medalist(s)	8	6	2	
(Slovenia) 2015	12th	9	2	7							
(Hungary) 2016	14th	7	1	6							
(Hungary) 2017	Did not qualify					(Republic of Ireland) 2017	7th	8	5	3	
(Italy) 2018	Did not qualify					(Austria) 2018	3rd place, bronze medalist(s)	8	6	2	
(Bosnia and Herzegovina) 2019	11th	7	2	5							
(Greece) 2022	13th	7	3	4							
(Turkey) 2023	12th	7	1	6							
(Portugal) 2024	4th	7	3	4							
(Spain) 2025	16th	7	0	7							
(Sweden) 2026	Did not qualify					(Romania) 2026	1st place, gold medalist(s)	7	7	0	

== See also ==
- Israel women's national basketball team
- Israel women's national under-17 basketball team
- Israel men's national under-19 basketball team
