= 2006 FIBA Europe Under-18 Championship for Women Division B =

Tournament details
- Host country: Italy
- City: Chieti
- Dates: 21–30 July 2006
- Teams: 14 (from 1 confederation)

Final positions
- Champions: Italy (1st title)
- Runners-up: Ukraine
- Third place: Croatia

Official website
- www.fibaeurope.com

The 2006 FIBA U18 Women's European Championship Division B was the second edition of the Division B of the FIBA U18 Women's European Championship, the second tier of the European women's under-18 basketball championship. It was played in Chieti, Italy, from 21 to 30 July 2006. Italy women's national under-18 basketball team won the tournament.

== Participating teams ==
- Bosnia and Herzegovina
- Croatia ▼ (15th place, 2005 FIBA Europe Under-18 Championship for Women Division A)
- England
- Estonia
- Finland
- Iceland
- Ireland
- Israel
- Italy ▼ (16th place, 2005 FIBA Europe Under-18 Championship for Women Division A)
- Latvia
- Macedonia
- Portugal
- Romania
- Ukraine

== First round ==
In the first round, the teams were drawn into four groups. The first two teams from each group advance to the Quarterfinal round (Groups E and F); the other teams will play in the Classification round (Group G).

=== Group A ===
Pos	Team	Pld	W	L	PF	PA	PD	Pts	Qualification
1	Italy	3	3	0	203	155	+48	6	Quarterfinal round
2	Romania	3	2	1	199	202	−3	5	Quarterfinal round
3	Ireland	3	1	2	172	190	−18	4	Classification round
4	England	3	0	3	156	183	−27	3	Classification round

Source: FIBA Archive

21 July 2006

Boxscore

Italy	77–62	Romania

21 July 2006

Boxscore

England	53–57	Ireland

22 July 2006

Boxscore

Ireland	52–66	Italy

22 July 2006

Boxscore

Romania	66–62	England

23 July 2006

Boxscore

Italy	60–41	England

23 July 2006

Boxscore

Ireland	63–71	Romania

=== Group B ===
Pos	Team	Pld	W	L	PF	PA	PD	Pts	Qualification
1	Latvia	3	3	0	205	152	+53	6	Quarterfinal round
2	Ukraine	3	2	1	234	200	+34	5	Quarterfinal round
3	Iceland	3	1	2	204	203	+1	4	Classification round
4	Macedonia	3	0	3	165	253	−88	3	Classification round

Source: FIBA Archive

21 July 2006

Boxscore

Latvia	75–43	Macedonia

21 July 2006

Boxscore

Iceland	69–82	Ukraine

22 July 2006

Boxscore

Ukraine	52–66	Latvia

22 July 2006

Boxscore

Macedonia	57–78	Iceland

23 July 2006

Boxscore

Latvia	64–57	Iceland

23 July 2006

Boxscore

Ukraine	100–65	Macedonia

=== Group C ===
Pos	Team	Pld	W	L	PF	PA	PD	Pts	Qualification
1	Estonia	2	1	1	130	121	+9	3	Quarterfinal round
2	Bosnia and Herzegovina	2	1	1	119	119	0	3	Quarterfinal round
3	Portugal	2	1	1	119	128	−9	3	Classification round

Source: FIBA Archive

21 July 2006

Boxscore

Estonia	72–58	Portugal

22 July 2006

Boxscore

Portugal	61–56	Bosnia and Herzegovina

23 July 2006

Boxscore

Bosnia and Herzegovina	63–58	Estonia

=== Group D ===
Pos	Team	Pld	W	L	PF	PA	PD	Pts	Qualification
1	Croatia	2	2	0	166	130	+36	4	Quarterfinal round
2	Israel	2	1	1	128	131	−3	3	Quarterfinal round
3	Finland	2	0	2	124	157	−33	2	Classification round

Source: FIBA Archive

21 July 2006

Boxscore

Croatia	90–69	Finland

22 July 2006

Boxscore

Finland	55–67	Israel

23 July 2006

Boxscore

Israel	61–76	Croatia

== Quarterfinal round ==
In the Quarterfinal round, the teams play in two groups of four. The first two teams from each group advance to the Semifinals; the third and fourth teams will play in the 5th–8th place playoffs.

=== Group E ===
Pos	Team	Pld	W	L	PF	PA	PD	Pts	Qualification
1	Italy	3	3	0	197	148	+49	6	Semifinals
2	Ukraine	3	2	1	191	197	−6	5	Semifinals
3	Estonia	3	1	2	192	187	+5	4	5th–8th place playoffs
4	Israel	3	0	3	150	198	−48	3	5th–8th place playoffs

Source: FIBA Archive

25 July 2006

Boxscore

Italy	65–39	Israel

25 July 2006

Boxscore

Ukraine	72–69	Estonia

26 July 2006

Boxscore

Estonia	49–53	Italy

26 July 2006

Boxscore

Israel	49–59	Ukraine

27 July 2006

Boxscore

Italy	79–60	Ukraine

27 July 2006

Boxscore

Estonia	74–62	Israel

=== Group F ===
Pos	Team	Pld	W	L	PF	PA	PD	Pts	Qualification
1	Latvia	3	2	1	203	191	+12	5	Semifinals
2	Croatia	3	2	1	188	180	+8	5	Semifinals
3	Bosnia and Herzegovina	3	1	2	201	181	+20	4	5th–8th place playoffs
4	Romania	3	1	2	173	213	−40	4	5th–8th place playoffs

Source: FIBA Archive

25 July 2006

Boxscore

Romania	50–63	Croatia

25 July 2006

Boxscore

Latvia	63–61	Bosnia and Herzegovina

26 July 2006

Boxscore

Bosnia and Herzegovina	80–51	Romania

26 July 2006

Boxscore

Croatia	58–70	Latvia

27 July 2006

Boxscore

Romania	72–70	Latvia

27 July 2006

Boxscore

Bosnia and Herzegovina	60–67	Croatia

== Classification round for 9th–14th place ==
=== Group G ===
Pos	Team	Pld	W	L	PF	PA	PD	Pts
9	Portugal	5	5	0	342	274	+68	10
10	Ireland	5	3	2	317	295	+22	8
11	Iceland	5	3	2	361	336	+25	8
12	Finland	5	2	3	334	332	+2	7
13	England	5	2	3	315	350	−35	7
14	Macedonia	5	0	5	285	367	−82	5

Source: FIBA Archive

25 July 2006

Boxscore

Macedonia	70–79	Ireland

25 July 2006

Boxscore

England	79–96	Iceland

25 July 2006

Boxscore

Portugal	79–55	Finland

26 July 2006

Boxscore

Ireland	52–54	England

26 July 2006

Boxscore

Finland	82–48	Macedonia

26 July 2006

Boxscore

Iceland	58–60	Portugal

27 July 2006

Boxscore

Finland	54–64	Ireland

27 July 2006

Boxscore

Portugal	73–55	England

27 July 2006

Boxscore

Macedonia	50–65	Iceland

29 July 2006

Boxscore

Ireland	51–54	Portugal

29 July 2006

Boxscore

Iceland	79–76	Finland

29 July 2006

Boxscore

England	65–62	Macedonia

30 July 2006

Boxscore

Iceland	63–71	Ireland

30 July 2006

Boxscore

Macedonia	55–76	Portugal

30 July 2006

Boxscore

Finland	67–62	England

== 5th–8th place playoffs ==
5th–8th place semifinals
E3	Estonia	71
F4	Romania	61
E4	Israel	55
F3	Bosnia and Herzegovina	80

5th place match
E3	Estonia	55
F3	Bosnia and Herzegovina	49
7th place match
F4	Romania	72
E4	Israel	74

=== 5th–8th place semifinals ===
29 July 2006

Boxscore

Estonia	71–61	Romania

29 July 2006

Boxscore

Israel	55–80	Bosnia and Herzegovina

=== 7th place match ===
30 July 2006

Boxscore

Romania	72–74	Israel

=== 5th place match ===
30 July 2006

Boxscore

Estonia	55–49	Bosnia and Herzegovina

== Championship playoffs ==
Semifinals
E1	Italy	64
F2	Croatia	56
E2	Ukraine	68
F1	Latvia	56

Finals
E1	Italy	63
E2	Ukraine	59
3rd place match
F2	Croatia	66
F1	Latvia	51

=== Semifinals ===
29 July 2006

Boxscore

Italy	64–56	Croatia

29 July 2006

Boxscore

Ukraine	68–56	Latvia

=== 3rd place match ===
30 July 2006

Boxscore

Croatia	66–51	Latvia

=== Final ===
30 July 2006

Boxscore

Italy	63–59	Ukraine

== Final standings ==
Promoted to the 2007 FIBA Europe Under-18 Championship for Women Division A

Rank	Team
1st place, gold medalist(s)	Italy
2nd place, silver medalist(s)	Ukraine
3rd place, bronze medalist(s)	Croatia
4	Latvia
5	Estonia
6	Bosnia and Herzegovina
7	Israel
8	Romania
9	Portugal
10	Ireland
11	Iceland
12	Finland
13	England
14	Macedonia
