= 2017 FIBA U18 Women's European Championship Division B =

Tournament details
- Host country: Ireland
- City: Dublin
- Dates: 4–13 August 2017
- Teams: 24 (from 1 confederation)
- Venues: 3 (in 1 host city)

Final positions
- Champions: Germany (1st title)
- Runners-up: Ireland
- Third place: Poland

Official website
- www.fiba.basketball

The 2017 FIBA U18 Women's European Championship Division B was the 13th edition of the Division B of the European basketball championship for women's national under-18 teams. It was played from 4 to 13 August 2017 in Dublin, Republic of Ireland. Germany women's national under-18 basketball team won the tournament.

== Participating teams ==
- Albania
- Austria
- Belarus
- Bulgaria
- Denmark
- Estonia
- Finland
- Georgia
- Germany
- Great Britain
- Iceland
- Ireland
- Israel ▼ (14th place, 2016 FIBA U18 Women's European Championship Division A)
- Luxembourg
- Macedonia
- Moldova
- Netherlands ▼ (16th place, 2016 FIBA U18 Women's European Championship Division A)
- Norway
- Poland
- Portugal
- Romania
- Slovakia ▼ (15th place, 2016 FIBA U18 Women's European Championship Division A)
- Switzerland
- Ukraine

== First round ==
The first-round groups draw took place on 10 December 2016 in Prague, Czech Republic.

In the first round, the teams were drawn into four groups of six. The first two teams from each group advance to the quarterfinals; the third and fourth teams advance to the 9th–16th place playoffs; the other teams will play the 17th–24th place playoffs.

=== Group A ===
Pos	Team	Pld	W	L	PF	PA	PD	Pts	Qualification
1	Poland	5	4	1	321	257	+64	9	Quarterfinals
2	Portugal	5	4	1	347	288	+59	9	Quarterfinals
3	Bulgaria	5	3	2	352	332	+20	8	9th–16th place playoffs
4	Finland	5	3	2	373	341	+32	8	9th–16th place playoffs
5	Luxembourg	5	1	4	253	293	−40	6	17th–24th place playoffs
6	Estonia	5	0	5	235	370	−135	5	17th–24th place playoffs

Source: FIBA

4 August 2017

Boxscore

Finland	59–54	Luxembourg

National Indoor Arena 2

4 August 2017

Boxscore

Bulgaria	69–74	Poland

National Indoor Arena 1

4 August 2017

Boxscore

Estonia	56–83	Portugal

National Indoor Arena 2

5 August 2017

Boxscore

Luxembourg	44–56	Bulgaria

National Indoor Arena 1

5 August 2017

Boxscore

Poland	65–25	Estonia

National Basketball Arena

5 August 2017

Boxscore

Portugal	75–66	Finland

National Indoor Arena 1

6 August 2017

Boxscore

Finland	89–52	Estonia

National Basketball Arena

6 August 2017

Boxscore

Bulgaria	64–73	Portugal

National Basketball Arena

6 August 2017

Boxscore

Luxembourg	45–60	Poland

National Basketball Arena

8 August 2017

Boxscore

Poland	69–72	Finland

National Indoor Arena 2

8 August 2017

Boxscore

Portugal	70–49	Luxembourg

National Basketball Arena

8 August 2017

Boxscore

Estonia	54–72	Bulgaria

National Indoor Arena 2

9 August 2017

Boxscore

Portugal	46–53	Poland

National Indoor Arena 1

9 August 2017

Boxscore

Bulgaria	91–87	Finland

National Indoor Arena 1

9 August 2017

Boxscore

Luxembourg	61–48	Estonia

National Indoor Arena 1

=== Group B ===
Pos	Team	Pld	W	L	PF	PA	PD	Pts	Qualification
1	Germany	5	5	0	380	165	+215	10	Quarterfinals
2	Belarus	5	4	1	351	197	+154	9	Quarterfinals
3	Austria	5	3	2	242	254	−12	8	9th–16th place playoffs
4	Iceland	5	2	3	263	266	−3	7	9th–16th place playoffs
5	Albania	5	1	4	177	431	−254	6	17th–24th place playoffs
6	Denmark	5	0	5	0	100	−100	5	17th–24th place playoffs

Source: FIBA

4 August 2017

Boxscore

Denmark	0–20 w/o	Albania

National Basketball Arena

4 August 2017

Boxscore

Austria	41–79	Belarus

National Basketball Arena

4 August 2017

Boxscore

Iceland	31–104	Germany

National Basketball Arena

5 August 2017

Boxscore

Germany	20–0 w/o	Denmark

National Indoor Arena 2

5 August 2017

Boxscore

Albania	50–91	Austria

National Indoor Arena 2

5 August 2017

Boxscore

Belarus	73–43	Iceland

National Indoor Arena 2

6 August 2017

Boxscore

Denmark	0–20 w/o	Iceland

National Indoor Arena 1

6 August 2017

Boxscore

Austria	35–73	Germany

National Indoor Arena 2

6 August 2017

Boxscore

Albania	35–118	Belarus

National Basketball Arena

8 August 2017

Boxscore

Belarus	20–0 w/o	Denmark

National Indoor Arena 2

8 August 2017

Boxscore

Germany	105–38	Albania

National Indoor Arena 1

8 August 2017

Boxscore

Iceland	52–55	Austria

National Indoor Arena 1

9 August 2017

Boxscore

Austria	20–0 w/o	Denmark

National Indoor Arena 2

9 August 2017

Boxscore

Albania	34–117	Iceland

National Basketball Arena

9 August 2017

Boxscore

Germany	78–61	Belarus

National Indoor Arena 1

=== Group C ===
Pos	Team	Pld	W	L	PF	PA	PD	Pts	Qualification
1	Romania	5	5	0	387	224	+163	10	Quarterfinals
2	Israel	5	4	1	361	244	+117	9	Quarterfinals
3	Netherlands	5	3	2	363	272	+91	8	9th–16th place playoffs
4	Norway	5	2	3	235	328	−93	7	9th–16th place playoffs
5	Georgia	5	1	4	267	415	−148	6	17th–24th place playoffs
6	Switzerland	5	0	5	225	355	−130	5	17th–24th place playoffs

Source: FIBA

4 August 2017

Boxscore

Georgia	50–84	Netherlands

National Indoor Arena 1

4 August 2017

Boxscore

Israel	76–38	Norway

National Indoor Arena 2

4 August 2017

Boxscore

Switzerland	39–75	Romania

National Indoor Arena 1

5 August 2017

Boxscore

Netherlands	62–81	Israel

National Basketball Arena

5 August 2017

Boxscore

Romania	122–47	Georgia

National Indoor Arena 2

5 August 2017

Boxscore

Norway	56–40	Switzerland

National Indoor Arena 1

6 August 2017

Boxscore

Israel	77–39	Georgia

National Indoor Arena 1

6 August 2017

Boxscore

Switzerland	41–81	Netherlands

National Indoor Arena 2

6 August 2017

Boxscore

Norway	34–65	Romania

National Indoor Arena 1

8 August 2017

Boxscore

Georgia	70–63	Switzerland

National Basketball Arena

8 August 2017

Boxscore

Netherlands	86–38	Norway

National Indoor Arena 2

8 August 2017

Boxscore

Romania	63–54	Israel

National Basketball Arena

9 August 2017

Boxscore

Netherlands	50–62	Romania

National Indoor Arena 2

9 August 2017

Boxscore

Switzerland	42–73	Israel

National Indoor Arena 2

9 August 2017

Boxscore

Norway	69–61	Georgia

National Basketball Arena

=== Group D ===
Pos	Team	Pld	W	L	PF	PA	PD	Pts	Qualification
1	Ireland	5	5	0	429	220	+209	10	Quarterfinals
2	Great Britain	5	4	1	444	264	+180	9	Quarterfinals
3	Slovakia	5	3	2	407	289	+118	8	9th–16th place playoffs
4	Ukraine	5	2	3	355	324	+31	7	9th–16th place playoffs
5	Macedonia	5	1	4	302	370	−68	6	17th–24th place playoffs
6	Moldova	5	0	5	176	646	−470	5	17th–24th place playoffs

Source: FIBA

4 August 2017

Boxscore

Ukraine	63–80	Great Britain

National Indoor Arena 2

4 August 2017

Boxscore

Ireland	89–43	Macedonia

National Indoor Arena 1

4 August 2017

Boxscore

Moldova	21–157	Slovakia

National Basketball Arena

5 August 2017

Boxscore

Great Britain	148–28	Moldova

National Indoor Arena 1

5 August 2017

Boxscore

Slovakia	46–84	Ireland

National Basketball Arena

5 August 2017

Boxscore

Macedonia	48–77	Ukraine

National Basketball Arena

6 August 2017

Boxscore

Macedonia	46–81	Great Britain

National Indoor Arena 2

6 August 2017

Boxscore

Ireland	116–25	Moldova

National Indoor Arena 1

6 August 2017

Boxscore

Ukraine	57–64	Slovakia

National Indoor Arena 2

8 August 2017

Boxscore

Moldova	55–101	Ukraine

National Indoor Arena 1

8 August 2017

Boxscore

Great Britain	49–63	Ireland

National Basketball Arena

8 August 2017

Boxscore

Slovakia	76–41	Macedonia

National Indoor Arena 1

9 August 2017

Boxscore

Slovakia	64–86	Great Britain

National Basketball Arena

9 August 2017

Boxscore

Macedonia	124–47	Moldova

National Indoor Arena 2

9 August 2017

Boxscore

Ukraine	57–77	Ireland

National Basketball Arena

== 17th–24th place playoffs ==
21st place match
D5	Macedonia	88
B5	Albania	58
23rd place match
B6	Denmark	0
D6	Moldova	20

21st–24th place semifinals
B6	Denmark	0
D5	Macedonia	20
B5	Albania	101
D6	Moldova	61

17th–24th place quarterfinals
A5	Luxembourg	20
B6	Denmark	0
D5	Macedonia	46
C6	Switzerland	57
B5	Albania	43
A6	Estonia	65
C5	Georgia	66
D6	Moldova	30

17th–20th place semifinals
A5	Luxembourg	77
C6	Switzerland	50
A6	Estonia	89
C5	Georgia	51

17th place match
A5	Luxembourg	69
A6	Estonia	73
19th place match
C6	Switzerland	66
C5	Georgia	52

=== 17th–24th place quarterfinals ===
11 August 2017

Boxscore

Luxembourg	20–0 w/o	Denmark

National Indoor Arena 2

11 August 2017

Boxscore

Macedonia	46–57	Switzerland

National Indoor Arena 2

11 August 2017

Boxscore

Albania	43–65	Estonia

National Indoor Arena 2

11 August 2017

Boxscore

Georgia	66–30	Moldova

National Indoor Arena 2

=== 21st–24th place semifinals ===
12 August 2017

Boxscore

Denmark	0–20 w/o	Macedonia

National Indoor Arena 2

12 August 2017

Boxscore

Albania	101–61	Moldova

National Indoor Arena 2

=== 17th–20th place semifinals ===
12 August 2017

Boxscore

Luxembourg	77–50	Switzerland

National Indoor Arena 2

12 August 2017

Boxscore

Estonia	89–51	Georgia

National Indoor Arena 2

=== 23rd place match ===
13 August 2017

Boxscore

Denmark	0–20 w/o	Moldova

National Indoor Arena 2

=== 21st place match ===
13 August 2017

Boxscore

Macedonia	88–58	Albania

National Indoor Arena 2

=== 19th place match ===
13 August 2017

Boxscore

Switzerland	66–52	Georgia

National Indoor Arena 2

=== 17th place match ===
13 August 2017

Boxscore

Luxembourg	69–73	Estonia

National Indoor Arena 2

== 9th–16th place playoffs ==
13th place match
B4	Iceland	58
D4	Ukraine	54
15th place match
C4	Norway	48
B3	Austria	39

13th–16th place semifinals
B4	Iceland	59
C4	Norway	55
B3	Austria	51
D4	Ukraine	59

9th–16th place quarterfinals
A3	Bulgaria	82
B4	Iceland	58
D3	Slovakia	80
C4	Norway	52
B3	Austria	46
A4	Finland	74
C3	Netherlands	64
D4	Ukraine	52

9th–12th place semifinals
A3	Bulgaria	73
D3	Slovakia	67
A4	Finland	69
C3	Netherlands	50

9th place match
A3	Bulgaria	91
A4	Finland	74
11th place match
D3	Slovakia	50
C3	Netherlands	77

=== 9th–16th place quarterfinals ===
11 August 2017

Boxscore

Bulgaria	82–58	Iceland

National Indoor Arena 1

11 August 2017

Boxscore

Slovakia	80–52	Norway

National Indoor Arena 1

11 August 2017

Boxscore

Austria	46–74	Finland

National Indoor Arena 1

11 August 2017

Boxscore

Netherlands	64–52	Ukraine

National Indoor Arena 1

=== 13th–16th place semifinals ===
12 August 2017

Boxscore

Iceland	59–55	Norway

National Indoor Arena 1

12 August 2017

Boxscore

Austria	51–59	Ukraine

National Indoor Arena 1

=== 9th–12th place semifinals ===
12 August 2017

Boxscore

Bulgaria	73–67	Slovakia

National Indoor Arena 1

12 August 2017

Boxscore

Finland	69–50	Netherlands

National Indoor Arena 1

=== 15th place match ===
13 August 2017

Boxscore

Norway	48–39	Austria

National Indoor Arena 1

=== 13th place match ===
13 August 2017

Boxscore

Iceland	58–54	Ukraine

National Indoor Arena 1

=== 11th place match ===
13 August 2017

Boxscore

Slovakia	50–77	Netherlands

National Indoor Arena 1

=== 9th place match ===
13 August 2017

Boxscore

Bulgaria	91–74	Finland

National Indoor Arena 1

== Championship playoffs ==
5th place match
B2	Belarus	68
A2	Portugal	78
7th place match
C2	Israel	69
C1	Romania	67

5th–8th place semifinals
B2	Belarus	64
C2	Israel	63
A2	Portugal	65
C1	Romania	55

Quarterfinals
A1	Poland	70
B2	Belarus	53
D1	Ireland	60
C2	Israel	55
B1	Germany	61
A2	Portugal	44
C1	Romania	46
D2	Great Britain	55

Semifinals
A1	Poland	57
D1	Ireland	68
B1	Germany	64
D2	Great Britain	55

Final
D1	Ireland	43
B1	Germany	67
3rd place match
A1	Poland	64
D2	Great Britain	50

=== Quarterfinals ===
11 August 2017

Boxscore

Poland	70–53	Belarus

National Basketball Arena

11 August 2017

Boxscore

Germany	61–44	Portugal

National Basketball Arena

11 August 2017

Boxscore

Ireland	60–55	Israel

National Basketball Arena

11 August 2017

Boxscore

Romania	46–55	Great Britain

National Basketball Arena

=== 5th–8th place semifinals ===
12 August 2017

Boxscore

Belarus	64–63	Israel

National Basketball Arena

12 August 2017

Boxscore

Portugal	65–55	Romania

National Basketball Arena

=== Semifinals ===
12 August 2017

Boxscore

Poland	57–68	Ireland

National Basketball Arena

12 August 2017

Boxscore

Germany	64–55	Great Britain

National Basketball Arena

=== 7th place match ===
13 August 2017

Boxscore

Israel	69–67	Romania

National Basketball Arena

=== 5th place match ===
13 August 2017

Boxscore

Belarus	68–78	Portugal

National Basketball Arena

=== 3rd place match ===
13 August 2017

Boxscore

Poland	64–50	Great Britain

National Basketball Arena

=== Final ===
13 August 2017

Boxscore

Ireland	43–67	Germany

National Basketball Arena

== Final standings ==
Rank	Team
1st place, gold medalist(s)	Germany
2nd place, silver medalist(s)	Ireland
3rd place, bronze medalist(s)	Poland
4	Great Britain
5	Portugal
6	Belarus
7	Israel
8	Romania
9	Bulgaria
10	Finland
11	Netherlands
12	Slovakia
13	Iceland
14	Ukraine
15	Norway
16	Austria
17	Estonia
18	Luxembourg
19	Switzerland
20	Georgia
21	Macedonia
22	Albania
23	Moldova
24	Denmark

Promoted to the 2018 FIBA U18 Women's European Championship Division A
