= 2001 FIBA Under-19 World Championship for Women =

2001 FIBA Under-19 Women's Basketball World Cup
Tournament details
- Host country: Czech Republic
- Dates: July 14–22
- Teams: 12 (from 5 federations)
- Venue: 1 (in 1 host city)

Final positions
- Champions: Czech Republic (1st title)

Tournament statistics
- Top scorer: (Japan) Oga (25.4)
- Top rebounds: (Brazil) Souza (10.9)
- Top assists: (Czech Republic) Uhrova (6)
- PPG (Team): United States (88.1)
- RPG (Team): Russia (43.6)
- APG (Team): Czech Republic (15.3)

The 2001 FIBA Under-19 World Championship for Women (Czech: Mistrovství světa FIBA žen do 19 let 2001)took place in the Czech Republic from 14 to 22 July 2001. It was co-organised by the International Basketball Federation (FIBA) and Czech Basketball Federation.

Twelve national teams competed for the championship. Czech Republic came away with the Gold medal by defeating Russia 82–80 in the final.

== Venues ==
- Brno

== Competing nations ==
Except Czech Republic, which automatically qualified as the host nation, the 11 remaining countries qualified through their continents’ qualifying tournaments:

FIBA Africa (1)

- Mali

FIBA Americas (3)

- Brazil
- Cuba
- United States

FIBA Asia (2)

- China
- Japan

FIBA Oceania (1)

- Australia

FIBA Europe (4+1)

- Czech Republic (Hosts)
- France
- Lithuania
- Poland
- Russia

== Final standings ==
#	Team	W-L
	Czech Republic	6-1
	Russia	5-2
	United States	6-1
4	Australia	5-2
5	France	5-2
6	Cuba	3-4
7	Brazil	4-3
8	Lithuania	2-5
9	China	3-4
10	Poland	2-5
11	Japan	1-6
12	Mali	0-7

== Awards ==
2001 FIBA Women's World Junior Championship winner

Czech Republic
First title
