= Finland women's national under-18 basketball team =

Finland
- FIBA zone: FIBA Europe
- National federation: Basketball Finland

U19 World Cup
- Appearances: 1

U18 EuroBasket
- Appearances: 9
- Medals: (silver) Silver: 1 (2025); (bronze) Bronze: 1 (2026)

U18 EuroBasket Division B
- Appearances: 15
- Medals: (gold) Gold: 1 (2019)

The Finland women's national under-18 basketball team is a national women's basketball team of Finland, administered by the Basketball Finland. It represents the country in under-18 women's international basketball competitions.

== FIBA U18 Women's EuroBasket participations ==
Year	Division A	Division B
(Bulgaria) 1977	8th	-
(Italy) 1979	7th	-
(Hungary) 1981	8th	-
(Slovenia) 2002	11th	-
(Bosnia and Herzegovina) 2005	-	5th
(Italy) 2006	-	9th
(Romania) 2007	-	15th
(North Macedonia) 2008	-	16th
(Israel) 2009	-	8th
(Romania) 2010	-	7th
(Hungary) 2011	-	4th
(North Macedonia) 2012	-	11th

Year	Division A	Division B
(Hungary) 2013	-	11th
(Romania) 2014	-	5th
(Romania) 2015	-	10th
(Bosnia and Herzegovina) 2016	-	10th
(Republic of Ireland) 2017	-	10th
(Austria) 2018	-	7th
(North Macedonia) 2019	-	1st place, gold medalist(s)
(Greece) 2022	7th	-
(Turkey) 2023	10th	-
(Portugal) 2024	8th	-
(Spain) 2025	2nd place, silver medalist(s)	-
(Sweden) 2026	3rd place, bronze medalist(s)	-

== FIBA Under-19 Women's Basketball World Cup participations ==
Year	Result
(China) 2027	Qualified

== See also ==
- Finland women's national basketball team
- Finland women's national under-16 basketball team
- Finland men's national under-19 basketball team
