= 2018 FIBA U18 Women's European Championship =

Basket-ball competition

35th FIBA Under-18 Women's European Basketball Championship

Tournament details
- Host country: Italy
- Dates: 4–12 August 2018
- Teams: 16
- Venues: 2 (in 1 host city)

Final positions
- Champions: Germany (1st title)

Tournament statistics
- MVP: (Germany) Nyara Sabally
- Top scorer: (Hungary) Barbara Angyal (14.1)
- Top rebounds: (Latvia) Laura Meldere (12.4)
- Top assists: (Croatia) Nika Mühl (5.7)
- PPG (Team): (Germany) (66.4)
- RPG (Team): (Germany) (51.3)
- APG (Team): (Croatia) (21.3)

Official website
- www.fiba.basketball

The 2018 FIBA U18 Women's European Championship was an international basketball competition that was held from 4 to 12 August 2018 in Udine, Italy. It was the 35th edition of the FIBA U18 Women's European Championship. 16 national teams from across Europe, composed of women aged 18 and under, competed in the tournament.

== Venues ==
Udine		2018 FIBA U18 Women's European Championship is located in Italy
Palasport Primo Carnera	Palasport Manlio Benedetti	2018 FIBA U18 Women's European Championship is located in Italy
Capacity: 3,300	Capacity: 2,000	2018 FIBA U18 Women's European Championship is located in Italy

== Participating teams ==
- Belgium
- Bosnia and Herzegovina
- Croatia
- Czech Republic
- France
- Germany ▲ (Winners, 2017 FIBA U18 Women's European Championship Division B)
- Hungary
- Ireland ▲ (Runners-up, 2017 FIBA U18 Women's European Championship Division B)
- Italy (Host)
- Latvia
- Poland ▲ (Third place, 2017 FIBA U18 Women's European Championship Division B)
- Russia
- Serbia
- Slovenia
- Sweden
- Spain

== First round ==
The first-round groups draw took place on 16 January 2018 in Freising, Germany.

All times are local (UTC+2).

=== Group A ===
Pos	Team	Pld	W	L	PF	PA	PD	Pts
1	Belgium	3	2	1	187	157	+30	5 (Note: Belgium 1–1, +9 PD; Italy 1–1, −2 PD; Croatia 1–1, −7 PD)
2	Italy (H)	3	2	1	169	159	+10	5
3	Croatia	3	2	1	173	170	+3	5
4	Sweden	3	0	3	147	190	−43	3

Source: FIBA
(H) Hosts
Notes:

4 August
21:00

Boxscore

Belgium	67–46	Sweden
Scoring by quarter: 14–5, 22–17, 15–7, 16–17
Pts: Van Buggenhout 14; Rebs: Bi. Massey 9 Asts: Hambursin 4		Pts: Ahlberg 10; Rebs: Johnson 9 Asts: Elias 4

Palasport Manlio Benedetti, Udine

4 August
21:00

Boxscore

Italy	52–56	Croatia
Scoring by quarter: 15–10, 7–13, 17–14, 13–19
Pts: Gregori 16; Rebs: Baldi 8 Asts: Ianezic, Orsili 2		Pts: Mühl 15; Rebs: Kostić 11; Asts: Kostić 5

Palasport Primo Carnera, Udine

5 August
16:30

Boxscore

Croatia	56–67	Belgium
Scoring by quarter: 10–16, 16–15, 11–23, 19–13
Pts: Mühl 12; Rebs: Mihić 8 Asts: Mühl 7		Pts: Leblon 15; Rebs: Bi. Massey 18; Asts: three players 3

Palasport Manlio Benedetti, Udine

5 August
21:00

Boxscore

Sweden	50–62	Italy
Scoring by quarter: 9–10, 20–19, 8–14, 13–19
Pts: Sabel 14; Rebs: Johnson 11; Asts: Elias 4		Pts: Ianezic 13; Rebs: Toffolo 10; Asts: Ianezic 4

Palasport Primo Carnera, Udine

6 August
16:30

Boxscore

Croatia	61–51	Sweden
Scoring by quarter: 18–16, 18–13, 22–12, 3–10
Pts: Ćurić 14; Rebs: Kostić 10; Asts: Mühl 6		Pts: Sabel 11; Rebs: Johnson 13; Asts: Elias 4

Palasport Manlio Benedetti, Udine

6 August
21:00

Boxscore

Belgium	53–55	Italy
Scoring by quarter: 18–5, 15–15, 12–19, 8–16
Pts: Bi. Massey 14; Rebs: Bi. Massey 10; Asts: Leblon 6		Pts: Gregori, Orsili 12; Rebs: Toffolo 11; Asts: Orsili 4

Palasport Primo Carnera, Udine

=== Group B ===
Pos	Team	Pld	W	L	PF	PA	PD	Pts
1	Latvia	3	2	1	207	166	+41	5 (Note: Latvia 1–1, +8 PD; Hungary 1–1, −1 PD; Germany 1–1, −7 PD)
2	Hungary	3	2	1	190	166	+24	5
3	Germany	3	2	1	193	176	+17	5
4	Slovenia	3	0	3	133	215	−82	3

Source: FIBA
Notes:

4 August
14:15

Boxscore

Slovenia	42–67	Hungary
Scoring by quarter: 14–17, 11–16, 12–17, 5–17
Pts: Burgar 17; Rebs: Ŝarić 10; Asts: Dautović 3		Pts: Angyal 19; Rebs: Varga 11; Asts: Angyal 4

Palasport Primo Carnera, Udine

4 August
18:45

Boxscore

Germany	66–62	Latvia
Scoring by quarter: 13–15, 18–17, 14–15, 21–15
Pts: Sabally 22; Rebs: Sabally 12; Asts: Sabally, Fiebich 4		Pts: Ozola 16; Rebs: Meldere 10; Asts: Meldere 3

Palasport Primo Carnera, Udine

5 August
18:45

Boxscore

Hungary	64–53	Germany
Scoring by quarter: 22–12, 17–12, 10–13, 15–16
Pts: Angyal 13; Rebs: Varga 8 Asts: Angyal, Mányoky 4		Pts: Landwehr 13; Rebs: Bessoir 10; Asts: Forner 5

Palasport Primo Carnera, Udine

5 August
21:00

Boxscore

Latvia	74–41	Slovenia
Scoring by quarter: 16–5, 29–5, 16–17, 13–14
Pts: Markova 19; Rebs: Gulbe, Meldere 12; Asts: Nulle 4		Pts: Debeljak, Ahac 9 Rebs: Šarić 10; Asts: five players 1

Palasport Manlio Benedetti, Udine

6 August
14:15

Boxscore

Slovenia	50–74	Germany
Scoring by quarter: 12–17, 14–18, 9–23, 15–16
Pts: Debeljak 8 Rebs: Hribljan, Šarić 8 Asts: Šarić 4		Pts: Schiffer 14; Rebs: Fiebich 9 Asts: Forner, Geiselsöder 4

Palasport Manlio Benedetti, Udine

6 August
18:45

Boxscore

Latvia	71–59	Hungary
Scoring by quarter: 16–13, 16–14, 22–18, 17–14
Pts: Gulbe 24; Rebs: Meldere 11; Asts: Zumenta, Nulle 4		Pts: Angyal 20; Rebs: Varga 12; Asts: Varga 4

Palasport Manlio Benedetti, Udine

=== Group C ===
Pos	Team	Pld	W	L	PF	PA	PD	Pts
1	Czech Republic	3	2	1	229	183	+46	5 (Note: Czech Republic 1–1, +31 PD; Spain 1–1, −7 PD; Serbia 1–1, −24 PD)
2	Spain	3	2	1	200	170	+30	5
3	Serbia	3	2	1	167	179	−12	5
4	Bosnia and Herzegovina	3	0	3	166	230	−64	3

Source: FIBA
Notes:

4 August
14:15

Boxscore

Bosnia and Herzegovina	53–65	Serbia
Scoring by quarter: –, –, –, –

Palasport Manlio Benedetti, Udine

4 August
16:30

Boxscore

Spain	71–67	Czech Republic
Scoring by quarter: –, –, –, –

Palasport Primo Carnera, Udine

5 August
14:15

Boxscore

Czech Republic	83–68	Bosnia and Herzegovina
Scoring by quarter: –, –, –, –

Palasport Manlio Benedetti, Udine

5 August
18:45

Boxscore

Serbia	58–47	Spain
Scoring by quarter: –, –, –, –

Palasport Manlio Benedetti, Udine

6 August
16:30

Boxscore

Czech Republic	79–44	Serbia
Scoring by quarter: –, –, –, –

Palasport Primo Carnera, Udine

6 August
18:45

Boxscore

Bosnia and Herzegovina	45–82	Spain
Scoring by quarter: –, –, –, –

Palasport Primo Carnera, Udine

=== Group D ===
Pos	Team	Pld	W	L	PF	PA	PD	Pts
1	France	3	3	0	179	142	+37	6
2	Russia	3	2	1	202	161	+41	5
3	Poland	3	1	2	184	179	+5	4
4	Ireland	3	0	3	120	203	−83	3

Source: FIBA

4 August
16:30

Boxscore

France	57–50	Russia
Scoring by quarter: –, –, –, –

Palasport Manlio Benedetti, Udine

4 August
18:45

Boxscore

Ireland	44–64	Poland
Scoring by quarter: –, –, –, –

Palasport Manlio Benedetti, Udine

5 August
14:15

Boxscore

Poland	53–60	France
Scoring by quarter: –, –, –, –

Palasport Primo Carnera, Udine

5 August
16:30

Boxscore

Russia	77–37	Ireland
Scoring by quarter: –, –, –, –

Palasport Primo Carnera, Udine

6 August
14:15

Boxscore

Russia	75–67	Poland
Scoring by quarter: –, –, –, –

Palasport Primo Carnera, Udine

6 August
21:00

Boxscore

Ireland	39–62	France
Scoring by quarter: –, –, –, –

Palasport Manlio Benedetti, Udine

== Playoff round ==
=== Championship bracket ===
Round of 16
8 August
Belgium	59
Slovenia	35
8 August
Spain	61
Poland	40
8 August
Hungary	63
Croatia	58
8 August
France	91
Bosnia and Herzegovina	47
8 August
Italy	46
Germany	67
8 August
Czech Republic	71
Ireland	37
8 August
Latvia	59
Sweden	47
8 August
Russia	63
Serbia	54

Quarterfinals
9 August
Belgium	72
Spain	73
9 August
Hungary	69
France	61
9 August
Germany	72
Czech Republic	44
9 August
Latvia	69
Russia	62

Semifinals
11 August
Spain	57
Hungary	54
11 August
Germany	66
Latvia	37

Final
12 August
Spain	54
Germany	67
3rd place game
12 August
Hungary	58
Latvia	56

=== 5th place bracket ===
5th–8th place semifinals
11 August
Belgium	59
France	49
11 August
Czech Republic	59
Russia	51

5th place game
12 August
Belgium	68
Czech Republic	27
7th place game
12 August
France	65
Russia	60

=== 9th place bracket ===
9th–16th place quarterfinals
9 August
Slovenia	51
Poland	79
9 August
Croatia	84
Bosnia and Herzegovina	57
9 August
Italy	64
Ireland	54
9 August
Sweden	54
Serbia	61

9th–12th place semifinals
11 August
Poland	49
Croatia	75
11 August
Italy	69
Serbia	57

9th place game
12 August
Croatia	69
Italy	54
11th place game
12 August
Poland	74
Serbia	48

=== 13th place bracket ===
13th–16th place semifinals
11 August
Slovenia	47
Bosnia and Herzegovina	67
11 August
Ireland	53
Sweden	52

13th place game
12 August
Bosnia and Herzegovina	71
Ireland	63
15th place game
12 August
Slovenia	57
Sweden	64

== Final standings ==
Rank	Team	Record
1st place, gold medalist(s)	Germany	6–1
2nd place, silver medalist(s)	Spain	5–2
3rd place, bronze medalist(s)	Hungary	5–2
4	Latvia	4–3
5	Belgium	5–2
6	Czech Republic	4–3
7	France	5–2
8	Russia	3–4
9	Croatia	5–2
10	Italy	4–3
11	Poland	3–4
12	Serbia	3–4
13	Bosnia and Herzegovina	2–5
14	Ireland	1–6
15	Sweden	1–6
16	Slovenia	0–7

Qualified for the 2019 FIBA Under-19 Women's Basketball World Cup
Relegated to the 2019 FIBA U18 Women's European Championship Division B

== Awards ==
2018 FIBA U18 Women's European Championship
Winners

Germany
First title

Most Valuable Player
(Germany) Nyara Sabally

=== All-Tournament Team ===
- (Latvia) Aleksa Gulbe
- (Spain) María Pendande
- (Germany) Leonie Fiebich
- (Germany) Nyara Sabally
- (Hungary) Barbara Angyal

=== Fair Play Award ===
- (Serbia) Jelena Mitrović
