= 1993 FIBA Under-19 World Championship for Women =

1993 FIBA Under-19 Women's Basketball World Cup
Tournament details
- Host country: South Korea
- Dates: August 1–8
- Teams: 12 (from 5 federations)

Final positions
- Champions: Australia (1st title)

Tournament statistics
- MVP: (Australia) Michelle Brogan

The 1993 FIBA Under-19 World Championship for Women (Korean: 1993 FIBA 19 세 이하 세계 여자 선수권 대회) took place in South Korea from 1 to 8 August 1993. It was co-organised by the International Basketball Federation (FIBA) and Korea Basketball Association, the Korean national federation.

Twelve national teams competed for the championship. Australia came away with the Gold medal by defeating Russia 72-54 in the final.

== Competing nations ==
Except Korea, which automatically qualified as the host nation, the 11 remaining countries qualified through their continents’ qualifying tournaments:

FIBA Africa (1)

- Zaire

FIBA Asia (4)

- China
- Japan
- South Korea
- Chinese Taipei

FIBA Americas (2)

- Brazil
- United States

FIBA Oceania (1)

- Australia

FIBA Europe (4)

- France
- Russia
- Poland
- Bulgaria

== Final standings ==
#	Team	W-L
	Australia	7-0
	Russia	5-2
	Poland	5-2
4	South Korea	4-3
5	Brazil	5-2
6	France	3-4
7	United States	5-2
8	Japan	2-5
9	Bulgaria	3-4
10	Zaire	1-6
11	China	2-5
12	Chinese Taipei	0-7

== Awards ==
1993 FIBA Women's World Junior Championship winner

Australia
First title

Most Valuable Player
(Australia) Michelle Brogan
