= 2018 FIBA U18 Women's European Championship Division B =

Tournament details
- Host country: Austria
- City: Fürstenfeld; Güssing; Oberwart
- Dates: 3–12 August 2018
- Teams: 24 (from 1 confederation)
- Venues: 3 (in 3 host cities)

Final positions
- Champions: Lithuania (1st title)
- Runners-up: Belarus
- Third place: Israel

Official website
- www.fiba.basketball

The 2018 FIBA U18 Women's European Championship Division B was the 14th edition of the Division B of the Women's European basketball championship for national under-18 teams. It was played in Austrian towns of Fürstenfeld, Güssing and Oberwart from 3 to 12 August 2018. Lithuania women's national under-18 basketball team won the tournament.

== Participating teams ==
- Albania
- Austria
- Belarus
- Bulgaria
- Cyprus ▲ (1st place, 2017 FIBA U18 Women's European Championship Division C)
- Denmark
- Finland
- Georgia
- Great Britain
- Greece ▼ (16th place, 2017 FIBA U18 Women's European Championship Division A)
- Iceland
- Israel
- Kosovo
- Lithuania ▼ (14th place, 2017 FIBA U18 Women's European Championship Division A)
- Luxembourg
- Montenegro
- Netherlands
- Norway
- Portugal
- Romania
- Slovakia
- Switzerland
- Turkey ▼ (15th place, 2017 FIBA U18 Women's European Championship Division A)
- Ukraine

== First round ==
=== Group A ===
Pos	Team	Pld	W	L	PF	PA	PD	Pts	Qualification
1	Finland	5	5	0	453	239	+214	10	Quarterfinals
2	Portugal	5	4	1	345	252	+93	9	Quarterfinals
3	Romania	5	3	2	361	261	+100	8	9th–16th place playoffs
4	Cyprus	5	2	3	251	343	−92	7	9th–16th place playoffs
5	Iceland	5	1	4	285	353	−68	6	17th–24th place playoffs
6	Georgia	5	0	5	236	483	−247	5	17th–24th place playoffs

Source: FIBA

=== Group B ===
Pos	Team	Pld	W	L	PF	PA	PD	Pts	Qualification
1	Lithuania	5	4	1	455	310	+145	9	Quarterfinals
2	Israel	5	4	1	361	240	+121	9	Quarterfinals
3	Greece	5	4	1	335	268	+67	9	9th–16th place playoffs
4	Switzerland	5	2	3	296	352	−56	7	9th–16th place playoffs
5	Bulgaria	5	1	4	324	381	−57	6	17th–24th place playoffs
6	Albania	5	0	5	247	467	−220	5	17th–24th place playoffs

Source: FIBA

=== Group C ===
Pos	Team	Pld	W	L	PF	PA	PD	Pts	Qualification
1	Turkey	5	4	1	331	294	+37	9	Quarterfinals
2	Netherlands	5	3	2	309	300	+9	8	Quarterfinals
3	Great Britain	5	3	2	349	321	+28	8	9th–16th place playoffs
4	Denmark	5	3	2	321	294	+27	8	9th–16th place playoffs
5	Montenegro	5	2	3	300	297	+3	7	17th–24th place playoffs
6	Austria	5	0	5	227	331	−104	5	17th–24th place playoffs

Source: FIBA

=== Group D ===
Pos	Team	Pld	W	L	PF	PA	PD	Pts	Qualification
1	Belarus	5	5	0	459	242	+217	10	Quarterfinals
2	Ukraine	5	4	1	326	257	+69	9	Quarterfinals
3	Luxembourg	5	3	2	322	258	+64	8	9th–16th place playoffs
4	Slovakia	5	2	3	327	298	+29	7	9th–16th place playoffs
5	Norway	5	1	4	226	343	−117	6	17th–24th place playoffs
6	Kosovo	5	0	5	218	480	−262	5	17th–24th place playoffs

Source: FIBA

== 17th–24th place playoffs ==
21st place match
B6	Albania	63
D6	Kosovo	61
23rd place match
D5	Norway	57
A6	Georgia	52

21st–24th place semifinals
B6	Albania	76
D5	Norway	50
A6	Georgia	43
D6	Kosovo	44

17th–24th place quarterfinals
A5	Iceland	89
B6	Albania	50
D5	Norway	35
C6	Austria	60
B5	Bulgaria	80
A6	Georgia	69
C5	Montenegro	119
D6	Kosovo	48

17th–20th place semifinals
A5	Iceland	63
C6	Austria	72
B5	Bulgaria	52
C5	Montenegro	79

17th place match
C6	Austria	74
C5	Montenegro	61
19th place match
A5	Iceland	75
B5	Bulgaria	71

== 9th–16th place playoffs ==
13th place match
C4	Denmark	68
D4	Slovakia	55
15th place match
B4	Switzerland	58
A4	Cyprus	37

13th–16th place semifinals
B4	Switzerland	63
C4	Denmark	73
A4	Cyprus	60
D4	Slovakia	65

9th–16th place quarterfinals
A3	Romania	70
B4	Switzerland	46
D3	Luxembourg	80
C4	Denmark	68
B3	Greece	79
A4	Cyprus	35
C3	Great Britain	73
D4	Slovakia	62

9th–12th place semifinals
A3	Romania	55
D3	Luxembourg	50
B3	Greece	60
C3	Great Britain	67

9th place match
A3	Romania	56
C3	Great Britain	45
11th place match
D3	Luxembourg	55
B3	Greece	62

== Championship playoffs ==
5th place match
C2	Netherlands	44
A2	Portugal	71
7th place match
A1	Finland	80
D2	Ukraine	56

5th–8th place semifinals
A1	Finland	70
C2	Netherlands	75
A2	Portugal	72
D2	Ukraine	58

Quarterfinals
A1	Finland	73
B2	Israel	79
D1	Belarus	77
C2	Netherlands	64
B1	Lithuania	77
A2	Portugal	66
C1	Turkey	57
D2	Ukraine	45

Semifinals
B2	Israel	73
D1	Belarus	83
B1	Lithuania	69
C1	Turkey	49

Final
D1	Belarus	71
B1	Lithuania	86
3rd place match
B2	Israel	63
C1	Turkey	51

== Final standings ==
Rank	Team
1st place, gold medalist(s)	Lithuania
2nd place, silver medalist(s)	Belarus
3rd place, bronze medalist(s)	Israel
4	Turkey
5	Portugal
6	Netherlands
7	Finland
8	Ukraine
9	Romania
10	Great Britain
11	Greece
12	Luxembourg
13	Denmark
14	Slovakia
15	Switzerland
16	Cyprus
17	Austria
18	Montenegro
19	Iceland
20	Bulgaria
21	Albania
22	Kosovo
23	Norway
24	Georgia

Promoted to the 2019 FIBA U18 Women's European Championship Division A
Relegated to the 2019 FIBA U18 Women's European Championship Division C
