= 2019 FIBA U18 Women's European Championship Division B =

Tournament details
- Host country: North Macedonia
- City: Skopje
- Dates: 5–14 July 2019
- Teams: 23 (from 1 confederation)
- Venues: 3 (in 1 host city)

Final positions
- Champions: Finland (1st title)
- Runners-up: Greece
- Third place: Turkey

Official website
- www.fiba.basketball

The 2019 FIBA U18 Women's European Championship Division B was the 15th edition of the Division B of the FIBA U18 Women's European Championship, the second tier of the European women's under-18 basketball championship. It was played in Skopje, North Macedonia, from 5 to 14 July 2019. Finland women's national under-18 basketball team won the tournament.

== Participating teams ==
- Albania
- Austria
- Bulgaria
- Denmark
- Estonia
- Finland
- Great Britain
- Greece
- Iceland
- Ireland ▼ (14th place, 2018 FIBA U18 Women's European Championship Division A)
- Kosovo
- Luxembourg
- Netherlands
- North Macedonia
- Norway
- Portugal
- Romania
- Slovakia
- Slovenia ▼ (16th place, 2018 FIBA U18 Women's European Championship Division A)
- Sweden ▼ (15th place, 2018 FIBA U18 Women's European Championship Division A)
- Switzerland
- Turkey
- Ukraine

== First round ==
=== Group A ===
Pos	Team	Pld	W	L	PF	PA	PD	Pts	Qualification
1	Finland	5	5	0	380	249	+131	10	Quarterfinals
2	Denmark	5	4	1	400	236	+164	9	Quarterfinals
3	Slovenia	5	3	2	348	209	+139	8	9th–16th place playoffs
4	Estonia	5	2	3	320	338	−18	7	9th–16th place playoffs
5	Norway	5	1	4	196	336	−140	6	17th–23rd place classification
6	Kosovo	5	0	5	172	448	−276	5	17th–23rd place classification

Source: FIBA

=== Group B ===
Pos	Team	Pld	W	L	PF	PA	PD	Pts	Qualification
1	Turkey	4	4	0	330	195	+135	8	Quarterfinals
2	Portugal	4	3	1	283	199	+84	7	Quarterfinals
3	Switzerland	4	2	2	271	246	+25	6	9th–16th place playoffs
4	Iceland	4	1	3	202	322	−120	5	9th–16th place playoffs
5	Bulgaria	4	0	4	215	339	−124	4	17th–23rd place classification

Source: FIBA

=== Group C ===
Pos	Team	Pld	W	L	PF	PA	PD	Pts	Qualification
1	Greece	5	5	0	303	215	+88	10	Quarterfinals
2	Romania	5	3	2	275	255	+20	8	Quarterfinals
3	Ireland	5	3	2	283	249	+34	8	9th–16th place playoffs
4	Slovakia	5	3	2	256	276	−20	8	9th–16th place playoffs
5	Austria	5	1	4	244	289	−45	6	17th–23rd place classification
6	North Macedonia	5	0	5	205	282	−77	5	17th–23rd place classification

Source: FIBA

=== Group D ===
Pos	Team	Pld	W	L	PF	PA	PD	Pts	Qualification
1	Sweden	5	5	0	366	212	+154	10	Quarterfinals
2	Netherlands	5	4	1	365	242	+123	9	Quarterfinals
3	Ukraine	5	3	2	306	288	+18	8	9th–16th place playoffs
4	Luxembourg	5	2	3	216	270	−54	7	9th–16th place playoffs
5	Great Britain	5	1	4	235	307	−72	6	17th–23rd place classification
6	Albania	5	0	5	241	410	−169	5	17th–23rd place classification

Source: FIBA

== 17th–23rd place classification ==
=== Group E ===
Pos	Team	Pld	W	L	PF	PA	PD	Pts	Qualification
1	Bulgaria	2	2	0	139	112	+27	4	17th place match
2	Norway	2	1	1	103	107	−4	3	19th place match
3	Kosovo	2	0	2	112	135	−23	2	21st place match

Source: FIBA

=== Playoffs ===
21st place match
E3	Kosovo	65
C6	North Macedonia	86
23rd place
D6	Albania

21st–23rd place semifinals
Group E
D6	Albania	64
C6	North Macedonia	77

17th–23rd place quarterfinals
Group E
Group E
C5	Austria	90
D6	Albania	46
D5	Great Britain	57
C6	North Macedonia	54

17th–20th place semifinals
Group E
C5	Austria	67
D5	Great Britain	52

17th place match
E1	Bulgaria	62
C5	Austria	65
19th place match
E2	Norway	40
D5	Great Britain	55

== 9th–16th place playoffs ==
13th place match
D3	Ukraine	70
D4	Luxembourg	46
15th place match
B4	Iceland	76
A4	Estonia	75

13th–16th place semifinals
B4	Iceland	60
D3	Ukraine	77
A4	Estonia	60
D4	Luxembourg	65

9th–16th place quarterfinals
A3	Slovenia	72
B4	Iceland	45
D3	Ukraine	51
C4	Slovakia	66
B3	Switzerland	70
A4	Estonia	54
C3	Ireland	65
D4	Luxembourg	54

9th–12th place semifinals
A3	Slovenia	56
C4	Slovakia	64
B3	Switzerland	52
C3	Ireland	61

9th place match
C4	Slovakia	48
C3	Ireland	61
11th place match
A3	Slovenia	53
B3	Switzerland	51

== Championship playoffs ==
5th place match
B2	Portugal	60
A2	Denmark	70
7th place match
C2	Romania	58
D2	Netherlands	82

5th–8th place semifinals
B2	Portugal	80
C2	Romania	45
A2	Denmark	61
D2	Netherlands	55

Quarterfinals
A1	Finland	82
B2	Portugal	48
D1	Sweden	63
C2	Romania	55
B1	Turkey	62
A2	Denmark	58
C1	Greece	65
D2	Netherlands	53

Semifinals
A1	Finland	65
D1	Sweden	46
B1	Turkey	56
C1	Greece	58

Final
A1	Finland	63
C1	Greece	56
3rd place match
D1	Sweden	57
B1	Turkey	65

== Final standings ==
Rank	Team
1st place, gold medalist(s)	Finland
2nd place, silver medalist(s)	Greece
3rd place, bronze medalist(s)	Turkey
4	Sweden
5	Denmark
6	Portugal
7	Netherlands
8	Romania
9	Ireland
10	Slovakia
11	Slovenia
12	Switzerland
13	Ukraine
14	Luxembourg
15	Iceland
16	Estonia
17	Austria
18	Bulgaria
19	Great Britain
20	Norway
21	North Macedonia
22	Kosovo
23	Albania

Promoted to the 2022 FIBA U18 Women's European Championship Division A
Promoted after the exclusion of Russia and Belarus
