= Turkey women's national under-18 basketball team =

Turkey
- Joined FIBA: 1936
- FIBA zone: FIBA Europe
- National federation: TBF

U19 World Cup
- Appearances: None

U18 EuroBasket
- Appearances: 18
- Medals: None

U18 EuroBasket Division B
- Appearances: 3
- Medals: (bronze) Bronze: 2 (2015, 2019)
Home	Away

The Turkey women's national under-18 basketball team (Turkish: Türkiye Ümit Kız Milli Basketbol Takımı) is a national basketball team of Turkey, administered by the Turkish Basketball Federation. It represents the country in under-18 women's international basketball competitions.

== FIBA U18 Women's EuroBasket participations ==
Year	Position
1965–1996	did not qualify
(Turkey) 1998	9th
(Poland) 2000	did not qualify
(Slovenia) 2002	did not qualify
(Slovakia) 2004	6th
(Hungary) 2005	10th
(Spain) 2006	10th
(Serbia) 2007	11th
(Slovakia) 2008	9th
(Sweden) 2009	13th
(Slovakia) 2010	10th
(Romania) 2011	7th
(Romania) 2012	6th

Year	Position
(Croatia) 2013	7th
(Portugal) 2014	15th
(Romania) 2015	Division B, 3rd
(Hungary) 2016	8th
(Hungary) 2017	15th
(Austria) 2018	Division B, 4th
(North Macedonia) 2019	Division B, 3rd
(Greece) 2022	10th
(Turkey) 2023	6th
(Portugal) 2024	12th
(Spain) 2025	13th
(Sweden) 2026	13th
Total	19/41

== See also ==
- Men's
  - Turkey Men's national basketball team
  - Turkey Men's national basketball team U20
  - Turkey Men's national basketball team U18 and U19
  - Turkey Men's national basketball team U16 and U17
  - Turkey Men's national 3x3 team
- Women's
  - Turkey Women's national basketball team
  - Turkey Women's national basketball team U20
  - Turkey Women's national basketball team U18 and U19
  - Turkey Women's national basketball team U16 and U17
  - Turkey Women's national 3x3 team
