= Germany women's national under-18 and under-19 basketball team =

German youth basketball team

Germany
- FIBA zone: FIBA Europe
- National federation: German Basketball Federation

U19 World Cup
- Appearances: 2
- Medals: None

U18 EuroBasket
- Appearances: 21
- Medals: (gold) Gold: 1 (2018)

U18 EuroBasket Division B
- Appearances: 11
- Medals: (gold) Gold: 1 (2017); (silver) Silver: 1 (2025); (bronze) Bronze: 1 (2009)
Home	Away

The Germany women's national under-18 and under-19 basketball team is a national basketball team of Germany, administered by the German Basketball Federation (German: Deutscher Basketball Bund e.V.), abbreviated as DBB. It represents the country in under-18 and under-19 women's international basketball competitions.

== FIBA U18 Women's EuroBasket participations ==
Year	Division A
1965	11th
1967	11th
1969	11th
1973	10th
1975	11th
1983	10th
1984	10th
1986	8th
1988	12th
1990	10th
1996	8th
2000	7th
2004	12th
2005	9th
2006	12th
2007	15th

Year	Division A	Division B
2008		8th
2009		3rd place, bronze medalist(s)
2010		9th
2011		9th
2012		8th
2013		9th
2014		10th
2015		5th
2016		7th
2017		1st place, gold medalist(s)
2018	1st place, gold medalist(s)	
2019	6th	
2022	4th	
2023	11th	
2024	15th	
2025		2nd place, silver medalist(s)

== FIBA Under-19 Women's Basketball World Cup participations ==
Year	Result
2019	13th
2023	10th

== See also ==
- Germany women's national basketball team
- Germany women's national under-17 basketball team
- Germany men's national under-19 basketball team
