= Latvia women's national under-18 and under-19 basketball team =

Latvia
- FIBA zone: FIBA Europe
- National federation: Latvian Basketball Association

U19 World Cup
- Appearances: 2
- Medals: None

U18 EuroBasket
- Appearances: 12
- Medals: None

U18 EuroBasket Division B
- Appearances: 9
- Medals: (gold) Gold: 1 (2008); (silver) Silver: 1 (2015); (bronze) Bronze: 2 (2005, 2011)
Home	Away

The Latvia women's national under-18 and under-19 basketball team is a national basketball team of Latvia, administered by the Latvian Basketball Association. It represents the country in under-18 and under-19 women's international basketball competitions.

== FIBA U18 Women's EuroBasket participations ==
Year	Division A	Division B
1998	12th	
2000	10th	
2005		3rd place, bronze medalist(s)
2006		4th
2007		4th
2008		1st place, gold medalist(s)
2009	7th	
2010	16th	
2011		3rd place, bronze medalist(s)
2012		9th
2013		4th

Year	Division A	Division B
2014		4th
2015		2nd place, silver medalist(s)
2016	4th	
2017	13th	
2018	4th	
2019	7th	
2022	9th	
2023	8th	
2024	10th	
2025	10th	

== FIBA Under-19 Women's Basketball World Cup participations ==
Year	Result
2017	10th
2019	14th

== See also ==
- Latvia women's national basketball team
- Latvia women's national under-17 basketball team
- Latvia men's national under-19 basketball team
