= Netherlands women's national under-18 and under-19 basketball team =

Netherlands
- FIBA zone: FIBA Europe
- National federation: Basketball Nederland

U19 World Cup
- Appearances: 2
- Medals: None

U18 EuroBasket
- Appearances: 13
- Medals: None

U18 EuroBasket Division B
- Appearances: 12
- Medals: (silver) Silver: 1 (2010)

The Netherlands women's national under-18 and under-19 basketball team is a national youth basketball team of the Netherlands, administered by Basketball Nederland. It represents the country in under-18 and under-19 women's international basketball competitions.

== FIBA U18 Women's EuroBasket participations ==
Year	Division A	Division B
1969	10th	
1971	10th	
1973	7th	
1979	11th	
1981	12th	
1984	9th	
1986	7th	
2005		14th
2007		11th
2008		6th
2009		13th
2010		2nd place, silver medalist(s)
2011	5th	

Year	Division A	Division B
2012	4th	
2013	4th	
2014	6th	
2015	8th	
2016	16th	
2017		11th
2018		6th
2019		7th
2022		6th
2023		9th
2024		11th
2025		7th

== FIBA Under-19 Women's Basketball World Cup participations ==
Year	Result
2013	10th
2015	9th

== See also ==
- Netherlands women's national basketball team
- Netherlands women's national under-20 basketball team
- Netherlands women's national under-17 basketball team
- Netherlands men's national under-18 basketball team
