= Croatia women's national under-18 basketball team =

Croatia
- FIBA zone: FIBA Europe
- National federation: Croatian Basketball Federation

U19 World Cup
- Appearances: None

U18 EuroBasket
- Appearances: 13
- Medals: None

U18 EuroBasket Division B
- Appearances: 8
- Medals: (gold) Gold: 3 (2007, 2011, 2023); (bronze) Bronze: 1 (2006, 2025)

The Croatia women's national under-18 basketball team is a national basketball team of Croatia, administered by the Croatian Basketball Federation. It represents the country in under-18 women's international basketball competitions.

== FIBA U18 Women's EuroBasket participations ==
Year	Division A	Division B
1998	8th	
2002	8th	
2005	15th	
2006		3rd place, bronze medalist(s)
2007		1st place, gold medalist(s)
2008	16th	
2009		11th
2010		5th
2011		1st place, gold medalist(s)
2012	7th	
2013	13th	

Year	Division A	Division B
2014	8th	
2015	9th	
2016	12th	
2017	9th	
2018	9th	
2019	15th	
2022		5th
2023		1st place, gold medalist(s)
2024	14th	
2025		3rd place, bronze medalist(s)

== See also ==
- Croatia women's national basketball team
- Croatia women's national under-16 basketball team
- Croatia men's national under-18 and under-19 basketball team
