= Hungary women's national under-18 and under-19 basketball team =

Hungary
- FIBA zone: FIBA Europe
- National federation: Hungarian Basketball Federation

U19 World Cup
- Appearances: 5
- Medals: (bronze) Bronze: 1 (2021)

U18 EuroBasket
- Appearances: 31
- Medals: (silver) Silver: 2 (1979, 2019); (bronze) Bronze: 3 (1994, 2004, 2018)

U18 EuroBasket Division B
- Appearances: 6
- Medals: (gold) Gold: 2 (2009, 2014)
Home	Away

The Hungary women's national under-18 and under-19 basketball team is a national basketball team of Hungary, administered by the Magyar Kosárlabdázók Országos Szövetsége. It represents the country in under-18 and under-19 women's international basketball competitions.

== Results ==
=== FIBA Under-19 Women's Basketball World Cup ===
Year	Result
2005	8th
2017	9th
2019	10th
2021	3rd place, bronze medalist(s)
2025	8th

=== FIBA U18 Women's EuroBasket ===
Year	Division A
1965	6th
1967	6th
1969	5th
1971	7th
1973	6th
1975	5th
1977	5th
1979	2nd place, silver medalist(s)
1981	4th
1983	6th
1984	8th
1986	9th
1988	11th

Year	Division A	Division B
1990	9th	
1992	7th	
1994	3rd place, bronze medalist(s)	
1996	6th	
2004	3rd place, bronze medalist(s)	
2005	6th	
2006	7th	
2007	16th	
2008		7th
2009		1st place, gold medalist(s)
2010	15th	
2011		5th
2012		4th

Year	Division A	Division B
2013		8th
2014		1st place, gold medalist(s)
2015	13th	
2016	5th	
2017	5th	
2018	3rd place, bronze medalist(s)	
2019	2nd place, silver medalist(s)	
2022	11th	
2023	5th	
2024	6th	
2025	9th	

== See also ==
- Hungary women's national basketball team
- Hungary women's national under-17 basketball team
- Hungary men's national under-19 basketball team
