= Poland women's national under-18 and under-19 basketball team =

Poland
- FIBA zone: FIBA Europe
- National federation: Polish Basketball Federation

U19 World Cup
- Appearances: 2
- Medals: (bronze) Bronze: 1 (1993)

U18 EuroBasket
- Appearances: 35
- Medals: (silver) Silver: 2 (1975, 1977); (bronze) Bronze: 2 (1992, 2000)

U18 EuroBasket Division B
- Appearances: 3
- Medals: (gold) Gold: 1 (2013); (bronze) Bronze: 1 (2017)
Home	Away

The Poland women's national under-18 and under-19 basketball team is a national basketball team of Poland, administered by the Polski Zwiazek Koszykówki. It represents the country in under-18 and under-19 women's international basketball competitions.

== FIBA U18 Women's EuroBasket participations ==
Year	Division A
1965	4th
1967	5th
1969	4th
1971	6th
1973	5th
1975	2nd place, silver medalist(s)
1977	2nd place, silver medalist(s)
1979	9th
1981	11th
1983	11th
1984	12th
1986	4th
1988	8th

Year	Division A
1990	11th
1992	3rd place, bronze medalist(s)
1994	12th
1998	6th
2000	3rd place, bronze medalist(s)
2002	6th
2005	13th
2006	14th
2007	4th
2008	8th
2009	12th
2010	11th
2011	6th

Year	Division A	Division B
2012	14th	
2013		1st place, gold medalist(s)
2014	12th	
2015	14th	
2016		6th
2017		3rd place, bronze medalist(s)
2018	11th	
2019	10th	
2022	8th	
2023	7th	
2024	11th	
2025	5th	

== FIBA Under-19 Women's Basketball World Cup participations ==
Year	Result
1993	3rd place, bronze medalist(s)
2001	10th

== See also ==
- Poland women's national basketball team
- Poland women's national under-17 basketball team
- Poland men's national under-19 basketball team
