= Greece women's national under-18 basketball team =

Greece
- FIBA zone: FIBA Europe
- National federation: Hellenic Basketball Federation

U19 World Cup
- Appearances: None

U18 EuroBasket
- Appearances: 14
- Medals: None

U18 EuroBasket Division B
- Appearances: 11
- Medals: (silver) Silver: 3 (2011, 2016, 2019); (bronze) Bronze: 3 (2010, 2023, 2024)

The Greece women's national under-18 basketball team is a national basketball team of Greece, administered by the Hellenic Basketball Federation. It represents the country in under-18 women's international basketball competitions.

== FIBA U18 Women's EuroBasket participations ==
Year	Division A	Division B
1990	12th	
1992	10th	
1994	9th	
1996	5th	
2000	8th	
2002	7th	
2005	14th	
2006	16th	
2007		5th
2008		4th
2009		7th
2010		3rd place, bronze medalist(s)
2011		2nd place, silver medalist(s)

Year	Division A	Division B
2012	11th	
2013	10th	
2014	14th	
2015		10th
2016		2nd place, silver medalist(s)
2017	16th	
2018		11th
2019		2nd place, silver medalist(s)
2022	14th	
2023		3rd place, bronze medalist(s)
2024		3rd place, bronze medalist(s)
2025	14th	
2026		6th

== See also ==
- Greece women's national basketball team
- Greece women's national under-16 basketball team
- Greece men's national under-18 basketball team
