= Czech Republic women's national under-18 and under-19 basketball team =

Czech Republic
- FIBA zone: FIBA Europe
- National federation: Czech Basketball Federation

U19 World Cup
- Appearances: 7
- Medals: (gold) Gold: 1 (2001)

U18 EuroBasket
- Appearances: 23
- Medals: (silver) Silver: 1 (2000); (bronze) Bronze: 3 (1996, 2002, 2008)

U18 EuroBasket Division B
- Appearances: 1
- Medals: (silver) Silver: 1 (2024)

The Czech Republic women's national under-18 and under-19 basketball team is a national basketball team of the Czech Republic, administered by the Czech Basketball Federation. It represents the country in under-18 and under-19 women's international basketball competitions.

== Results ==
=== FIBA Under-19 Women's Basketball World Cup ===
Year	Pos.	Pld	W	L
(Brazil) 1997	6th	7	4	3
(Czech Republic) 2001	1st place, gold medalist(s)	7	6	1
(Tunisia) 2005	Did not qualify			
(Slovakia) 2007	7th	9	4	5
(Thailand) 2009	10th	8	4	4
(Chile) 2011	Did not qualify			
(Lithuania) 2013	Did not qualify			
(Russia) 2015	Did not qualify			
(Italy) 2017	Did not qualify			
(Thailand) 2019	Did not qualify			
(Hungary) 2021	6th	7	4	3
(Spain) 2023	7th	7	4	3
(Czech Republic) 2025	13th	6	2	4
(China) 2027	Did not qualify			
Total	7/14	51	28	23

=== FIBA U18 Women's EuroBasket ===
Year	Division A
1994	10th
1996	3rd place, bronze medalist(s)
1998	4th
2000	2nd place, silver medalist(s)
2002	3rd place, bronze medalist(s)
2005	4th
2006	4th
2007	6th
2008	3rd place, bronze medalist(s)
2009	4th
2010	14th
2011	9th

Year	Division A	Division B
2012	13th	
2013	11th	
2014	11th	
2015	6th	
2016	13th	
2017	4th	
2018	6th	
2019	8th	
2022	6th	
2023	14th	
2024		2nd place, silver medalist(s)
2025	11th	

== See also ==
- Czech Republic women's national basketball team
- Czech Republic women's national under-17 basketball team
- Czech Republic men's national under-19 basketball team
