= Romania women's national under-18 basketball team =

Romania
- FIBA zone: FIBA Europe
- National federation: Romanian Basketball Federation

U19 World Cup
- Appearances: None

U18 EuroBasket
- Appearances: 13
- Medals: (bronze) Bronze: 1 (1990)

U18 EuroBasket Division B
- Appearances: 16
- Medals: (gold) Gold: 1 (2010); (silver) Silver: 2 (2007, 2026)

The Romania women's national under-18 basketball team is a national basketball team of Romania, administered by the Romanian Basketball Federation. It represents the country in under-18 women's international basketball competitions.

== FIBA U18 Women's EuroBasket participations ==
Year	Division A	Division B
1965	7th	
1967	8th	
1969	9th	
1977	6th	
1979	6th	
1986	5th	
1990	3rd place, bronze medalist(s)	
1992	8th	
1994	7th	
2002	12th	
2005		15th
2006		8th
2007		2nd place, silver medalist(s)
2008	15th	
2009		10th

Year	Division A	Division B
2010		1st place, gold medalist(s)
2011	12th	
2012	16th	
2013		13th
2014		12th
2015		6th
2016		17th
2017		8th
2018		9th
2019		8th
2022		7th
2023		17th
2024		13th
2025		13th
2026		2nd place, silver medalist(s)

== See also ==
- Romania women's national basketball team
- Romania women's national under-17 basketball team
- Romania men's national under-19 basketball team
