= 2016 FIBA U18 Women's European Championship =

33rd FIBA Under-18 Women's European Basketball Championship

Tournament details
- Host country: Hungary
- Dates: 23–31 July 2016
- Teams: 16
- Venue: 2 (in 1 host city)

Final positions
- Champions: France (2nd title)

Tournament statistics
- MVP: (France) Alexia Chartereau
- Top scorer: (Russia) Musina (18.0)
- Top rebounds: (Russia) Musina (15.5)
- Top assists: (Hungary) Lelik (5.6)
- PPG (Team): (France) (69.7)
- RPG (Team): (France) (46.4)
- APG (Team): (Hungary) (17.7)

Official website
- www.fiba.basketball

The 2016 FIBA U18 Women's European Championship was an international basketball competition held in Sopron, Hungary, from 23 to 31 July 2016. It was the 33rd edition of the championship, and the FIBA Europe qualifying tournament for the 2017 FIBA Under-19 Women's Basketball World Cup. 16 national teams from across Europe, composed of women aged 18 and under, competed in the tournament.

== Venues ==
- Novomatic Aréna I, Sopron
- Novomatic Aréna II, Sopron

== Participating teams ==
- Hungary (hosts)
- Belgium
- Croatia
- Czech Republic
- France
- Israel
- Italy
- Latvia ▲ (Runners-up, 2015 FIBA Europe Under-18 Championship for Women Division B)
- Lithuania
- Netherlands
- Russia
- Serbia
- Slovakia ▲ (Winners, 2015 FIBA Europe Under-18 Championship for Women Division B)
- Slovenia
- Spain
- Turkey ▲ (Third place, 2015 FIBA Europe Under-18 Championship for Women Division B)

== First round ==
The first-round groups draw took place on 22 January 2016 in Munich, Germany.

All times are local – Central European Summer Time (UTC+2).

=== Group A ===
Pos	Team	Pld	W	L	PF	PA	PD	Pts
1	Latvia	3	3	0	197	144	+53	6
2	Czech Republic	3	2	1	176	166	+10	5
3	Slovakia	3	1	2	169	176	−7	4
4	Netherlands	3	0	3	144	200	−56	3

Source: FIBA

23 July
13:00

Boxscore

Latvia	66–35	Netherlands
Scoring by quarter: 17–10, 21–10, 16–7, 12–8
Pts: Strautmane 16; Rebs: Strautmane 10; Asts: 7 players 1		Pts: Dekker 7 Rebs: Droste 6 Asts: Van Vlijmen, Tamis 2

Novomatic Aréna II, Sopron

23 July
18:00

Boxscore

Slovakia	44–58	Czech Republic
Scoring by quarter: 15–20, 7–14, 4–8, 18–16
Pts: Kovacikova, Tarkovicova 9 Rebs: Dubenova, Mikulasikova 5 Asts: Bilikova 2		Pts: Stopaulova, Krejzova 16; Rebs: Stopaulova 9 Asts: Zilkova 3

Novomatic Aréna II, Sopron

24 July
13:30

Boxscore

Czech Republic	53–74	Latvia
Scoring by quarter: 12–16, 19–18, 8–13, 14–27
Pts: Krejzova 9 Rebs: Herinkova 6 Asts: Gallasova 4		Pts: Strautmane 17; Rebs: Strautmane 10; Asts: Septe 4

Novomatic Aréna, Sopron

24 July
20:15

Boxscore

Netherlands	61–69 (OT)	Slovakia
Scoring by quarter: 26–14, 12–17, 10–11, 10–16, Overtime: 3–11
Pts: Kuijt 14; Rebs: Slagter 7 Asts: Van Vlijmen 4		Pts: Lelkes 17; Rebs: Mikulasikova 20; Asts: Lelkes 5

Novomatic Aréna, Sopron

26 July
15:15

Boxscore

Slovakia	56–57	Latvia
Scoring by quarter: 11–17, 17–18, 11–10, 17–12
Pts: Mikulasikova, Kovacikova 13; Rebs: Mikulasikova 15; Asts: Feherova 3		Pts: Strautmane 13; Rebs: Strautmane 9 Asts: Septe 3

Novomatic Aréna II, Sopron
Attendance: 200

26 July
17:30

Boxscore

Netherlands	48–65	Czech Republic
Scoring by quarter: 9–16, 12–19, 21–13, 6–17

Novomatic Aréna II, Sopron
Attendance: 150

=== Group B ===
Pos	Team	Pld	W	L	PF	PA	PD	Pts
1	Russia	3	3	0	214	168	+46	6
2	Italy	3	2	1	172	159	+13	5
3	Turkey	3	1	2	208	183	+25	4
4	Israel	3	0	3	141	225	−84	3

Source: FIBA

23 July
15:15

Boxscore

Turkey	80–43	Israel
Scoring by quarter: 21–8, 16–7, 29–9, 14–19
Pts: Kepenc 17; Rebs: Yildizhan 10; Asts: Sahin 4		Pts: Saar 10; Rebs: 3 players 4 Asts: Yizchaki 3

Novomatic Aréna II, Sopron

23 July
20:30

Boxscore

Italy	49–52	Russia
Scoring by quarter: 9–13, 11–10, 17–12, 12–17
Pts: Cubaj 14; Rebs: Castello 8 Asts: Pinzan 3		Pts: Ogun, Musina 13; Rebs: Musina 17; Asts: Ogun 4

Novomatic Aréna II, Sopron

24 July
15:45

Boxscore

Russia	81–70 (OT)	Turkey
Scoring by quarter: 13–22, 21–17, 16–14, 18–15, Overtime: 13–2
Pts: Musina 26; Rebs: Musina 21; Asts: Nuritdinova 6		Pts: Guclu 18; Rebs: Yildizhan, Guclu 9 Asts: Yildizhan 4

Novomatic Aréna, Sopron

24 July
17:30

Boxscore

Israel	49–64	Italy
Scoring by quarter: 18–10, 16–22, 6–18, 9–14
Pts: Rotberg 13; Rebs: Yizchaki, Sirkis 6 Asts: Saar 4		Pts: Pinzan 15; Rebs: Castello 12; Asts: 3 players 3

Novomatic Aréna II, Sopron

26 July
13:00

Boxscore

Italy	59–58	Turkey
Scoring by quarter: 18–24, 14–15, 16–7, 11–12
Pts: Togliani 16; Rebs: Castello 7 Asts: Cubaj, Bacchini 3		Pts: Guclu 12; Rebs: Yildizhan 8 Asts: Yildizhan 4

Novomatic Aréna II, Sopron
Attendance: 100

26 July
19:45

Boxscore

Israel	49–81	Russia
Scoring by quarter: 13–23, 11–20, 11–21, 14–17

Novomatic Aréna II, Sopron

=== Group C ===
Pos	Team	Pld	W	L	PF	PA	PD	Pts
1	Spain	3	2	1	209	173	+36	5
2	Belgium	3	2	1	185	178	+7	5
3	Serbia	3	1	2	183	209	−26	4
4	Lithuania	3	1	2	183	200	−17	4

Source: FIBA

23 July
13:00

Boxscore

Belgium	71–56	Lithuania
Scoring by quarter: 21–21, 20–7, 18–14, 12–14
Pts: Resimont, Massey 14; Rebs: Devos 11; Asts: Massey 5		Pts: Knyzaite 16; Rebs: Meskonyte 9 Asts: Meskonyte, Knyzaite 3

Novomatic Aréna, Sopron

23 July
20:30

Boxscore

Serbia	65–76	Spain
Scoring by quarter: 16–19, 9–24, 24–20, 16–13
Pts: Katanic, Turudic 16; Rebs: Djordjevic 4 Asts: Stojiljkovic 4		Pts: Ginzo, Iparragirre 12; Rebs: Ginzo 5 Asts: Gonzalez 4

Novomatic Aréna, Sopron

24 July
15:15

Boxscore

Spain	70–40	Belgium
Scoring by quarter: 18–12, 19–10, 10–9, 23–9
Pts: Caceres 15; Rebs: Ginzo 7 Asts: Alonso 3		Pts: Henket 16; Rebs: Massey 6 Asts: Henket 2

Novomatic Aréna II, Sopron

24 July
19:45

Boxscore

Lithuania	59–66	Serbia
Scoring by quarter: 14–11, 18–18, 10–22, 17–15
Pts: Meskonyte 20; Rebs: Petrenaite 10; Asts: 3 players 3		Pts: Naumcev 15; Rebs: Naumcev 10; Asts: Katanic 5

Novomatic Aréna II, Sopron

26 July
13:30

Boxscore

Lithuania	68–63	Spain
Scoring by quarter: 13–9, 26–20, 15–19, 14–15
Pts: Serkeviciute 15; Rebs: Meskonyte 9 Asts: Kaktaite 4		Pts: Etxarri Munarriz 12; Rebs: Caceres 6 Asts: Caceres 5

Novomatic Aréna, Sopron
Attendance: 100

26 July
15:45

Boxscore

Serbia	52–74	Belgium
Scoring by quarter: 13–20, 14–24, 14–13, 11–17

Novomatic Aréna, Sopron
Attendance: 100

=== Group D ===
Pos	Team	Pld	W	L	PF	PA	PD	Pts
1	France	3	3	0	248	144	+104	6
2	Hungary	3	2	1	215	190	+25	5
3	Croatia	3	1	2	175	219	−44	4
4	Slovenia	3	0	3	148	233	−85	3

Source: FIBA

23 July
15:15

Boxscore

Croatia	37–88	France
Scoring by quarter: 14–24, 5–21, 11–20, 7–23
Pts: Erjavec 9 Rebs: Simunic, Molnar 4 Asts: 3 players 2		Pts: Chartereau 13; Rebs: Djaldi-Tabdi 8 Asts: Lenglet 4

Novomatic Aréna, Sopron

23 July
18:15

Boxscore

Hungary	77–48	Slovenia
Scoring by quarter: 21–11, 19–16, 15–14, 22–7
Pts: Juhasz 17; Rebs: Torok 8 Asts: Lelik 8		Pts: Kroselj, Prevodnik 11; Rebs: Einfalt, Jesensek 5 Asts: Kroselj 4

Novomatic Aréna, Sopron

24 July
13:00

Boxscore

Slovenia	58–72	Croatia
Scoring by quarter: 14–21, 13–12, 8–16, 23–23
Pts: Kroselj 27; Rebs: Einfalt 5 Asts: Cvijanovic 4		Pts: Silov 18; Rebs: Pavic 10; Asts: Pavic 3

Novomatic Aréna II, Sopron

24 July
18:00

Boxscore

France	76–65	Hungary
Scoring by quarter: 24–23, 11–14, 18–14, 23–14
Pts: Chartereau 19; Rebs: Djekoundade 8 Asts: Pouye 4		Pts: Lelik 22; Rebs: Juhasz 9 Asts: Lelik 6

Novomatic Aréna, Sopron

26 July
18:00

Boxscore

Croatia	66–73	Hungary
Scoring by quarter: 12–11, 16–15, 22–16, 16–31
Pts: Silov 20; Rebs: Molnar 6 Asts: Tadic 4		Pts: Juhasz 24; Rebs: Torok 13; Asts: Torok 8

Novomatic Aréna, Sopron
Attendance: 500

26 July
20:15

Boxscore

Slovenia	42–84	France
Scoring by quarter: 9–20, 9–16, 7–25, 17–23
Pts: Zoran 16; Rebs: Jesensek 5 Asts: Prevodnik 6		Pts: Michaud 16; Rebs: Djekoundade, Djaldi-Tabdi 9 Asts: Djaldi-Tabdi, Lenglet 5

Novomatic Aréna, Sopron
Attendance: 50

== Knockout stage ==
=== Bracket ===
Round of 16
27 July
Latvia	59
Israel	56
27 July
Belgium	61
Croatia	59
27 July
Italy	44
Slovakia	31
27 July
France	53
Lithuania	51
27 July
Czech Republic	56
Turkey	60
27 July
Spain	69
Slovenia	42
27 July
Russia	82
Netherlands	50
27 July
Hungary	69
Serbia	53

Quarter-finals
29 July
Latvia	55
Belgium	52
29 July
Italy	52
France	60
29 July
Turkey	57
Spain	67
29 July
Russia	64
Hungary	61

Semi-finals
30 July
Latvia	44
France	53
30 July
Spain	71
Russia	55

Final
31 July
France	74
Spain	44
Third place
31 July
Latvia	58
Russia	65

== Classification playoffs ==
=== 5th–8th place bracket ===
5th-8th place semifinals
30 July
Belgium	64
Italy	59
30 July
Turkey	60
Hungary	77

5th place game
31 July
Belgium	54
Hungary	64
7th place game
31 July
Italy	57
Turkey	34

=== 9th–16th place bracket ===
- Loser of the 13th place game will also be relegated to the 2017 FIBA Europe Under-18 Championship Division B.
- Participants of the 15th place game will be relegated to Euro U-18 Division B.

13th place game (31 July)
Israel	84
Czech Republic	87
15th place game (31 July)
Slovakia	73
Netherlands	68

13th-16th place semifinals (30 July)
Israel	66
Slovakia	64
Czech Republic	74
Netherlands	73

9th-16th place quarterfinals (29 July)
Israel	68
Croatia	76
Slovakia	56
Lithuania	58
Czech Republic	52
Slovenia	60
Serbia	73
Netherlands	58

9th-12th place semifinals (30 July)
Croatia	47
Lithuania	63
Slovenia	58
Serbia	51

9th place game (31 July)
Lithuania	82
Slovenia	63
11th place game (31 July)
Croatia	43
Serbia	85

All times are local (UTC+2).

=== Round of 16 ===
27 July 2016
13:00

Czech Republic	56–60	Turkey
Scoring by quarter: 10–22, 12–16, 16–16, 18–6

Novomatic Aréna II, Sopron
Attendance: 100

27 July 2016
13:30

Belgium	61–59	Croatia
Scoring by quarter: 24–17, 12–18, 12–13, 13–11

Novomatic Aréna, Sopron
Attendance: 50

27 July 2016
15:15

Spain	69–42	Slovenia
Scoring by quarter: 22–13, 7–4, 21–17, 19–8

Novomatic Aréna II, Sopron
Attendance: 100

27 July 2016
15:45

Latvia	59–56	Israel
Scoring by quarter: 11–15, 15–13, 20–17, 13–11

Novomatic Aréna, Sopron
Attendance: 150

27 July 2016
17:30

Italy	44–31	Slovakia
Scoring by quarter: 8–14, 13–4, 16–5, 7–8

Novomatic Aréna II, Sopron
Attendance: 100

27 July 2016
18:00

Hungary	69–53	Serbia
Scoring by quarter: 22–10, 19–10, 15–18, 13–15

Novomatic Aréna, Sopron
Attendance: 400

27 July 2016
19:45

France	53–51	Lithuania
Scoring by quarter: 11–12, 19–10, 14–16, 9–13

Novomatic Aréna II, Sopron
Attendance: 150

27 July 2016
20:15

Russia	82–50	Netherlands
Scoring by quarter: 31–13, 18–12, 13–8, 20–17

Novomatic Aréna, Sopron
Attendance: 100

=== 9th–16th place quarterfinals ===
29 July 2016
13:00

Israel	68–76	Croatia
Scoring by quarter: 18-14, 13-25, 12-15, 25-22

Sopron

29 July 2016
15:15

Czech Republic	56–58	Slovenia
Scoring by quarter: 14.14, 14-10, 9-15, 19-19

Sopron

29 July 2016
17:30

Slovakia	52–60	Lithuania
Scoring by quarter: 11-16, 11-14, 18-15, 12-15

Sopron

29 July 2015
19:45

Netherlands	58–73	Serbia
Scoring by quarter: 13-17, 8-15, 23-24, 14-17

Sopron

=== Quarterfinals ===
29 July 2016
13:30

Latvia	55–52	Belgium
Scoring by quarter: 20-15, 6-8, 11-21, 18-8

Sopron

29 July 2016
15:45

Turkey	57–67	Spain
Scoring by quarter: 11-22, 11-10, 25-22, 10-13

Sopron

29 July 2016
18:00

Italy	52–60	France
Scoring by quarter: 14-11, 11-18, 15-15, 12-16

Sopron

29 July 2016
20:15

Russia	64–61	Hungary
Scoring by quarter: 12-16, 20-23, 15-13, 17-9

Sopron

=== 13th–16th place semifinals ===
30 July 2016
13:00

Boxscore

Israel	69–64	Slovakia
Scoring by quarter: 16–19, 21–14, 17–13, 15–18

Sopron
Attendance: 100

30 July 2016
15:15

Boxscore

Czech Republic	74–73	Netherlands
Scoring by quarter: 16–22, 23–19, 18–18, 17–14

Sopron
Attendance: 100

=== 9th–12th place semifinals ===
30 July 2016
17:30

Boxscore

Croatia	47–63	Lithuania
Scoring by quarter: 13–14, 14–20, 15–13, 5–16

Sopron
Attendance: 70

30 July 2016
19:45

Boxscore

Slovenia	58–51	Serbia
Scoring by quarter: 14–9, 10–17, 15–15, 19–10

Sopron
Attendance: 60

=== 5th–8th place semifinals ===
30 July 2016
13:30

Boxscore

Turkey	60–77	Hungary
Scoring by quarter: 14–21, 9–23, 20–19, 17–14

Sopron
Attendance: 200

30 July 2016
15:45

Boxscore

Belgium	64–59 (OT)	Italy
Scoring by quarter: 12–11, 7–8, 18–10, 18–26, Overtime: 9–4

Sopron
Attendance: 200

=== Semifinals ===
30 July 2016
18:00

Boxscore

Latvia	44–53	France
Scoring by quarter: 5–13, 18–11, 11–14, 10–15

Sopron
Attendance: 250

30 July 2016
20:15

Boxscore

Spain	71–55	Russia
Scoring by quarter: 12–14, 29–15, 13–15, 17–11

Sopron
Attendance: 400

=== Final classification games ===
==== Match for 15th place ====
31 July 2016
11:00

Boxscore

Slovakia	73–68	Netherlands
Scoring by quarter: 19–14, 24–14, 18–24, 12–16

Novomatic Aréna II, Sopron
Attendance: 70

==== Match for 13th place ====
31 July 2016
13:15

Boxscore

Israel	84–87 (OT)	Czech Republic
Scoring by quarter: 18–24, 21–16, 17–14, 19–21, Overtime: 9–12

Novomatic Aréna II, Sopron
Attendance: 140

==== Match for 11th place ====
31 July 2016
15:30

Boxscore

Croatia	43–85	Serbia
Scoring by quarter: 6–19, 16–26, 9–22, 12–18

Novomatic Aréna II, Sopron
Attendance: 20

==== Match for 9th place ====
31 July 2016
17:45

Boxscore

Lithuania	82–63	Slovenia
Scoring by quarter: 17–4, 30–16, 21–21, 14–22

Novomatic Aréna II, Sopron
Attendance: 50

==== Match for 7th place ====
31 July 2016
13:30

Boxscore

Italy	57–34	Turkey
Scoring by quarter: 16–11, 11–13, 19–3, 11–7

Novomatic Aréna, Sopron
Attendance: 150

==== Match for 5th place ====
31 July 2016
15:45

Boxscore

Belgium	54–64	Hungary
Scoring by quarter: 9–13, 18–13, 16–24, 11–14

Novomatic Aréna, Sopron
Attendance: 700

==== Bronze medal match ====
31 July 2016
18:00

Boxscore

Latvia	58–65	Russia
Scoring by quarter: 8–13, 19–12, 11–15, 20–25

Novomatic Aréna, Sopron
Attendance: 350

==== Final ====
31 July 2016
20:15

Boxscore

France	74–44	Spain
Scoring by quarter: 19–9, 13–10, 13–15, 29–10

Novomatic Aréna, Sopron
Attendance: 700
Referees: Ognjen Jokić (MNE), Sergey Mikhaylov (RUS), Jelena Smiljanic (SRB)

== Awards ==
2016 FIBA Europe Under-18 Championship for Women
Winners

France
Second title

Most Valuable Player
Alexia Chartereau

=== All-Tournament Team ===
- PG- Réka Lelik
- SG- Naira Caceres
- SF- Alexia Chartereau
- PF- Digna Strautmane
- C- Raisa Musina

== Final standings ==
Rank	Team	Record
1st place, gold medalist(s)	France	7–0
2nd place, silver medalist(s)	Spain	5–2
3rd place, bronze medalist(s)	Russia	6–1
4	Latvia	5–2
5	Hungary	5–2
6	Belgium	4–3
7	Italy	4–3
8	Turkey	2–5
9	Lithuania	4–3
10	Slovenia	2–5
11	Serbia	3–4
12	Croatia	2–5
13	Czech Republic	4–3
14	Israel	1–6
15	Slovakia	2–5
16	Netherlands	0–7

Qualified for the 2017 FIBA Under-19 Women's Basketball World Cup
Relegated to the 2017 FIBA U16 Women's European Championship Division B
