= Ireland women's national under-18 basketball team =

Ireland
- FIBA zone: FIBA Europe
- National federation: Basketball Ireland

U19 World Cup
- Appearances: None

U18 EuroBasket
- Appearances: 1
- Medals: None

U18 EuroBasket Division B
- Appearances: 13
- Medals: (silver) Silver: 1 (2017)

U18 EuroBasket Division C
- Appearances: 1
- Medals: (gold) Gold: 1 (1997)

The Ireland women's national under-18 basketball team is a national basketball team of the Island of Ireland, administered by Basketball Ireland. It represents the country in under-18 women's international basketball competitions.

== FIBA U18 Women's EuroBasket participations ==
Year	Division A	Division B	Division C
1997			1st place, gold medalist(s)
2005		12th	
2006		10th	
2007		8th	
2008		11th	
2014		13th	
2015		18th	
2016		8th	

Year	Division A	Division B	Division C
2017		2nd place, silver medalist(s)	
2018	14th		
2019		9th	
2022		9th	
2023		6th	
2024		9th	
2025		14th	

== See also ==
- Ireland women's national basketball team
- Ireland women's national under-16 basketball team
- Ireland men's national under-18 basketball team
