= Portugal women's national under-18 basketball team =

Portugal
- FIBA zone: FIBA Europe
- National federation: Portuguese Basketball Federation

U19 World Cup
- Appearances: 1
- Medals: None

U18 EuroBasket
- Appearances: 6
- Medals: None

U18 EuroBasket Division B
- Appearances: 13
- Medals: (silver) Silver: 1 (2022); (bronze) Bronze: 1 (2012)

The Portugal women's national under-18 and under-19 basketball team is a national basketball team of Portugal, administered by the Portuguese Basketball Federation. It represents the country in under-18 and under-19 women's international basketball competitions.

== Results ==
=== FIBA Under-19 Women's Basketball World Cup ===
Year	Result
2025	7th

=== FIBA U18 Women's EuroBasket ===
Year	Division A	Division B
2005		7th
2006		9th
2007		14th
2008		10th
2009		5th
2010		11th
2011		7th
2012		3rd place, bronze medalist(s)
2013	9th	
2014	9th	

Year	Division A	Division B
2015	15th	
2016		9th
2017		5th
2018		5th
2019		6th
2022		2nd place, silver medalist(s)
2023	15th	
2024	5th	
2025	15th	

== See also ==
- Portugal women's national basketball team
- Portugal women's national under-17 basketball team
- Portugal men's national under-19 basketball team
