= Slovakia women's national under-18 and under-19 basketball team =

Slovakia
- FIBA zone: FIBA Europe
- National federation: Slovak Basketball Association

U19 World Cup
- Appearances: 2
- Medals: (bronze) Bronze: 1 (1997)

U18 EuroBasket
- Appearances: 16
- Medals: (silver) Silver: 2 (1996, 1998)

U18 EuroBasket Division B
- Appearances: 8
- Medals: (gold) Gold: 1 (2015)
Home	Away

The Slovakia women's national under-18 and under-19 basketball team is a national basketball team of Slovakia, administered by the Slovak Basketball Association. It represents the country in under-18 and under-19 women's international basketball competitions.

== FIBA U18 Women's EuroBasket participations ==
Year	Division A	Division B
1994	6th	
1996	2nd place, silver medalist(s)	
1998	2nd place, silver medalist(s)	
2000	12th	
2002	4th	
2004	11th	
2005	8th	
2006	13th	
2007	9th	
2008	7th	
2009	14th	
2010	9th	

Year	Division A	Division B
2011	14th	
2012	9th	
2013	14th	
2015		1st place, gold medalist(s)
2016	15th	
2017		12th
2018		14th
2019		10th
2022		4th
2023		5th
2024		7th
2025		9th

== FIBA Under-19 Women's Basketball World Cup participations ==
Year	Result
1997	3rd place, bronze medalist(s)
2007	6th

== See also ==
- Slovakia women's national basketball team
- Slovakia women's national under-20 basketball team
- Slovakia women's national under-16 basketball team
- Slovakia men's national under-18 basketball team
