= Switzerland women's national under-18 basketball team =

Switzerland
- FIBA zone: FIBA Europe
- National federation: Swiss Basketball

U19 World Cup
- Appearances: None

U18 EuroBasket
- Appearances: 1
- Medals: None

U18 EuroBasket Division B
- Appearances: 11
- Medals: None

The Switzerland women's national under-18 basketball team is a national basketball team of Switzerland, administered by the Swiss Basketball. It represents the country in international under-18 women's basketball competitions.

== FIBA U18 Women's EuroBasket participations ==
Year	Division A	Division B
1971	13th	
2008		20th
2009		14th
2010		14th
2011		16th
2012		17th

Year	Division A	Division B
2013		16th
2014		17th
2015		16th
2017		19th
2018		15th
2019		12th

== See also ==
- Switzerland women's national basketball team
- Switzerland women's national under-16 basketball team
- Switzerland men's national under-18 basketball team
