= Lithuania women's national under-18 and under-19 basketball team =

National basketball team of Lithuania

Lithuania
- FIBA zone: FIBA Europe
- National federation: Lithuanian Basketball Federation

U19 World Cup
- Appearances: 5
- Medals: None

U18 EuroBasket
- Appearances: 16
- Medals: (gold) Gold: 2 (2008, 2022)

U18 EuroBasket Division B
- Appearances: 5
- Medals: (gold) Gold: 1 (2018); (bronze) Bronze: 1 (2013)

The Lithuania women's national under-18 and under-19 basketball team is a national basketball team of Lithuania, administered by the Lithuanian Basketball Federation. It represents the country in under-18 and under-19 women's international basketball competitions.

== FIBA U18 Women's EuroBasket participations ==
Year	Division A	Division B
1996	10th	
2000	4th	
2005	7th	
2006	5th	
2007	10th	
2008	1st place, gold medalist(s)	
2009	6th	
2010	6th	
2011	16th	
2012		7th
2013		3rd place, bronze medalist(s)

Year	Division A	Division B
2014	13th	
2015	10th	
2016	9th	
2017	14th	
2018		1st place, gold medalist(s)
2019	13th	
2022	1st place, gold medalist(s)	
2023	16th	
2024		5th
2025		4th

== FIBA Under-19 Women's Basketball World Cup participations ==
Year	Result
2001	8th
2007	12th
2009	8th
2013	12th
2023	8th

== See also ==
- Lithuania women's national basketball team
- Lithuania women's national under-17 basketball team
- Lithuania men's national under-18 and under-19 basketball team
