= 2005 FIBA Europe Under-18 Championship for Women =

2005 FIBA U18 Women's European Championship
21.5th FIBA Under-18 Women's European Basketball Championship

Tournament details
- Host country: Hungary
- Teams: 16

Final positions
- Champions: Serbia and Montenegro (1st title)

The 2005 FIBA Europe Under-18 Championship for Women was an international basketball competition held in Hungary.

== Final ranking ==
1. Serbia and Montenegro

2. Spain

3. France

4. Czech Republic

5. Russia

6. Hungary

7. Lithuania

8. Slovakia

9. Germany

10. Turkey

11. Belgium

12. Bulgaria

13. Poland

14. Greece

15. Croatia

16. Italy

== Awards ==
Winners
Serbia and Montenegro
