= Russia women's national under-18 and under-19 basketball team =

Youth basketball team representing Russia

Russia
- FIBA zone: FIBA Europe

World Championships
- Appearances: 10
- Medals: (gold) Gold: (2017); (silver) Silver: (1993, 2001, 2015)

Europe Championship
- Appearances: 15
- Medals: Gold: (1996, 2000, 2002, 2004, 2014); Silver: (2008, 2012); Bronze: (1998, 2007, 2015)
Home	Away

The Russia women's national under-18 and under-19 is a national basketball team of Russia and is administered by the Russian Basketball Federation. It represents Russia in international under-19 and under-18 (under age 19 and under age 18) women's basketball competitions.

After the 2022 Russian invasion of Ukraine, FIBA banned Russian teams and officials from participating in FIBA 3x3 Basketball competitions.

== History ==
=== FIBA Under-19 World Championship ===
Year	Pos.	Pld	W	L
(South Korea) 1993	2nd place, silver medalist(s)	7	5	2
(Brazil) 1997	5th	7	6	1
(Czech Republic) 2001	2nd place, silver medalist(s)	7	5	2
(Tunisia) 2005	4th	7	4	3
(Slovakia) 2007	Did not participate			
(Thailand) 2009	6th	9	5	4
(Chile) 2011	8th	9	3	6
(Lithuania) 2013	9th	8	4	4
(Russia) 2015	2nd place, silver medalist(s)	7	6	1
(Italy) 2017	1st place, gold medalist(s)	7	7	0
(Thailand) 2019	Did not qualify			
(Hungary) 2021	8th	7	4	3
(Spain) 2023	Suspended			
(Czech Republic) 2025	Suspended			
(China) 2027	Suspended			
Total	1 title	75	49	26

=== FIBA Europe Under-18 Championship ===
Year	Pos.	Pld	W	L
(Bulgaria) 1994	4th	7	4	3
(Slovakia) 1996	1st place, gold medalist(s)	7	6	1
(Turkey) 1998	3rd place, bronze medalist(s)	8	5	3
(Poland) 2000	1st place, gold medalist(s)	8	8	0
(Slovenia) 2002	1st place, gold medalist(s)	8	8	0
(Slovakia) 2004	1st place, gold medalist(s)	8	7	1
(Hungary) 2005	5th	8	5	3
(Spain) 2006	11th	8	5	3
(Serbia) 2007	3rd place, bronze medalist(s)	8	5	3
(Slovakia) 2008	2nd place, silver medalist(s)	8	6	2
(Sweden) 2009	9th	8	3	5
(Slovakia) 2010	5th	9	6	3
(Romania) 2011	13th	9	5	4
(Romania) 2012	2nd place, silver medalist(s)	9	6	3
(Croatia) 2013	5th	9	7	2
(Portugal) 2014	1st place, gold medalist(s)	9	8	1
(Slovenia) 2015	3rd place, bronze medalist(s)	9	6	3
(Hungary) 2016	3rd place, bronze medalist(s)	7	6	1
(Hungary) 2017	11th	7	3	4
(Bosnia and Herzegovina) 2019	4th	7	4	3
Total	5 titles			

== See also ==
- Russia women's national basketball team
- Russia women's national under-17 basketball team
- Soviet Union women's national under-19 basketball team
