= 2025 FIBA U18 Women's EuroBasket Division B =

International youth basketball tournament

Tournament details
- Host country: Lithuania
- City: Vilnius, Alytus
- Dates: 4–13 July 2025
- Teams: 21 (from 1 confederation)
- Venues: 2 (in 2 host cities)

Final positions
- Champions: Sweden (2nd title)
- Runners-up: Germany
- Third place: Croatia
- Fourth place: Lithuania

Tournament statistics
- MVP: (Sweden) Shiloh Kalenga
- Top scorer: (Croatia) Lena Bilic (23.6 points per game)

Official website
- www.fiba.basketball

The 2025 FIBA U18 Women's EuroBasket Division B was the 19th edition of the Division B of the European basketball championship for women's under-18 national teams. The tournament was played in Vilnius and Alytus, Lithuania, from 4 to 13 July 2025.

== Participating teams ==
- Austria
- Azerbaijan ▲ (Runners-up, 2024 FIBA U18 Women's EuroBasket Division C)
- Bosnia and Herzegovina
- Bulgaria
- Croatia ▼ (14th place, 2024 FIBA U18 Women's EuroBasket Division A)
- Denmark
- Estonia
- Germany ▼ (15th place, 2024 FIBA U18 Women's EuroBasket Division A)
- Great Britain
- Iceland
- Ireland
- Kosovo ▲ (Winners, 2024 FIBA U18 Women's EuroBasket Division C)
- Lithuania
- Luxembourg ▼ (16th place, 2024 FIBA U18 Women's EuroBasket Division A)
- Netherlands
- North Macedonia
- Norway
- Romania
- Slovakia
- Sweden
- Ukraine

== First round ==
The draw of the first round was held on 28 January 2025 in Freising, Germany.

In the first round, the teams were drawn into four groups. The first two teams from each group advanced to the quarterfinals; the third and fourth teams from each group advanced to the 9th–16th place playoffs; the other teams advanced to the 17th–21st place classification.

All times are local (Eastern European Summer Time – UTC+3).

=== Group A ===
Pos	Team	Pld	W	L	PF	PA	PD	Pts	Qualification
1	Germany	4	4	0	272	177	+95	8	Quarterfinals
2	Sweden	4	3	1	272	214	+58	7	Quarterfinals
3	Romania	4	2	2	259	231	+28	6	9th–16th place playoffs
4	Ireland	4	1	3	281	299	−18	5	9th–16th place playoffs
5	North Macedonia	4	0	4	179	342	−163	4	17th–21st place classification

Source: FIBA

4 July 2025
13:00

Boxscore

Romania	87–45	North Macedonia
Scoring by quarter: 13–16, 24–11, 25–9, 25–9
Pts: Savu 14; Rebs: Gyorgy 12; Asts: Salamon 5		Pts: A. Nachevska 11; Rebs: A. Nachevska 11; Asts: three players 2

Alytus Arena
Attendance: 35
Referees: Jelena Tomić (CRO), Svetlana Stoyanova (BUL), Luka Brekalo (BIH)

4 July 2025
15:30

Boxscore

Germany	49–44	Sweden
Scoring by quarter: 6–14, 13–12, 13–12, 17–6
Pts: Timoschenko 10; Rebs: Gomann 10; Asts: Bielefeld 4		Pts: Norberg 12; Rebs: Jägre 10; Asts: Bajagilović 3

Alytus Arena
Attendance: 102
Referees: Andrea Bongiorni (ITA), Teo Miletić (CRO), Marija Ćirić (SRB)

5 July 2025
15:30

Boxscore

Ireland	66–78	Romania
Scoring by quarter: 14–20, 19–19, 11–29, 22–10
Pts: Kyamagero 16; Rebs: Nnabuihe 8 Asts: five players 2		Pts: Ilieș 24; Rebs: Manea 10; Asts: Constantinescu 4

Alytus Arena
Attendance: 73
Referees: Gavin Williams (GBR), Svetlana Stoyanova (BUL), Marija Ćirić (SRB)

5 July 2025
18:00

Boxscore

North Macedonia	37–85	Germany
Scoring by quarter: 8–17, 10–26, 12–25, 7–17
Pts: Nachevska 21; Rebs: Nachevska 10; Asts: Koleva 4		Pts: Timoschenko 15; Rebs: Bielefeld 8 Asts: Esser, Ilic 6

Alytus Arena
Attendance: 56
Referees: Monika Mincheva (BUL), Indrė Balnionytė–Gecevičienė (LTU), Oleksandr Oparin (UKR)

6 July 2025
13:00

Boxscore

Germany	79–50	Ireland
Scoring by quarter: 22–18, 23–9, 20–13, 14–10
Pts: R. Esser 17; Rebs: Busch 10; Asts: Ilic 5		Pts: Keane 17; Rebs: three players 5 Asts: Lyons 3

Alytus Arena
Attendance: 72
Referees: Alakbar Hasanov (AZE), Ngadhnjim Shabani (KOS), Andrea Bongiorni (ITA)

6 July 2025
20:30

Boxscore

Sweden	81–41	North Macedonia
Scoring by quarter: 16–11, 23–4, 15–14, 27–12
Pts: Jägre 18; Rebs: Skog 12; Asts: three players 4		Pts: A. Nachevska 17; Rebs: A. Nachevska 11; Asts: Djangarovska 5

Alytus Arena
Attendance: 25
Referees: Jelena Tomić (CRO), Filip Oliver Szczesny (NOR), Anastasiya Slozhenitsina (AZE)

8 July 2025
18:00

Boxscore

Ireland	76–86	Sweden
Scoring by quarter: 24–24, 20–10, 20–18, 12–34
Pts: Staunton 15; Rebs: Keane 9 Asts: Donnelly 5		Pts: Ibanez Menguc 20; Rebs: Yildirim, Ibanez Menguc 6 Asts: three players 5

Alytus Arena
Attendance: 82
Referees: Svetlana Stoyanova (BUL), Monika Mincheva (BUL), Teo Miletić (CRO)

8 July 2025
20:30

Boxscore

Romania	46–59	Germany
Scoring by quarter: 12–18, 13–13, 12–17, 9–11
Pts: Savu 21; Rebs: Gyorgy 6 Asts: Ilies, Danciulescu 3		Pts: Bielefeld 14; Rebs: Bielefeld 12; Asts: Ilic 4

Alytus Arena
Attendance: 50
Referees: Jelena Tomic (CRO), Gavin Williams (GBR), Filip Oliver Szczensy (NOR)

9 July 2025
13:00

Boxscore

North Macedonia	56–89	Ireland
Scoring by quarter: 19–18, 6–26, 20–26, 11–19
Pts: Koleva 26; Rebs: Nachevska, Trajkovska 8 Asts: Pislevska 3		Pts: Keane 24; Rebs: Nnabuihe 11; Asts: Donnelly 5

Alytus Arena
Attendance: 48
Referees: Alakbar Hasanov (AZE), Oleksandr Oparin (UKR), Anastasiya Slozhenitsina (AZE)

9 July 2025
15:30

Boxscore

Sweden	61–48	Romania
Scoring by quarter: 19–17, 17–5, 11–7, 14–19
Pts: Jagre 12; Rebs: Kalenga 10; Asts: Kalenga 5		Pts: Teglas 15; Rebs: Teglas 9 Asts: Perian, Teglas 2

Alytus Arena
Attendance: 32
Referees: Andrea Bongiorni (ITA), Luka Brekalo (BIH), Marija Ciric (SRB)

=== Group B ===
Pos	Team	Pld	W	L	PF	PA	PD	Pts	Qualification
1	Estonia	4	4	0	324	229	+95	8	Quarterfinals
2	Netherlands	4	3	1	258	240	+18	7	Quarterfinals
3	Slovakia	4	2	2	263	202	+61	6	9th–16th place playoffs
4	Luxembourg	4	1	3	183	286	−103	5	9th–16th place playoffs
5	Austria	4	0	4	198	269	−71	4	17th–21st place classification

Source: FIBA

4 July 2025
18:00

Boxscore

Austria	57–80	Estonia
Scoring by quarter: 15–14, 15–26, 13–21, 14–19
Pts: Mayr 14; Rebs: Schmid 7 Asts: Schmid 3		Pts: Grunmann 23; Rebs: Sirgi 10; Asts: Grunmann 8

Alytus Arena
Attendance: 69
Referees: Gavin Williams (GBR), Indrė Balnionytė-Gecevičienė (LTU), Ngadhnjim Shabani (KOS)

4 July 2025
20:30

Boxscore

Luxembourg	55–65	Netherlands
Scoring by quarter: 11–17, 17–10, 13–16, 14–22
Pts: Madjo 23; Rebs: Madjo 13; Asts: Schalbar 4		Pts: van der Goes 13; Rebs: van Duijn, Sjollema 6 Asts: Hidalgo 4

Alytus Arena
Attendance: 46
Referees: Alakbar Hasanov (AZE), Monika Micheva (BUL), Oleksandr Oparin (UKR)

5 July 2025
13:00

Boxscore

Slovakia	70–37	Austria
Scoring by quarter: 18–12, 11–8, 21–11, 20–6
Pts: Šedivá 14; Rebs: Čatlošová 12; Asts: Hudecová 7		Pts: Mayr 10; Rebs: Sutterluty-Fall, Köppel 7 Asts: Brunner 4

Alytus Arena
Attendance: 20
Referees: Teo Miletić (CRO), Luka Brekalo (BIH), Filip Oliver Szczesny (NOR)

5 July 2025
20:30

Boxscore

Estonia	95–45	Luxembourg
Scoring by quarter: 33–13, 20–15, 21–11, 21–6
Pts: Grunmann 18; Rebs: Sirgi 12; Asts: Grunmann 6		Pts: Manti 11; Rebs: Buzasi 8 Asts: Madjo, Wies 3

Alytus Arena
Attendance: 21
Referees: Jelena Tomić (CRO), Andrea Bongiorni (ITA), Anastasiya Slozhenitsina (AZE)

6 July 2025
15:30

Boxscore

Netherlands	67–74	Estonia
Scoring by quarter: 29–23, 17–12, 7–14, 14–25
Pts: Wassink 20; Rebs: Wassink 11; Asts: Hidalgo 7		Pts: Grunmann 20; Rebs: Sirgi 18; Asts: Grunmann 3

Alytus Arena
Attendance: 42
Referees: Svetlana Stoyanova (BUL), Marija Ćirić (SRB), Luka Brekalo (BIH)

6 July 2025
18:00

Boxscore

Luxembourg	29–74	Slovakia
Scoring by quarter: 13–20, 6–20, 2–17, 8–17
Pts: Jemming 9 Rebs: Madjo 13; Asts: four players 1		Pts: Oravcová 13; Rebs: Šedivá 18; Asts: Hudecová 6

Alytus Arena
Attendance: 33
Referees: Gavin Williams (GBR), Monika Mincheva (BUL), Indrė Balnionytė-Gecevičienė (LTU)

8 July 2025
13:00

Boxscore

Slovakia	59–61	Netherlands
Scoring by quarter: 23–16, 8–10, 12–8, 16–27
Pts: Sediva 16; Rebs: Sediva 10; Asts: Oravcova, Sediva 4		Pts: Hidalgo 19; Rebs: Blagrove, Wassink 5 Asts: Hidalgo, Blagrove 4

Alytus Arena
Attendance: 39
Referees: Andrea Bongiorni (ITA), Oleksandr Oparin (UKR), Marija Ciric (SRB)

8 July 2025
15:30

Boxscore

Austria	52–54	Luxembourg
Scoring by quarter: 19–19, 19–9, 10–19, 4–7
Pts: Mayr, Koeppel 10; Rebs: Koeppel 12; Asts: Mayr 5		Pts: Madjo 16; Rebs: Madjo 17; Asts: Schalbar 4

Alytus Arena
Attendance: 38
Referees: Alakbar Hasanov (AZE), Ngadhnjim Shabani (KOS), Anastasiya Slozhenitsina (AZE)

9 July 2025
18:00

Boxscore

Estonia	75–60	Slovakia
Scoring by quarter: 21–14, 20–15, 14–15, 20–16
Pts: Sirgi 17; Rebs: Sirgi 13; Asts: Grunmann 5		Pts: Oravcova 15; Rebs: Sediva 14; Asts: Hudecova 4

Alytus Arena
Attendance: 45
Referees: Jelena Tomic (CRO), Ngadhnjim Shabani (KOS), Filip Oliver Szczensy (NOR)

9 July 2025
20:30

Boxscore

Netherlands	65–52	Austria
Scoring by quarter: 12–13, 17–13, 22–10, 14–16
Pts: Hidalgo 22; Rebs: Wassink 13; Asts: Hidalgo, van Duijn 4		Pts: Sutterluty-Fall 13; Rebs: Sutterluty-Fall 10; Asts: Puritscher, Koeppel 3

Alytus Arena
Attendance: 50
Referees: Gavin Williams (GBR), Teo Miletić (CRO), Indrė Balnionytė-Gecevičienė (LTU)

=== Group C ===
Pos	Team	Pld	W	L	PF	PA	PD	Pts	Qualification
1	Lithuania	5	5	0	434	237	+197	10	Quarterfinals
2	Iceland	5	3	2	440	383	+57	8	Quarterfinals
3	Azerbaijan	5	3	2	327	374	−47	8	9th–16th place playoffs
4	Ukraine	5	3	2	338	363	−25	8	9th–16th place playoffs
5	Bosnia and Herzegovina	5	1	4	377	419	−42	6	17th–21st place classification
6	Kosovo	5	0	5	247	387	−140	5	17th–21st place classification

Source: FIBA

4 July 2025
10:30

Boxscore

Kosovo	51–62	Ukraine
Scoring by quarter: 16–17, 11–25, 12–13, 12–7
Pts: Haziri 21; Rebs: Shala 5 Asts: four players 2		Pts: Kutsenko 12; Rebs: Tupalo 12; Asts: Kutsenko, Shevchenko 4

NBA Basketball School, Vilnius
Attendance: 24
Referees: Joona Haaja (FIN), Amalia Marchiş (ROU), Alexander Eger (AUT)

4 July 2025
18:00

Boxscore

Iceland	73–99	Lithuania
Scoring by quarter: 11–17, 28–25, 29–22, 5–35
Pts: Armannsdottir 17; Rebs: Olafsdottir 10; Asts: Thorleifsdottir, Matthiasdottir 3		Pts: Paunksnyte 29; Rebs: Galvanauskaite 10; Asts: Paunksnyte 6

NBA Basketball School, Vilnius
Attendance: 170
Referees: Raul Zamorano Sanchez (ESP), Nemanja Ninkovic (SRB), Ivo Kitsing (EST)

4 July 2025
20:30

Boxscore

Azerbaijan	83–81	Bosnia and Herzegovina
Scoring by quarter: 34–23, 12–17, 13–19, 24–22
Pts: Gokcol, Akbingol 20; Rebs: Allahverdiyeva 12; Asts: Allahverdiyeva 6		Pts: Sehovic 32; Rebs: Cehajic 13; Asts: Mujezinovic 5

NBA Basketball School, Vilnius
Attendance: 27
Referees: Sara Månsson (SWE), Martina Mekelova (SVK), Hande Ozturk (QAT)

5 July 2025
15:30

Boxscore

Bosnia and Herzegovina	77–110	Iceland
Scoring by quarter: 13–36, 28–20, 17–23, 19–31
Pts: Sehovic 22; Rebs: Cehajic 6 Asts: Mackic 4		Pts: Steingrimsdottir 20; Rebs: Armannsdottir 7 Asts: Agnarsdottir 6

NBA Basketball School, Vilnius
Attendance: 29
Referees: Mikheil Vartanov (GEO), Alija Ferevski (MKD), Anastasia Tsakiraki (GRE)

5 July 2025
18:00

Boxscore

Lithuania	87–38	Kosovo
Scoring by quarter: 23–2, 22–17, 18–5, 24–14
Pts: Pupelyte 15; Rebs: Galvanauskaite 15; Asts: Pupelyte 5		Pts: Haziri 17; Rebs: Hoti 8 Asts: Tuhina 4

NBA Basketball School, Vilnius
Attendance: 175
Referees: Sara Månsson (SWE), Hande Ozturk (QAT), Bartłomiej Kucharski (POL)

5 July 2025
20:30

Boxscore

Ukraine	78–65	Azerbaijan
Scoring by quarter: 19–16, 25–15, 16–20, 18–14
Pts: Shevchenko 22; Rebs: Shevchenko 12; Asts: Kutsenko 7		Pts: Akbingol 18; Rebs: Ramazanli 19; Asts: Gokchol 5

NBA Basketball School, Vilnius
Attendance: 23
Referees: Raul Zamorano Sánchez (ESP), Joona Haaja (FIN), Stefan Vuković (MNE)

6 July 2025
13:00

Boxscore

Kosovo	50–82	Iceland
Scoring by quarter: 16–16, 16–19, 10–24, 8–23
Pts: Haziri 16; Rebs: Belegu 6 Asts: Haziri 3		Pts: Ólafsdóttir 16; Rebs: Ármannsdóttir 9 Asts: Halldórsdóttir 7

NBA Basketball School, Vilnius
Attendance: 62
Referees: Raul Zamorano Sanchez (ESP), Martina Mekelova (SVK), Ivo Kitsing (EST)

6 July 2025
18:00

Boxscore

Azerbaijan	31–82	Lithuania
Scoring by quarter: 10–18, 10–11, 3–28, 8–25
Pts: Shchukina 12; Rebs: Allahverdiyeva 10; Asts: Allahverdiyeva, Shchukina 2		Pts: Paunksnytė 15; Rebs: Paunksnytė 10; Asts: Paunksnytė 5

NBA Basketball School, Vilnius
Attendance: 125
Referees: Alija Ferevski (MKD), Mikheil Vartanov (GEO), Amalia Marchiș (ROU)

6 July 2025
20:30

Boxscore

Ukraine	81–76	Bosnia and Herzegovina
Scoring by quarter: 20–17, 24–12, 23–29, 14–18
Pts: Tupalo 30; Rebs: Tupalo 14; Asts: Kutsenko 6		Pts: Smaka 24; Rebs: Talić 15; Asts: Smaka 4

NBA Basketball School, Vilnius
Attendance: 36
Referees: Bartłomiej Kucharski (POL), Alexander Eger (AUT), Matic Palcic (SLO)

8 July 2025
13:00

Boxscore

Iceland	79–86	Azerbaijan
Scoring by quarter: 30–25, 12–23, 17–10, 20–28
Pts: Armannsdottir 22; Rebs: Armannsdottir 15; Asts: Armannsdottir 4		Pts: Gokcol, Akbingol 27; Rebs: Shchukina 17; Asts: Shchukina 11

NBA Basketball School, Vilnius
Attendance: 27
Referees: Sara Månsson (SWE), Stefan Vukovic (MNE), Matic Palcic (SLO)

8 July 2025
15:30

Boxscore

Bosnia and Herzegovina	94–54	Kosovo
Scoring by quarter: 24–18, 21–11, 25–6, 24–19
Pts: Smaka 19; Rebs: three players 5 Asts: three players 5		Pts: Haziri 19; Rebs: Haziri 7 Asts: Shala 4

NBA Basketball School, Vilnius
Attendance: 23
Referees: Hande Ozturk (QAT), Joona Haaja (FIN), Anastasia Tsakiraki (GRE)

8 July 2025
18:00

Boxscore

Lithuania	75–46	Ukraine
Scoring by quarter: 18–11, 14–13, 19–6, 24–16
Pts: Viscinyte 12; Rebs: Galvanauskaite 8 Asts: Paunksnyte, Pupelyte 4		Pts: Kutsenko 10; Rebs: Lesko 8 Asts: Kutsenko 3

NBA Basketball School, Vilnius
Attendance: 530
Referees: Nemanja Ninkovic (SRB), Ivo Kitsing (EST), Martina Mekelova (SVK)

9 July 2025
10:30

Boxscore

Azerbaijan	62–54	Kosovo
Scoring by quarter: 15–11, 17–14, 10–15, 20–14
Pts: Gokcol 20; Rebs: Shchukina 11; Asts: Gokchol, Shchukina 4		Pts: Haziri 14; Rebs: Hoti 10; Asts: Hoti, Tuhina 3

NBA Basketball School, Vilnius
Attendance: 33
Referees: Bartłomiej Kucharski (POL), Ivo Kitsing (EST), Martina Mekelova (SVK)

9 July 2025
13:00

Boxscore

Ukraine	71–96	Iceland
Scoring by quarter: 13–19, 24–14, 20–37, 14–26
Pts: Tupalo 34; Rebs: Ishchuk, Tupalo 7 Asts: Kutsenko 4		Pts: Armannsdottir 23; Rebs: Olafsdottir 15; Asts: Snaebjarnardottir 6

NBA Basketball School, Vilnius
Attendance: 42
Referees: Mikheil Vartanov (GEO), Alija Ferevski (MKD), Stefan Vukovic (MNE)

9 July 2025
18:00

Boxscore

Lithuania	91–49	Bosnia and Herzegovina
Scoring by quarter: 18–10, 27–8, 32–13, 14–18
Pts: Paunksnyte 13; Rebs: Galvanauskaite 11; Asts: Pupelyte 4		Pts: Smaka 21; Rebs: Smaka 9 Asts: Mackic, Sehovic 3

NBA Basketball School, Vilnius
Attendance: 154
Referees: Raul Zamorano Sanchez (ESP), Amalia Marchiș (ROU), Alexander Eger (AUT)

=== Group D ===
Pos	Team	Pld	W	L	PF	PA	PD	Pts	Qualification
1	Croatia	4	4	0	369	269	+100	8	Quarterfinals
2	Great Britain	4	3	1	324	217	+107	7	Quarterfinals
3	Bulgaria	4	2	2	268	308	−40	6	9th–16th place playoffs
4	Denmark	4	1	3	316	321	−5	5	9th–16th place playoffs
5	Norway	4	0	4	196	358	−162	4	17th–21st place classification

Source: FIBA

4 July 2025
13:00

Boxscore

Denmark	79–59	Norway
Scoring by quarter: 17–18, 18–8, 20–10, 24–23
Pts: Westphall 17; Rebs: Mauria 7 Asts: Lundin 5		Pts: Sanford 21; Rebs: Sanford 8 Asts: Lund, Rotherud 4

NBA Basketball School, Vilnius
Attendance: 38
Referees: Alija Ferevski (MKD), Stefan Vukovic (MNE), Matic Palcic (SLO)

4 July 2025
15:30

Boxscore

Croatia	70–69	Great Britain
Scoring by quarter: 22–20, 15–20, 22–15, 11–14
Pts: Bilic 23; Rebs: Vukic 11; Asts: Vukic 6		Pts: Thompson 24; Rebs: Thompson 8 Asts: Keyes, Briggs 3

NBA Basketball School, Vilnius
Attendance: 64
Referees: Bartłomiej Kucharski (POL), Oleksandr Dotsenko (UKR), Anastasia Tsakiraki (GRE)

5 July 2025
10:30

Boxscore

Bulgaria	73–72	Denmark
Scoring by quarter: 24–22, 15–14, 14–20, 20–16
Pts: Sokolova 18; Rebs: Tsoneva 8 Asts: Kokalova 7		Pts: Madsen 14; Rebs: Madsen 11; Asts: Reumert 5

NBA Basketball School, Vilnius
Attendance: 41
Referees: Nemanja Ninkovic (SRB), Ivo Kitsing (EST), Oleksandr Dotsenko (UKR)

5 July 2025
13:00

Boxscore

Norway	32–108	Croatia
Scoring by quarter: 7–23, 7–24, 13–33, 5–28
Pts: Tveiten 9 Rebs: Rotherud 11; Asts: Lund 3		Pts: Vukic 22; Rebs: Vukic 12; Asts: Gazic 8

NBA Basketball School, Vilnius
Attendance: 57
Referees: Amalia Marchiş (ROU), Alexander Eger (AUT), Martina Mekelova (SVK)

6 July 2025
10:30

Boxscore

Great Britain	90–36	Norway
Scoring by quarter: 22–3, 24–6, 21–13, 23–14
Pts: Thompson 16; Rebs: Chambers-Desmond 8 Asts: Oboavwoduo 5		Pts: Lund 10; Rebs: Tveiten 6 Asts: Lund 5

NBA Basketball School, Vilnius
Attendance: 89
Referees: Nemanja Ninković (BIH), Oleksandr Dotsenko (UKR), Hande Özturk (QAT)

6 July 2025
15:30

Boxscore

Croatia	91–70	Bulgaria
Scoring by quarter: 24–18, 27–14, 16–15, 24–23
Pts: Vukić, L. Bilić 24; Rebs: Ćorluka 9 Asts: L. Bilić 5		Pts: Sokolova, Tsoneva 13; Rebs: Milenova 10; Asts: Kokalova 5

NBA Basketball School, Vilnius
Attendance: 38
Referees: Joona Haaja (FIN), Stefan Vuković (MNE), Sara Månsson (SWE)

8 July 2025
10:30

Boxscore

Denmark	98–100	Croatia
Scoring by quarter: 22–28, 30–30, 19–21, 27–21
Pts: Finderup 26; Rebs: Mauria 8 Asts: Reumert, Gurkan-Douglas 4		Pts: Bilic 32; Rebs: Vukic 12; Asts: Bilic 7

NBA Basketball School, Vilnius
Attendance: 32
Referees: Raul Zamorano Sanchez (ESP), Oleksandr Dotsenko (UKR), Bartłomiej Kucharski (POL)

8 July 2025
20:30

Boxscore

Bulgaria	44–76	Great Britain
Scoring by quarter: 15–19, 11–27, 13–13, 5–17
Pts: Kokalova 11; Rebs: Tsoneva, Milenova 6 Asts: Georgieva 3		Pts: Thompson 18; Rebs: Yebila 7 Asts: Oboavwoduo 6

NBA Basketball School, Vilnius
Attendance: 120
Referees: Alija Ferevski (MKD), Amalia Marchiș (ROU), Mikheil Vartanov (GEO)

9 July 2025
15:30

Boxscore

Norway	69–81	Bulgaria
Scoring by quarter: 12–25, 15–17, 18–23, 24–16
Pts: Sanford 20; Rebs: Sanford 8 Asts: Sanford 6		Pts: Sokolova 18; Rebs: Sokolova, Tsoneva 9 Asts: Georgieva 7

NBA Basketball School, Vilnius
Attendance: 34
Referees: Joona Haaja (FIN), Matic Palcic (SLO), Anastasia Tsakiraki (GRE)

9 July 2025
20:30

Boxscore

Great Britain	89–67	Denmark
Scoring by quarter: 25–21, 22–15, 23–17, 19–14
Pts: Thompson 23; Rebs: Yebila 14; Asts: Thompson, Briggs 4		Pts: Fischer 11; Rebs: Gurkan-Douglas 8 Asts: Madsen 3

NBA Basketball School, Vilnius
Attendance: 50
Referees: Sara Månsson (SWE), Nemanja Ninkovic (SRB), Hande Ozturk (QAT)

== 17th–21st place classification ==
=== Group E ===
Pos	Team	Pld	W	L	PF	PA	PD	Pts	Qualification
1	Bosnia and Herzegovina	2	2	0	199	120	+79	4	17th place match
2	Norway	2	1	1	144	171	−27	3	19th place match
3	Kosovo	2	0	2	120	172	−52	2	21st place

Source: FIBA

11 July 2025
9:00

Boxscore

Kosovo	66–78	Norway
Scoring by quarter: 19–18, 8–17, 21–23, 18–20
Pts: Haziri 28; Rebs: Shala 8 Asts: Haziri 4		Pts: Sanford 28; Rebs: Lund 11; Asts: Lund 9

NBA Basketball School, Vilnius
Attendance: 12
Referees: Jelena Tomic (CRO), Anastasiya Slozhenitsina (AZE), Oleksandr Oparin (UKR)

12 July 2025
10:30

Boxscore

Norway	66–105	Bosnia and Herzegovina
Scoring by quarter: 14–28, 19–16, 15–29, 18–32
Pts: Lund, Tveiten 14; Rebs: Tveiten 13; Asts: Lund 5		Pts: Talic, Sehovic 22; Rebs: Talic 10; Asts: Mackic 8

NBA Basketball School, Vilnius
Attendance: 15
Referees: Ivo Kitsing (EST), Hande Ozturk (QAT), Matic Palcic (SLO)

=== Group F ===
Pos	Team	Pld	W	L	PF	PA	PD	Pts	Qualification
1	North Macedonia	1	1	0	78	70	+8	2	17th place match
2	Austria	1	0	1	70	78	−8	1	19th place match

Source: FIBA

11 July 2025
11:30

Boxscore

North Macedonia	78–70	Austria
Scoring by quarter: 20–19, 23–25, 14–15, 21–11
Pts: Nachevska 23; Rebs: Nachevska 17; Asts: Koleva 4		Pts: Hofer 15; Rebs: Sutterluty-Fall 14; Asts: Mayr 5

NBA Basketball School, Vilnius
Attendance: 11
Referees: Bartłomiej Kucharski (POL), Mikheil Vartanov (GEO), Anastasia Tsakiraki (GRE)

=== 19th place match ===
13 July 2025
9:00

Boxscore

Austria	90–48	Norway
Scoring by quarter: 24–9, 24–8, 22–18, 20–13
Pts: Koeppel 17; Rebs: Samanzi 9 Asts: Koeppel 8		Pts: Lund 11; Rebs: Lund 5 Asts: Lund 6

NBA Basketball School, Vilnius
Attendance: 6
Referees: Jelena Tomic (CRO), Bartłomiej Kucharski (POL), Anastasiya Slozhenitsina (AZE)

=== 17th place match ===
13 July 2025
11:30

Boxscore

North Macedonia	69–79	Bosnia and Herzegovina
Scoring by quarter: 14–32, 12–21, 15–17, 28–9
Pts: Koleva 20; Rebs: Nachevska 17; Asts: Koleva 7		Pts: Smaka 24; Rebs: Helvida 9 Asts: Mackic 8

NBA Basketball School, Vilnius
Attendance: 6
Referees: Sara Månsson (SWE), Filip Oliver Szczensy (NOR), Anastasia Tsakiraki (GRE)

== 9th–16th place playoffs ==
13th place match
Romania	73
Ireland	50
15th place match
Ukraine	69
Denmark	91

13th–16th place semifinals
Romania	66
Ukraine	57
Ireland	93
Denmark	91

9th–16th place quarterfinals
A3	Romania	68
B4	Luxembourg	75
D3	Bulgaria	70
C4	Ukraine	64
B3	Slovakia	71
A4	Ireland	60
C3	Azerbaijan	75
D4	Denmark	72

9th–12th place semifinals
Luxembourg	75
Bulgaria	89
Slovakia	77
Azerbaijan	43

9th place match
Bulgaria	61
Slovakia	79
11th place match
Luxembourg	67
Azerbaijan	54

=== 9th–16th place quarterfinals ===
11 July 2025
14:00

Boxscore

Romania	68–75	Luxembourg
Scoring by quarter: 20–17, 19–19, 13–12, 16–27
Pts: Ilies 15; Rebs: Gyorgy 9 Asts: Savu, Danciulescu 6		Pts: Madjo 25; Rebs: Madjo 11; Asts: Madjo 5

NBA Basketball School, Vilnius
Attendance: 15
Referees: Nemanja Ninkovic (SRB), Ivo Kitsing (EST), Matic Palcic (SLO)

11 July 2025
16:30

Boxscore

Bulgaria	70–64	Ukraine
Scoring by quarter: 12–20, 21–17, 16–11, 21–16
Pts: Sokolova 19; Rebs: Tsoneva 10; Asts: Borisova, Georgieva 4		Pts: Tupalo 28; Rebs: Tupalo, Lesko 8 Asts: Tupalo 4

NBA Basketball School, Vilnius
Attendance: 17
Referees: Teo Miletić (CRO), Indrė Balnionytė-Gecevičienė (LTU), Ngadhnjim Shabani (KOS)

11 July 2025
19:00

Boxscore

Slovakia	71–60	Ireland
Scoring by quarter: 13–25, 24–9, 18–7, 16–19
Pts: Oravcova 24; Rebs: Sediva 12; Asts: Hudecova 5		Pts: Staunton 15; Rebs: Keane 6 Asts: Donnelly 3

NBA Basketball School, Vilnius
Attendance: 47
Referees: Sara Månsson (SWE), Hande Ozturk (QAT), Alexander Eger (AUT)

11 July 2025
21:30

Boxscore

Azerbaijan	75–72	Denmark
Scoring by quarter: 16–20, 18–14, 16–17, 25–21
Pts: Akbingol 22; Rebs: Shchukina 13; Asts: Gokchol 7		Pts: Finderup, Norregaard 10; Rebs: Gurkan-Douglas 13; Asts: Reumert 3

NBA Basketball School, Vilnius
Attendance: 15
Referees: Gavin Williams (GBR), Marija Ciric (SRB), Filip Oliver Szczesny (NOR)

=== 13th–16th place semifinals ===
12 July 2025
13:00

Boxscore

Romania	66–57	Ukraine
Scoring by quarter: 10–20, 9–15, 22–8, 25–14
Pts: Savu 22; Rebs: Ilies 8 Asts: Constantinescu 8		Pts: Tupalo 16; Rebs: Shevchenko 12; Asts: Kutsenko, Tupalo 3

NBA Basketball School, Vilnius
Attendance: 11
Referees: Bartłomiej Kucharski (POL), Indrė Balnionytė–Gecevičienė (LTU), Filip Oliver Szczensy (NOR)

12 July 2025
15:30

Boxscore

Ireland	93–91	Denmark
Scoring by quarter: 23–31, 22–18, 27–20, 21–22
Pts: Staunton 26; Rebs: McDonnell 10; Asts: Donnelly 8		Pts: Reumert, Westphall 19; Rebs: Madsen 8 Asts: Madsen 5

NBA Basketball School, Vilnius
Attendance: 25
Referees: Teo Miletić (CRO), Anastasiya Slozhenitsina (AZE), Ngadhnjim Shabani (KOS)

=== 15th place match ===
13 July 2025
14:00

Boxscore

Ukraine	69–91	Denmark
Scoring by quarter: 23–23, 18–21, 19–34, 9–13
Pts: Kutsenko 24; Rebs: Lesko 5 Asts: Tupalo 5		Pts: Norregaard 15; Rebs: Fischer 7 Asts: Reumert 6

NBA Basketball School, Vilnius
Attendance: 53
Referees: Marija Ciric (SRB), Nemanja Ninkovic (SRB), Hande Ozturk (QAT)

=== 13th place match ===
13 July 2025
16:30

Boxscore

Romania	73–50	Ireland
Scoring by quarter: 15–15, 22–14, 21–14, 15–7
Pts: Savu 16; Rebs: three players 7 Asts: Danciulescu 5		Pts: Kyamagero, Keane 10; Rebs: McDonnell 6 Asts: Donnelly 3

NBA Basketball School, Vilnius
Attendance: 51
Referees: Mikheil Vartanov (GEO), Oleksandr Oparin (UKR), Alexander Eger (AUT)

=== 9th–12th place semifinals ===
12 July 2025
18:00

Boxscore

Luxembourg	75–89	Bulgaria
Scoring by quarter: 19–23, 17–23, 18–21, 21–22
Pts: Madjo 26; Rebs: Madjo 9 Asts: Missavage, Wittwer 3		Pts: Sokolova 25; Rebs: Tsoneva 9 Asts: Sokolova 4

NBA Basketball School, Vilnius
Attendance: 21
Referees: Jelena Tomic (CRO), Mikheil Vartanov (GEO), Alexander Eger (AUT)

12 July 2025
20:30

Boxscore

Slovakia	77–43	Azerbaijan
Scoring by quarter: 20–13, 23–7, 22–8, 12–15
Pts: Oravcova 21; Rebs: Sediva 14; Asts: Hudecova 7		Pts: Akbingol 14; Rebs: Shchukina 8 Asts: Shchukina 3

NBA Basketball School, Vilnius
Attendance: 36
Referees: Nemanja Ninkovic (SRB), Anastasia Tsakiraki (GRE), Oleksandr Oparin (UKR)

=== 11th place match ===
13 July 2025
19:00

Boxscore

Luxembourg	67–54	Azerbaijan
Scoring by quarter: 14–9, 22–14, 9–11, 22–20
Pts: Madjo 15; Rebs: Madjo 20; Asts: three players 5		Pts: Gokchol 17; Rebs: Shchukina 12; Asts: Allahverdiyeva 3

NBA Basketball School, Vilnius
Attendance: 12
Referees: Gavin Williams (GBR), Ivo Kitsing (EST), Indrė Balnionytė–Gecevičienė (LTU)

=== 9th place match ===
13 July 2025
21:30

Boxscore

Bulgaria	61–79	Slovakia
Scoring by quarter: 13–28, 13–19, 16–14, 19–18
Pts: Georgieva 12; Rebs: Milenova 8 Asts: Georgieva 11		Pts: Oravcova 18; Rebs: Catlosova 7 Asts: Hudecova 7

NBA Basketball School, Vilnius
Attendance: 15
Referees: Teo Miletić (CRO), Ngadhnjim Shabani (KOS), Matic Palcic (SLO)

== Championship playoffs ==
5th place match
Iceland	62
Great Britain	56
7th place match
Netherlands	74
Estonia	66

5th–8th place semifinals
Netherlands	58
Iceland	83
Estonia	47
Great Britain	76

Quarterfinals
A1	Germany	58
B2	Netherlands	41
D1	Croatia	81
C2	Iceland	78
B1	Estonia	70
A2	Sweden	73
C1	Lithuania	63
D2	Great Britain	54

Semifinals
Germany	75
Croatia	60
Sweden	65
Lithuania	59

Final
Germany	69
Sweden	77
3rd place match
Croatia	88
Lithuania	83

=== Quarterfinals ===
11 July 2025
13:00

Boxscore

Germany	58–41	Netherlands
Scoring by quarter: 14–14, 8–12, 15–7, 21–8
Pts: Esser, Gomann 12; Rebs: Bielefeld 11; Asts: Bielefeld 5		Pts: Wassink 10; Rebs: Blagrove 6 Asts: Blagrove 4

Alytus Arena
Attendance: 112
Referees: Alija Ferevski (MKD), Martina Mekelova (SVK), Stefan Vukovic (MNE)

11 July 2025
15:30

Boxscore

Croatia	81–78	Iceland
Scoring by quarter: 20–18, 20–17, 22–22, 19–21
Pts: Vukic 23; Rebs: Vukic 13; Asts: Bilic 6		Pts: Agustsdottir 14; Rebs: Armannsdottir 10; Asts: Armannsdottir 7

Alytus Arena
Attendance: 42
Referees: Andrea Bongiorni (ITA), Amalia Marchiș (ROU), Alakbar Hasanov (AZE)

11 July 2025
18:00

Boxscore

Lithuania	63–54	Great Britain
Scoring by quarter: 19–10, 10–19, 16–13, 18–12
Pts: Galvanauskaite 21; Rebs: Galvanauskaite 18; Asts: Paunksnyte 8		Pts: Thompson 20; Rebs: Habbal 7 Asts: Guttormsdottir Frost 3

Alytus Arena
Attendance: 503
Referees: Joona Haaja (FIN), Svetlana Stoyanova (BUL), Luka Brekalo (BIH)

11 July 2025
20:30

Boxscore

Estonia	70–73	Sweden
Scoring by quarter: 18–22, 23–17, 13–23, 16–11
Pts: Grunmann 24; Rebs: Sirgi 21; Asts: Veisberg 3		Pts: Curman 13; Rebs: Jagre 8 Asts: Curman 6

Alytus Arena
Attendance: 49
Referees: Raúl Zamorano Sánchez (ESP), Monika Mincheva (BUL), Oleksandr Dotsenko (UKR)

=== 5th–8th place semifinals ===
12 July 2025
13:00

Boxscore

Netherlands	58–83	Iceland
Scoring by quarter: 12–19, 16–19, 18–22, 12–23
Pts: Blagrove 14; Rebs: Sjollema 10; Asts: Van Dijk 6		Pts: Steingrimsdottir 21; Rebs: Armannsdottir 10; Asts: Steingrimsdottir 6

Alytus Arena
Attendance: 34
Referees: Joona Haaja (FIN), Monika Mincheva (BUL), Luka Brekalo (BIH)

12 July 2025
15:30

Boxscore

Estonia	47–76	Great Britain
Scoring by quarter: 12–20, 11–19, 15–25, 9–12
Pts: three players 9 Rebs: Vetesina 6 Asts: Küttis 2		Pts: Guttormsdottir Frost 17; Rebs: Yebila 10; Asts: Habbal, Oboavwoduo 3

Alytus Arena
Attendance: 43
Referees: Alija Ferevski (MKD), Alakbar Hasanov (AZE), Martina Mekelova (SVK)

=== 7th place match ===
13 July 2025
13:00

Boxscore

Netherlands	74–66	Estonia
Scoring by quarter: 18–17, 20–12, 19–12, 17–25
Pts: Hidalgo 18; Rebs: Sjollema 6 Asts: Hidalgo 5		Pts: Grunmann 26; Rebs: Sirgi 14; Asts: Veisberg 6

Alytus Arena
Attendance: 36
Referees: Svetlana Stoyanova (BUL), Martina Mekelova (SVK), Luka Brekalo (BIH)

=== 5th place match ===
13 July 2025
15:30

Boxscore

Iceland	62–56	Great Britain
Scoring by quarter: 24–21, 10–15, 12–8, 16–12
Pts: Armannsdottir 16; Rebs: Olafsdottir 8 Asts: Halldorsdottir 5		Pts: Thompson 19; Rebs: Briggs 10; Asts: Guttormsdottir Frost 5

Alytus Arena
Attendance: 42
Referees: Amalia Marchiș (ROU), Monika Mincheva (BUL), Oleksandr Dotsenko (UKR)

=== Semifinals ===
12 July 2025
18:00

Boxscore

Sweden	65–59	Lithuania
Scoring by quarter: 15–16, 15–14, 13–13, 22–16
Pts: Kalenga 19; Rebs: Curman, Jagre 7 Asts: Yildirim, Bajagilovic 3		Pts: Rusoviciute 16; Rebs: Galvanauskaite 20; Asts: Paunksnyte 5

Alytus Arena
Attendance: 513
Referees: Andrea Bongiorni (ITA), Amalia Marchiș (ROU), Stefan Vukovic (MNE)

12 July 2025
20:30

Boxscore

Germany	75–60	Croatia
Scoring by quarter: 17–16, 25–11, 12–16, 21–17
Pts: Esser 22; Rebs: Bielefeld 17; Asts: Bielefeld 8		Pts: Vukic 25; Rebs: Vukic, Bilic 8 Asts: Vukic 4

Alytus Arena
Attendance: 61
Referees: Raul Zamorano Sanchez (ESP), Oleksandr Dotsenko (UKR), Svetlana Stoyanova (BUL)

=== 3rd place match ===
13 July 2025
18:00

Boxscore

Croatia	88–83	Lithuania
Scoring by quarter: 23–22, 21–9, 20–18, 24–34
Pts: Bilic 41; Rebs: Vukic 13; Asts: Bilic 7		Pts: Griskute 18; Rebs: Galvanauskaite 18; Asts: Paunksnyte 7

Alytus Arena
Attendance: 532
Referees: Alija Ferevski (MKD), Joona Haaja (FIN), Alakbar Hasanov (AZE)

=== Final ===
13 July 2025
20:30

Boxscore

Germany	69–77	Sweden
Scoring by quarter: 18–16, 20–12, 18–28, 13–21
Pts: Esser, Ilic 15; Rebs: Bielefeld 17; Asts: Bielefeld 13		Pts: Kalenga 29; Rebs: Bajagilovic 8 Asts: Bajagilovic 7

Alytus Arena
Attendance: 304
Referees: Andrea Bongiorni (ITA), Stefan Vukovic (MNE), Luka Brekalo (BIH)

== Final standings ==
Rank	Team	Record
1st place, gold medalist(s)	Sweden	6–1
2nd place, silver medalist(s)	Germany	6–1
3rd place, bronze medalist(s)	Croatia	6–1
4	Lithuania	6–2
5	Iceland	5–3
6	Great Britain	4–3
7	Netherlands	4–3
8	Estonia	4–3
9	Slovakia	5–2
10	Bulgaria	4–3
11	Luxembourg	3–4
12	Azerbaijan	4–4
13	Romania	4–3
14	Ireland	2–5
15	Denmark	2–5
16	Ukraine	3–5
17	Bosnia and Herzegovina	3–4
18	North Macedonia	1–5
19	Austria	1–5
20	Norway	1–6
21	Kosovo	0–6

Promoted to the 2026 FIBA U18 Women's EuroBasket Division A

== Statistics and awards ==
=== Statistical leaders ===
==== Players ====
Points

Name	PPG
(Croatia) Lena Bilic	23.6
(Croatia) Lea Vukic	22.9
(Norway) Siena Sanford	21.0
(Ukraine) Polina Tupalo	20.6
(Kosovo) Malvina Haziri	19.2

Rebounds

Name	RPG
(Estonia) Lisa Sirgi	13.1
(Lithuania) Gabija Galvanauskaite	13.1
(North Macedonia) Anja Nachevska	12.7
(Luxembourg) Dionne Madjo	12.6
(Slovakia) Katarina Sediva	11.3

Assists

Name	APG
(Slovakia) Daniela Hudecova	5.6
(Germany) Clara Bielefeld	5.3
(Norway) Milena Lund	5.0
(Lithuania) Daniele Paunksnyte	5.0
(Bulgaria) Elena Georgieva	4.7

Blocks

Name	BLKPG
(Estonia) Lisandra Vetesina	2.9
(Germany) Clara Bielefeld	2.7
(Estonia) Lisa Sirgi	2.7
(Romania) Crina-Raluca Teglas	2.4
(Luxembourg) Dionne Madjo	2.0

Steals

Name	STLPG
(Luxembourg) Dionne Madjo	4.7
(Slovakia) Katarina Sediva	4.3
(Ukraine) Polina Tupalo	4.1
(Netherlands) Quintilla Hidalgo	4.0
(Estonia) Laura Grunmann	3.7

Efficiency

Name	EFFPG
(Luxembourg) Dionne Madjo	26.4
(Lithuania) Gabija Galvanauskaite	24.4
(Croatia) Lea Vukic	22.9
(Croatia) Lena Bilic	22.7
(Estonia) Lisa Sirgi	21.1

==== Teams ====
Points

Team	PPG
Croatia	85.4
Iceland	82.9
Denmark	81.4
Bosnia and Herzegovina	80.1
Lithuania	79.9

Rebounds

Team	RPG
Germany	56.0
Austria	53.3
Estonia	50.1
Croatia	48.4
Great Britain	48.0

Assists

Team	APG
Lithuania	20.8
Iceland	20.5
Denmark	19.6
Germany	19.6
Bosnia and Herzegovina	18.6

Blocks

Team	BLKPG
Estonia	7.7
Germany	6.0
Austria	4.7
Sweden	4.6
Great Britain	4.3

Steals

Team	STLPG
Netherlands	17.3
Ukraine	16.5
Romania	16.0
Bosnia and Herzegovina	15.6
Iceland	15.6

Efficiency

Team	EFFPG
Lithuania	98.4
Croatia	93.0
Iceland	89.6
Denmark	88.4
Bosnia and Herzegovina	86.9

=== Awards ===
The awards were announced on 13 July 2025.

Award	Player
All-Tournament Team	(Sweden) Shiloh Kalenga
All-Tournament Team	(Germany) Clara Bielefeld
All-Tournament Team	(Croatia) Lena Bilic
All-Tournament Team	(Croatia) Lea Vukic
All-Tournament Team	(Lithuania) Gabija Galvanauskaite
Most Valuable Player	(Sweden) Shiloh Kalenga
