= 2024 FIBA U18 Women's EuroBasket Division B =

International basketball tournament

Tournament details
- Host country: Romania
- City: Ploiești, Blejoi
- Dates: 2–11 August 2024
- Teams: 18 (from 1 confederation)
- Venues: 2 (in 2 host cities)

Final positions
- Champions: Montenegro (1st title)
- Runners-up: Czech Republic
- Third place: Greece
- Fourth place: Bulgaria

Tournament statistics
- Games played: 61
- Attendance: 7,362 (121 per game)
- MVP: (Montenegro) Jelena Bulajic
- Top scorer: (Austria) Sina Hollerl (22.7 points per game)

Official website
- www.fiba.basketball

The 2024 FIBA U18 Women's EuroBasket Division B was the 18th edition of the Division B of the European basketball championship for women's under-18 national teams. The tournament was played in Ploiești and Blejoi, Romania, from 2 to 11 August 2024.

== Participating teams ==
- Austria
- Bosnia and Herzegovina
- Bulgaria
- Czech Republic ▼ (14th place, 2023 FIBA U18 Women's European Championship Division A)
- Denmark
- Great Britain
- Greece
- Iceland
- Ireland
- Lithuania ▼ (16th place, 2023 FIBA U18 Women's European Championship Division A)
- Montenegro
- Netherlands
- North Macedonia
- Norway
- Romania
- Slovakia
- Sweden
- Ukraine

== First round ==
The draw of the first round was held on 6 February 2024 in Freising, Germany.

In the first round, the teams were drawn into four groups. The first two teams from each group advance to the quarterfinals; the other teams will play in the 9th–18th place classification groups.

All times are local (Eastern European Summer Time – UTC+3).

=== Group A ===
Pos	Team	Pld	W	L	PF	PA	PD	Pts	Qualification
1	Bulgaria	4	4	0	280	215	+65	8	Quarterfinals
2	Greece	4	3	1	291	213	+78	7	Quarterfinals
3	Ireland	4	2	2	259	234	+25	6	9th–18th place classification
4	Norway	4	1	3	226	242	−16	5	9th–18th place classification
5	North Macedonia	4	0	4	190	342	−152	4	9th–18th place classification

Source: FIBA

2 August 2024
13:30

Boxscore

Bulgaria	51–45	Norway
Scoring by quarter: 13–10, 8–11, 19–10, 11–14
Pts: Manolova 15; Rebs: Manolova 18; Asts: Dragoeva 4		Pts: Wikstrom 14; Rebs: Laugen 8 Asts: Toyomasu 5

Olimpia Hall, Ploiești
Attendance: 40
Referees: Petr Blahout (CZE), Ileana Maria Dragoi (ROU), Yurii Shcherbak (UKR)

2 August 2024
16:00

Boxscore

North Macedonia	52–86	Ireland
Scoring by quarter: 12–24, 10–17, 16–28, 14–17
Pts: Sarafiloska, Trajkovska 9 Rebs: Nikolikj 6 Asts: Pislevska 4		Pts: Prenter 15; Rebs: Tolan, Quinn 9 Asts: Prenter 8

Olimpia Hall, Ploiești
Referees: Oleksandr Dotsenko (UKR), Davíð Tómas Tómasson (ISL), Irene Frosolini (ITA)

3 August 2024
16:00

Boxscore

Greece	88–46	North Macedonia
Scoring by quarter: 23–10, 20–15, 24–10, 21–11
Pts: Lianoudi 14; Rebs: Chatira 9 Asts: Felouri 5		Pts: Koleva 11; Rebs: Nikolikj 7 Asts: Angelovska 3

Sala Polivalenta Blejoi
Attendance: 30
Referees: Petr Blahout (CZE), Sava Cetkovic (MNE), Ileana Maria Dragoi (ROU)

3 August 2024
18:30

Boxscore

Ireland	64–68	Bulgaria
Scoring by quarter: 15–15, 14–16, 18–21, 17–16
Pts: Prenter 24; Rebs: Walshe 8 Asts: Walshe 4		Pts: Manolova 21; Rebs: Manolova 18; Asts: Dragoeva 7

Sala Polivalenta Blejoi
Attendance: 70
Referees: Sergii Zashchuk (UKR), Hasan Bajgoric (BIH), Romana Rea Car (AUT)

4 August 2024
18:30

Boxscore

Bulgaria	72–62	Greece
Scoring by quarter: 24–20, 21–12, 15–18, 12–12
Pts: Sokolova 17; Rebs: Manolova 12; Asts: Madankova 8		Pts: Chatira, Syrpa 13; Rebs: Four players 5 Asts: Chatira 4

Sala Polivalenta Blejoi
Attendance: 60
Referees: Sergii Zashchuk (UKR), Luís Daniel Mascarenhas De Oliveira (POR), Irene Frosolini (ITA)

4 August 2024
21:00

Boxscore

Norway	52–64	Ireland
Scoring by quarter: 12–20, 10–24, 16–11, 14–9
Pts: Johansen 14; Rebs: Priestley 8 Asts: Wikstrom 4		Pts: Prenter 14; Rebs: Tolan 9 Asts: Boyce 6

Sala Polivalenta Blejoi
Attendance: 70
Referees: Andras Mate Stretea (ROU), Bilal Bardaqji (SWE), Lynn Weiwers (LUX)

6 August 2024
16:00

Boxscore

North Macedonia	44–89	Bulgaria
Scoring by quarter: 10–31, 11–15, 12–19, 11–24
Pts: Dimkovska 11; Rebs: Angelovska 7 Asts: Five players 1		Pts: Stoynova 13; Rebs: Kostova 16; Asts: Dragoeva 7

Olimpia Hall, Ploiești
Referees: Jakub Izak (SVK), Andras Mate Stretea (ROU), Bilal Bardaqji (SWE)

6 August 2024
16:00

Boxscore

Greece	79–50	Norway
Scoring by quarter: 20–12, 26–10, 20–16, 13–12
Pts: Sioumoureki 16; Rebs: Paraskevopoulou 9 Asts: Cholopoulou 7		Pts: Wikstrom 13; Rebs: Priestley 7 Asts: Priestley 3

Sala Polivalenta Blejoi
Attendance: 60
Referees: Yurii Shcherbak (UKR), Milita Stalaucinskaite (LTU), Bogna Podkowinska (POL)

7 August 2024
13:30

Boxscore

Ireland	45–62	Greece
Scoring by quarter: 14–14, 9–22, 11–12, 11–14
Pts: Prenter 22; Rebs: Tolan 8 Asts: Bracken 3		Pts: Stoligka 19; Rebs: Chatira 9 Asts: Stoligka, Chatira 5

Olimpia Hall, Ploiești
Attendance: 70
Referees: Li Jin (CHN), Romana Rea Car (AUT), Sava Cetkovic (MNE)

7 August 2024
18:30

Boxscore

Norway	79–48	North Macedonia
Scoring by quarter: 24–18, 18–9, 19–12, 18–9
Pts: Wikstrom 22; Rebs: Priestley 11; Asts: Priestley 5		Pts: Pislevska 11; Rebs: Nikolikj 8 Asts: Djangarovska 3

Olimpia Hall, Ploiești
Attendance: 80
Referees: Mateusz Skorek (POL), Ileana Maria Dragoi (ROU), Hasan Bajgoric (BIH)

=== Group B ===
Pos	Team	Pld	W	L	PF	PA	PD	Pts	Qualification
1	Great Britain	3	2	1	167	183	−16	5	Quarterfinals
2	Lithuania	3	2	1	214	157	+57	5	Quarterfinals
3	Netherlands	3	1	2	169	194	−25	4	9th–18th place classification
4	Denmark	3	1	2	168	184	−16	4	9th–18th place classification

Source: FIBA

2 August 2024
13:30

Boxscore

Denmark	52–68	Netherlands
Scoring by quarter: 12–22, 14–9, 6–22, 20–15
Pts: Borges-Michaelsen 19; Rebs: Borges-Michaelsen 8 Asts: Three players 2		Pts: Van Vliet 16; Rebs: Peters 14; Asts: Vogelaar 5

Sala Polivalenta Blejoi
Attendance: 50
Referees: Sergii Zashchuk (UKR), Hasan Bajgoric (BIH), Jakub Izak (SVK)

2 August 2024
21:00

Boxscore

Lithuania	61–62	Great Britain
Scoring by quarter: 19–12, 11–11, 11–25, 20–14
Pts: Aukstikalnyte 14; Rebs: Aukstikalnyte 11; Asts: Three players 3		Pts: Guttormsdottir Frost 18; Rebs: Wright 12; Asts: Keyes 4

Olimpia Hall, Ploiești
Attendance: 60
Referees: Sava Cetkovic (MNE), Andras Mate Stretea (ROU), Bilal Bardaqji (SWE)

4 August 2024
13:30

Boxscore

Great Britain	38–65	Denmark
Scoring by quarter: 8–22, 11–17, 8–12, 11–14
Pts: Guttormsdottir Frost 11; Rebs: Guttormsdottir Frost 7 Asts: Five players 1		Pts: Jensen 17; Rebs: Westphall 8 Asts: Borges-Michaelsen 4

Sala Polivalenta Blejoi
Attendance: 50
Referees: Stefan Zdravkovic (SRB), Ileana Maria Dragoi (ROU), Ema Nikochevikj (MKD)

4 August 2024
16:00

Boxscore

Netherlands	44–75	Lithuania
Scoring by quarter: 11–20, 14–17, 7–25, 12–13
Pts: Vogelaar, Peters 8 Rebs: Van Vliet, Peters 5 Asts: Four players 2		Pts: Kacerauskaite 18; Rebs: Kacerauskaite 7 Asts: Three players 2

Sala Polivalenta Blejoi
Attendance: 50
Referees: Petr Blahout (CZE), Yurii Shcherbak (UKR), Bogna Podkowinska (POL)

7 August 2024
16:00

Boxscore

Netherlands	57–67	Great Britain
Scoring by quarter: 18–11, 18–19, 7–16, 14–21
Pts: Van Vliet 17; Rebs: Van Vliet 15; Asts: Linger, Van Vliet 3		Pts: Cox 15; Rebs: Wright 14; Asts: Cox 4

Olimpia Hall, Ploiești
Attendance: 50
Referees: Yurii Shcherbak (UKR), Alexander Svendberg (NOR), Oleksandr Dotsenko (UKR)

7 August 2024
21:00

Boxscore

Lithuania	78–51	Denmark
Scoring by quarter: 19–13, 22–7, 16–18, 21–13
Pts: Aukstikalnyte 28; Rebs: Matulevicius 11; Asts: Matulevicius, Paunksnyte 4		Pts: Jensen 17; Rebs: Borges-Michaelsen 5 Asts: Bjerregaard 4

Olimpia Hall, Ploiești
Attendance: 80
Referees: Bogna Podkowinska (POL), Aikaterini Asimakaki (GRE), Jakub Izak (SVK)

=== Group C ===
Pos	Team	Pld	W	L	PF	PA	PD	Pts	Qualification
1	Czech Republic	3	3	0	215	188	+27	6	Quarterfinals
2	Slovakia	3	2	1	181	177	+4	5	Quarterfinals
3	Iceland	3	1	2	212	228	−16	4	9th–18th place classification
4	Austria	3	0	3	209	224	−15	3	9th–18th place classification

Source: FIBA

2 August 2024
16:00

Boxscore

Czech Republic	80–69	Austria
Scoring by quarter: 18–18, 18–19, 29–14, 15–18
Pts: Brzonova 25; Rebs: Kalna 8 Asts: Kamenikova, Pilarova 3		Pts: Hollerl 21; Rebs: Hollerl 9 Asts: Matzka 4

Sala Polivalenta Blejoi
Attendance: 30
Referees: Jamie Dooley (IRL), Alexander Svendberg (NOR), Ema Nikochevikj (MKD)

2 August 2024
18:30

Boxscore

Iceland	61–69	Slovakia
Scoring by quarter: 25–10, 20–23, 8–19, 8–17
Pts: Armannsdottir 18; Rebs: Armannsdottir 10; Asts: Saevarsdottir 4		Pts: Stefancova 17; Rebs: Stefancova, Pelanova 8 Asts: Duratna 5

Sala Polivalenta Blejoi
Attendance: 30
Referees: Mateusz Skorek (POL), Josh Bowe (GBR), Jin Li (CHN)

4 August 2024
13:30

Boxscore

Austria	88–89 (OT)	Iceland
Scoring by quarter: 24–23, 16–11, 15–24, 21–18, Overtime: 12–13
Pts: Hollerl 33; Rebs: Reisner 12; Asts: Reisner 5		Pts: Armannsdottir 25; Rebs: Armannsdottir 14; Asts: Magnusdottir 4

Olimpia Hall, Ploiești
Attendance: 70
Referees: Stefan Stefanov (BUL), Sava Cetkovic (MNE), Monika Mincheva (BUL)

4 August 2024
16:00

Boxscore

Slovakia	57–64	Czech Republic
Scoring by quarter: 16–17, 12–16, 19–19, 10–12
Pts: Stefancova 16; Rebs: Tausova 6 Asts: Stefancova 4		Pts: Zidkova 11; Rebs: Zidkova 8 Asts: Brzonova, Pilarova 5

Olimpia Hall, Ploiești
Attendance: 100
Referees: Josh Bowe (GBR), Aikaterini Asimakaki (GRE), Oleksandr Dotsenko (UKR)

7 August 2024
13:30

Boxscore

Slovakia	55–52	Austria
Scoring by quarter: 14–15, 9–14, 15–14, 17–9
Pts: Stefancova 12; Rebs: Duratna, Sediva 10; Asts: Duratna 5		Pts: Hollerl 18; Rebs: Reisner 7 Asts: Reisner 3

Sala Polivalenta Blejoi
Attendance: 20
Referees: Sergii Zashchuk (UKR), Irene Frosolini (ITA), Jamie Dooley (IRL)

7 August 2024
21:00

Boxscore

Czech Republic	71–62	Iceland
Scoring by quarter: 26–18, 19–19, 13–17, 13–8
Pts: Brzonova 17; Rebs: Pavelcova 8 Asts: Blahova, Pilarova 3		Pts: Armannsdottir, Saevarsdottir 15; Rebs: Armannsdottir 9 Asts: Magnusdottir 4

Sala Polivalenta Blejoi
Attendance: 50
Referees: Stefan Zdravkovic (SRB), Lynn Weiwers (LUX), Bilal Bardaqji (SWE)

=== Group D ===
Pos	Team	Pld	W	L	PF	PA	PD	Pts	Qualification
1	Montenegro	4	4	0	275	204	+71	8	Quarterfinals
2	Bosnia and Herzegovina	4	3	1	284	253	+31	7	Quarterfinals
3	Ukraine	4	2	2	264	262	+2	6	9th–18th place classification
4	Romania	4	1	3	243	291	−48	5	9th–18th place classification
5	Sweden	4	0	4	211	267	−56	4	9th–18th place classification

Source: FIBA

2 August 2024
18:30

Boxscore

Romania	56–78	Montenegro
Scoring by quarter: 13–16, 18–15, 16–24, 9–23
Pts: Savu 18; Rebs: Zane 8 Asts: Tenu 5		Pts: Bulajic 26; Rebs: Rondovic 8 Asts: Dragisic 4

Olimpia Hall, Ploiești
Attendance: 200
Referees: Stefan Zdravkovic (SRB), Bogna Podkowinska (POL), Milita Stalaucinskaite (LTU)

2 August 2024
21:00

Boxscore

Ukraine	71–62 (OT)	Sweden
Scoring by quarter: 12–11, 17–15, 20–9, 8–22, Overtime: 14–5
Pts: Syniakova 20; Rebs: Syniakova 11; Asts: Lavrinets 6		Pts: Blomkvist 12; Rebs: Blomkvist 10; Asts: Kalenga 5

Sala Polivalenta Blejoi
Attendance: 50
Referees: Stefan Stefanov (BUL), Luís Daniel Mascarenhas De Oliveira (POR), Monika Mincheva (BUL)

3 August 2024
16:00

Boxscore

Bosnia and Herzegovina	83–79	Ukraine
Scoring by quarter: 13–26, 28–14, 21–19, 21–20
Pts: Damjanovic 22; Rebs: Damjanovic 13; Asts: Kahrimanovic 5		Pts: Syniakova 16; Rebs: Syniakova 11; Asts: Lavrinets 4

Olimpia Hall, Ploiești
Attendance: 80
Referees: Stefan Zdravkovic (SRB), Milita Stalaucinskaite (LTU), Lynn Weiwers (LUX)

3 August 2024
18:30

Boxscore

Sweden	64–67	Romania
Scoring by quarter: 16–11, 18–25, 22–13, 8–18
Pts: Ersdala 17; Rebs: Blomkvist 10; Asts: Curman, Kalenga 4		Pts: Savu 19; Rebs: Zane 9 Asts: Tenu 4

Olimpia Hall, Ploiești
Attendance: 1,005
Referees: Josh Bowe (GBR), Alexander Svendberg (NOR), Aikaterini Asimakaki (GRE)

4 August 2024
18:30

Boxscore

Romania	67–81	Bosnia and Herzegovina
Scoring by quarter: 27–17, 10–23, 7–25, 23–16
Pts: Belegante 20; Rebs: Manea 9 Asts: Tenu 5		Pts: Sehovic 22; Rebs: Djokic 9 Asts: Dosic 5

Olimpia Hall, Ploiești
Attendance: 780
Referees: Li Jin (CHN), Davíð Tómas Tómasson (ISL), Jamie Dooley (IRL)

4 August 2024
21:00

Boxscore

Montenegro	65–46	Sweden
Scoring by quarter: 10–8, 22–11, 13–7, 20–20
Pts: Bulajic 16; Rebs: Rondovic 7 Asts: Radevic, Vrcan 2		Pts: Kajevic, Blomkvist 9 Rebs: Jagre 7 Asts: Blomkvist 5

Olimpia Hall, Ploiești
Attendance: 100
Referees: Mateusz Skorek (POL), Jakub Izak (SVK), Romana Rea Car (AUT)

6 August 2024
18:30

Boxscore

Ukraine	68–53	Romania
Scoring by quarter: 15–10, 19–20, 13–9, 21–14
Pts: Three players 13; Rebs: Tupalo 6 Asts: Lavrinets 3		Pts: Tenu 16; Rebs: Nemes 7 Asts: Tenu 3

Olimpia Hall, Ploiești
Attendance: 600
Referees: Mateusz Skorek (POL), Monika Mincheva (BUL), Alexander Svendberg (NOR)

6 August 2024
18:30

Boxscore

Bosnia and Herzegovina	56–68	Montenegro
Scoring by quarter: 16–20, 22–15, 5–10, 13–23
Pts: Three players 10; Rebs: Damjanovic, Djokic 9 Asts: Dosic, Kahrimanovic 4		Pts: Bulajic 26; Rebs: Andric 8 Asts: Radevic 5

Sala Polivalenta Blejoi
Attendance: 30
Referees: Stefan Stefanov (BUL), Irene Frosolini (ITA), Luís Daniel Mascarenhas De Oliveira (POR)

7 August 2024
16:00

Boxscore

Montenegro	64–46	Ukraine
Scoring by quarter: 20–7, 7–13, 21–17, 16–9
Pts: Bulajic 15; Rebs: Andric 10; Asts: Dragisic, Radevic 5		Pts: Tupalo, Tykha 12; Rebs: Syniakova 8 Asts: Tykha, Syniakova 4

Sala Polivalenta Blejoi
Attendance: 20
Referees: Milita Stalaucinskaite (LTU), Luís Daniel Mascarenhas De Oliveira (POR), Davíð Tómas Tómasson (ISL)

7 August 2024
18:30

Boxscore

Sweden	39–64	Bosnia and Herzegovina
Scoring by quarter: 6–21, 17–12, 8–11, 8–20
Pts: Scholander, Ersdala 7 Rebs: Blomkvist 8 Asts: Scholander, Blomkvist 2		Pts: Kahrimanovic 17; Rebs: Damjanovic, Djokic 8 Asts: Kahrimanovic 4

Sala Polivalenta Blejoi
Attendance: 50
Referees: Petr Blahout (CZE), Ema Nikochevikj (MKD), Josh Bowe (GBR)

== 9th–18th place classification ==
=== Group E ===
Pos	Team	Pld	W	L	PF	PA	PD	Pts	Qualification
1	Ireland	4	4	0	303	225	+78	8	9th place match
2	Netherlands	4	3	1	262	199	+63	7	11th place match
3	Denmark	4	2	2	263	230	+33	6	13th place match
4	Norway	4	1	3	223	242	−19	5	15th place match
5	North Macedonia	4	0	4	164	319	−155	4	17th place match

Source: FIBA

8 August 2024
16:00

Boxscore

Norway	47–62	Denmark
Scoring by quarter: 12–14, 15–21, 6–11, 14–16
Pts: Wikstrom 14; Rebs: Priestley 9 Asts: Priestley 5		Pts: Jensen 21; Rebs: Borges-Michaelsen 9 Asts: Moller 3

Sala Polivalenta Blejoi
Attendance: 50
Referees: Andras Mate Stretea (ROU), Romana Rea Car (AUT), Oleksandr Dotsenko (UKR)

8 August 2024
18:30

Boxscore

Netherlands	62–25	North Macedonia
Scoring by quarter: 12–9, 14–6, 19–8, 17–2
Pts: Vogelaar 16; Rebs: Peters 9 Asts: Vogelaar 5		Pts: Koleva, Miceva 7 Rebs: Angelovska 7 Asts: Four players 1

Sala Polivalenta Blejoi
Attendance: 35
Referees: Lynn Weiwers (LUX), Aikaterini Asimakaki (GRE), Davíð Tómas Tómasson (ISL)

9 August 2024
13:30

Boxscore

Ireland	77–64	Netherlands
Scoring by quarter: 18–13, 18–16, 23–15, 18–20
Pts: Tolan 15; Rebs: Tolan 6 Asts: Prenter, Tolan 4		Pts: Vogelaar 26; Rebs: Van Vliet 10; Asts: Five players 2

Sala Polivalenta Blejoi
Attendance: 80
Referees: Oleksandr Dotsenko (UKR), Stefan Stefanov (BUL), Hasan Bajgoric (BIH)

9 August 2024
16:00

Boxscore

Denmark	92–39	North Macedonia
Scoring by quarter: 26–9, 23–13, 21–9, 22–8
Pts: Jensen 27; Rebs: Westphall, Schiott 8 Asts: Four players 3		Pts: Aleksova 8 Rebs: Three players 3 Asts: Koleva, Angelovska 2

Sala Polivalenta Blejoi
Attendance: 30
Referees: Sergii Zashchuk (UKR), Ileana Maria Dragoi (ROU), Bilal Bardaqji (SWE)

10 August 2024
13:30

Boxscore

Ireland	76–57	Denmark
Scoring by quarter: 20–10, 25–25, 15–12, 16–10
Pts: Moran 15; Rebs: Three players 7 Asts: Prenter 5		Pts: Jensen 19; Rebs: Bjerregaard 7 Asts: Borges-Michaelsen 4

Sala Polivalenta Blejoi
Attendance: 30
Referees: Petr Blahout (CZE), Ileana Maria Dragoi (ROU), Aikaterini Asimakaki (GRE)

10 August 2024
16:00

Boxscore

Netherlands	68–45	Norway
Scoring by quarter: 21–14, 18–6, 17–12, 12–13
Pts: Douwstra 15; Rebs: Van Vliet 8 Asts: Van Vliet 5		Pts: Priestley 12; Rebs: Priestley 7 Asts: Wikstrom, Priestley 3

Sala Polivalenta Blejoi
Attendance: 30
Referees: Luís Daniel Mascarenhas De Oliveira (POR), Lynn Weiwers (LUX), Jakub Izak (SVK)

=== Group F ===
Pos	Team	Pld	W	L	PF	PA	PD	Pts	Qualification
1	Ukraine	4	4	0	288	228	+60	8	9th place match
2	Iceland	4	2	2	272	279	−7	6	11th place match
3	Romania	4	2	2	250	269	−19	6	13th place match
4	Austria	4	1	3	298	310	−12	5	15th place match
5	Sweden	4	1	3	259	281	−22	5	17th place match

Source: FIBA

8 August 2024
16:00

Boxscore

Austria	78–63	Sweden
Scoring by quarter: 12–15, 22–14, 20–19, 24–15
Pts: Hollerl 23; Rebs: Bobb 15; Asts: Hollerl 6		Pts: Jagre 12; Rebs: Jagre, Ersdala 6 Asts: Ersdala, Blomkvist 2

Olimpia Hall
Attendance: 174
Referees: Luís Daniel Mascarenhas De Oliveira (POR), Monika Mincheva (BUL), Hasan Bajgoric (BIH)

8 August 2024
18:30

Boxscore

Iceland	67–52	Romania
Scoring by quarter: 22–15, 17–12, 17–13, 11–12
Pts: Saevarsdottir 19; Rebs: Hlynsdottir 8 Asts: Three players 2		Pts: Savu 13; Rebs: Fritea 10; Asts: Simion 3

Olimpia Hall
Attendance: 400
Referees: Stefan Stefanov (BUL), Jakub Izak (SVK), Jamie Dooley (IRL)

9 August 2024
18:30

Boxscore

Ukraine	80–62	Austria
Scoring by quarter: 14–20, 19–20, 24–15, 23–7
Pts: Tynshchuk 19; Rebs: Syniakova 10; Asts: Lavrinets 4		Pts: Hollerl 18; Rebs: Hollerl 9 Asts: Five players 2

Sala Polivalenta Blejoi
Attendance: 50
Referees: Petr Blahout (CZE), Ema Nikochevikj (MKD), Lynn Weiwers (LUX)

9 August 2024
21:00

Boxscore

Iceland	65–70	Sweden
Scoring by quarter: 10–6, 21–17, 24–17, 10–30
Pts: Armannsdottir 30; Rebs: Armannsdottir 9 Asts: Magnusdottir 4		Pts: Kajevic 17; Rebs: Blomkvist 6 Asts: Kalenga, Blomkvist 2

Sala Polivalenta Blejoi
Attendance: 50
Referees: Josh Bowe (GBR), Monika Mincheva (BUL), Mateusz Skorek (POL)

10 August 2024
18:30

Boxscore

Romania	78–70	Austria
Scoring by quarter: 24–16, 16–16, 18–12, 20–26
Pts: Savu 20; Rebs: Belegante, Savu 8 Asts: Savu 6		Pts: Hollerl 27; Rebs: Bobb 23; Asts: Reisner, Matzka 4

Sala Polivalenta Blejoi
Attendance: 214
Referees: Li Jin (CHN), Bogna Podkowinska (POL), Alexander Svendberg (NOR)

10 August 2024
21:00

Boxscore

Ukraine	69–51	Iceland
Scoring by quarter: 21–17, 15–10, 17–15, 16–9
Pts: Syniakova 17; Rebs: Vypovska 11; Asts: Tykha 4		Pts: Armannsdottir 18; Rebs: Armannsdottir 14; Asts: Agustsdottir 3

Sala Polivalenta Blejoi
Attendance: 44
Referees: Sava Cetkovic (MNE), Ema Nikochevikj (MKD), Jamie Dooley (IRL)

=== 17th place match ===
11 August 2024
13:00

Boxscore

North Macedonia	53–74	Sweden
Scoring by quarter: 19–14, 12–18, 13–17, 9–25
Pts: Pislevska 15; Rebs: Miceva 9 Asts: Milosavljevikj 3		Pts: Ersdala 14; Rebs: Vadfors 8 Asts: Three players 2

Sala Polivalenta Blejoi
Attendance: 37
Referees: Davíð Tómas Tómasson (ISL), Stefan Stefanov (BUL), Jamie Dooley (IRL)

=== 15th place match ===
11 August 2024
13:00

Boxscore

Norway	64–62	Austria
Scoring by quarter: 15–16, 16–8, 18–23, 15–15
Pts: Wikstrom 28; Rebs: Laugen 9 Asts: Blanco 3		Pts: Hollerl 19; Rebs: Bobb 15; Asts: Hollerl 5

Olimpia Hall
Attendance: 100
Referees: Petr Blahout (CZE), Monika Mincheva (BUL), Ema Nikochevikj (MKD)

=== 13th place match ===
11 August 2024
18:00

Boxscore

Denmark	59–63	Romania
Scoring by quarter: 18–23, 9–13, 22–7, 10–20
Pts: Westphall 21; Rebs: Lipscomb 9 Asts: Borges-Michaelsen 4		Pts: Savu 23; Rebs: Fritea 10; Asts: Three players 4

Sala Polivalenta Blejoi
Attendance: 70
Referees: Josh Bowe (GBR), Lynn Weiwers (LUX), Milita Stalaucinskaite (LTU)

=== 11th place match ===
11 August 2024
15:30

Boxscore

Netherlands	71–62	Iceland
Scoring by quarter: 11–15, 21–9, 19–14, 20–24
Pts: Peters 12; Rebs: Van Vliet, Peters 8 Asts: Vogelaar 5		Pts: Armannsdottir, Saevarsdottir 17; Rebs: Armannsdottir 15; Asts: Magnusdottir 5

Sala Polivalenta Blejoi
Attendance: 50
Referees: Oleksandr Dotsenko (UKR), Jakub Izak (SVK), Aikaterini Asimakaki (GRE)

=== 9th place match ===
11 August 2024
15:30

Boxscore

Ireland	73–61	Ukraine
Scoring by quarter: 24–16, 11–15, 23–18, 15–12
Pts: Prenter 19; Rebs: Tolan 11; Asts: Tolan 5		Pts: Poliantseva 23; Rebs: Syniakova 12; Asts: Three players 3

Olimpia Hall
Attendance: 100
Referees: Hasan Bajgoric (BIH), Ileana Maria Dragoi (ROU), Bilal Bardaqji (SWE)

== Championship playoffs ==
5th place match
Lithuania	73
Great Britain	62
7th place match
Slovakia	85
Bosnia and Herzegovina	47

5th–8th place semifinals
Lithuania	69
Slovakia	58
Great Britain	74
Bosnia and Herzegovina	60

Quarterfinals
A1	Bulgaria	73
B2	Lithuania	66
D1	Montenegro (OT)	65
C2	Slovakia	57
B1	Great Britain	50
A2	Greece	68
C1	Czech Republic	84
D2	Bosnia and Herzegovina	47

Semifinals
Bulgaria	50
Montenegro	56
Greece	47
Czech Republic	50

Final
Montenegro	63
Czech Republic	58
3rd place match
Bulgaria	51
Greece	70

=== Quarterfinals ===
9 August 2024
13:30

Boxscore

Montenegro	65–57 (OT)	Slovakia
Scoring by quarter: 11–13, 14–12, 10–17, 19–12, Overtime: 11–3
Pts: Radevic 23; Rebs: Andric 11; Asts: Radevic 6		Pts: Sediva 13; Rebs: Sediva 14; Asts: Duratna 4

Olimpia Hall
Attendance: 60
Referees: Yurii Shcherbak (UKR), Bogna Podkowinska (POL), Andras Mate Stretea (ROU)

9 August 2024
16:00

Boxscore

Bulgaria	73–66	Lithuania
Scoring by quarter: 21–12, 19–16, 11–27, 22–11
Pts: Manolova 25; Rebs: Manolova 12; Asts: Madankova 5		Pts: Aukstikalnyte 23; Rebs: Three players 6 Asts: Matulevicius 4

Olimpia Hall
Attendance: 80
Referees: Li Jin (CHN), Irene Frosolini (ITA), Alexander Svendberg (NOR)

9 August 2024
18:30

Boxscore

Great Britain	50–68	Greece
Scoring by quarter: 13–22, 16–13, 13–17, 8–16
Pts: Guttormsdottir Frost 13; Rebs: Cox 11; Asts: Sharpe 3		Pts: Ziaka, Cholopoulou 14; Rebs: Cholopoulou 5 Asts: Ziaka, Cholopoulou 5

Olimpia Hall
Attendance: 100
Referees: Stefan Zdravkovic (SRB), Romana Rea Car (AUT), Sava Cetkovic (MNE)

9 August 2024
21:00

Boxscore

Czech Republic	84–47	Bosnia and Herzegovina
Scoring by quarter: 21–12, 20–8, 22–12, 21–15
Pts: Blahova, Kalna 10; Rebs: Vecerova 8 Asts: Blahova 7		Pts: Mihalj 11; Rebs: Mihalj 6 Asts: Dosic 3

Olimpia Hall
Attendance: 70
Referees: Milita Stalaucinskaite (LTU), Luís Daniel Mascarenhas De Oliveira (POR), Davíð Tómas Tómasson (ISL)

=== 5th–8th place semifinals ===
10 August 2024
13:30

Boxscore

Lithuania	69–58	Slovakia
Scoring by quarter: 15–16, 14–22, 18–7, 22–13
Pts: Aukstikalnyte 32; Rebs: Matulevicius 8 Asts: Matulevicius 8		Pts: Mandelikova 12; Rebs: Sediva 6 Asts: Duratna, Tausova 3

Olimpia Hall
Attendance: 50
Referees: Stefan Zdravkovic (SRB), Monika Mincheva (BUL), Davíð Tómas Tómasson (ISL)

10 August 2024
16:00

Boxscore

Great Britain	74–60	Bosnia and Herzegovina
Scoring by quarter: 29–16, 10–9, 19–12, 16–23
Pts: Guttormsdottir Frost 22; Rebs: Cox 9 Asts: Keyes 6		Pts: Dosic 12; Rebs: Halilbasic 6 Asts: Mihalj 4

Olimpia Hall
Attendance: 50
Referees: Oleksandr Dotsenko (UKR), Irene Frosolini (ITA), Andras Mate Stretea (ROU)

=== Semifinals ===
10 August 2024
18:30

Boxscore

Bulgaria	50–56	Montenegro
Scoring by quarter: 10–8, 7–17, 19–15, 14–16
Pts: Dragoeva, Kostova 14; Rebs: Manolova 13; Asts: Dragoeva 4		Pts: Bulajic 25; Rebs: Andric 14; Asts: Radevic 6

Olimpia Hall
Attendance: 100
Referees: Sergii Zashchuk (UKR), Romana Rea Car (AUT), Mateusz Skorek (POL)

10 August 2024
21:00

Boxscore

Greece	47–50	Czech Republic
Scoring by quarter: 7–13, 13–7, 8–17, 19–13
Pts: Paraskevopoulou 13; Rebs: Paraskevopoulou 13; Asts: Ziaka, Cholopoulou 2		Pts: Zidkova 15; Rebs: Zidkova 9 Asts: Pilarova 3

Olimpia Hall
Attendance: 110
Referees: Yurii Shcherbak (UKR), Milita Stalaucinskaite (LTU), Josh Bowe (GBR)

=== 7th place match ===
11 August 2024
10:30

Boxscore

Slovakia	85–47	Bosnia and Herzegovina
Scoring by quarter: 22–13, 23–8, 24–11, 16–15
Pts: Sediva 16; Rebs: Oravcova 8 Asts: Sediva 5		Pts: Sehovic 12; Rebs: Damjanovic 12; Asts: Dosic 4

Sala Polivalenta Blejoi
Attendance: 42
Referees: Sava Cetkovic (MNE), Romana Rea Car (AUT), Mateusz Skorek (POL)

=== 5th place match ===
11 August 2024
10:30

Boxscore

Lithuania	73–62	Great Britain
Scoring by quarter: 20–7, 12–21, 23–27, 18–7
Pts: Paunksnyte 25; Rebs: Kacerauskaite 7 Asts: Aukstikalnyte, Paunksnyte 3		Pts: Cox 14; Rebs: Cox 10; Asts: Sharpe, Cox 4

Olimpia Hall
Attendance: 121
Referees: Yurii Shcherbak (UKR), Luís Daniel Mascarenhas De Oliveira (POR), Alexander Svendberg (NOR)

=== 3rd place match ===
11 August 2024
18:00

Boxscore

Bulgaria	51–70	Greece
Scoring by quarter: 11–21, 19–14, 8–19, 13–16
Pts: Manolova 14; Rebs: Madankova, Kostova 7 Asts: Madankova, Kostova 3		Pts: Paraskevopoulou 20; Rebs: Paraskevopoulou 12; Asts: Chatira, Cholopoulou 4

Olimpia Hall
Attendance: 300
Referees: Stefan Zdravkovic (SRB), Irene Frosolini (ITA), Li Jin (CHN)

=== Final ===
11 August 2024
20:30

Boxscore

Montenegro	63–58	Czech Republic
Scoring by quarter: 10–13, 21–18, 14–19, 18–8
Pts: Bulajic 19; Rebs: Andric 12; Asts: Radevic 5		Pts: Brzonova 14; Rebs: Kamenikova, Zidkova 7 Asts: Blahova 6

Olimpia Hall
Attendance: 700
Referees: Sergii Zashchuk (UKR), Bogna Podkowinska (POL), Andras Mate Stretea (ROU)

== Final standings ==
Rank	Team	Record
1st place, gold medalist(s)	Montenegro	7–0
2nd place, silver medalist(s)	Czech Republic	5–1
3rd place, bronze medalist(s)	Greece	5–2
4	Bulgaria	5–2
5	Lithuania	4–2
6	Great Britain	3–3
7	Slovakia	3–3
8	Bosnia and Herzegovina	3–4
9	Ireland	5–2
10	Ukraine	4–3
11	Netherlands	4–3
12	Iceland	2–5
13	Romania	3–4
14	Denmark	3–4
15	Norway	2–5
16	Austria	1–6
17	Sweden	2–5
18	North Macedonia	0–7

Promoted to the 2025 FIBA U18 Women's EuroBasket Division A

== Statistics and awards ==
=== Statistical leaders ===
==== Players ====
Points

Name	PPG
(Austria) Sina Hollerl	22.7
(Lithuania) Sintija Aukstikalnyte	22.5
(Montenegro) Jelena Bulajic	21.1
(Iceland) Kolbrun Armannsdottir	20.0
(Romania) Ioana Savu	17.1

Rebounds

Name	RPG
(Bulgaria) Denitsa Manolova	12.1
(Iceland) Kolbrun Armannsdottir	11.0
(Austria) Jada Bobb	10.7
(Montenegro) Ljube Andric	9.6
(Ukraine) Elina Syniakova	9.3

Assists

Name	APG
(Montenegro) Atina Radevic	4.6
(Bulgaria) Elena Dragoeva	4.3
(Bulgaria) Gergana Madankova	4.1
(Lithuania) Victorija Matulevicius	3.7
(Greece) Vasiliki Cholopoulou	3.7

Blocks

Name	BPG
(Romania) Sara Nicole Fritea	2.6
(Montenegro) Ljube Andric	1.6
(Ukraine) Polina Tupalo	1.4
(Bosnia and Herzegovina) Marija Damjanovic	1.3
(Slovakia) Natasa Tausova	1.2

Steals

Name	SPG
(Republic of Ireland) Emma Tolan	4.3
(Greece) Vasiliki Cholopoulou	4.0
(Ukraine) Polina Tupalo	3.7
(Norway) Anna Wikstrom	3.6
(Austria) Jordis Reisner	3.4

Efficiency

Name	EFFPG
(Lithuania) Sintija Aukstikalnyte	22.7
(Bulgaria) Denitsa Manolova	22.3
(Austria) Sina Hollerl	22.0
(Montenegro) Ljube Andric	17.1
(Lithuania) Daniele Paunksnyte	16.7

==== Teams ====
Points

Team	PPG
Lithuania	70.3
Ireland	69.3
Austria	68.7
Greece	68.0
Czech Republic	67.8

Rebounds

Team	RPG
Slovakia	47.5
Austria	46.7
Denmark	46.3
Netherlands	45.7
Bulgaria	45.1

Assists

Team	APG
Bulgaria	16.1
Greece	15.7
Ireland	15.6
Czech Republic	15.2
Austria	14.9

Blocks

Team	BPG
Romania	4.4
Greece	3.1
Czech Republic	3.0
Montenegro	3.0
Slovakia	3.0

Steals

Team	SPG
Greece	17.0
Ireland	15.6
Ukraine	15.6
Lithuania	15.5
Norway	14.4

Efficiency

Team	EFFPG
Greece	78.0
Czech Republic	73.8
Lithuania	73.7
Bulgaria	72.4
Ireland	72.3

=== Awards ===
The awards were announced on 11 August 2024.

Award	Player
All-Tournament Team	(Montenegro) Jelena Bulajic
All-Tournament Team	(Greece) Aristea Paraskevopoulou
All-Tournament Team	(Czech Republic) Emilie Brzonova
All-Tournament Team	(Lithuania) Sintija Aukstikalnyte
All-Tournament Team	(Austria) Sina Hollerl
Most Valuable Player	(Montenegro) Jelena Bulajic
