= Norway women's national under-18 basketball team =

Norway
- FIBA zone: FIBA Europe
- National federation: Norwegian Basketball Federation

U19 World Cup
- Appearances: None

U18 EuroBasket
- Appearances: None

U18 EuroBasket Division B
- Appearances: 11
- Medals: None

The Norway women's national under-18 basketball team is a national women's basketball team of Norway, administered by the Norwegian Basketball Federation. It represents the country in under-18 women's international basketball competitions.

== FIBA U18 Women's EuroBasket participations ==
Year	Result in Division B
2009	15th
2011	11th
2012	16th
2013	18th
2017	15th
2018	23rd

Year	Result in Division B
2019	20th
2022	17th
2023	18th
2024	15th
2025	20th

== See also ==
- Norway women's national basketball team
- Norway women's national under-16 basketball team
- Norway men's national under-18 basketball team
