= North Macedonia women's national under-18 basketball team =

National under-18 basketball team of North Macedonia

North Macedonia
- FIBA zone: FIBA Europe
- National federation: Basketball Federation of North Macedonia

U19 World Cup
- Appearances: None

U18 EuroBasket
- Appearances: None

U18 EuroBasket Division B
- Appearances: 10
- Medals: None

The North Macedonia women's national under-18 basketball team is a national basketball team of North Macedonia, administered by the Basketball Federation of North Macedonia. It represents the country in under-18 women's international basketball competitions.

== FIBA U18 Women's EuroBasket participations ==
Year	Result in Division B
2006	14th
2008	18th
2012	15th
2016	18th
2017	21st
2019	21st
2022	18th
2023	16th
2024	18th
2025	18th

== See also ==
- North Macedonia women's national basketball team
- North Macedonia women's national under-16 basketball team
- North Macedonia men's national under-18 basketball team
