= Ukraine women's national under-18 basketball team =

National basketball team of Ukraine

Ukraine
- FIBA zone: FIBA Europe
- National federation: Basketball Federation of Ukraine

U19 World Cup
- Appearances: None

U18 EuroBasket
- Appearances: 7
- Medals: None

U18 EuroBasket Division B
- Appearances: 14
- Medals: (silver) Silver: 1 (2006)

The Ukraine women's national under-18 basketball team is a national basketball team of Ukraine, administered by the Basketball Federation of Ukraine. It represents the country in under-18 women's international basketball competitions.

== FIBA U18 Women's EuroBasket participations ==
| Year | Division A | Division B |
|---|---|---|
| 1996 | 12th | |
| 2004 | 7th | |
| 2005 | | 11th |
| 2006 | | 2nd place, silver medalist(s) |
| 2007 | 5th | |
| 2008 | 11th | |
| 2009 | 8th | |
| 2010 | 7th | |
| 2011 | 15th | |
| 2012 | | 12th |
| 2013 | | 6th |

| Year | Division A | Division B |
|---|---|---|
| 2014 | | 9th |
| 2015 | | 13th |
| 2016 | | 13th |
| 2017 | | 14th |
| 2018 | | 8th |
| 2019 | | 13th |
| 2022 | | 15th |
| 2023 | | 10th |
| 2024 | | 10th |
| 2025 | | 16th |

== See also ==
- Ukraine women's national basketball team
- Ukraine women's national under-16 basketball team
- Ukraine men's national under-19 basketball team
