= Austria women's national under-18 basketball team =

Austria
- FIBA zone: FIBA Europe
- National federation: Austrian Basketball Federation

U19 World Cup
- Appearances: None

U18 EuroBasket
- Appearances: 1
- Medals: None

U18 EuroBasket Division B
- Appearances: 12
- Medals: None

The Austria women's national under-18 basketball team is a national basketball team of Austria, administered by the Austrian Basketball Federation. It represents the country in under-18 women's international basketball competitions.

== FIBA U18 Women's EuroBasket participations ==
Year	Division A	Division B
1975	12th	
2007		17th
2008		14th
2011		15th
2012		10th
2013		12th
2017		16th

Year	Division A	Division B
2018		17th
2019		17th
2022		14th
2023		15th
2024		16th
2025		19th

== See also ==
- Austria women's national basketball team
- Austria women's national under-16 basketball team
- Austria men's national under-18 basketball team
