= 2023 FIBA U18 Women's European Championship Division B =

Tournament details
- Host country: Bulgaria
- City: Sofia
- Dates: 30 June – 9 July 2023
- Teams: 18 (from 1 confederation)
- Venues: 2 (in 1 host city)

Final positions
- Champions: Croatia (3rd title)
- Runners-up: Luxembourg
- Third place: Greece

Official website
- www.fiba.basketball

The 2023 FIBA U18 Women's European Championship Division B was the 17th edition of the Division B of the European basketball championship for women's national under-18 teams. It was played from 30 June to 9 July 2023 in Sofia, Bulgaria. Croatia women's national under-18 basketball team won the tournament.

== Participating teams ==
- Austria
- Bosnia and Herzegovina ▼ (16th place, 2022 FIBA U18 Women's European Championship Division A)
- Bulgaria
- Croatia
- Denmark
- Estonia
- Great Britain
- Greece ▼ (14th place, 2022 FIBA U18 Women's European Championship Division A)
- Iceland
- Ireland
- Luxembourg
- Netherlands
- North Macedonia
- Norway
- Romania
- Slovakia
- Sweden ▼ (15th place, 2022 FIBA U18 Women's European Championship Division A)
- Ukraine

== First round ==
The draw of the first round was held on 14 February 2023 in Freising, Germany.

In the first round, the teams were drawn into four groups. The first two teams from each group advance to the quarterfinals; the other teams will play in the 9th–18th place classification groups.

All times are local (Eastern European Summer Time – UTC+3).

=== Group A ===
Pos	Team	Pld	W	L	PF	PA	PD	Pts	Qualification
1	Croatia	4	4	0	341	161	+180	8	Quarterfinals
2	Iceland	4	3	1	257	272	−15	7	Quarterfinals
3	Netherlands	4	2	2	209	227	−18	6	9th–18th place classification
4	Denmark	4	1	3	223	256	−33	5	9th–18th place classification
5	North Macedonia	4	0	4	183	297	−114	4	9th–18th place classification

Source: FIBA

30 June 2023
13:00

Boxscore

Netherlands	64–43	North Macedonia

Triaditsa Hall, Sofia

30 June 2023
15:30

Boxscore

Denmark	63–66	Iceland

Triaditsa Hall, Sofia

1 July 2023
15:30

Boxscore

Croatia	91–39	Denmark

St. George School Gym, Sofia

1 July 2023
18:00

Boxscore

Iceland	75–44	Netherlands

St. George School Gym, Sofia

2 July 2023
18:00

Boxscore

Netherlands	42–61	Croatia

St. George School Gym, Sofia

2 July 2023
20:30

Boxscore

North Macedonia	59–77	Iceland

St. George School Gym, Sofia

4 July 2023
15:30

Boxscore

Denmark	48–59	Netherlands

Triaditsa Hall, Sofia

4 July 2023
18:00

Boxscore

Croatia	83–41	North Macedonia

Triaditsa Hall, Sofia

5 July 2023
13:00

Boxscore

Iceland	39–106	Croatia

Triaditsa Hall, Sofia

5 July 2023
18:00

Boxscore

North Macedonia	40–73	Denmark

St. George School Gym, Sofia

=== Group B ===
Pos	Team	Pld	W	L	PF	PA	PD	Pts	Qualification
1	Bosnia and Herzegovina	3	3	0	179	138	+41	6	Quarterfinals
2	Ireland	3	2	1	157	159	−2	5	Quarterfinals
3	Norway	3	1	2	147	174	−27	4	9th–18th place classification
4	Great Britain	3	0	3	158	170	−12	3	9th–18th place classification

Source: FIBA

30 June 2023
13:00

Boxscore

Ireland	58–41	Norway

St. George School Gym, Sofia

30 June 2023
20:30

Boxscore

Bosnia and Herzegovina	55–48	Great Britain

Triaditsa Hall, Sofia

2 July 2023
13:00

Boxscore

Great Britain	55–58	Ireland

St. George School Gym, Sofia

2 July 2023
15:30

Boxscore

Norway	49–61	Bosnia and Herzegovina

St. George School Gym, Sofia

5 July 2023
15:30

Boxscore

Norway	57–55	Great Britain

Triaditsa Hall, Sofia

5 July 2023
20:30

Boxscore

Bosnia and Herzegovina	63–41	Ireland

Triaditsa Hall, Sofia

=== Group C ===
Pos	Team	Pld	W	L	PF	PA	PD	Pts	Qualification
1	Luxembourg	3	3	0	228	208	+20	6	Quarterfinals
2	Greece	3	2	1	177	149	+28	5	Quarterfinals
3	Austria	3	1	2	164	180	−16	4	9th–18th place classification
4	Romania	3	0	3	197	229	−32	3	9th–18th place classification

Source: FIBA

30 June 2023
15:30

Boxscore

Greece	62–63	Luxembourg

St. George School Gym, Sofia

30 June 2023
18:00

Boxscore

Romania	61–68	Austria

St. George School Gym, Sofia

2 July 2023
13:00

Boxscore

Luxembourg	92–82	Romania

Triaditsa Hall, Sofia

2 July 2023
15:30

Boxscore

Austria	32–46	Greece

Triaditsa Hall, Sofia

5 July 2023
13:00

Boxscore

Austria	64–73	Luxembourg

St. George School Gym, Sofia

5 July 2023
20:30

Boxscore

Greece	69–54	Romania

St. George School Gym, Sofia

=== Group D ===
Pos	Team	Pld	W	L	PF	PA	PD	Pts	Qualification
1	Bulgaria	4	3	1	241	208	+33	7	Quarterfinals
2	Slovakia	4	2	2	253	217	+36	6	Quarterfinals
3	Estonia	4	2	2	213	231	−18	6	9th–18th place classification
4	Ukraine	4	2	2	231	259	−28	6	9th–18th place classification
5	Sweden	4	1	3	240	263	−23	5	9th–18th place classification

Source: FIBA

30 June 2023
18:00

Boxscore

Ukraine	54–67	Bulgaria

Triaditsa Hall, Sofia

30 June 2023
20:30

Boxscore

Slovakia	53–60	Estonia

St. George School Gym, Sofia

1 July 2023
15:30

Boxscore

Sweden	72–74	Ukraine

Triaditsa Hall, Sofia

1 July 2023
18:00

Boxscore

Bulgaria	64–60	Slovakia

Triaditsa Hall, Sofia

2 July 2023
18:00

Boxscore

Estonia	37–57	Bulgaria

Triaditsa Hall, Sofia

2 July 2023
20:30

Boxscore

Slovakia	68–49	Sweden

Triaditsa Hall, Sofia

4 July 2023
15:30

Boxscore

Ukraine	44–72	Slovakia

St. George School Gym, Sofia

4 July 2023
18:00

Boxscore

Sweden	62–68	Estonia

St. George School Gym, Sofia

5 July 2023
15:30

Boxscore

Estonia	48–59	Ukraine

St. George School Gym, Sofia

5 July 2023
18:00

Boxscore

Bulgaria	53–57	Sweden

Triaditsa Hall, Sofia

== 9th–18th place classification ==
=== Group E ===
Pos	Team	Pld	W	L	PF	PA	PD	Pts	Qualification
1	Netherlands	4	4	0	274	218	+56	8	9th place match
2	Great Britain	4	2	2	230	244	−14	6	11th place match
3	Denmark	4	2	2	232	213	+19	6	13th place match
4	North Macedonia	4	1	3	217	258	−41	5	15th place match
5	Norway	4	1	3	244	264	−20	5	17th place match

Source: FIBA

6 July 2023
15:30

Boxscore

Denmark	51–58	Great Britain

Triaditsa Hall, Sofia

6 July 2023
18:00

Boxscore

Norway	57–72	North Macedonia

Triaditsa Hall, Sofia

7 July 2023
13:00

Boxscore

Netherlands	77–74	Norway

St. George School Gym, Sofia

7 July 2023
15:30

Boxscore

Great Britain	64–62	North Macedonia

St. George School Gym, Sofia

8 July 2023
13:00

Boxscore

Netherlands	74–53	Great Britain

St. George School Gym, Sofia

8 July 2023
15:30

Boxscore

Norway	56–60	Denmark

St. George School Gym, Sofia

=== Group F ===
Pos	Team	Pld	W	L	PF	PA	PD	Pts	Qualification
1	Ukraine	4	4	0	258	231	+27	8	9th place match
2	Estonia	4	2	2	234	207	+27	6	11th place match
3	Sweden	4	2	2	295	281	+14	6	13th place match
4	Austria	4	2	2	241	251	−10	6	15th place match
5	Romania	4	0	4	224	282	−58	4	17th place match

Source: FIBA

6 July 2023
15:30

Boxscore

Romania	65–78	Sweden

St. George School Gym, Sofia

6 July 2023
18:00

Boxscore

Austria	48–59	Ukraine

St. George School Gym, Sofia

7 July 2023
18:00

Boxscore

Estonia	70–35	Romania

St. George School Gym, Sofia

7 July 2023
20:30

Boxscore

Austria	74–83	Sweden

St. George School Gym, Sofia

8 July 2023
18:00

Boxscore

Ukraine	66–63	Romania

St. George School Gym, Sofia

8 July 2023
20:30

Boxscore

Estonia	48–51	Austria

St. George School Gym, Sofia

=== 17th place match ===
9 July 2023
13:00

Boxscore

Norway	67–80	Romania

St. George School Gym, Sofia

=== 15th place match ===
9 July 2023
15:30

Boxscore

North Macedonia	74–81	Austria

St. George School Gym, Sofia

=== 13th place match ===
9 July 2023
18:00

Boxscore

Denmark	62–77	Sweden

St. George School Gym, Sofia

=== 11th place match ===
9 July 2023
13:00

Boxscore

Great Britain	40–53	Estonia

Triaditsa Hall, Sofia

=== 9th place match ===
9 July 2023
15:30

Boxscore

Netherlands	66–64	Ukraine

Triaditsa Hall, Sofia

== Championship playoffs ==
5th place match
Ireland	43
Slovakia	68
7th place match
Bulgaria	69
Iceland	86

5th–8th place semifinals
Ireland	55
Bulgaria	46
Iceland	50
Slovakia	55

Quarterfinals
A1	Croatia	66
B2	Ireland	59
D1	Bulgaria	51
C2	Greece	59
B1	Bosnia and Herzegovina	65
A2	Iceland	48
C1	Luxembourg	82
D2	Slovakia	77

Semifinals
Croatia	45
Greece	41
Bosnia and Herzegovina	64
Luxembourg	65

Final
Croatia	93
Luxembourg	66
3rd place match
Greece	68
Bosnia and Herzegovina	44

=== Quarterfinals ===
7 July 2023
13:00

Boxscore

Bosnia and Herzegovina	65–48	Iceland

Triaditsa Hall, Sofia

7 July 2023
15:30

Boxscore

Luxembourg	82–77	Slovakia

Triaditsa Hall, Sofia

7 July 2023
18:00

Boxscore

Bulgaria	51–59	Greece

Triaditsa Hall, Sofia

7 July 2023
20:30

Boxscore

Croatia	66–59	Ireland

Triaditsa Hall, Sofia

=== 5th–8th place semifinals ===
8 July 2023
13:00

Boxscore

Iceland	50–55	Slovakia

Triaditsa Hall, Sofia

8 July 2023
15:30

Boxscore

Ireland	55–46	Bulgaria

Triaditsa Hall, Sofia

=== Semifinals ===
8 July 2023
18:00

Boxscore

Croatia	45–41	Greece

Triaditsa Hall, Sofia

8 July 2023
20:30

Boxscore

Bosnia and Herzegovina	64–65	Luxembourg

Triaditsa Hall, Sofia

=== 7th place match ===
9 July 2023
10:30

Boxscore

Bulgaria	69–86	Iceland

Triaditsa Hall, Sofia

=== 5th place match ===
9 July 2023
10:30

Boxscore

Ireland	43–68	Slovakia

St. George School Gym, Sofia

=== 3rd place match ===
9 July 2023
18:00

Boxscore

Greece	68–44	Bosnia and Herzegovina

Triaditsa Hall, Sofia

=== Final ===
9 July 2023
20:30

Boxscore

Croatia	93–66	Luxembourg

Triaditsa Hall, Sofia

== Final standings ==
Rank	Team
1st place, gold medalist(s)	Croatia
2nd place, silver medalist(s)	Luxembourg
3rd place, bronze medalist(s)	Greece
4	Bosnia and Herzegovina
5	Slovakia
6	Ireland
7	Iceland
8	Bulgaria
9	Netherlands
10	Ukraine
11	Estonia
12	Great Britain
13	Sweden
14	Denmark
15	Austria
16	North Macedonia
17	Romania
18	Norway

Promoted to the 2024 FIBA U18 Women's EuroBasket Division A
