= Denmark women's national under-18 basketball team =

National women's basketball team of Denmark

Denmark
- FIBA zone: FIBA Europe
- National federation: Danish Basketball Association

U19 World Cup
- Appearances: None

U18 EuroBasket
- Appearances: None

U18 EuroBasket Division B
- Appearances: 17
- Medals: None

The Denmark women's national under-18 basketball team is a national women's basketball team of Denmark, administered by the Danish Basketball Association (DBBF). It represents the country in under-18 women's international basketball competitions.

== FIBA U18 Women's EuroBasket participations ==
Year	Result in Division B
2007	18th
2008	17th
2009	9th
2010	6th
2011	10th
2012	6th
2013	15th
2014	16th
2015	8th

Year	Result in Division B
2016	14th
2017	24th
2018	13th
2019	5th
2022	16th
2023	14th
2024	14th
2025	15th

== See also ==
- Denmark women's national basketball team
- Denmark women's national under-16 basketball team
- Denmark men's national under-18 basketball team
