= Montenegro women's national under-18 basketball team =

Montenegro
- FIBA zone: FIBA Europe
- National federation: Basketball Federation of Montenegro

U19 World Cup
- Appearances: None

U18 EuroBasket
- Appearances: 1
- Medals: None

U18 EuroBasket Division B
- Appearances: 6
- Medals: (gold) Gold: 1 (2024)

The Montenegro women's national under-18 basketball team is a national basketball team of Montenegro, administered by the Basketball Federation of Montenegro. It represents the country in under-18 women's international basketball competitions.

The team was established in 2007 after the dissolution of the national team of Serbia and Montenegro.

== FIBA U18 Women's EuroBasket participations ==
Year	Division A	Division B
2007		9th
2010		10th
2012		14th
2014		6th
2018		18th
2024		1st place, gold medalist(s)
2025	8th	
2026	16th	

== See also ==
- Montenegro women's national basketball team
- Montenegro women's national under-16 basketball team
- Montenegro men's national under-19 basketball team
