= Bosnia and Herzegovina women's national under-18 basketball team =

Bosnia and Herzegovina
- FIBA zone: FIBA Europe
- National federation: Košarkaški savez Bosne i Hercegovine

U19 World Cup
- Appearances: None

U18 EuroBasket
- Appearances: 4
- Medals: None

U18 EuroBasket Division B
- Appearances: 12
- Medals: (bronze) Bronze: 1 (2016)
Home	Away

The Bosnia and Herzegovina women's national under-18 basketball team is a national basketball team of Bosnia and Herzegovina, administered by the Basketball Federation of Bosnia and Herzegovina. It represents the country in international under-18 women's basketball competitions.

== FIBA U18 Women's EuroBasket participations ==
Year	Division A	Division B	Head coach
2005		9th	
2006		6th	
2007		13th	
2008		9th	
2010		16th	
2013		5th	
2014		11th	
2015		7th	
2016		3rd place, bronze medalist(s)	
2017	12th		Goran Lojo
2018	13th		Slaviša Ožegović
2019	14th		Slaviša Ožegović
2022	16th		
2023		4th	
2024		8th	
2025		17th	

== See also ==
- Bosnia and Herzegovina women's national basketball team
- Bosnia and Herzegovina women's national under-20 basketball team
- Bosnia and Herzegovina women's national under-16 basketball team
- Bosnia and Herzegovina men's national under-18 basketball team
