= 2022 FIBA U18 Women's European Championship Division B =

Tournament details
- Host country: Bulgaria
- City: Sofia
- Dates: 30 July – 7 August 2022
- Teams: 18 (from 1 confederation)
- Venues: 2 (in 1 host city)

Final positions
- Champions: Slovenia (1st title)
- Runners-up: Portugal
- Third place: Serbia

Official website
- www.fiba.basketball

The 2022 FIBA U18 Women's European Championship Division B was the 16th edition of the Division B of the FIBA U18 Women's European Championship, the second tier of the European women's under-18 basketball championship. It was played from 30 July to 7 August 2022 in Sofia, Bulgaria. Slovenia women's national under-18 basketball team won the tournament.

== Participating teams ==
- Austria
- Bulgaria
- Croatia ▼ (15th place, 2019 FIBA U18 Women's European Championship Division A)
- Denmark
- Estonia
- Great Britain
- Iceland
- Ireland
- Luxembourg
- Netherlands
- North Macedonia
- Norway
- Portugal
- Romania
- Serbia ▼ (16th place, 2019 FIBA U18 Women's European Championship Division A)
- Slovakia
- Slovenia
- Ukraine

== First round ==
The draw of the first round was held on 15 February 2022 in Freising, Germany.

In the first round, the teams were drawn into four groups. The first two teams from each group advance to the quarterfinals; the other teams will play in the 9th–18th place classification groups.

=== Group A ===
Pos	Team	Pld	W	L	PF	PA	PD	Pts	Qualification
1	Portugal	4	4	0	291	159	+132	8	Quarterfinals
2	Croatia	4	3	1	299	194	+105	7	Quarterfinals
3	Luxembourg	4	2	2	239	276	−37	6	9th–18th place classification
4	Great Britain	4	1	3	233	260	−27	5	9th–18th place classification
5	North Macedonia	4	0	4	179	352	−173	4	9th–18th place classification

Source: FIBA

30 July 2022

Boxscore

Luxembourg	69–61	Great Britain

Universiada Hall, Sofia

30 July 2022

Boxscore

Portugal	94–27	North Macedonia

Universiada Hall, Sofia

31 July 2022

Boxscore

Croatia	51–52	Portugal

Triaditza Hall, Sofia

31 July 2022

Boxscore

North Macedonia	55–91	Luxembourg

Triaditza Hall, Sofia

1 August 2022

Boxscore

Luxembourg	47–82	Croatia

Universiada Hall, Sofia

1 August 2022

Boxscore

Great Britain	71–54	North Macedonia

Triaditza Hall, Sofia

2 August 2022

Boxscore

Portugal	78–32	Luxembourg

Triaditza Hall, Sofia

2 August 2022

Boxscore

Croatia	70–52	Great Britain

Triaditza Hall, Sofia

3 August 2022

Boxscore

Great Britain	49–67	Portugal

Universiada Hall, Sofia

3 August 2022

Boxscore

North Macedonia	43–96	Croatia

Universiada Hall, Sofia

=== Group B ===
Pos	Team	Pld	W	L	PF	PA	PD	Pts	Qualification
1	Slovenia	3	3	0	242	128	+114	6	Quarterfinals
2	Bulgaria	3	2	1	184	214	−30	5	Quarterfinals
3	Estonia	3	1	2	170	214	−44	4	9th–18th place classification
4	Ukraine	3	0	3	158	198	−40	3	9th–18th place classification

Source: FIBA

30 July 2022

Boxscore

Estonia	41–89	Slovenia

Triaditza Hall, Sofia

30 July 2022

Boxscore

Bulgaria	69–61	Ukraine

Universiada Hall, Sofia

1 August 2022

Boxscore

Ukraine	55–63	Estonia

Triaditza Hall, Sofia

1 August 2022

Boxscore

Slovenia	87–45	Bulgaria

Universiada Hall, Sofia

3 August 2022

Boxscore

Slovenia	66–42	Ukraine

Universiada Hall, Sofia

3 August 2022

Boxscore

Bulgaria	70–66	Estonia

Universiada Hall, Sofia

=== Group C ===
Pos	Team	Pld	W	L	PF	PA	PD	Pts	Qualification
1	Slovakia	3	3	0	215	174	+41	6	Quarterfinals
2	Netherlands	3	2	1	206	154	+52	5	Quarterfinals
3	Iceland	3	1	2	160	193	−33	4	9th–18th place classification
4	Norway	3	0	3	153	213	−60	3	9th–18th place classification

Source: FIBA

30 July 2022

Boxscore

Norway	39–80	Netherlands

Triaditza Hall, Sofia

30 July 2022

Boxscore

Iceland	52–75	Slovakia

Universiada Hall, Sofia

1 August 2022

Boxscore

Slovakia	82–68	Norway

Universiada Hall, Sofia

1 August 2022

Boxscore

Netherlands	72–57	Iceland

Universiada Hall, Sofia

3 August 2022

Boxscore

Iceland	51–46	Norway

Triaditza Hall, Sofia

3 August 2022

Boxscore

Netherlands	54–58	Slovakia

Triaditza Hall, Sofia

=== Group D ===
Pos	Team	Pld	W	L	PF	PA	PD	Pts	Qualification
1	Serbia	4	4	0	338	181	+157	8	Quarterfinals
2	Romania	4	2	2	221	232	−11	6	Quarterfinals
3	Ireland	4	2	2	239	246	−7	6	9th–18th place classification
4	Austria	4	2	2	221	278	−57	6	9th–18th place classification
5	Denmark	4	0	4	206	288	−82	4	9th–18th place classification

Source: FIBA

30 July 2022

Boxscore

Ireland	64–54	Denmark

Triaditza Hall, Sofia

30 July 2022

Boxscore

Austria	45–57	Romania

Triaditza Hall, Sofia

31 July 2022

Boxscore

Serbia	67–47	Ireland

Universiada Hall, Sofia

31 July 2022

Boxscore

Denmark	59–67	Austria

Universiada Hall, Sofia

1 August 2022

Boxscore

Romania	55–52	Denmark

Triaditza Hall, Sofia

1 August 2022

Boxscore

Austria	43–98	Serbia

Triaditza Hall, Sofia

2 August 2022

Boxscore

Ireland	64–66	Austria

Universiada Hall, Sofia

2 August 2022

Boxscore

Serbia	71–50	Romania

Universiada Hall, Sofia

3 August 2022

Boxscore

Denmark	41–102	Serbia

Triaditza Hall, Sofia

3 August 2022

Boxscore

Romania	59–64	Ireland

Triaditza Hall, Sofia

== 9th–18th place classification ==
=== Group E ===
Pos	Team	Pld	W	L	PF	PA	PD	Pts	Qualification
1	Luxembourg	4	4	0	299	229	+70	8	9th place match
2	Great Britain	4	3	1	277	239	+38	7	11th place match
3	Estonia	4	2	2	231	253	−22	6	13th place match
4	Ukraine	4	1	3	273	253	+20	5	15th place match
5	North Macedonia	4	0	4	213	319	−106	4	17th place match

Source: FIBA

4 August 2022

Boxscore

Great Britain	70–60	Ukraine

Universiada Hall, Sofia

4 August 2022

Boxscore

Estonia	66–57	North Macedonia

Universiada Hall, Sofia

5 August 2022

Boxscore

Luxembourg	66–46	Estonia

Triaditza Hall, Sofia

5 August 2022

Boxscore

Ukraine	91–47	North Macedonia

Triaditza Hall, Sofia

6 August 2022

Boxscore

Luxembourg	73–67	Ukraine

Triaditza Hall, Sofia

6 August 2022

Boxscore

Estonia	56–75	Great Britain

Triaditza Hall, Sofia

=== Group F ===
Pos	Team	Pld	W	L	PF	PA	PD	Pts	Qualification
1	Ireland	4	3	1	271	228	+43	7	9th place match
2	Iceland	4	3	1	232	192	+40	7	11th place match
3	Austria	4	3	1	240	239	+1	7	13th place match
4	Denmark	4	1	3	189	234	−45	5	15th place match
5	Norway	4	0	4	192	231	−39	4	17th place match

Source: FIBA

4 August 2022

Boxscore

Norway	36–41	Denmark

Triaditza Hall, Sofia

4 August 2022

Boxscore

Iceland	56–43	Austria

Triaditza Hall, Sofia

5 August 2022

Boxscore

Ireland	75–50	Norway

Triaditza Hall, Sofia

5 August 2022

Boxscore

Iceland	67–35	Denmark

Triaditza Hall, Sofia

6 August 2022

Boxscore

Austria	64–60	Norway

Triaditza Hall, Sofia

6 August 2022

Boxscore

Ireland	68–58	Iceland

Triaditza Hall, Sofia

=== 17th place match ===
7 August 2022

Boxscore

North Macedonia	49–78	Norway

Triaditza Hall, Sofia

=== 15th place match ===
7 August 2022

Boxscore

Ukraine	70–38	Denmark

Triaditza Hall, Sofia

=== 13th place match ===
7 August 2022

Boxscore

Estonia	78–64	Austria

Triaditza Hall, Sofia

=== 11th place match ===
7 August 2022

Boxscore

Great Britain	71–69	Iceland

Triaditza Hall, Sofia

=== 9th place match ===
7 August 2022

Boxscore

Luxembourg	66–70	Ireland

Universiada Hall, Sofia

== Championship playoffs ==
5th place match
C2	Netherlands	49
A2	Croatia	82
7th place match
B2	Bulgaria	65
D2	Romania	72

5th–8th place semifinals
B2	Bulgaria	61
C2	Netherlands	67
A2	Croatia	89
D2	Romania	47

Quarterfinals
A1	Portugal	65
B2	Bulgaria	48
D1	Serbia	72
C2	Netherlands	49
B1	Slovenia	59
A2	Croatia	56
C1	Slovakia	56
D2	Romania	55

Semifinals
A1	Portugal	62
D1	Serbia	55
B1	Slovenia	82
C1	Slovakia	48

Final
A1	Portugal	44
B1	Slovenia	59
3rd place match
D1	Serbia	62
C1	Slovakia	50

=== Quarterfinals ===
5 August 2022

Boxscore

Slovenia	59–56	Croatia

Universiada Hall, Sofia

5 August 2022

Boxscore

Slovakia	56–55	Romania

Universiada Hall, Sofia

5 August 2022

Boxscore

Portugal	65–48	Bulgaria

Universiada Hall, Sofia

5 August 2022

Boxscore

Serbia	72–49	Netherlands

Universiada Hall, Sofia

=== 5th–8th place semifinals ===
6 August 2022

Boxscore

Croatia	89–47	Romania

Universiada Hall, Sofia

6 August 2022

Boxscore

Bulgaria	61–67	Netherlands

Universiada Hall, Sofia

=== Semifinals ===
6 August 2022

Boxscore

Portugal	62–55	Serbia

Universiada Hall, Sofia

6 August 2022

Boxscore

Slovenia	82–48	Slovakia

Universiada Hall, Sofia

=== 7th place match ===
7 August 2022

Boxscore

Bulgaria	65–72	Romania

Universiada Hall, Sofia

=== 5th place match ===
7 August 2022

Boxscore

Netherlands	49–82	Croatia

Universiada Hall, Sofia

=== 3rd place match ===
7 August 2022

Boxscore

Serbia	62–50	Slovakia

Universiada Hall, Sofia

=== Final ===
7 August 2022

Boxscore

Portugal	44–59	Slovenia

Universiada Hall, Sofia

== Final standings ==
Rank	Team
1st place, gold medalist(s)	Slovenia
2nd place, silver medalist(s)	Portugal
3rd place, bronze medalist(s)	Serbia
4	Slovakia
5	Croatia
6	Netherlands
7	Romania
8	Bulgaria
9	Ireland
10	Luxembourg
11	Great Britain
12	Iceland
13	Estonia
14	Austria
15	Ukraine
16	Denmark
17	Norway
18	North Macedonia

Promoted to the 2023 FIBA U18 Women's European Championship Division A
