= Iceland women's national under-18 basketball team =

Iceland
- FIBA zone: FIBA Europe
- National federation: Icelandic Basketball Federation

U19 World Cup
- Appearances: None

U18 EuroBasket
- Appearances: None

U18 EuroBasket Division B
- Appearances: 12
- Medals: None

U18 EuroBasket Division C
- Appearances: 3
- Medals: (gold) Gold: 1 (2003)

The Iceland women's national under-18 basketball team is a national basketball team of Iceland, administered by the Icelandic Basketball Federation. It represents the country in under-18 women's international basketball competitions.

== FIBA U18 Women's EuroBasket participations ==
Year	Division B	Division C
1999		5th
2001		4th
2003		1st place, gold medalist(s)
2005	8th	
2006	11th	
2014	15th	
2015	17th	
2016	4th	

Year	Division B	Division C
2017	13th	
2018	19th	
2019	15th	
2022	12th	
2023	7th	
2024	12th	
2025	5th	

== See also ==
- Iceland women's national basketball team
- Iceland women's national under-16 basketball team
- Iceland men's national under-18 basketball team
