= 2014 FIBA Europe Under-18 Championship for Women Division B =

Tournament details
- Host country: Romania
- City: Timișoara, Oradea
- Dates: 17–27 July 2014
- Teams: 17 (from 1 confederation)
- Venues: 2 (in 2 host cities)

Final positions
- Champions: Hungary (2nd title)
- Runners-up: Estonia
- Third place: Israel

Official website
- www.fibaeurope.com

The 2014 FIBA Europe Under-18 Championship for Women Division B was the 10th edition of the Division B of the European basketball championship for women's national under-18 teams. It was played from 17 to 27 July 2014 in Timișoara and Oradea, Romania. Hungary women's national under-18 basketball team won the tournament.

== Participating teams ==
- Bosnia and Herzegovina
- Bulgaria
- Denmark
- England ▼ (16th place, 2013 FIBA Europe Under-18 Championship for Women Division A)
- Estonia
- Germany
- Finland
- Hungary
- Iceland
- Ireland
- Israel
- Latvia
- Luxembourg
- Montenegro
- Romania
- Switzerland
- Ukraine

== First round ==
In the first round, the teams were drawn into four groups. The first two teams from each group advance to the 1st–8th place classification; the other teams will play in the 9th–17th place classification.

=== Group A ===
Pos	Team	Pld	W	L	PF	PA	PD	Pts	Qualification
1	Latvia	3	2	1	192	148	+44	5	1st–8th place classification
2	Estonia	3	2	1	150	148	+2	5	1st–8th place classification
3	Germany	3	2	1	175	166	+9	5	9th–17th place classification
4	Ireland	3	0	3	139	194	−55	3	9th–17th place classification

Source: FIBA Archive

17 July 2014

Boxscore

Latvia	78–58	Germany

Arena Antonio Alexe, Oradea

17 July 2014

Boxscore

Ireland	55–56	Estonia

Arena Antonio Alexe, Oradea

19 July 2014

Boxscore

Germany	68–40	Ireland

Arena Antonio Alexe, Oradea

19 July 2014

Boxscore

Estonia	46–44	Latvia

Arena Antonio Alexe, Oradea

21 July 2014

Boxscore

Germany	49–48	Estonia

Arena Antonio Alexe, Oradea

21 July 2014

Boxscore

Ireland	44–70	Latvia

Arena Antonio Alexe, Oradea

=== Group B ===
Pos	Team	Pld	W	L	PF	PA	PD	Pts	Qualification
1	Finland	3	3	0	247	191	+56	6	1st–8th place classification
2	Bulgaria	3	2	1	275	242	+33	5	1st–8th place classification
3	Bosnia and Herzegovina	3	1	2	207	190	+17	4	9th–17th place classification
4	Luxembourg	3	0	3	140	246	−106	3	9th–17th place classification

Source: FIBA Archive

17 July 2014

Boxscore

Finland	105–98	Bulgaria

Arena Antonio Alexe, Oradea

17 July 2014

Boxscore

Bosnia and Herzegovina	75–42	Luxembourg

Arena Antonio Alexe, Oradea

19 July 2014

Boxscore

Bulgaria	89–80	Bosnia and Herzegovina

Arena Antonio Alexe, Oradea

19 July 2014

Boxscore

Luxembourg	41–83	Finland

Arena Antonio Alexe, Oradea

21 July 2014

Boxscore

Bosnia and Herzegovina	52–59	Finland

Arena Antonio Alexe, Oradea

21 July 2014

Boxscore

Bulgaria	88–57	Luxembourg

Arena Antonio Alexe, Oradea

=== Group C ===
Pos	Team	Pld	W	L	PF	PA	PD	Pts	Qualification
1	Israel	4	4	0	289	176	+113	8	1st–8th place classification
2	England	4	2	2	216	189	+27	6	1st–8th place classification
3	Denmark	4	2	2	212	271	−59	6	9th–17th place classification
4	Iceland	4	1	3	240	266	−26	5	9th–17th place classification
5	Switzerland	4	1	3	177	232	−55	5	9th–17th place classification

Source: FIBA Archive

17 July 2014

Boxscore

Israel	76–52	Iceland

Constantin Jude Sports Hall, Timișoara

17 July 2014

Boxscore

Denmark	40–64	England

Constantin Jude Sports Hall, Timișoara

18 July 2014

Boxscore

Switzerland	39–52	Denmark

Constantin Jude Sports Hall, Timișoara

18 July 2014

Boxscore

England	48–55	Israel

Constantin Jude Sports Hall, Timișoara

19 July 2014

Boxscore

Israel	75–43	Switzerland

Constantin Jude Sports Hall, Timișoara

19 July 2014

Boxscore

Iceland	45–57	England

Constantin Jude Sports Hall, Timișoara

20 July 2014

Boxscore

Switzerland	46–58	Iceland

Constantin Jude Sports Hall, Timișoara

20 July 2014

Boxscore

Denmark	33–83	Israel

Constantin Jude Sports Hall, Timișoara

21 July 2014

Boxscore

Iceland	85–87	Denmark

Constantin Jude Sports Hall, Timișoara

21 July 2014

Boxscore

England	47–49	Switzerland

Constantin Jude Sports Hall, Timișoara

=== Group D ===
Pos	Team	Pld	W	L	PF	PA	PD	Pts	Qualification
1	Hungary	3	3	0	228	147	+81	6	1st–8th place classification
2	Montenegro	3	2	1	193	186	+7	5	1st–8th place classification
3	Ukraine	3	1	2	163	198	−35	4	9th–17th place classification
4	Romania	3	0	3	156	209	−53	3	9th–17th place classification

Source: FIBA Archive

17 July 2014

Boxscore

Montenegro	63–45	Romania

Constantin Jude Sports Hall, Timișoara

17 July 2014

Boxscore

Ukraine	42–62	Hungary

Constantin Jude Sports Hall, Timișoara

19 July 2014

Boxscore

Hungary	79–48	Montenegro

Constantin Jude Sports Hall, Timișoara

19 July 2014

Boxscore

Romania	54–59	Ukraine

Constantin Jude Sports Hall, Timișoara

21 July 2014

Boxscore

Montenegro	82–62	Ukraine

Constantin Jude Sports Hall, Timișoara

21 July 2014

Boxscore

Hungary	87–57	Romania

Constantin Jude Sports Hall, Timișoara

== 9th–17th place classification ==
=== Group G ===
Pos	Team	Pld	W	L	PF	PA	PD	Pts	Qualification
1	Germany	2	2	0	136	89	+47	4	9th–11th place classification
2	Luxembourg	2	1	1	95	113	−18	3	12th–14th place classification
3	Switzerland	2	0	2	92	121	−29	2	15th–17th place classification

Source: FIBA Archive

22 July 2014

Boxscore

Germany	68–42	Luxembourg

Constantin Jude Sports Hall, Timișoara

23 July 2014

Boxscore

Luxembourg	53–45	Switzerland

Constantin Jude Sports Hall, Timișoara

24 July 2014

Boxscore

Switzerland	47–68	Germany

Constantin Jude Sports Hall, Timișoara

=== Group H ===
Pos	Team	Pld	W	L	PF	PA	PD	Pts	Qualification
1	Bosnia and Herzegovina	2	2	0	149	117	+32	4	9th–11th place classification
2	Romania	2	1	1	129	145	−16	3	12th–14th place classification
3	Iceland	2	0	2	137	153	−16	2	15th–17th place classification

Source: FIBA Archive

22 July 2014

Boxscore

Bosnia and Herzegovina	76–65	Iceland

Constantin Jude Sports Hall, Timișoara

23 July 2014

Boxscore

Iceland	72–77	Romania

Constantin Jude Sports Hall, Timișoara

24 July 2014

Boxscore

Romania	52–73	Bosnia and Herzegovina

Constantin Jude Sports Hall, Timișoara

=== Group I ===
Pos	Team	Pld	W	L	PF	PA	PD	Pts	Qualification
1	Ukraine	2	2	0	122	89	+33	4	9th–11th place classification
2	Ireland	2	1	1	119	111	+8	3	12th–14th place classification
3	Denmark	2	0	2	83	124	−41	2	15th–17th place classification

Source: FIBA Archive

22 July 2014

Boxscore

Denmark	33–61	Ukraine

Constantin Jude Sports Hall, Timișoara

23 July 2014

Boxscore

Ukraine	61–56	Ireland

Constantin Jude Sports Hall, Timișoara

24 July 2014

Boxscore

Ireland	63–50	Denmark

Constantin Jude Sports Hall, Timișoara

=== 9th–11th place classification ===
Pos	Team	Pld	W	L	PF	PA	PD	Pts
9	Ukraine	2	2	0	116	98	+18	4
10	Germany	2	1	1	120	118	+2	3
11	Bosnia and Herzegovina	2	0	2	111	131	−20	2

Source: FIBA Archive

25 July 2014

Boxscore

Germany	68–65	Bosnia and Herzegovina

Constantin Jude Sports Hall, Timișoara

26 July 2014

Boxscore

Bosnia and Herzegovina	46–63	Ukraine

Constantin Jude Sports Hall, Timișoara

27 July 2014

Boxscore

Ukraine	53–52	Germany

Constantin Jude Sports Hall, Timișoara

=== 12th–14th place classification ===
Pos	Team	Pld	W	L	PF	PA	PD	Pts
12	Romania	2	2	0	150	105	+45	4
13	Ireland	2	1	1	129	125	+4	3
14	Luxembourg	2	0	2	108	157	−49	2

Source: FIBA Archive

25 July 2014

Boxscore

Luxembourg	53–80	Romania

Constantin Jude Sports Hall, Timișoara

26 July 2014

Boxscore

Romania	70–52	Ireland

Constantin Jude Sports Hall, Timișoara

27 July 2014

Boxscore

Ireland	77–55	Luxembourg

Constantin Jude Sports Hall, Timișoara

=== 15th–17th place classification ===
Pos	Team	Pld	W	L	PF	PA	PD	Pts
15	Iceland	2	2	0	139	88	+51	4
16	Denmark	2	1	1	94	130	−36	3
17	Switzerland	2	0	2	97	112	−15	2

Source: FIBA Archive

25 July 2014

Boxscore

Switzerland	49–57	Iceland

Constantin Jude Sports Hall, Timișoara

26 July 2014

Boxscore

Iceland	82–39	Denmark

Constantin Jude Sports Hall, Timișoara

27 July 2014

Boxscore

Denmark	55–48	Switzerland

Constantin Jude Sports Hall, Timișoara

== 1st–8th place classification ==
=== Group E ===
Pos	Team	Pld	W	L	PF	PA	PD	Pts	Qualification
1	Estonia	3	2	1	145	158	−13	5	Championship playoffs
2	Latvia	3	2	1	179	154	+25	5	Championship playoffs
3	Finland	3	1	2	210	210	0	4	5th–8th place playoffs
4	Bulgaria	3	1	2	215	227	−12	4	5th–8th place playoffs

Source: FIBA Archive

23 July 2014

Boxscore

Latvia	75–52	Bulgaria

Arena Antonio Alexe, Oradea

23 July 2014

Boxscore

Estonia	52–49	Finland

Arena Antonio Alexe, Oradea

24 July 2014

Boxscore

Finland	56–60	Latvia

Arena Antonio Alexe, Oradea

24 July 2014

Boxscore

Bulgaria	65–47	Estonia

Arena Antonio Alexe, Oradea

=== Group F ===
Pos	Team	Pld	W	L	PF	PA	PD	Pts	Qualification
1	Hungary	3	3	0	232	146	+86	6	Championship playoffs
2	Israel	3	2	1	182	184	−2	5	Championship playoffs
3	Montenegro	3	1	2	162	190	−28	4	5th–8th place playoffs
4	England	3	0	3	130	186	−56	3	5th–8th place playoffs

Source: FIBA Archive

23 July 2014

Boxscore

Israel	77–60	Montenegro

Arena Antonio Alexe, Oradea

23 July 2014

Boxscore

England	48–77	Hungary

Arena Antonio Alexe, Oradea

24 July 2014

Boxscore

Hungary	76–50	Israel

Arena Antonio Alexe, Oradea

24 July 2014

Boxscore

Montenegro	54–34	England

Arena Antonio Alexe, Oradea

=== 5th–8th place playoffs ===
5th–8th place semifinals
E3	Finland	61
F4	England	50
F3	Montenegro	83
E4	Bulgaria	69

5th place match
E3	Finland	59
F3	Montenegro	52
7th place match
F4	England	61
E4	Bulgaria	77

==== 5th–8th place semifinals ====
26 July 2014

Boxscore

Finland	61–50	England

Arena Antonio Alexe, Oradea

26 July 2014

Boxscore

Montenegro	83–69	Bulgaria

Arena Antonio Alexe, Oradea

==== 7th place match ====
27 July 2014

Boxscore

England	61–77	Bulgaria

Arena Antonio Alexe, Oradea

==== 5th place match ====
27 July 2014

Boxscore

Finland	59–52	Montenegro

Arena Antonio Alexe, Oradea

=== Championship playoffs ===
Semifinals
E1	Estonia	63
F2	Israel	58
F1	Hungary	84
E2	Latvia	57

Final
E1	Estonia	52
F1	Hungary	58
3rd place match
F2	Israel	71
E2	Latvia	64

==== Semifinals ====
26 July 2014

Boxscore

Estonia	63–58	Israel

Arena Antonio Alexe, Oradea

26 July 2014

Boxscore

Hungary	84–57	Latvia

Arena Antonio Alexe, Oradea

==== 3rd place match ====
27 July 2014

Boxscore

Israel	71–64	Latvia

Arena Antonio Alexe, Oradea

==== Final ====
27 July 2014

Boxscore

Estonia	52–58	Hungary

Arena Antonio Alexe, Oradea

== Final standings ==
Rank	Team
1st place, gold medalist(s)	Hungary
2nd place, silver medalist(s)	Estonia
3rd place, bronze medalist(s)	Israel
4	Latvia
5	Finland
6	Montenegro
7	Bulgaria
8	England
9	Ukraine
10	Germany
11	Bosnia and Herzegovina
12	Romania
13	Ireland
14	Luxembourg
15	Iceland
16	Denmark
17	Switzerland

Promoted to the 2015 FIBA Europe Under-18 Championship for Women Division A
