= Estonia women's national under-18 basketball team =

Estonia
- FIBA zone: FIBA Europe
- National federation: Estonian Basketball Association
- Coach: Esko Tõnisson

U19 World Cup
- Appearances: None

U18 EuroBasket
- Appearances: 1
- Medals: None

U18 EuroBasket Division B
- Appearances: 13
- Medals: (silver) Silver: 1 (2014); (bronze) Bronze: 1 (2007)

U18 EuroBasket Division C
- Appearances: 1
- Medals: None

The Estonia women's national under-18 basketball team is a national basketball team of Estonia, administered by the Estonian Basketball Association. It represents the country in under-18 women's international basketball competitions.

== FIBA U18 Women's EuroBasket participations ==
Year	Division A	Division B	Division C
2005	-	4th	-
2006	-	5th	-
2007	-	3rd place, bronze medalist(s)	-
2008	-	5th	-
2010	-	13th	-
2013	-	10th	-
2014	-	2nd place, silver medalist(s)	-
2015	16th	-	-
2016	-	12th	-
2017	-	17th	-
2019	-	16th	-
2022	-	13th	-
2023	-	11th	-
2025	-	8th	-
2026	-	20th	-
2027	-	-	Q

== See also ==
- Estonia women's national basketball team
- Estonia women's national under-16 basketball team
- Estonia men's national under-18 basketball team
