= Bulgaria women's national under-18 basketball team =

Basketball team

Bulgaria
- FIBA zone: FIBA Europe
- National federation: Bulgarian Basketball Federation

U19 World Cup
- Appearances: 2
- Medals: None

U18 EuroBasket
- Appearances: 23
- Medals: (silver) Silver: 2 (1969, 1992); (bronze) Bronze: 2 (1971, 1981)

U18 EuroBasket Division B
- Appearances: 14
- Medals: None

The Bulgaria women's national under-18 and under-19 basketball team is a national basketball team of Bulgaria, administered by the Bulgarian Basketball Federation. It represents the country in under-18 and under-19 women's international basketball competitions.

== FIBA U18 Women's EuroBasket participations ==
Year	Division A
1965	5th
1967	4th
1969	2nd place, silver medalist(s)
1971	3rd place, bronze medalist(s)
1973	4th
1975	4th
1977	9th
1979	8th
1981	3rd place, bronze medalist(s)
1983	5th
1984	6th
1988	4th
1990	8th

Year	Division A	Division B
1992	2nd place, silver medalist(s)	
1994	8th	
1998	11th	
2000	11th	
2004	8th	
2005	12th	
2006	8th	
2007	13th	
2008	12th	
2009	16th	
2010		15th
2011		12th
2012		5th

Year	Division A	Division B
2013		7th
2014		7th
2015		15th
2016		15th
2017		9th
2018		20th
2019		18th
2022		8th
2023		8th
2024		4th
2025		10th

== FIBA Under-19 Women's Basketball World Cup participations ==
Year	Result
1989	11th
1993	9th

== See also ==
- Bulgaria women's national basketball team
- Bulgaria women's national under-16 basketball team
- Bulgaria men's national under-19 basketball team
