= Great Britain women's national under-18 basketball team =

Great Britain
- FIBA zone: FIBA Europe
- National federation: British Basketball

U19 World Cup
- Appearances: None

U18 EuroBasket
- Appearances: None

U18 EuroBasket Division B
- Appearances: 7
- Medals: None

The Great Britain women's national under-18 basketball team is a national basketball team of Great Britain, administered by the British Basketball. It represents the country in under-18 women's international basketball competitions.

== FIBA U18 Women's EuroBasket participations ==
Year	Result in Division B
2017	4th
2018	10th
2019	19th
2022	11th
2023	12th
2024	6th
2025	6th

== See also ==
- Great Britain women's national basketball team
- Great Britain women's national under-16 basketball team
- Great Britain men's national under-18 basketball team
