= Elena Georgieva =

Bulgarian linguist

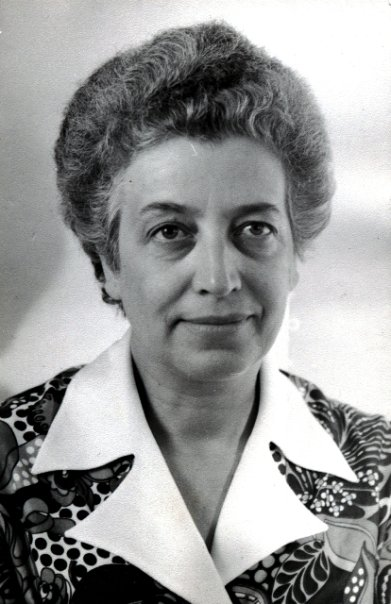
- Born: Elena Traycheva Kerpicheva; 15 March 1930; Bratsigovo, Bulgaria
- Died: 10 January 2007 (aged 76); Sofia, Bulgaria
- Other names: Елена Трайчева Георгиева
- Occupation: linguist
- Known for: Bulgarian syntax studies
- Notable work: Simple word order in sentences in Bulgarian literary language

Elena Georgieva (Bulgarian: Елена Георгиева, 15 March 1930 – 10 January 2007) was a Bulgarian linguist whose work on Bulgarian syntax revolutionized the way that the Bulgarian language was studied by proposing that the word order was determined by the functional perspective of the subject and its theme.

== Career ==
Elena Traycheva Georgieva was a student of Lyubomir Andreychin and spent her career working for the Institute for Bulgarian Language under the Bulgarian Academy of Sciences. She was the first administrative specialist assigned to the institute upon its creation. Georgieva taught at several universities, including Plovdiv University "Paisii Hilendarski" and Shumen University and lectured on the Bulgarian language in France. Georgieva's research covered a broad spectrum of modern Bulgarian language, touching on grammar, history, morphology and syntax, and she was a prolific writer of both analysis and textbooks.

In 1974, she published Simple word order in sentences in Bulgarian literary language (Bulgarian: Slovored na prostoto izrečenie v bălgarskija knižoven ezik), which had a profound impact on linguistic studies. It was not the first study of Bulgarian syntax, but it was the first study to show that word order depended not only on the subject matter but also on the intent of the message being conveyed. Instead of routinely conveying words in the format of subject, verb, object, they might be presented in another format to convey emphasis.

Georgieva was a long-time contributor to the journal Bulgarian Language and Literature (Bulgarian: Български език и литература). In addition to her own publishing, she served as both an editor and one of the writers on the most important three-volume academic publication on grammar of the Bulgarian language, Grammar of contemporary Bulgarian literary language, as well as the History of Modern Literary Language and a dictionary. She hosted a radio show, "Native Speech" for the Bulgarian National Radio.

== Selected works ==
- Обособени части в българския книжовен език [Portions on Bulgarian literary language] (in Bulgarian). Sofia, Bulgaria: Bulgarian Academy of Sciences. 1964. OCLC 494398759.
- Словоред на простото изречение в българския книжовен език [Simple word order in sentences in Bulgarian literary language] (in Bulgarian). Sofia, Bulgaria: Bulgarian Academy of Sciences. 1974. OCLC 494399439.
- Езикова култура и езиково обучение [Language Culture and Language Training] (in Bulgarian). Sofia, Bulgaria: Народна просвета. 1979. OCLC 6196232.
- Правописен речник на съвременния български книжовен език [Spelling Dictionary of Modern Bulgarian literary language] (in Bulgarian). Sofia, Bulgaria: Bulgarian Academy of Sciences. 1983. OCLC 50388102.
- Словоред на усложненото просто изречение [Word order of complex simple sentences] (in Bulgarian). Sofia, Bulgaria: Bulgarian Academy of Sciences. 1987. OCLC 580906502.
- История на новобългарския книжовен език [History of Modern Literary Language] (in Bulgarian). Sofia, Bulgaria: Bulgarian Academy of Sciences. 1989. OCLC 490295877.
- Граматика на съвременния български книжовен език В 3 т [Grammar of contemporary Bulgarian literary language in three volumes] (in Bulgarian). Sofia, Bulgaria: Абагар. 1998. ISBN 978-9-545-84241-2.
