= Kolbrún María Ármannsdóttir =

Icelandic basketball player

No. 4 – Tindastóll
- Position: Guard
- League: Úrvalsdeild kvenna

Personal information
- Born: 28 December 2007 (age 18)
- Listed height: 176 cm (5 ft 9 in)

Career information
- Playing career: 2022–present

Career history
- 2022–2025: Stjarnan
- 2025–2026: TK Hannover Luchse
- 2026–present: Tindastóll

Career highlights
- 2× Úrvalsdeild Young Player of The Year (2024, 2025); 1. deild Young Player of The Year (2023); 1. deild kvenna winner (2023)

Kolbrún María Ármannsdóttir is an Icelandic basketball player for Tindastóll of the Úrvalsdeild kvenna.

== Playing career ==
After spending her junior career with KFÍ and Stjarnan, she started her senior team career with Stjarnan in the Icelandic second-tier 1. deild kvenna during the 2022–2023 season. In 27 regular season and playoffs games, she averaged 15.3 points and 7.7 rebounds per game, helping Stjarnan winning the league and being named the 1. deild Young Player of The Year.

On 7 October 2023, at the age of 15 years, 9 months and 9 days, she became the youngest player in the Úrvalsdeild to score 31 points in a game, breaking Helena Sverrisdóttir's record from 2004. Following the season she was named the Úrvalsdeild Young Player of The Year after leading Stjarnan to the final four of the national championship.

In August 2025, Kolbrún signed with TK Hannover Luchse of the Damen-Basketball-Bundesliga.

After one season in Germany, she returned to Iceland and signed with Tindastóll.

== National team career ==
Kolbrún debuted with Iceland U-16 team during the FIBA U16 Women's European Championship 2023, Division B. She was named to the tournaments All-Star Five after averaging 13.9 points, 8.3 rebounds and 2.7 assists. On 7 November 2024, she debuted for the Iceland senior team in a 70–78 loss against Romania. Starting the game, she scored 10 points.

== Personal life ==
Kolbrún is the daughter of former player Stefanía Helga Ásmundsdóttir who won the national championship with Grindavík in 1997.
