= 2026 FIBA U18 Women's EuroBasket Division C =

International youth basketball tournament

Tournament details
- Host country: Kosovo
- City: Peja
- Dates: 21–26 July 2026
- Teams: 7 (from 1 confederation)
- Venue: 1 (in 1 host city)

Final positions
- Champions: Malta (3rd title)
- Runners-up: Cyprus
- Third place: Kosovo

Tournament statistics
- MVP: (Cyprus) Katerina Shakalli
- Top scorer: (Kosovo) Malvina Haziri

Official website
- www.fiba.basketball

The 2026 FIBA U18 Women's EuroBasket Division C was the 19th edition of the Division C of the FIBA U18 Women's EuroBasket, the third tier of the European under-18 women's basketball championship. The tournament was played in Peja, Kosovo, from 21 to 26 July 2026.

Malta secured their third overall Division C title with a victory over Cyprus in the final, 56–35.

== Participating teams ==
- Albania
- Armenia
- Cyprus
- Georgia
- Gibraltar
- Kosovo ▼ (21st place, 2025 FIBA U18 Women's EuroBasket Division B)
- Malta

== First round ==
The draw of the first round was held on 5 February 2026 in Freising, Germany.

In the first round, the teams were drawn into two groups. After a round-robin group stage, the first two teams from each group advanced to the semifinals; the other teams were dropped to the 5th–7th place classification group.

All times are local (Central European Summer Time; UTC+2).

=== Group A ===
Pos	Team	Pld	W	L	PF	PA	PD	Pts	Qualification
1	Cyprus	2	2	0	140	116	+24	4	Semifinals
2	Malta	2	1	1	130	108	+22	3	Semifinals
3	Albania	2	0	2	106	152	−46	2	5th–7th place classification

Source: FIBA

21 July 2026
14:00

Boxscore

Malta	77–43	Albania
Scoring by quarter: 12–11, 20–11, 22–8, 23–13

Palestra e Sporteve "Karagaç"

22 July 2026
14:00

Boxscore

Albania	63–75	Cyprus
Scoring by quarter: 15–19, 13–18, 19–16, 16–22

Palestra e Sporteve "Karagaç"

23 July 2026
14:00

Boxscore

Cyprus	65–53	Malta
Scoring by quarter: 11–19, 26–11, 16–9, 12–14

Palestra e Sporteve "Karagaç"

=== Group B ===
Pos	Team	Pld	W	L	PF	PA	PD	Pts	Qualification
1	Kosovo (H)	3	3	0	246	146	+100	6	Semifinals
2	Georgia	3	2	1	209	190	+19	5	Semifinals
3	Armenia	3	1	2	215	189	+26	4	5th–7th place classification
4	Gibraltar	3	0	3	114	259	−145	3	5th–7th place classification

Source: FIBA
(H) Hosts

21 July 2026
16:30

Boxscore

Armenia	83–36	Gibraltar
Scoring by quarter: 25–11, 18–14, 24–2, 16–9

Palestra e Sporteve "Karagaç"

21 July 2026
19:00

Boxscore

Kosovo	75–51	Georgia
Scoring by quarter: 18–6, 27–13, 24–16, 6–16

Palestra e Sporteve "Karagaç"

22 July 2026
16:30

Boxscore

Georgia	81–71	Armenia
Scoring by quarter: 23–13, 21–13, 18–21, 19–24

Palestra e Sporteve "Karagaç"

22 July 2026
19:00

Boxscore

Gibraltar	34–99	Kosovo
Scoring by quarter: 5–23, 16–21, 6–27, 7–28

Palestra e Sporteve "Karagaç"

23 July 2026
16:30

Boxscore

Georgia	77–44	Gibraltar
Scoring by quarter: 18–19, 14–10, 24–7, 21–8

Palestra e Sporteve "Karagaç"

23 July 2026
19:00

Boxscore

Armenia	61–72	Kosovo
Scoring by quarter: 15–18, 16–26, 13–14, 17–14

Palestra e Sporteve "Karagaç"

== 5th–7th place classification ==
Pos	Team	Pld	W	L	PF	PA	PD	Pts
5	Albania	2	2	0	162	117	+45	4
6	Armenia	2	1	1	150	114	+36	3
7	Gibraltar	2	0	2	86	167	−81	2

Source: FIBA

Note: The following match was carried over from the first round: ARM v. GIB 83–36.

25 July 2026
14:00

Boxscore

Gibraltar	50–84	Albania
Scoring by quarter: 14–26, 14–12, 14–18, 8–28

Palestra e Sporteve "Karagaç"

26 July 2026
14:00

Boxscore

Albania	78–67	Armenia
Scoring by quarter: 22–16, 22–17, 20–18, 14–16

Palestra e Sporteve "Karagaç"

== Championship playoffs ==
Semifinals
A1	Cyprus	67
B2	Georgia	52
B1	Kosovo	48
A2	Malta	49

Final
Cyprus	35
Malta	56
3rd place match
Georgia	58
Kosovo	74

=== Semifinals ===
25 July 2026
16:30

Boxscore

Cyprus	67–52	Georgia
Scoring by quarter: 15–13, 16–6, 23–17, 13–16

Palestra e Sporteve "Karagaç"

25 July 2026
19:00

Boxscore

Kosovo	48–49	Malta
Scoring by quarter: 14–8, 8–16, 15–15, 11–10

Palestra e Sporteve "Karagaç"

=== 3rd place match ===
26 July 2026
16:30

Boxscore

Georgia	58–74	Kosovo
Scoring by quarter: 18–23, 10–22, 14–15, 16–14

Palestra e Sporteve "Karagaç"

=== Final ===
26 July 2026
19:00

Boxscore

Cyprus	35–56	Malta
Scoring by quarter: 3–9, 2–15, 20–17, 10–15

Palestra e Sporteve "Karagaç"

== Final standings ==
Rank	Team
1	Malta
2	Cyprus
3	Kosovo
4	Georgia
5	Albania
6	Armenia
7	Gibraltar

Promoted to the 2027 FIBA U18 Women's EuroBasket Division B

== Awards ==
At the conclusion of the tournament, the Most Valuable Player (MVP) award and the All-Star Five selections were announced.

Award	Player
All-Star Five	(Cyprus) Katerina Shakalli
All-Star Five	(Kosovo) Malvina Haziri
All-Star Five	(Malta) Caitlyn Grima
All-Star Five	(Malta) Claire Portelli
All-Star Five	(Georgia (country)) Nitsa Sabadashvili
Most Valuable Player	(Cyprus) Katerina Shakalli
