= 1997 European Promotion Cup for Junior Women =

International basketball tournament

Tournament details
- Host country: Malta
- City: Rabat
- Dates: 15–19 July 1997
- Teams: 8 (from 1 confederation)
- Venue(s): 1 (in 1 host city)

Final positions
- Champions: Ireland (1st title)
- Runners-up: England
- Third place: Armenia

The 1997 European Promotion Cup for Junior Women was the first edition of the basketball European Promotion Cup for U18 women's teams, today known as the FIBA U18 Women's European Championship Division C. It was played in Rabat, Malta, from 15 to 19 July 1997. Ireland women's national under-18 basketball team won the tournament.

== Participating teams ==
- Andorra
- Armenia
- England
- Gibraltar
- Ireland
- Malta
- Scotland
- Wales

== First round ==
=== Group A ===
Pos	Team	Pld	W	L	PF	PA	PD	Pts	Qualification
1	Ireland	3	3	0	285	96	+189	6	Semifinals
2	Armenia	3	2	1	241	133	+108	5	Semifinals
3	Malta	3	1	2	154	181	−27	4	5th–8th place playoffs
4	Gibraltar	3	0	3	67	337	−270	3	5th–8th place playoffs

Source: FIBA Archive

15 July 1997

Boxscore

Gibraltar	10–115	Ireland

15 July 1997

Boxscore

Malta	37–50	Armenia

16 July 1997

Boxscore

Armenia	131–23	Gibraltar

16 July 1997

Boxscore

Ireland	97–26	Malta

17 July 1997

Boxscore

Armenia	60–73	Ireland

17 July 1997

Boxscore

Gibraltar	34–91	Malta

=== Group B ===
Pos	Team	Pld	W	L	PF	PA	PD	Pts	Qualification
1	England	3	3	0	219	144	+75	6	Semifinals
2	Scotland	3	2	1	226	145	+81	5	Semifinals
3	Andorra	3	1	2	153	161	−8	4	5th–8th place playoffs
4	Wales	3	0	3	91	239	−148	3	5th–8th place playoffs

Source: FIBA Archive

15 July 1997

Boxscore

Andorra	42–64	Scotland

15 July 1997

Boxscore

Wales	32–78	England

16 July 1997

Boxscore

England	64–45	Andorra

16 July 1997

Boxscore

Scotland	95–26	Wales

17 July 1997

Boxscore

Andorra	66–33	Wales

17 July 1997

Boxscore

England	77–67	Scotland

== 5th–8th place playoffs ==
5th–8th place semifinals
A4	Gibraltar	14
B3	Andorra	68
B4	Wales	42
A3	Malta	69

5th place match
B3	Andorra	60
A3	Malta	39
7th place match
A4	Gibraltar	49
B4	Wales	69

=== 5th–8th place semifinals ===
18 July 1997

Boxscore

Gibraltar	14–68	Andorra

18 July 1997

Boxscore

Wales	42–69	Malta

=== 7th place match ===
19 July 1997

Boxscore

Gibraltar	49–69	Wales

=== 5th place match ===
19 July 1997

Boxscore

Andorra	60–39	Malta

== Championship playoffs ==
Semifinals
A2	Armenia	66
B1	England	68
B2	Scotland	80
A1	Ireland	100

Final
B1	England	58
A1	Ireland	69
3rd place match
A2	Armenia	89
B2	Scotland	78

=== Semifinals ===
18 July 1997

Boxscore

Armenia	66–68	England

18 July 1997

Boxscore

Scotland	80–100	Ireland

=== 3rd place match ===
19 July 1997

Boxscore

Armenia	89–78	Scotland

=== Final ===
19 July 1997

Boxscore

England	58–69	Ireland

== Final standings ==
Rank	Team
1st place, gold medalist(s)	Ireland
2nd place, silver medalist(s)	England
3rd place, bronze medalist(s)	Armenia
4	Scotland
5	Andorra
6	Malta
7	Wales
8	Gibraltar
