= 2005 Under-18 European Promotion Cup for Women =

European basketball tournament

Tournament details
- Host country: Scotland
- Dates: 11–16 July 2005
- Teams: 8 (from 1 confederation)
- Venue(s): 1 (in 1 host city)

Final positions
- Champions: Scotland (2nd title)
- Runners-up: Luxembourg
- Third place: Albania

The 2005 Under-18 European Promotion Cup for Women was the fifth edition of the basketball European Promotion Cup for U18 women's teams, today known as the FIBA U18 Women's European Championship Division C. It was played in Scotland from 11 to 16 July 2005. The host team, Scotland, won the tournament.

== Participating teams ==
- Albania
- Andorra
- Gibraltar
- Luxembourg
- Malta
- Monaco
- Scotland
- Wales

== First round ==
=== Group A ===
Pos	Team	Pld	W	L	PF	PA	PD	Pts	Qualification
1	Luxembourg	3	3	0	237	110	+127	6	Semifinals
2	Albania	3	2	1	294	166	+128	5	Semifinals
3	Wales	3	1	2	105	209	−104	4	5th–8th place playoffs
4	Gibraltar	3	0	3	98	249	−151	3	5th–8th place playoffs

Source: FIBA Archive

11 July 2005

Boxscore

Gibraltar	49–116	Albania

11 July 2005

Boxscore

Wales	26–66	Luxembourg

12 July 2005

Boxscore

Luxembourg	94–16	Gibraltar

12 July 2005

Boxscore

Albania	110–40	Wales

13 July 2005

Boxscore

Wales	39–33	Gibraltar

13 July 2005

Boxscore

Luxembourg	77–68	Albania

=== Group B ===
Pos	Team	Pld	W	L	PF	PA	PD	Pts	Qualification
1	Scotland	3	3	0	218	91	+127	6	Semifinals
2	Malta	3	2	1	169	110	+59	5	Semifinals
3	Andorra	3	1	2	94	152	−58	4	5th–8th place playoffs
4	Monaco	3	0	3	78	206	−128	3	5th–8th place playoffs

Source: FIBA Archive

11 July 2005

Boxscore

Scotland	55–37	Malta

11 July 2005

Boxscore

Andorra	33–30	Monaco

12 July 2005

Boxscore

Andorra	27–62	Scotland

12 July 2005

Boxscore

Monaco	21–72	Malta

13 July 2005

Boxscore

Scotland	101–27	Monaco

13 July 2005

Boxscore

Malta	60–34	Andorra

== 5th–8th place playoffs ==
5th–8th place playoffs
A3	Wales	28
B4	Monaco	44
B3	Andorra	36
A4	Gibraltar	25

5th place match
B4	Monaco	37
B3	Andorra	43
7th place match
A3	Wales	46
A4	Gibraltar	54

=== 5th–8th place semifinals ===
15 July 2005

Boxscore

Andorra	36–25	Gibraltar

15 July 2005

Boxscore

Wales	28–44	Monaco

=== 7th place match ===
16 July 2005

Boxscore

Wales	46–54	Gibraltar

=== 5th place match ===
16 July 2005

Boxscore

Monaco	37–43	Andorra

== Championship playoffs ==
Semifinals
A1	Luxembourg	68
B2	Malta	66
B1	Scotland	99
A2	Albania	63

Final
A1	Luxembourg	57
B1	Scotland	59
3rd place match
B2	Malta	62
A2	Albania	72

=== Semifinals ===
15 July 2005

Boxscore

Scotland	99–63	Albania

15 July 2005

Boxscore

Luxembourg	68–66	Malta

=== 3rd place match ===
16 July 2005

Boxscore

Malta	62–72	Albania

=== Final ===
16 July 2005

Boxscore

Luxembourg	57–59	Scotland

== Final standings ==
Rank	Team
1st place, gold medalist(s)	Scotland
2nd place, silver medalist(s)	Luxembourg
3rd place, bronze medalist(s)	Albania
4	Malta
5	Andorra
6	Monaco
7	Gibraltar
8	Wales
