= 2016 FIBA U18 Women's European Championship Division C =

International basketball tournament

Tournament details
- Host country: Georgia
- City: Tbilisi
- Dates: 8–13 July 2016
- Teams: 7 (from 1 confederation)
- Venue(s): 1 (in 1 host city)

Final positions
- Champions: Armenia (1st title)
- Runners-up: Georgia
- Third place: Malta

Official website
- www.fiba.basketball

The 2016 FIBA U18 Women's European Championship Division C was the 11th edition of the Division C of the FIBA U18 Women's European Championship, the third tier of the European women's under-18 basketball championship. It was played in Tbilisi, Georgia, from 8 to 13 July 2016. Armenia women's national under-18 basketball team won the tournament.

== Participating teams ==
- Andorra
- Armenia
- Georgia
- Gibraltar
- Kosovo
- Malta
- Wales

== First round ==
=== Group A ===
Pos	Team	Pld	W	L	PF	PA	PD	Pts	Qualification
1	Armenia	2	2	0	136	68	+68	4	Semifinals
2	Andorra	2	1	1	112	89	+23	3	Semifinals
3	Wales	2	0	2	51	142	−91	2	5th–7th place classification

Source: FIBA

8 July 2016

Boxscore

Armenia	66–40	Andorra

Olympic Palace

9 July 2016

Boxscore

Andorra	72–23	Wales

Olympic Palace

10 July 2016

Boxscore

Wales	28–70	Armenia

Olympic Palace

=== Group B ===
Pos	Team	Pld	W	L	PF	PA	PD	Pts	Qualification
1	Georgia	3	3	0	212	130	+82	6	Semifinals
2	Malta	3	2	1	169	134	+35	5	Semifinals
3	Kosovo	3	1	2	175	149	+26	4	5th–7th place classification
4	Gibraltar	3	0	3	93	236	−143	3	5th–7th place classification

Source: FIBA

8 July 2016

Boxscore

Malta	65–32	Gibraltar

Olympic Palace

8 July 2016

Boxscore

Georgia	65–49	Kosovo

Olympic Palace

9 July 2016

Boxscore

Kosovo	47–53	Malta

Olympic Palace

9 July 2016

Boxscore

Gibraltar	30–92	Georgia

Olympic Palace

10 July 2016

Boxscore

Gibraltar	31–79	Kosovo

Olympic Palace

10 July 2016

Boxscore

Georgia	55–51	Malta

Olympic Palace

== 5th–7th place classification ==
=== Group C ===
Pos	Team	Pld	W	L	PF	PA	PD	Pts
5	Kosovo	2	2	0	150	62	+88	4
6	Wales	2	1	1	72	108	−36	3
7	Gibraltar	2	0	2	68	120	−52	2

Source: FIBA

12 July 2016

Boxscore

Gibraltar	37–41	Wales

Olympic Palace

13 July 2016

Boxscore

Wales	31–71	Kosovo

Olympic Palace

== Championship playoffs ==
Semifinals
A1	Armenia	59
B2	Malta	43
B1	Georgia	77
A2	Andorra	67

Final
A1	Armenia	66
B1	Georgia	32
3rd place match
B2	Malta	71
A2	Andorra	63

=== Semifinals ===
12 July 2016

Boxscore

Armenia	59–43	Malta

Olympic Palace

12 July 2016

Boxscore

Georgia	77–67	Andorra

Olympic Palace

=== 3rd place match ===
13 July 2016

Boxscore

Malta	71–63	Andorra

Olympic Palace

=== Final ===
13 July 2016

Boxscore

Armenia	66–32	Georgia

Olympic Palace

== Final standings ==
Rank	Team
1st place, gold medalist(s)	Armenia
2nd place, silver medalist(s)	Georgia
3rd place, bronze medalist(s)	Malta
4	Andorra
5	Kosovo
6	Wales
7	Gibraltar
