= Yugoslavia women's national under-18 basketball team =

Yugoslavia
- FIBA zone: FIBA Europe
- National federation: Basketball Federation of Yugoslavia

Europe Championship
- Appearances: 13
- Medals: Gold: 1984; Silver: 1965, 1973, 1986; Bronze: 1967, 1969, 1988
Home	Away

The Yugoslavia women's national under-18 basketball team (Serbo-Croatian: Juniorska košarkaška reprezentacija Jugoslavije) was the girls' basketball team, administered by Basketball Federation of Yugoslavia, that represented SFR Yugoslavia in international under-18 (under age 18) women's basketball competitions, consisted mainly of the European Championship for Juniors, nowadays known as the FIBA Europe Under-18 Championship for Women.

After the dissolution of SFR Yugoslavia in 1991, the successor countries all set up their own national under-18 teams. Serbia team won the Championship two times, as of 2017.

== Individual awards ==
Top Scorer

- Marija Veger – 1965
- Razija Mujanović – 1986

== European Championship competitive record ==
Year	Pos.	GP	W	L	Ref.
(Bulgaria) 1965	Silver medal	7	5	2	
(Italy) 1967	Bronze medal	8	5	3	
(Germany) 1969	Bronze medal	7	5	2	
(Socialist Federal Republic of Yugoslavia) 1971	5th	7	5	2	
(Italy) 1973	Silver medal	7	5	2	
(Spain) 1975	7th	7	4	3	
(Bulgaria) 1977	4th	7	4	3	
(Italy) 1979	4th	7	4	3	
(Hungary) 1981	6th	7	3	4	
(Italy) 1983	4th	7	4	3	
(Spain) 1984	Gold medal	7	7	0	
(Italy) 1986	Silver medal	7	6	1	
(Bulgaria) 1988	Bronze medal	7	5	2	
(Spain) 1990	Did not qualify				
Total	13/14	92	62	30	

== Coaches ==
Years	Head coach	Assistant coach(es)
1965	Boris Sinković	
1967–1969	Borivoje Cenić	
1971	Marijan Pasarić	
1973	Borivoje Cenić	
1975	Marijan Pasarić	
1977–1979	Borislav Ćorković	
1981	Marijan Pasarić	
1983	Dragoljub Pljakić	
1984	Vjećeslav Kavedžija	
1986	Milan Vasojević	
1988	Miodrag Vesković	Zoran Kovačić

== New national teams ==
After the dissolution of SFR Yugoslavia in 1991, five new countries were created: Bosnia and Herzegovina, Croatia, FYR Macedonia, FR Yugoslavia (in 2003, renamed to Serbia and Montenegro) and Slovenia. In 2006, Montenegro became an independent nation and Serbia became the legal successor of Serbia and Montenegro. In 2008, Kosovo declared independence from Serbia and became a FIBA member in 2015.

Here is a list of women's national under-18 teams on the SFR Yugoslavia area:

- Bosnia and Herzegovina (1992–present)
- Croatia (1992–present)
- North Macedonia (1993–present)
- Serbia and Montenegro (1992–2006)
  - Montenegro (2006–present)
  - Serbia (2006–present)
    - Kosovo (2015–present)
- Slovenia (1992–present)

== See also ==
- Yugoslavia women's national under-19 basketball team
- Yugoslavia women's national under-16 basketball team
