= 2015 FIBA Europe Under-18 Championship for Women Division B =

Tournament details
- Host country: Romania
- City: Bucharest
- Dates: 30 July – 9 August 2015
- Teams: 20 (from 1 confederation)
- Venues: 2 (in 1 host city)

Final positions
- Champions: Slovakia (1st title)
- Runners-up: Latvia
- Third place: Turkey

Official website
- archive.fiba.com

The 2015 FIBA Europe Under-18 Championship for Women Division B was the 11th edition of the Division B of the European basketball championship for women's national under-18 teams. It was played from 30 July to 9 August 2015 in Bucharest, Romania. Slovakia women's national under-18 basketball team won the tournament.

== Participating teams ==
- Albania
- Belarus
- Bosnia and Herzegovina
- Bulgaria
- Cyprus ▲ (Winners, 2014 FIBA Europe Under-18 Championship for Women Division C)
- Denmark
- England
- Finland
- Germany
- Greece ▼ (14th place, 2014 FIBA Europe Under-18 Championship for Women Division A)
- Iceland
- Ireland
- Latvia
- Luxembourg
- Romania
- Slovakia
- Sweden ▼ (16th place, 2014 FIBA Europe Under-18 Championship for Women Division A)
- Switzerland
- Turkey ▼ (15th place, 2014 FIBA Europe Under-18 Championship for Women Division A)
- Ukraine

== First round ==
In the first round, the teams were drawn into four groups of five. The first two teams from each group advance to the 1st–8th place classification; the third and fourth teams advance to the 9th–16th place classification; the fifth teams will play in the 17th–20th place classification group.

=== Group A ===
Pos	Team	Pld	W	L	PF	PA	PD	Pts	Qualification
1	Sweden	4	4	0	287	166	+121	8	1st–8th place classification
2	Turkey	4	3	1	279	175	+104	7	1st–8th place classification
3	Belarus	4	2	2	274	203	+71	6	9th–16th place classification
4	Switzerland	4	1	3	216	204	+12	5	9th–16th place classification
5	Albania	4	0	4	95	403	−308	4	17th–20th place classification

Source: FIBA Archive

30 July 2015

Boxscore

Belarus	67–51	Switzerland

Arena de Baschet

30 July 2015

Boxscore

Turkey	51–61	Sweden

Dinamo Polyvalent Hall

31 July 2015

Boxscore

Albania	21–100	Belarus

Arena de Baschet

31 July 2015

Boxscore

Switzerland	33–53	Turkey

Dinamo Polyvalent Hall

1 August 2015

Boxscore

Sweden	62–37	Switzerland

Arena de Baschet

1 August 2015

Boxscore

Turkey	102–31	Albania

Arena de Baschet

2 August 2015

Boxscore

Belarus	50–73	Turkey

Dinamo Polyvalent Hall

2 August 2015

Boxscore

Albania	21–106	Sweden

Dinamo Polyvalent Hall

3 August 2015

Boxscore

Switzerland	95–22	Albania

Arena de Baschet

3 August 2015

Boxscore

Sweden	58–57	Belarus

Arena de Baschet

=== Group B ===
Pos	Team	Pld	W	L	PF	PA	PD	Pts	Qualification
1	Romania	4	4	0	257	219	+38	8	1st–8th place classification
2	Denmark	4	3	1	270	248	+22	7	1st–8th place classification
3	Greece	4	2	2	246	241	+5	6	9th–16th place classification
4	Luxembourg	4	1	3	238	257	−19	5	9th–16th place classification
5	Iceland	4	0	4	187	233	−46	4	17th–20th place classification

Source: FIBA Archive

30 July 2015

Boxscore

Luxembourg	53–62	Romania

Arena de Baschet

30 July 2015

Boxscore

Denmark	72–62	Greece

Arena de Baschet

31 July 2015

Boxscore

Romania	70–61	Denmark

Arena de Baschet

31 July 2015

Boxscore

Iceland	41–52	Luxembourg

Arena de Baschet

1 August 2015

Boxscore

Greece	49–62	Romania

Arena de Baschet

1 August 2015

Boxscore

Denmark	55–47	Iceland

Arena de Baschet

2 August 2015

Boxscore

Luxembourg	69–82	Denmark

Dinamo Polyvalent Hall

2 August 2015

Boxscore

Iceland	43–63	Greece

Dinamo Polyvalent Hall

3 August 2015

Boxscore

Romania	63–56	Iceland

Arena de Baschet

3 August 2015

Boxscore

Greece	72–64	Luxembourg

Arena de Baschet

=== Group C ===
Pos	Team	Pld	W	L	PF	PA	PD	Pts	Qualification
1	Slovakia	4	4	0	273	171	+102	8	1st–8th place classification
2	Germany	4	3	1	251	198	+53	7	1st–8th place classification
3	Finland	4	2	2	245	209	+36	6	9th–16th place classification
4	Ukraine	4	1	3	223	232	−9	5	9th–16th place classification
5	Cyprus	4	0	4	140	322	−182	4	17th–20th place classification

Source: FIBA Archive

30 July 2015

Boxscore

Finland	40–53	Slovakia

Dinamo Polyvalent Hall

30 July 2015

Boxscore

Ukraine	42–70	Germany

Dinamo Polyvalent Hall

31 July 2015

Boxscore

Cyprus	35–75	Ukraine

Dinamo Polyvalent Hall

31 July 2015

Boxscore

Germany	67–61	Finland

Arena de Baschet

1 August 2015

Boxscore

Slovakia	59–45	Germany

Dinamo Polyvalent Hall

1 August 2015

Boxscore

Finland	88–39	Cyprus

Dinamo Polyvalent Hall

2 August 2015

Boxscore

Ukraine	50–56	Finland

Arena de Baschet

2 August 2015

Boxscore

Cyprus	30–90	Slovakia

Arena de Baschet

3 August 2015

Boxscore

Germany	69–36	Cyprus

Dinamo Polyvalent Hall

3 August 2015

Boxscore

Slovakia	71–56	Ukraine

Dinamo Polyvalent Hall

=== Group D ===
Pos	Team	Pld	W	L	PF	PA	PD	Pts	Qualification
1	Latvia	4	4	0	275	150	+125	8	1st–8th place classification
2	Bosnia and Herzegovina	4	3	1	237	221	+16	7	1st–8th place classification
3	England	4	2	2	207	205	+2	6	9th–16th place classification
4	Bulgaria	4	1	3	202	243	−41	5	9th–16th place classification
5	Ireland	4	0	4	171	273	−102	4	17th–20th place classification

Source: FIBA Archive

30 July 2015

Boxscore

England	71–54	Ireland

Arena de Baschet

30 July 2015

Boxscore

Bulgaria	39–74	Latvia

Dinamo Polyvalent Hall

31 July 2015

Boxscore

Bosnia and Herzegovina	55–47	England

Dinamo Polyvalent Hall

31 July 2015

Boxscore

Ireland	45–64	Bulgaria

Dinamo Polyvalent Hall

1 August 2015

Boxscore

Latvia	72–30	Ireland

Dinamo Polyvalent Hall

1 August 2015

Boxscore

Bulgaria	61–68	Bosnia and Herzegovina

Dinamo Polyvalent Hall

2 August 2015

Boxscore

England	56–38	Bulgaria

Arena de Baschet

2 August 2015

Boxscore

Bosnia and Herzegovina	48–71	Latvia

Arena de Baschet

3 August 2015

Boxscore

Latvia	58–33	England

Dinamo Polyvalent Hall

3 August 2015

Boxscore

Ireland	42–66	Bosnia and Herzegovina

Dinamo Polyvalent Hall

== 17th–20th place classification ==
=== Group I ===
Pos	Team	Pld	W	L	PF	PA	PD	Pts
17	Iceland	3	3	0	205	137	+68	6
18	Ireland	3	2	1	233	174	+59	5
19	Cyprus	3	1	2	162	211	−49	4
20	Albania	3	0	3	154	232	−78	3

Source: FIBA Archive

5 August 2015

Boxscore

Albania	47–78	Ireland

Dinamo Polyvalent Hall

5 August 2015

Boxscore

Iceland	64–22	Cyprus

Arena de Baschet

7 August 2015

Boxscore

Ireland	65–71	Iceland

Arena de Baschet

7 August 2015

Boxscore

Cyprus	84–57	Albania

Arena de Baschet

9 August 2015

Boxscore

Albania	50–70	Iceland

Arena de Baschet

9 August 2015

Boxscore

Cyprus	56–90	Ireland

Arena de Baschet

== 9th–16th place classification ==
=== Group G ===
Pos	Team	Pld	W	L	PF	PA	PD	Pts	Qualification
1	Greece	3	2	1	161	155	+6	5	9th–12th place playoffs
2	Belarus	3	2	1	191	145	+46	5	9th–12th place playoffs
3	Luxembourg	3	1	2	158	186	−28	4	13th–16th place playoffs
4	Switzerland	3	1	2	132	156	−24	4	13th–16th place playoffs

Source: FIBA Archive

5 August 2015

Boxscore

Belarus	82–43	Luxembourg

Dinamo Polyvalent Hall

5 August 2015

Boxscore

Switzerland	49–38	Greece

Dinamo Polyvalent Hall

6 August 2015

Boxscore

Greece	51–42	Belarus

Dinamo Polyvalent Hall

6 August 2015

Boxscore

Luxembourg	51–32	Switzerland

Dinamo Polyvalent Hall

=== Group H ===
Pos	Team	Pld	W	L	PF	PA	PD	Pts	Qualification
1	Finland	3	3	0	158	141	+17	6	9th–12th place playoffs
2	England	3	2	1	155	125	+30	5	9th–12th place playoffs
3	Ukraine	3	1	2	175	164	+11	4	13th–16th place playoffs
4	Bulgaria	3	0	3	138	196	−58	3	13th–16th place playoffs

Source: FIBA Archive

5 August 2015

Boxscore

Finland	60–50	Bulgaria

Dinamo Polyvalent Hall

5 August 2015

Boxscore

Ukraine	45–58	England

Dinamo Polyvalent Hall

6 August 2015

Boxscore

England	41–42	Finland

Dinamo Polyvalent Hall

6 August 2015

Boxscore

Bulgaria	50–80	Ukraine

Dinamo Polyvalent Hall

=== 13th–16th place playoffs ===
13th–16th place semifinals
G3	Luxembourg	67
H4	Bulgaria	61
H3	Ukraine	59
G4	Switzerland	32

13th place match
G3	Luxembourg	41
H3	Ukraine	61
15th place match
H4	Bulgaria	58
G4	Switzerland	52

==== 13th–16th place semifinals ====
8 August 2015

Boxscore

Luxembourg	67–61	Bulgaria

Arena de Baschet

8 August 2015

Boxscore

Ukraine	59–32	Switzerland

Arena de Baschet

==== 15th place match ====
9 August 2015

Boxscore

Bulgaria	58–52	Switzerland

Arena de Baschet

==== 13th place match ====
9 August 2015

Boxscore

Luxembourg	41–61	Ukraine

Arena de Baschet

=== 9th–12th place playoffs ===
9th–12th place semifinals
G1	Greece	60
H2	England	47
H1	Finland	62
G2	Belarus	50

9th place match
G1	Greece	53
H1	Finland	56
11th place match
H2	England	50
G2	Belarus	68

==== 9th–12th place semifinals ====
8 August 2015

Boxscore

Greece	60–47	England

Arena de Baschet

8 August 2015

Boxscore

Finland	62–50	Belarus

Arena de Baschet

==== 11th place match ====
9 August 2015

Boxscore

England	50–68	Belarus

Arena de Baschet

==== 9th place match ====
9 August 2015

Boxscore

Greece	53–56	Finland

Dinamo Polyvalent Hall

== 1st–8th place classification ==
=== Group E ===
Pos	Team	Pld	W	L	PF	PA	PD	Pts	Qualification
1	Sweden	3	3	0	152	115	+37	6	Championship playoffs
2	Turkey	3	2	1	201	161	+40	5	Championship playoffs
3	Romania	3	1	2	162	164	−2	4	5th–8th place playoffs
4	Denmark	3	0	3	133	208	−75	3	5th–8th place playoffs

Source: FIBA Archive

5 August 2015

Boxscore

Sweden	49–27	Denmark

Arena de Baschet

5 August 2015

Boxscore

Turkey	61–55	Romania

Arena de Baschet

6 August 2015

Boxscore

Denmark	45–89	Turkey

Arena de Baschet

6 August 2015

Boxscore

Romania	37–42	Sweden

Arena de Baschet

=== Group F ===
Pos	Team	Pld	W	L	PF	PA	PD	Pts	Qualification
1	Latvia	3	3	0	181	136	+45	6	Championship playoffs
2	Slovakia	3	2	1	167	135	+32	5	Championship playoffs
3	Germany	3	1	2	165	182	−17	4	5th–8th place playoffs
4	Bosnia and Herzegovina	3	0	3	151	211	−60	3	5th–8th place playoffs

Source: FIBA Archive

5 August 2015

Boxscore

Slovakia	69–49	Bosnia and Herzegovina

Arena de Baschet

5 August 2015

Boxscore

Germany	49–69	Latvia

Arena de Baschet

6 August 2015

Boxscore

Latvia	41–39	Slovakia

Arena de Baschet

6 August 2015

Boxscore

Bosnia and Herzegovina	54–71	Germany

Arena de Baschet

=== 5th–8th place playoffs ===
5th–8th place semifinals
E3	Romania	60
F4	Bosnia and Herzegovina	42
F3	Germany	86
E4	Denmark	47

5th place match
E3	Romania	54
F3	Germany	59
7th place match
F4	Bosnia and Herzegovina	65
E4	Denmark	61

==== 5th–8th place semifinals ====
8 August 2015

Boxscore

Romania	60–42	Bosnia and Herzegovina

Dinamo Polyvalent Hall

8 August 2015

Boxscore

Germany	86–47	Denmark

Dinamo Polyvalent Hall

==== 7th place match ====
9 August 2015

Boxscore

Bosnia and Herzegovina	65–61	Denmark

Dinamo Polyvalent Hall

==== 5th place match ====
9 August 2015

Boxscore

Romania	54–59	Germany

Dinamo Polyvalent Hall

=== Championship playoffs ===
Semifinals
E1	Sweden	30
F2	Slovakia	51
F1	Latvia	54
E2	Turkey	41

Final
F2	Slovakia	49
F1	Latvia	45
3rd place match
E1	Sweden	49
E2	Turkey	60

==== Semifinals ====
8 August 2015

Boxscore

Sweden	30–51	Slovakia

Dinamo Polyvalent Hall

8 August 2015

Boxscore

Latvia	54–41	Turkey

Dinamo Polyvalent Hall

==== 3rd place match ====
9 August 2015

Boxscore

Sweden	49–60	Turkey

Dinamo Polyvalent Hall

==== Final ====
9 August 2015

Boxscore

Slovakia	49–45	Latvia

Dinamo Polyvalent Hall

== Final standings ==
Rank	Team
1st place, gold medalist(s)	Slovakia
2nd place, silver medalist(s)	Latvia
3rd place, bronze medalist(s)	Turkey
4	Sweden
5	Germany
6	Romania
7	Bosnia and Herzegovina
8	Denmark
9	Finland
10	Greece
11	Belarus
12	England
13	Ukraine
14	Luxembourg
15	Bulgaria
16	Switzerland
17	Iceland
18	Ireland
19	Cyprus
20	Albania

Promoted to the 2016 FIBA U18 Women's European Championship Division A
