= 2024 FIBA U18 Women's EuroBasket Division C =

International basketball tournament

Tournament details
- Host country: Kosovo
- City: Pristina
- Dates: 23–28 July 2024
- Teams: 7 (from 1 confederation)
- Venue: 1 (in 1 host city)

Final positions
- Champions: Kosovo (1st title)
- Runners-up: Azerbaijan
- Third place: Albania
- Fourth place: Cyprus

Tournament statistics
- Games played: 15
- Attendance: 1,512 (101 per game)
- MVP: (Kosovo) Flutra Mehmeti
- Top scorer: (Azerbaijan) Angelina Ismayilova (19.8 points per game)

Official website
- www.fiba.basketball

The 2024 FIBA U18 Women's EuroBasket Division C was the 17th edition of the Division C of the FIBA U18 Women's EuroBasket, the third tier of the European women's under-18 basketball championship. The tournament was played in Pristina, Kosovo, from 23 to 28 July 2024.

== Participating teams ==
- Albania
- Armenia
- Azerbaijan
- Cyprus
- Georgia
- Kosovo
- Malta

== First round ==
The draw of the first round was held on 6 February 2024 in Freising, Germany.

In the first round, the teams were drawn into two groups. The first two teams from each group advanced to the semifinals; the other teams advanced to the 5th–7th place classification group.

All times are local (Central European Summer Time – UTC+2).

=== Group A ===
Pos	Team	Pld	W	L	PF	PA	PD	Pts	Qualification
1	Kosovo	2	2	0	115	91	+24	4	Semifinals
2	Cyprus	2	1	1	114	106	+8	3	Semifinals
3	Malta	2	0	2	82	114	−32	2	5th–7th place classification

Source: FIBA

23 July 2024
14:30

Boxscore

Malta	45–60	Cyprus
Scoring by quarter: 12–14, 13–13, 15–15, 5–18
Pts: Fenech 15; Rebs: Fenech 12; Asts: Said 3		Pts: Patsalidou 25; Rebs: Eftychiou 10; Asts: Michael 3

1 Tetori Sports Hall
Attendance: 70
Referees: Marina Shalamberidze (GEO), Tamara Harutyunyan (ARM), Ruslan Khaligov (AZE)

24 July 2024
19:30

Boxscore

Cyprus	54–61	Kosovo
Scoring by quarter: 14–19, 15–19, 12–13, 13–10
Pts: Eftychiou 12; Rebs: Savva 8 Asts: Savva, Siampoulli 3		Pts: Gashi 12; Rebs: Mehmeti 13; Asts: Rexhepi 4

1 Tetori Sports Hall
Attendance: 300
Referees: Igor Mitrovski (MKD), Tamara Harutyunyan (ARM), Ruslan Khaligov (AZE)

25 July 2024
19:30

Boxscore

Kosovo	54–37	Malta
Scoring by quarter: 7–13, 13–8, 12–8, 22–8
Pts: Gashi 11; Rebs: Hoti 7 Asts: Haziri, Gashi 2		Pts: Fenech 18; Rebs: Fenech 13; Asts: Farrugia 3

1 Tetori Sports Hall
Attendance: 100
Referees: Igor Mitrovski (MKD), Branimir Galić (CRO), Marina Shalamberidze (GEO)

=== Group B ===
Pos	Team	Pld	W	L	PF	PA	PD	Pts	Qualification
1	Azerbaijan	3	3	0	214	163	+51	6	Semifinals
2	Albania	3	2	1	191	171	+20	5	Semifinals
3	Georgia	3	1	2	194	216	−22	4	5th–7th place classification
4	Armenia	3	0	3	160	209	−49	3	5th–7th place classification

Source: FIBA

23 July 2024
17:00

Boxscore

Albania	53–72	Azerbaijan
Scoring by quarter: 17–15, 6–20, 14–16, 16–21
Pts: Angjelakidhu 14; Rebs: Luca 11; Asts: Tershalla 4		Pts: Ismayilova 21; Rebs: Allahverdiyeva 14; Asts: E. Gokcol 6

1 Tetori Sports Hall
Attendance: 50
Referees: Zdravko Rutesic (MNE), Ilias Kounelles (CYP), Amar Djekovic (KOS)

23 July 2024
19:30

Boxscore

Georgia	77–68	Armenia
Scoring by quarter: 15–27, 26–19, 16–16, 20–6
Pts: Sabadashvili 28; Rebs: Sabadashvili 19; Asts: Gelashvili 4		Pts: Krumian 24; Rebs: Vitebskaya 7 Asts: Krumian 6

1 Tetori Sports Hall
Attendance: 50
Referees: Igor Mitrovski (MKD), Branimir Galić (CRO), Gilbert Hoxha (ALB)

24 July 2024
14:30

Boxscore

Armenia	50–64	Albania
Scoring by quarter: 18–20, 6–14, 18–16, 8–14
Pts: Gabrielyan 21; Rebs: Krumian 12; Asts: Krumian 4		Pts: Haxhiu 20; Rebs: Haxhiu 26; Asts: Lazo 5

1 Tetori Sports Hall
Attendance: 50
Referees: Ilias Kounelles (CYP), Marina Shalamberidze (GEO), Amar Djekovic (KOS)

24 July 2024
17:00

Boxscore

Azerbaijan	74–68	Georgia
Scoring by quarter: 19–22, 18–24, 18–8, 19–14
Pts: Akbingol 19; Rebs: Akbingol 11; Asts: E. Gokcol 7		Pts: Sabadashvili 16; Rebs: Shonia 15; Asts: Svani 6

1 Tetori Sports Hall
Attendance: 100
Referees: Zdravko Rutesic (MNE), Branimir Galić (CRO), Gilbert Hoxha (ALB)

25 July 2024
14:30

Boxscore

Armenia	42–68	Azerbaijan
Scoring by quarter: 15–19, 11–17, 9–20, 7–12
Pts: Gabrielyan 16; Rebs: Gabrielyan 10; Asts: Gabrielyan 3		Pts: D. Gokcol 21; Rebs: Ramazanli 15; Asts: E. Gokcol 12

1 Tetori Sports Hall
Attendance: 20
Referees: Ilias Kounelles (CYP), Gilbert Hoxha (ALB), Amar Djekovic (KOS)

25 July 2024
17:00

Boxscore

Albania	74–49	Georgia
Scoring by quarter: 17–6, 16–12, 21–17, 20–14
Pts: Tershalla 18; Rebs: Haxhiu 14; Asts: Tershalla 8		Pts: Svani 11; Rebs: Shonia 14; Asts: Mukeria, Svani 3

1 Tetori Sports Hall
Attendance: 100
Referees: Zdravko Rutesic (MNE), Tamara Harutyunyan (ARM), Ruslan Khaligov (AZE)

== 5th–7th place classification ==
=== Group C ===
Pos	Team	Pld	W	L	PF	PA	PD	Pts
5	Georgia	2	2	0	138	124	+14	4
6	Malta	2	1	1	113	100	+13	3
7	Armenia	2	0	2	107	134	−27	2

Source: FIBA

27 July 2024
14:30

Boxscore

Armenia	39–57	Malta
Scoring by quarter: 13–17, 4–11, 10–15, 12–14
Pts: Krumian 17; Rebs: Gabrielyan 14; Asts: Three players 1		Pts: Fenech 18; Rebs: Fenech 14; Asts: Fenech 4

1 Tetori Sports Hall
Attendance: 20
Referees: Ilias Kounelles (CYP), Branimir Galić (CRO), Marina Shalamberidze (GEO)

28 July 2024
14:30

Boxscore

Malta	56–61	Georgia
Scoring by quarter: 12–17, 9–19, 17–13, 18–12
Pts: Fenech 17; Rebs: Fenech 9 Asts: Said 3		Pts: Svani 16; Rebs: Svani 10; Asts: Gelashvili, Mukeria 3

1 Tetori Sports Hall
Attendance: 20
Referees: Gilbert Hoxha (ALB), Tamara Harutyunyan (ARM), Ruslan Khaligov (AZE)

== Championship playoffs ==
Semifinals
A1	Kosovo	64
B2	Albania	48
B1	Azerbaijan	66
A2	Cyprus	49

Final
Kosovo	75
Azerbaijan	65
3rd place match
Albania	70
Cyprus	55

=== Semifinals ===
27 July 2024
17:00

Boxscore

Azerbaijan	66–49	Cyprus
Scoring by quarter: 28–15, 13–3, 14–13, 11–18
Pts: Ismayilova 26; Rebs: Akbingol 18; Asts: E. Gokcol 6		Pts: Eftychiou 13; Rebs: Eftychiou 7 Asts: Kouloumi 3

1 Tetori Sports Hall
Attendance: 20
Referees: Igor Mitrovski (MKD), Gilbert Hoxha (ALB), Amar Djekovic (KOS)

27 July 2024
19:30

Boxscore

Kosovo	64–48	Albania
Scoring by quarter: 18–7, 16–15, 11–16, 19–10
Pts: Mehmeti 20; Rebs: Mehmeti 10; Asts: Haziri, Bilalli 3		Pts: Disha 11; Rebs: Tershalla 12; Asts: Lazo 5

1 Tetori Sports Hall
Attendance: 250
Referees: Zdravko Rutesic (MNE), Tamara Harutyunyan (ARM), Ruslan Khaligov (AZE)

=== 3rd place match ===
28 July 2024
17:00

Boxscore

Albania	70–55	Cyprus
Scoring by quarter: 16–10, 11–12, 24–15, 19–18
Pts: Lazo 17; Rebs: Haxhiu 16; Asts: Lazo 5		Pts: Eleftheriou 14; Rebs: Siampoulli 8 Asts: Savva, Eftychiou 3

1 Tetori Sports Hall
Attendance: 12
Referees: Zdravko Rutesic (MNE), Marina Shalamberidze (GEO), Amar Djekovic (KOS)

=== Final ===
28 July 2024
19:30

Boxscore

Kosovo	75–65	Azerbaijan
Scoring by quarter: 27–24, 13–9, 24–17, 11–15
Pts: Haziri 24; Rebs: Hoti, Rexhepi 8 Asts: Haziri 5		Pts: Akbingol 19; Rebs: Akbingol 12; Asts: E. Gokcol 8

1 Tetori Sports Hall
Attendance: 350
Referees: Igor Mitrovski (MKD), Ilias Kounelles (CYP), Branimir Galić (CRO)

== Final standings ==
Rank	Team	Record
1st place, gold medalist(s)	Kosovo	4–0
2nd place, silver medalist(s)	Azerbaijan	4–1
3rd place, bronze medalist(s)	Albania	3–2
4	Cyprus	1–3
5	Georgia	2–2
6	Malta	1–3
7	Armenia	0–4

Promoted to the 2025 FIBA U18 Women's EuroBasket Division B
