= 2023 FIBA U18 Women's European Championship Division C =

Tournament details
- Host country: Albania
- City: Durrës
- Dates: 1–6 August 2023
- Teams: 7 (from 1 confederation)
- Venue(s): 1 (in 1 host city)

Final positions
- Champions: Malta (2nd title)
- Runners-up: Albania
- Third place: Armenia

Official website
- www.fiba.basketball

The 2023 FIBA U18 Women's European Championship Division C was the 16th edition of the Division C of the FIBA U18 Women's European Championship, the third tier of the European women's under-18 basketball championship. It was played from 1 to 6 August 2023 in Durrës, Albania. Malta women's national under-18 basketball team won the tournament.

The event was a premiere for Albania as it was both the first time, Albania hosted the event and it was also the first time Albania reached the final.

== Participating teams ==
- Albania
- Andorra
- Armenia
- Cyprus
- Kosovo
- Malta
- Moldova

== First round ==
The draw of the first round was held on 14 February 2023 in Freising, Germany.

In the first round, the teams were drawn into two groups. The first two teams from each group advance to the semifinals; the other teams will play in the 5th–7th place classification group.

=== Group A ===
Pos	Team	Pld	W	L	PF	PA	PD	Pts	Qualification
1	Malta	2	2	0	144	121	+23	4	Semifinals
2	Andorra	2	1	1	125	136	−11	3	Semifinals
3	Cyprus	2	0	2	102	114	−12	2	5th−7th place classification

Source: FIBA

1 August 2023

Boxscore

Cyprus	50–56	Andorra

Dhimitraq Goga Sports Palace

2 August 2023

Boxscore

Andorra	69–86	Malta

Dhimitraq Goga Sports Palace

3 August 2023

Boxscore

Malta	58–52	Cyprus

Dhimitraq Goga Sports Palace

=== Group B ===
Pos	Team	Pld	W	L	PF	PA	PD	Pts	Qualification
1	Albania	3	3	0	207	142	+65	6	Semifinals
2	Armenia	3	2	1	201	155	+46	5	Semifinals
3	Kosovo	3	1	2	178	197	−19	4	5th−7th place classification
4	Moldova	3	0	3	150	242	−92	3	5th−7th place classification

Source: FIBA

1 August 2023

Boxscore

Moldova	45–75	Armenia

Dhimitraq Goga Sports Palace

1 August 2023

Boxscore

Kosovo	45–63	Albania

Dhimitraq Goga Sports Palace

2 August 2023

Boxscore

Albania	82–44	Moldova

Dhimitraq Goga Sports Palace

2 August 2023

Boxscore

Armenia	73–48	Kosovo

Dhimitraq Goga Sports Palace

3 August 2023

Boxscore

Moldova	61–85	Kosovo

Dhimitraq Goga Sports Palace

3 August 2023

Boxscore

Albania	62–53	Armenia

Dhimitraq Goga Sports Palace

== 5th−7th place classification ==
=== Group C ===
Pos	Team	Pld	W	L	PF	PA	PD	Pts
5	Cyprus	2	2	0	166	104	+62	4
6	Kosovo	2	1	1	139	146	−7	3
7	Moldova	2	0	2	111	166	−55	2

Source: FIBA

5 August 2023

Boxscore

Moldova	50–81	Cyprus

Dhimitraq Goga Sports Palace

6 August 2023

Boxscore

Cyprus	85–54	Kosovo

Dhimitraq Goga Sports Palace

== Playoffs ==
Semifinals
A1	Malta	68
B2	Armenia	60
B1	Albania	67
A2	Andorra	53

Final
A1	Malta	56
B1	Albania	47
3rd place match
B2	Armenia	81
A2	Andorra	66

=== Semifinals ===
5 August 2023

Boxscore

Malta	68–60	Armenia

Dhimitraq Goga Sports Palace

5 August 2023

Boxscore

Albania	67–53	Andorra

Dhimitraq Goga Sports Palace

=== 3rd place match ===
6 August 2023

Boxscore

Armenia	81–66	Andorra

Dhimitraq Goga Sports Palace

=== Final ===
6 August 2023

Boxscore

Malta	56–47	Albania

Dhimitraq Goga Sports Palace

== Final standings ==
Rank	Team
1st place, gold medalist(s)	Malta
2nd place, silver medalist(s)	Albania
3rd place, bronze medalist(s)	Armenia
4	Andorra
5	Cyprus
6	Kosovo
7	Moldova
