= FIBA U18 Women's EuroBasket =

Basketball competition

- Most recent season or competition: 2026 FIBA U18 Women's EuroBasket
- Sport: Basketball
- Founded: 1965; 61 years ago
- Divisions: 3
- No. of teams: 16 (Division A)
- Continent: Europe (FIBA Europe)
- Most recent champion: Spain (7th title)
- Most titles: Soviet Union (11 titles)
- Qualification: FIBA Under-19 Women's Basketball World Cup
- Related competitions: FIBA U20 Women's EuroBasket; FIBA U16 Women's EuroBasket
- Website: www.fiba.basketball

The FIBA U18 Women's EuroBasket, formerly the FIBA U18 Women's European Championship, and originally the FIBA European Championship for Junior Women, is an annual youth basketball competition contested by under-18 women's national teams from FIBA Europe.

The inaugural tournament was in 1965, and was held biennially until 2004. Since 2005, the competition has been played every year. In even-numbered years, the tournament also serves as the European qualification path for the FIBA Under-19 Women's Basketball World Cup.

The current champions are Spain, having beaten France in the 2026 final.

== Division A ==
=== Results ===
Year	Host	Gold medal game			Bronze medal game		
Year	Host	Gold	Score	Silver	Bronze	Score	Fourth place
1965	Bulgaria (Kyustendil, Lom, Botevgrad, Sofia)	Soviet Union	Round-robin group	Yugoslavia	Czechoslovakia	Round-robin group	Poland
1967	Italy (Nuoro, Sassari & Cagliari)	Soviet Union	Round-robin group	Czechoslovakia	Yugoslavia	Round-robin group	Bulgaria
1969	West Germany (Köln, Lünen, Essen, Hohenlimburg, Hagen)	Soviet Union	Round-robin group	Bulgaria	Yugoslavia	Round-robin group	Poland
1971	Yugoslavia (Bačka Topola & Subotica)	Soviet Union	76–52	Czechoslovakia	Bulgaria	62–52	Italy
1973	Italy (San Remo & Loano)	Soviet Union	68–47	Yugoslavia	Italy	50–48	Bulgaria
1975	Spain (Vigo)	Czechoslovakia	53–48	Poland	Soviet Union	80–57	Bulgaria
1977	Bulgaria (Haskovo & Dimitrovgrad)	Soviet Union	96–53	Poland	Czechoslovakia	61–50	Yugoslavia
1979	Italy (Capo d'Orlando, P. Armerina, Catania, Palermo, Messina)	Soviet Union	Round-robin group	Hungary	Czechoslovakia	Round-robin group	Yugoslavia
1981	Hungary (Eger & Kecskemét)	Soviet Union	74–61	France	Bulgaria	90–59	Hungary
1983	Italy (Pescara, & Vasto)	Czechoslovakia	90–80	Soviet Union	Italy	66–46	Yugoslavia
1984	Spain (Toledo)	Yugoslavia	67–61	Soviet Union	Czechoslovakia	68–61	Spain
1986	Italy (Perugia, Gualdo Tadino)	Soviet Union	71–70	Yugoslavia	Italy	62–56	Poland
1988	Bulgaria (Veliko Tarnovo)	Soviet Union	73–56	Czechoslovakia	Yugoslavia	82–58	Bulgaria
1990	Spain (Alcalá de Henares)	Soviet Union	79–76	Spain	Romania	67–65	Czechoslovakia
1992	Greece (Kalamata, Tripoli & Patras)	CIS	86–60	Bulgaria	Poland	67–62	France
1994	Bulgaria (Veliko Tarnovo)	Italy	74–68	Spain	Hungary	63–56	Russia
1996	Slovakia (Žilina)	Russia	69–59	Slovakia	Czech Republic	66–50	Spain
1998	Turkey (Eskişehir, Kütahya & Bursa)	Spain	78–52	Slovakia	Russia	79–72	Czech Republic
2000	Poland (Cetniewo)	Russia	64–51	Czech Republic	Poland	75–44	Lithuania
2002	Slovenia (Škofja Loka)	Russia	60–56	France	Czech Republic	83–56	Slovakia
2004	Slovakia (Bratislava)	Russia	77–59	Spain	Hungary	73–63	Serbia and Montenegro
2005	Hungary (Budapest)	Serbia and Montenegro	66–52	Spain	France	77–66	Czech Republic
2006	Spain (Tenerife)	Spain	78–74	Serbia and Montenegro	Sweden	62–57	Czech Republic
2007	Serbia (Novi Sad)	Serbia	72–48	Spain	Russia	71–65	Poland
2008	Slovakia (Nitra)	Lithuania	63–57	Russia	Czech Republic	70–61	France
2009	Sweden (Södertälje)	Spain	64–54	France	Sweden	67–54	Czech Republic
2010	Slovakia (Poprad)	Italy	66–61	Spain	France	63–44	Slovenia
2011	Romania (Oradea)	Belgium	77–49	France	Spain	85–69	Sweden
2012	Romania (Bucharest)	France	65–61	Russia	Serbia	59–46	Netherlands
2013	Croatia (Vukovar, Vinkovci)	Spain	60–46	France	Serbia	57–56	Netherlands
2014	Portugal (Matosinhos)	Russia	57–53	France	Spain	74–69	Serbia
2015	Slovenia (Celje)	Spain	76–60	France	Russia	71–52	Italy
2016	Hungary (Sopron)	France	74–44	Spain	Russia	65–58	Latvia
2017	Hungary (Sopron)	Belgium	55–53	Serbia	France	55–48	Czech Republic
2018	Italy (Udine)	Germany	67–54	Spain	Hungary	58–56	Latvia
2019	Bosnia and Herzegovina (Sarajevo)	Italy	70–62	Hungary	France	77–45	Russia
2020	Greece	Cancelled due to COVID-19 pandemic in Greece					
2021	Greece	Cancelled due to COVID-19 pandemic in Europe. The 2021 FIBA U18 Women's European Challengers were played instead.					
2022	Greece (Heraklion)	Lithuania	78–75	Spain	France	75–46	Germany
2023	Turkey (Konya)	Slovenia	63–61	France	Spain	80–52	Serbia
2024	Portugal (Matosinhos)	France	80–70	Spain	Serbia	72–56	Israel
2025	Spain (La Palma)	Spain	81–72	Finland	France	72–47	Belgium
2026	Sweden (Stockholm)	Spain	82–46	France	Finland	75–52	Serbia
2027	TBD; TBD		–			–	
2028	TBD; TBD		–			–	

=== Medal table ===
As of 2026
Rank	Nation	Gold	Silver	Bronze	Total
1	Russia (Note: Soviet Union and CIS won 12 gold, 2 silver and 1 bronze medals.)	17	4	5	26
2	Spain	7	10	3	20
3	France	3	9	6	18
4	Serbia (Note: Yugoslavia and Serbia and Montenegro won 2 gold, 4 silver and 3 bronze medals.)	3	5	6	14
5	Italy	3	0	3	6
6	Czech Republic (Note: Czechoslovakia won 2 gold, 3 silver and 4 bronze medals.)	2	4	7	13
7	Belgium	2	0	0	2
7	Lithuania	2	0	0	2
9	Germany	1	0	0	1
9	Slovenia	1	0	0	1
11	Hungary	0	2	3	5
12	Bulgaria	0	2	2	4
12	Poland	0	2	2	4
14	Slovakia	0	2	0	2
15	Finland	0	1	1	2
16	Sweden	0	0	2	2
17	Romania	0	0	1	1
Totals (17 entries)		41	41	41	123

=== Participation details ===
==== Tournaments 1965–1992 ====
Team	(Bulgaria) 1965	(Italy) 1967	(West Germany) 1969	(Socialist Federal Republic of Yugoslavia) 1971	(Italy) 1973	(Spain) 1975	(Bulgaria) 1977	(Italy) 1979	(Hungary) 1981	(Italy) 1983	(Spain) 1984	(Italy) 1986	(Bulgaria) 1988	(Spain) 1990	(Greece) 1992
Austria						12th									
Belgium		12th		9th	12th			12th		12th			7th		
Bulgaria	5th	4th	2nd	3rd	4th	4th	9th	8th	3rd	5th	6th		4th	8th	2nd
CIS †	played as (Soviet Union)														1st
Czechoslovakia †	3rd	2nd	7th	2nd		1st	3rd	3rd	5th	1st	3rd	11th	2nd	4th	6th
East Germany †	9th													†	
Finland							8th	7th	8th						
France	8th	9th			11th	10th	10th	10th	2nd	7th	11th	6th	9th	7th	4th
West Germany	11th	11th	11th		10th	11th				10th	10th	8th	12th	10th	
Greece														12th	10th
Hungary	6th	6th	5th	7th	6th	5th	5th	2nd	4th	6th	8th	9th	11th	9th	7th
Israel		10th	8th	8th	9th	9th	12th						10th		
Italy	10th	7th	6h	4th	3rd	8th	7th	5th	7th	3rd	5th	3rd	5th	6th	9th
Netherlands			10th	10th	7th			11th	12th		9th	7th			
Poland	4th	5th	4th	6th	5th	2nd	2nd	9th	11th	11th	12th	4th	8th	11th	3rd
Romania	7th	8th	9th				6th	6th				5th		3rd	8th
Scotland				11th											
Soviet Union †	1st	1st	1st	1st	1st	3rd	1st	1st	1st	2nd	2nd	1st	1st	1st	†
Spain					8th	6th	11th		9th	8th	4th	12th	6th	2nd	5th
Sweden									10th	9th	7th	10th		5th	11th
Switzerland				12th											
Yugoslavia †	2nd	3rd	3rd	5th	2nd	7th	4th	4th	6th	4th	1st	2nd	3rd	†	
Team	(Bulgaria) 1965	(Italy) 1967	(West Germany) 1969	(Socialist Federal Republic of Yugoslavia) 1971	(Italy) 1973	(Spain) 1975	(Bulgaria) 1977	(Italy) 1979	(Hungary) 1981	(Italy) 1983	(Spain) 1984	(Italy) 1986	(Bulgaria) 1988	(Spain) 1990	(Greece) 1992

==== Tournaments 1994–2013 ====
Team	(Bulgaria) 1994	(Slovakia) 1996	(Turkey) 1998	(Poland) 2000	(Slovenia) 2002	(Slovakia) 2004	(Hungary) 2005	(Spain) 2006	(Serbia) 2007	(Slovakia) 2008	(Sweden) 2009	(Slovakia) 2010	(Romania) 2011	(Romania) 2012	(Croatia) 2013
Belarus						10th		9th	14th	13th	15th				15th
Belgium	11th						11th	15th			11th	13th	1st	15th	
Bosnia and Herzegovina															
Bulgaria	8th		11th	11th		8th	12th	8th	13th	12th	16th				
Croatia			8th		8th		15th			16th				7th	13th
Czech Republic	10th	3rd	4th	2nd	3rd		4th	4th	6th	3rd	4th	14th	9th	13th	11th
England															16th
Finland					11th										
France	5th	7th	10th	5th	2nd	5th	3rd	6th	7th	4th	2nd	3rd	2nd	1st	2nd
Germany		8th		7th		12th	9th	12th	15th						
Greece	9th	5th		8th	7th		14th	16th						11th	10th
Hungary	3rd	6th				3rd	6th	7th	16th			15th			
Israel						9th									
Italy	1st	11th	7th		9th		16th		8th	14th	10th	1st	10th	8th	6th
Latvia			12th	10th							7th	16th			
Lithuania		10th		4th			7th	5th	10th	1st	6th	6th	16th		
Netherlands													5th	4th	4th
Poland	12th		6th	3rd	6th		13th	14th	4th	8th	12th	11th	6th	14th	
Portugal															9th
Romania	7th				12th					15th			12th	16th	
Russia	4th	1st	3rd	1st	1st	1st	5th	11th	3rd	2nd	9th	5th	13th	2nd	5th
Serbia			played as (Serbia and Montenegro)						1st	6th	5th	12th	8th	3rd	3rd
Serbia and Montenegro †^{A}		9th	5th	9th		4th	1st	2nd	defunct						
Slovakia	6th	2nd	2nd	12th	4th	11th	8th	13th	9th	7th	14th	9th	14th	9th	14th
Slovenia					10th							4th	11th	12th	12th
Spain	2nd	4th	1st	6th	5th	2nd	2nd	1st	2nd	5th	1st	2nd	3rd	5th	1st
Sweden								3rd	12th	10th	3rd	8th	4th	10th	8th
Turkey			9th			6th	10th	10th	11th	9th	13th	10th	7th	6th	7th
Ukraine		12th				7th			5th	11th	8th	7th	15th		
Team	(Bulgaria) 1994	(Slovakia) 1996	(Turkey) 1998	(Poland) 2000	(Slovenia) 2002	(Slovakia) 2004	(Hungary) 2005	(Spain) 2006	(Serbia) 2007	(Slovakia) 2008	(Sweden) 2009	(Slovakia) 2010	(Romania) 2011	(Romania) 2012	(Croatia) 2013
Austria	playing in lower divisions														
Switzerland	playing in lower divisions														
CIS †	defunct														
Czechoslovakia †	defunct, succeeded by Czech Republic and Slovakia														
East Germany †	defunct, succeeded by Germany														
Soviet Union †	defunct														
Yugoslavia †	defunct														

==== Tournaments 2014–present ====
Team	(Portugal) 2014	(Slovenia) 2015	(Hungary) 2016	(Hungary) 2017	(Italy) 2018	(Bosnia and Herzegovina) 2019	(Greece) 2022	(Turkey) 2023	(Portugal) 2024	(Spain) 2025	(Sweden) 2026	Total
Belarus						9th						7
Belgium	5th	7th	6th	1st	5th	12th	12th	9th	7th	4th	5th	24
Bosnia and Herzegovina				12th	13th	14th	16th					4
Bulgaria												23
Croatia	8th	9th	12th	9th	9th	15th			14th		12th	14
Czech Republic	11th	6th	13th	4th	6th	8th	6th	14th		11th	10th	24
Estonia		16th										1
Finland							7th	10th	8th	2nd	3rd	9
France	2nd	2nd	1st	3rd	7th	3rd	3rd	2nd	1st	3rd	2nd	39
Germany					1st	6th	4th	11th	15th		9th	22
Greece	14th			16th			14th			14th		14
Hungary		13th	5th	5th	3rd	2nd	11th	5th	6th	9th	15th	32
Ireland					14th							1
Israel		12th	14th			11th	13th	12th	4th	16th		15
Italy	7th	4th	7th	10th	10th	1st	5th	13th	9th	6th	7th	38
Latvia			4th	13th	4th	7th	9th	8th	10th	10th	8th	13
Lithuania	13th	10th	9th	14th		13th	1st	16th				16
Luxembourg									16th			1
Montenegro										8th	16th	2
Netherlands	6th	8th	16th									13
Poland	12th	14th			11th	10th	8th	7th	11th	5th	6th	36
Portugal	9th	15th						15th	5th	15th		6
Romania												13
Russia	1st	3rd	3rd	11th	8th	4th						21
Serbia	4th	11th	11th	2nd	12th	16th		4th	3rd	7th	4th	17
Slovakia			15th									16
Slovenia	10th	5th	10th	7th	16th			1st	13th	12th	11th	14
Spain	3rd	1st	2nd	6th	2nd	5th	2nd	3rd	2nd	1st	1st	36
Sweden	16th			8th	15th		15th				14th	19
Turkey	15th		8th	15th			10th	6th	12th	13th	13th	19
Ukraine												8
Team	(Portugal) 2014	(Slovenia) 2015	(Hungary) 2016	(Hungary) 2017	(Italy) 2018	(Bosnia and Herzegovina) 2019	(Greece) 2022	(Turkey) 2023	(Portugal) 2024	(Spain) 2025	(Sweden) 2026	Total
Austria	playing in lower divisions											1
Bulgaria	playing in lower divisions											23
Romania	playing in lower divisions											13
Switzerland	playing in lower divisions											1
Ukraine	playing in lower divisions											8
England	playing in LD			Great Britain								1
Scotland	playing in LD			Great Britain								1
CIS †	defunct											1
Czechoslovakia †	defunct, succeeded by Czech Republic and Slovakia											14
East Germany †	defunct, succeeded by Germany											1
Serbia and Montenegro †^{A}	defunct											6
Soviet Union †	defunct											14
Yugoslavia †	defunct											13

^{^A} As FR Yugoslavia (1992–2003, 3 participations) and as Serbia and Montenegro (2003–2006, 3 participations, 2 medals)

== Division B ==
=== Results ===
Year	Host	Promoted to Division A			Bronze medal game		
Year	Host	Gold	Score	Silver	Bronze *	Score	Fourth place
2005	Bosnia and Herzegovina (Bihać)	Belarus	65–46	Sweden	Latvia	53–44	Estonia
2006	Italy (Chieti)	Italy	63–59	Ukraine	Croatia	66–51	Latvia
2007	Romania (Timișoara)	Croatia	70–59	Romania	Estonia	66–49	Latvia
2008	Macedonia (Skopje)	Latvia	96–64	Belgium	Slovenia	80–66	Greece
2009	Israel (Eilat)	Hungary	60–47	Slovenia	Germany	79–62	Israel
2010	Romania (Timișoara)	Romania	63–61	Netherlands	Greece	52–48	Belarus
2011	Hungary (Miskolc)	Croatia	61–49	Greece	Latvia	71–64	Finland
2012	Macedonia (Strumica)	Belarus	76–74	England	Portugal	68–57	Hungary
2013	Hungary (Miskolc)	Poland	60–55	Belgium	Lithuania	59–56	Latvia
2014	Romania (Timișoara)	Hungary	58–52	Estonia	Israel	71–64	Latvia
2015	Romania (Bucharest)	Slovakia	49–45	Latvia	Turkey	60–49	Sweden
2016	Bosnia and Herzegovina (Sarajevo)	Sweden	62–47	Greece	Bosnia and Herzegovina	82–67	Iceland
2017	Ireland (Dublin)	Germany	67–43	Ireland	Poland	64–50	Great Britain
2018	Austria (Oberwart, Güssing, Fürstenfeld)	Lithuania	86–71	Belarus	Israel	63–51	Turkey
2019	North Macedonia (Skopje)	Finland	63–56	Greece	Turkey	65–57	Sweden
2020	Austria	Cancelled due to COVID-19 pandemic in Austria					
2021	Austria	Cancelled due to COVID-19 pandemic in Europe. The 2021 FIBA U18 Women's European Challengers were played instead.					
2022	Austria (Oberwart, Güssing)	Slovenia	59–44	Portugal	Serbia	62–50	Slovakia
2023	Bulgaria (Sofia)	Croatia	93–66	Luxembourg	Greece	68–44	Bosnia and Herzegovina
2024	Romania (Ploiesti)	Montenegro	63–58	Czech Republic	Greece	70–51	Bulgaria
2025	Lithuania (Vilnius, Alytus)	Sweden	77–69	Germany	Croatia	88–83	Lithuania
2026	Romania (Tulcea)	Israel	85–66	Romania	Lithuania	71–64	Austria

* Since 2012, the 3rd team in Division B is also promoted to Division A for the next tournament.

=== Medal table ===
Rank	Nation	Gold	Silver	Bronze	Total
1	Croatia	3	0	2	5
2	Belarus	2	1	0	3
2	Sweden	2	1	0	3
4	Hungary	2	0	0	2
5	Romania	1	2	0	3
6	Latvia	1	1	2	4
7	Germany	1	1	1	3
7	Slovenia	1	1	1	3
9	Israel	1	0	2	3
9	Lithuania	1	0	2	3
11	Poland	1	0	1	2
12	Finland	1	0	0	1
12	Italy	1	0	0	1
12	Montenegro	1	0	0	1
12	Slovakia	1	0	0	1
16	Greece	0	3	3	6
17	Belgium	0	2	0	2
18	Estonia	0	1	1	2
18	Portugal	0	1	1	2
20	Czech Republic	0	1	0	1
20	England	0	1	0	1
20	Ireland	0	1	0	1
20	Luxembourg	0	1	0	1
20	Netherlands	0	1	0	1
20	Ukraine	0	1	0	1
26	Turkey	0	0	2	2
27	Bosnia and Herzegovina	0	0	1	1
27	Serbia	0	0	1	1
Totals (28 entries)		20	20	20	60

=== Participation details ===
Team	(Bosnia and Herzegovina) 2005	(Italy) 2006	(Romania) 2007	(North Macedonia) 2008	(Israel) 2009	(Romania) 2010	(Hungary) 2011	(North Macedonia) 2012	(Hungary) 2013	(Romania) 2014	(Romania) 2015	(Bosnia and Herzegovina) 2016	(Republic of Ireland) 2017	(Austria) 2018	(North Macedonia) 2019	(Austria) 2022	(Bulgaria) 2023	(Romania) 2024	(Lithuania) 2025	(Romania) 2026	Total
Albania											20th	19th	22nd	21st	23rd						5
Austria			17th	14th			15th	10th	12th				16th	17th	17th	14th	15th	16th	19th	4th	13
Azerbaijan																			12th	17th	2
Belgium			10th	2nd					2nd												3
Bosnia and Herzegovina	11th	5th	13th	9th	6th	16th			5th	11th	7th	3rd					4th	8th	17th		13
Belarus	1st					4th	6th	1st			12th	5th	6th	2nd							8
Bulgaria						15th	12th	5th	7th	7th	15th	15th	9th	20th	18th	8th	8th	4th	10th	8th	15
Croatia		3rd	1st		11th	5th	1st									5th	1st		3rd		8
Cyprus											19th			16th							2
Czech Republic																		2nd			1
Denmark			18th	17th	9th	6th	10th	6th	15th	16th	8th	14th	24th	13th	5th	16th	14th	14th	15th	10th	18
England	5th	13th	11th	13th	12th	8th	14th	2nd		8th	11th	11th	Great Britain								11
Estonia	4th	6th	3rd	5th		13th			10th	2nd		12th	17th		16th	13th	11th		8th	20th	14
Finland	8th	12th	15th	16th	8th	7th	4th	11th	11th	5th	9th	10th	10th	7th	1st						15
Georgia													20th	24th							2
Germany				8th	3rd	9th	9th	8th	9th	10th	5th	7th	1st						2nd		11
Great Britain													4th	10th	19th	11th	12th	6th	6th	7th	8
Greece			8th	4th	7th	3rd	2nd				10th	2nd		11th	2nd		3rd	3rd		6th	12
Hungary				7th	1st		5th	4th	8th	1st											6
Iceland	7th	11th		12th						15th	17th	4th	13th	19th	15th	12th	7th	12th	5th	5th	14
Ireland	10th	10th	6th	11th						13th	18th	8th	2nd		9th	9th	6th	9th	14th	13th	14
Israel	9th	8th	7th		4th	12th	8th	13th	14th	3rd			7th	3rd						1st	12
Italy		1st																			1
Kosovo														22nd	22nd				21st		3
Latvia	3rd	4th	4th	1st			3rd	9th	4th	4th	2nd										9
Lithuania								7th	3rd					1st				5th	4th	3rd	6
Luxembourg	12th		19th	15th		17th	13th			14th	14th		18th	12th	14th	10th	2nd		11th	15th	14
Moldova													23rd								1
Montenegro			12th			10th		14th		6th				18th				1st			6
Netherlands	14th		9th	6th	13th	2nd						18th	11th	6th	7th	6th	9th	11th	7th	11th	14
North Macedonia		14th		19th				15th					21st		21st	18th	16th	18th	18th	18th	10
Norway					15th		11th	16th	18th				15th	23rd	20th	17th	18th	15th	20th	19th	12
Poland									1st			6th	3rd								2
Portugal	6th	9th	14th	10th	5th	11th	7th	3rd				9th	5th	5th	6th	2nd				9th	14
Romania	15th	7th	2nd		10th	1st			13th	12th	6th	17th	8th	9th	8th	7th	17th	13th	13th	2nd	17
Scotland			16th	18th		18th		18th	17th			16th	Great Britain								6
Serbia																3rd					1
Slovakia											1st		12th	14th	10th	4th	5th	7th	9th	12th	9
Slovenia			5th	3rd	2nd										11th	1st					5
Sweden	2nd										4th	1st			4th		13th	17th	1st		7
Switzerland				20th	14th	14th	16th	17th	16th	17th	16th		19th	15th	12th					16th	12
Turkey											3rd			4th	3rd						3
Ukraine	8th	2nd						12th	6th	9th	13th	13th	14th	8th	13th	15th	10th	10th	16th	14th	15
Team	(Bosnia and Herzegovina) 2005	(Italy) 2006	(Romania) 2007	(North Macedonia) 2008	(Israel) 2009	(Romania) 2010	(Hungary) 2011	(North Macedonia) 2012	(Hungary) 2013	(Romania) 2014	(Romania) 2015	(Bosnia and Herzegovina) 2016	(Republic of Ireland) 2017	(Austria) 2018	(North Macedonia) 2019	(Austria) 2022	(Bulgaria) 2023	(Romania) 2024	(Lithuania) 2025	(Romania) 2026	Total

== Division C ==
=== Results ===
Year	Host	Gold medal game			Bronze medal game		
Year	Host	Gold	Score	Silver	Bronze	Score	Fourth place
1997	Malta	Ireland	69–58	England	Armenia	89–78	Scotland
1999	Cyprus	Scotland	67–49	Andorra	Armenia	67–62	Cyprus
2001	Cyprus	Cyprus	67–57	Luxembourg	Scotland	54–45	Iceland
2003	Iceland	Iceland	Round-robin group	Scotland	Andorra	Round-robin group	Malta
2005	Scotland	Scotland	59–57	Luxembourg	Albania	72–62	Malta
2007	Malta	Malta	Round-robin group	Andorra	Monaco	Round-robin group	Luxembourg
2009	Malta	Luxembourg	Round-robin group	Monaco	Malta	Round-robin group	Moldova
2013	Andorra	Andorra	51–41	Malta	Wales	66–39	Gibraltar
2014	Andorra	Cyprus	67–53	Malta	Andorra	56–47	Gibraltar
2015	Gibraltar	Scotland	Round-robin group	Malta	Wales	Round-robin group	Andorra
2016	Georgia	Armenia	66–32	Georgia	Malta	71–63	Andorra
2017	Malta	Cyprus	Round-robin group	Armenia	Malta	Round-robin group	Gibraltar
2018	Andorra	Gibraltar	56-49	Malta	Andorra	55-41	Moldova
2019	Andorra	Armenia	79-73	Malta	Georgia	72-45	Andorra
2020	Andorra	Cancelled due to COVID-19 pandemic in Andorra					
2021	Andorra	Cancelled due to COVID-19 pandemic in Europe. The 2021 FIBA U18 Women's European Challengers were played instead.					
2022	Andorra	Georgia	61-37	Malta	Albania	79-73	Andorra
2023	Albania	Malta	56–47	Albania	Armenia	81–66	Andorra
2024	Kosovo	Kosovo	75–65	Azerbaijan	Albania	70–55	Cyprus
2025	Andorra	Georgia	63–60	Armenia	Malta	80–56	Albania
2026	Kosovo	Malta	56–35	Cyprus	Kosovo	74–58	Georgia

=== Medal table ===
Rank	Nation	Gold	Silver	Bronze	Total
1	Malta	3	6	4	13
2	Scotland	3	1	1	5
3	Cyprus	3	1	0	4
4	Armenia	2	2	3	7
5	Georgia	2	1	1	4
6	Andorra	1	2	3	6
7	Luxembourg	1	2	0	3
8	Kosovo	1	0	1	2
9	Gibraltar	1	0	0	1
9	Iceland	1	0	0	1
9	Ireland	1	0	0	1
12	Albania	0	1	3	4
13	Monaco	0	1	1	2
14	Azerbaijan	0	1	0	1
14	England	0	1	0	1
16	Wales	0	0	2	2
Totals (16 entries)		19	19	19	57

== Under-19 Women's World Cup record ==
Team	(United States) 1985	(Spain) 1989	(South Korea) 1993	(Brazil) 1997	(Czech Republic) 2001	(Tunisia) 2005	(Slovakia) 2007	(Thailand) 2009	(Chile) 2011	(Lithuania) 2013	(Russia) 2015	(Italy) 2017	(Thailand) 2019	(Hungary) 2021	(Spain) 2023	(Czech Republic) 2025	(China) 2027	Total
Belgium	–	–	–	–	–	–	–	–	–	–	6th	–	4th	–	–	–	Q	3
Bulgaria	–	11th	9th	–	–	–	–	–	–	–	–	–	–	–	–	–	–	2
Czech Republic	as Czechoslovakia			6th	1st	–	7th	10th	–	–	–	–	–	6th	7th	13th	–	7
Finland	–	–	–	–	–	–	–	–	-	–	–	-	–	-	-	–	Q	1
France	–	–	6th	–	5th	–	–	7th	6th	2nd	5th	5th	–	10th	4th	5th	Q	11
Germany	–	–	–	–	–	–	–	–	–	–	–	–	13th	–	10th	–	–	2
Hungary	–	–	–	–	–	8th	–	–	–	–	–	9th	10th	3rd	–	8th	–	5
Israel	–	–	–	–	–	–	–	–	-	–	–	-	–	-	-	10th	–	1
Italy	–	–	–	–	–	–	–	–	10th	–	–	11th	–	11th	11th	–	–	4
Latvia	as USSR		–	–	–	–	–	–	–	–	–	10th	14th	–	–	–	–	2
Lithuania	as USSR		–	–	8th	–	12th	8th	–	12th	–	–	–	–	8th	–	–	5
Netherlands	–	–	–	–	–	–	–	–	–	10th	9th	–	–	–	–	–	–	2
Poland	–	–	3rd	–	10th	–	–	–	–	–	–	–	–	–	–	–	–	2
Portugal	–	–	–	–	–	–	–	–	-	–	–	-	–	-	-	7th	–	1
Russia	as USSR		2nd	5th	2nd	4th	–	6th	8th	9th	2nd	1st	–	8th	–	–	–	10
Serbia	as Yugoslavia			as SCG			3rd	–	–	11th	11th	–	–	–	–	–	Q	4
Slovakia	as Czechoslovakia			3rd	–	–	6th	–	–	–	–	–	–	–	–	–	–	2
Slovenia	as Yugoslavia			–	–	–		–	14th	–	–	–	–	–	–	–	–	1
Spain	7th	5th	–	8th	–	5th	4th	2nd	2nd	4th	4th	8th	3rd	7th	2nd	3rd	Q	14
Sweden	–	–	–	–	–	–	2nd	–	–	–	–	–	–	–	–	–	–	1
Team	(United States) 1985	(Spain) 1989	(South Korea) 1993	(Brazil) 1997	(Czech Republic) 2001	(Tunisia) 2005	(Slovakia) 2007	(Thailand) 2009	(Chile) 2011	(Lithuania) 2013	(Russia) 2015	(Italy) 2017	(Thailand) 2019	(Hungary) 2021	(Spain) 2023	(Czech Republic) 2025	(China) 2027	Total
Czechoslovakia †	–	4th	defunct															1
Serbia and Montenegro †	as Yugoslavia			–	–	2nd	defunct											1
Soviet Union †	1st	1st	defunct															2
Yugoslavia †	3rd	2nd	defunct															2
Total	3	5	4	4	5	4	5	5	5	6	6	6	5	6	6	6	5	

== See also ==
- EuroBasket Women
- FIBA U20 Women's EuroBasket
- FIBA U16 Women's EuroBasket
