= 2019 FIBA U18 Women's European Championship Division C =

International basketball tournament

Tournament details
- Host country: Andorra
- City: Andorra la Vella
- Dates: 30 July – 4 August 2019
- Teams: 7 (from 1 confederation)
- Venue(s): 2 (in 1 host city)

Final positions
- Champions: Armenia (2nd title)
- Runners-up: Malta
- Third place: Georgia

Official website
- www.fiba.basketball

The 2019 FIBA U18 Women's European Championship Division C was the 14th edition of the Division C of the FIBA U18 Women's European Championship, the third tier of the European women's under-18 basketball championship. It was played in Andorra la Vella, Andorra, from 30 July to 4 August 2019. Armenia women's national under-18 basketball team won the tournament and Kayla Keshmeshian was named the tournaments MVP.

== Participating teams ==
- Andorra
- Armenia
- Georgia ▼ (24th place, 2018 FIBA U18 Women's European Championship Division B)
- Gibraltar
- Malta
- Moldova
- Monaco

== First round ==
=== Group A ===
Pos	Team	Pld	W	L	PF	PA	PD	Pts	Qualification
1	Malta	3	3	0	226	108	+118	6	Semifinals
2	Andorra	3	2	1	177	147	+30	5	Semifinals
3	Monaco	3	1	2	143	185	−42	4	5th–7th place classification
4	Moldova	3	0	3	126	232	−106	3	5th–7th place classification

Source: FIBA

30 July 2019

Boxscore

Monaco	29–67	Malta

Poliesportiu Sports Hall

30 July 2019

Boxscore

Moldova	37–69	Andorra

Poliesportiu Sports Hall

31 July 2019

Boxscore

Malta	96–43	Moldova

Poliesportiu Sports Hall

31 July 2019

Boxscore

Andorra	72–47	Monaco

Poliesportiu Sports Hall

1 August 2019

Boxscore

Moldova	46–67	Monaco

Pavelló Joan Alay

1 August 2019

Boxscore

Malta	63–36	Andorra

Pavelló Joan Alay

=== Group B ===
Pos	Team	Pld	W	L	PF	PA	PD	Pts	Qualification
1	Armenia	2	2	0	137	88	+49	4	Semifinals
2	Georgia	2	1	1	114	109	+5	3	Semifinals
3	Gibraltar	2	0	2	68	122	−54	2	5th–7th place classification

Source: FIBA

30 July 2019

Boxscore

Armenia	63–33	Gibraltar

Poliesportiu Sports Hall

31 July 2019

Boxscore

Gibraltar	35–59	Georgia

Poliesportiu Sports Hall

1 August 2019

Boxscore

Georgia	55–74	Armenia

Poliesportiu Sports Hall

== 5th–7th place classification ==
=== Group C ===
Pos	Team	Pld	W	L	PF	PA	PD	Pts
5	Gibraltar	2	2	0	115	76	+39	4
6	Monaco	2	1	1	97	99	−2	3
7	Moldova	2	0	2	92	129	−37	2

Source: FIBA

3 August 2019

Boxscore

Moldova	46–62	Gibraltar

Pavelló Joan Alay

4 August 2019

Boxscore

Gibraltar	53–30	Monaco

Pavelló Joan Alay

== Championship playoffs ==
Semifinals
A1	Malta	53
B2	Georgia	48
B1	Armenia	71
A2	Andorra	61

Final
A1	Malta	73
B1	Armenia	79
3rd place match
B2	Georgia	72
A2	Andorra	45

=== Semifinals ===
3 August 2019

Boxscore

Malta	53–48	Georgia

Poliesportiu Sports Hall

3 August 2019

Boxscore

Armenia	71–61	Andorra

Poliesportiu Sports Hall

=== 3rd place match ===
4 August 2019

Boxscore

Georgia	72–45	Andorra

Poliesportiu Sports Hall

=== Final ===
4 August 2019

Boxscore

Malta	73–79	Armenia

Poliesportiu Sports Hall

== Final standings ==
Rank	Team
1st place, gold medalist(s)	Armenia
2nd place, silver medalist(s)	Malta
3rd place, bronze medalist(s)	Georgia
4	Andorra
5	Gibraltar
6	Monaco
7	Moldova
