= 2018 FIBA U18 Women's European Championship Division C =

International basketball tournament

Tournament details
- Host country: Andorra
- City: Andorra la Vella
- Dates: 24–29 July 2018
- Teams: 4 (from 1 confederation)
- Venue(s): 1 (in 1 host city)

Final positions
- Champions: Gibraltar (1st title)
- Runners-up: Malta
- Third place: Andorra

Official website
- www.fiba.basketball

The 2018 FIBA U18 Women's European Championship Division C was the 13th edition of the Division C of the FIBA U18 Women's European Championship, the third tier of the European women's under-18 basketball championship. It was played in Andorra la Vella, Andorra, from 24 to 29 July 2018. Gibraltar women's national under-18 basketball team won the tournament.

== Participating teams ==
- Andorra
- Gibraltar
- Malta
- Moldova

== First round ==
Pos	Team	Pld	W	L	PF	PA	PD	Pts
1	Malta	3	3	0	195	157	+38	6
2	Moldova	3	2	1	166	157	+9	5
3	Gibraltar	3	1	2	168	173	−5	4
4	Andorra	3	0	3	144	186	−42	3

Source: FIBA

24 July 2018

Boxscore

Moldova	62–51	Gibraltar

Poliesportiu Sports Hall, Andorra la Vella

24 July 2018

Boxscore

Andorra	56–66	Malta

Poliesportiu Sports Hall, Andorra la Vella

25 July 2018

Boxscore

Malta	52–48	Moldova

Poliesportiu Sports Hall, Andorra la Vella

25 July 2018

Boxscore

Gibraltar	64–34	Andorra

Poliesportiu Sports Hall, Andorra la Vella

26 July 2018

Boxscore

Malta	77–53	Gibraltar

Poliesportiu Sports Hall, Andorra la Vella

26 July 2018

Boxscore

Moldova	56–54	Andorra

Poliesportiu Sports Hall, Andorra la Vella

== Playoffs ==
Semifinals
A1	Malta	52
A4	Andorra	44
A2	Moldova	41
A3	Gibraltar	57

Final
A1	Malta	49
A3	Gibraltar	56
3rd place match
A4	Andorra	55
A2	Moldova	41

=== Semifinals ===
28 July 2018

Boxscore

Malta	52–44	Andorra

Poliesportiu Sports Hall, Andorra la Vella

28 July 2018

Boxscore

Moldova	41–57	Gibraltar

Poliesportiu Sports Hall, Andorra la Vella

=== 3rd place match ===
29 July 2018

Boxscore

Andorra	55–41	Moldova

Poliesportiu Sports Hall, Andorra la Vella

=== Final ===
29 July 2018

Boxscore

Malta	49–56	Gibraltar

Poliesportiu Sports Hall, Andorra la Vella

== Final standings ==
Rank	Team
1st place, gold medalist(s)	Gibraltar
2nd place, silver medalist(s)	Malta
3rd place, bronze medalist(s)	Andorra
4	Moldova
