= 2022 FIBA U18 Women's European Championship Division C =

International basketball competition

Tournament details
- Host country: Andorra
- City: Andorra la Vella
- Dates: 26–31 July 2022
- Teams: 6 (from 1 confederation)
- Venue: 1 (in 1 host city)

Final positions
- Champions: Georgia (1st title)
- Runners-up: Malta
- Third place: Albania

Official website
- www.fiba.basketball

The 2022 FIBA U18 Women's European Championship Division C was the 15th edition of the Division C of the FIBA U18 Women's European Championship, the third tier of the European women's under-18 basketball championship. It was played from 26 to 31 July 2022 in Andorra la Vella, Andorra. Georgia won the tournament with Salome Svani being named the most valuable player.

== Participating teams ==
- Albania ▼ (23rd place, 2019 FIBA U18 Women's European Championship Division B)
- Andorra
- Georgia
- Gibraltar
- Malta
- Moldova

== First round ==
The draw of the first round was held on 15 February 2022 in Freising, Germany.

In the first round, the teams were drawn into two groups of three. All teams advance to the playoffs. The winners of both groups advance directly to the semifinals; the other teams will play the quarterfinals.

=== Group A ===
Pos	Team	Pld	W	L	PF	PA	PD	Pts	Qualification
1	Malta	2	2	0	145	107	+38	4	Semifinals
2	Albania	2	1	1	141	116	+25	3	Quarterfinals
3	Andorra	2	0	2	84	147	−63	2	Quarterfinals

Source: FIBA

26 July 2022

Boxscore

Malta	73–66	Albania

Pavelló Joan Alay, Andorra la Vella

27 July 2022

Boxscore

Albania	75–43	Andorra

Pavelló Joan Alay, Andorra la Vella

28 July 2022

Boxscore

Andorra	41–72	Malta

Pavelló Joan Alay, Andorra la Vella

=== Group B ===
Pos	Team	Pld	W	L	PF	PA	PD	Pts	Qualification
1	Georgia	2	2	0	144	68	+76	4	Semifinals
2	Moldova	2	1	1	82	117	−35	3	Quarterfinals
3	Gibraltar	2	0	2	78	119	−41	2	Quarterfinals

Source: FIBA

26 July 2022

Boxscore

Gibraltar	36–69	Georgia

Pavelló Joan Alay, Andorra la Vella

27 July 2022

Boxscore

Georgia	75–32	Moldova

Pavelló Joan Alay, Andorra la Vella

28 July 2022

Boxscore

Moldova	50–42	Gibraltar

Pavelló Joan Alay, Andorra la Vella

== Playoffs ==
Quarterfinals
B2	Moldova	52
A3	Andorra	56
A2	Albania	63
B3	Gibraltar	40

Semifinals
A1	Malta	84
A3	Andorra	48
B1	Georgia	58
A2	Albania	56
5th place match
B3	Gibraltar	53
B2	Moldova	40

Final
A1	Malta	37
B1	Georgia	61
3rd place match
A3	Andorra	73
A2	Albania	79

=== Quarterfinals ===
29 July 2022

Boxscore

Albania	63–40	Gibraltar

Pavelló Joan Alay, Andorra la Vella

29 July 2022

Boxscore

Moldova	52–56	Andorra

Pavelló Joan Alay, Andorra la Vella

=== Semifinals ===
30 July 2022

Boxscore

Georgia	58–56	Albania

Pavelló Joan Alay, Andorra la Vella

30 July 2022

Boxscore

Malta	84–48	Andorra

Pavelló Joan Alay, Andorra la Vella

=== 5th place match ===
31 July 2022

Boxscore

Gibraltar	53–40	Moldova

Pavelló Joan Alay, Andorra la Vella

=== 3rd place match ===
31 July 2022

Boxscore

Andorra	73–79	Albania

Pavelló Joan Alay, Andorra la Vella

=== Final ===
31 July 2022

Boxscore

Malta	37–61	Georgia

Pavelló Joan Alay, Andorra la Vella

== Final standings ==
Rank	Team
1st place, gold medalist(s)	Georgia
2nd place, silver medalist(s)	Malta
3rd place, bronze medalist(s)	Albania
4	Andorra
5	Gibraltar
6	Moldova
