= 2025 FIBA U18 Women's EuroBasket Division C =

Youth international basketball tournament

Tournament details
- Host country: Andorra
- City: Andorra la Vella
- Dates: 22–27 July 2025
- Teams: 7 (from 1 confederation)
- Venue: 1 (in 1 host city)

Final positions
- Champions: Georgia (2nd title)
- Runners-up: Armenia
- Third place: Malta

Official website
- www.fiba.basketball

The 2025 FIBA U18 Women's EuroBasket Division C was the 18th edition of the Division C of the FIBA U18 Women's EuroBasket, the third tier of the European women's under-18 basketball championship. The tournament was played in Andorra la Vella, Andorra, from 22 to 27 July 2025.

== Participating teams ==
- Albania
- Andorra
- Armenia
- Cyprus
- Georgia
- Gibraltar
- Malta

== First round ==
The draw of the first round was held on 28 January 2025 in Freising, Germany.

In the first round, the teams were drawn into two groups. The first two teams from each group advanced to the semifinals; the other teams advanced to the 5th–7th place classification group.

All times are local (Central European Summer Time – UTC+2).

=== Group A ===
Pos	Team	Pld	W	L	PF	PA	PD	Pts	Qualification
1	Armenia	2	2	0	145	84	+61	4	Semifinals
2	Albania	2	1	1	115	111	+4	3	Semifinals
3	Andorra	2	0	2	83	148	−65	2	5th–7th place classification

Source: FIBA

22 July 2025
19:30

Boxscore

Armenia	63–49	Albania
Scoring by quarter: 13–19, 17–5, 14–10, 19–15

Pavelló Joan Alay

23 July 2025
19:30

Boxscore

Albania	66–48	Andorra
Scoring by quarter: 11–9, 20–17, 16–13, 19–9

Pavelló Joan Alay

24 July 2025
19:30

Boxscore

Andorra	35–82	Armenia
Scoring by quarter: 6–17, 11–21, 12–23, 6–21

Pavelló Joan Alay

=== Group B ===
Pos	Team	Pld	W	L	PF	PA	PD	Pts	Qualification
1	Georgia	3	3	0	278	163	+115	6	Semifinals
2	Malta	3	2	1	227	170	+57	5	Semifinals
3	Cyprus	3	1	2	220	161	+59	4	5th–7th place classification
4	Gibraltar	3	0	3	81	312	−231	3	5th–7th place classification

Source: FIBA

22 July 2025
14:30

Boxscore

Cyprus	92–19	Gibraltar
Scoring by quarter: 18–1, 18–3, 25–3, 31–12

Pavelló Joan Alay

22 July 2025
17:00

Boxscore

Malta	67–76	Georgia
Scoring by quarter: 15–17, 15–22, 26–20, 11–17

Pavelló Joan Alay

23 July 2025
14:30

Boxscore

Georgia	71–61	Cyprus
Scoring by quarter: 20–8, 17–13, 17–26, 17–14

Pavelló Joan Alay

23 July 2025
17:00

Boxscore

Gibraltar	27–89	Malta
Scoring by quarter: 6–11, 0–28, 12–30, 9–20

Pavelló Joan Alay

24 July 2025
14:30

Boxscore

Cyprus	67–71	Malta
Scoring by quarter: 18–17, 14–17, 12–14, 23–23

Pavelló Joan Alay

24 July 2025
17:00

Boxscore

Georgia	131–35	Gibraltar
Scoring by quarter: 40–6, 32–15, 23–10, 36–4

Pavelló Joan Alay

== 5th–7th place classification ==
Pos	Team	Pld	W	L	PF	PA	PD	Pts
5	Cyprus	2	2	0	171	48	+123	4
6	Andorra	2	1	1	122	128	−6	3
7	Gibraltar	2	0	2	68	185	−117	2

Source: FIBA

26 July 2025
14:30

Boxscore

Gibraltar	49–93	Andorra
Scoring by quarter: 6–30, 12–28, 19–28, 12–7

Pavelló Joan Alay

27 July 2025
13:30

Boxscore

Andorra	29–79	Cyprus
Scoring by quarter: 11–19, 8–14, 6–26, 4–20

Pavelló Joan Alay

== Championship playoffs ==
Semifinals
A1	Armenia	57
B2	Malta	56
B1	Georgia	104
A2	Albania	72

Final
A1	Armenia	60
B1	Georgia	63
3rd place match
B2	Malta	80
A2	Albania	56

=== Semifinals ===
26 July 2025
17:00

Boxscore

Armenia	57–56	Malta
Scoring by quarter: 16–9, 11–22, 17–15, 13–10

Pavelló Joan Alay

26 July 2025
19:30

Boxscore

Georgia	104–72	Albania
Scoring by quarter: 25–19, 30–11, 27–21, 22–21

Pavelló Joan Alay

=== 3rd place match ===
27 July 2025
16:00

Boxscore

Malta	80–56	Albania
Scoring by quarter: 22–16, 20–9, 20–21, 18–10

Pavelló Joan Alay

=== Final ===
27 July 2025
18:30

Boxscore

Armenia	60–63	Georgia
Scoring by quarter: 16–25, 12–16, 22–8, 10–14

Pavelló Joan Alay

== Final standings ==
Rank	Team
1st place, gold medalist(s)	Georgia
2nd place, silver medalist(s)	Armenia
3rd place, bronze medalist(s)	Malta
4	Albania
5	Cyprus
6	Andorra
7	Gibraltar
