= 2003 European Promotion Cup for Junior Women =

International basketball tournament

Tournament details
- Host country: Iceland
- Dates: 5–9 August 2003
- Teams: 5 (from 1 confederation)
- Venue(s): 1 (in 1 host city)

Final positions
- Champions: Iceland (1st title)
- Runners-up: Scotland
- Third place: Andorra

The 2003 European Promotion Cup for Junior Women was the fourth edition of the basketball European Promotion Cup for U18 women's teams, today known as the FIBA U18 Women's European Championship Division C. It was played in Iceland from 5 to 9 August 2003. The host team, Iceland, won the tournament.

== Participating teams ==
- Andorra
- Gibraltar
- Iceland
- Malta
- Scotland

== Final standings ==
Pos	Team	Pld	W	L	PF	PA	PD	Pts
1	Iceland	4	4	0	340	161	+179	8
2	Scotland	4	3	1	270	207	+63	7
3	Andorra	4	2	2	245	199	+46	6
4	Malta	4	1	3	195	253	−58	5
5	Gibraltar	4	0	4	110	340	−230	4

Source: FIBA Archive

== Results ==
5 August 2003

Boxscore

Scotland	63–56	Andorra

5 August 2003

Boxscore

Iceland	97–15	Gibraltar

6 August 2003

Boxscore

Malta	71–32	Gibraltar

6 August 2003

Boxscore

Iceland	70–52	Andorra

7 August 2003

Boxscore

Scotland	74–46	Malta

7 August 2003

Boxscore

Andorra	89–32	Gibraltar

8 August 2003

Boxscore

Scotland	83–31	Gibraltar

8 August 2003

Boxscore

Iceland	99–44	Malta

9 August 2003

Boxscore

Malta	34–48	Andorra

9 August 2003

Boxscore

Scotland	50–74	Iceland
