= Cyprus men's national under-18 basketball team =

Cyprus
- FIBA zone: FIBA Europe
- National federation: Cyprus Basketball Federation

U19 World Cup
- Appearances: None

U18 EuroBasket
- Appearances: None

U18 EuroBasket Division B
- Appearances: 4
- Medals: None

U18 EuroBasket Division C
- Appearances: 7
- Medals: Gold: 4 (2001, 2019, 2023, 2025); Silver: 2 (2017, 2018); Bronze: 1 (1997)
Home	Away

The Cyprus men's national under-18 basketball team is a national basketball team of Cyprus, administered by the Cyprus Basketball Federation. It represents the country in under-18 men's international basketball competitions.

In 2025, the team competed in Division C of FIBA U18 EuroBasket, where they won the gold medal.

The team won seven medals at the Division C of FIBA U18 EuroBasket.

== FIBA U18 EuroBasket participations ==
Year	Division B	Division C
1997		3rd place, bronze medalist(s)
2001		1st place, gold medalist(s)
2016	24th	
2017		2nd place, silver medalist(s)
2018		2nd place, silver medalist(s)
2019		1st place, gold medalist(s)
2022	22nd	
2023		1st place, gold medalist(s)
2024	22nd	
2025		1st place, gold medalist(s)
2026	22nd	

== Current roster ==
Roster for the 2025 FIBA U18 EuroBasket Division C.

Cyprus men's national U-18 basketball team roster
Players
Coaches

Pos.	No.	Name	Age – Date of birth	Height	Club	Ctr.
SF	1	Giorgos Adamos Solomou	17 – 7 June 2008	1.89 m (6 ft 2 in)	Atlantas Basketball
F	2	Savvas Milinkovic	17 – 22 April 2008	1.92 m (6 ft 4 in)	Achilleas Kaimakli
G	3	Demetris Yallourides	17 – 6 October 2007	1.82 m (6 ft 0 in)	Phoenix MJ Basket
SF	4	Alexandros Constantinou	17 – 7 March 2008	1.92 m (6 ft 4 in)	AEL Limassol B.C.
PG	6	Glafkos Constantinou	18 – 9 March 2007	1.82 m (6 ft 0 in)	Keravnos B.C.
SG	7	Alexandros Papadopoulos	17 – 6 October 2007	1.83 m (6 ft 0 in)	AEK Larnaca B.C.
PF	12	Dimitris Mannaris	18 – 30 April 2007	1.96 m (6 ft 5 in)	Keravnos B.C.
SF	13	Michail Karagiannis	17 – 14 December 2007	1.96 m (6 ft 5 in)	AEK B.C.
F	15	Georgios Marnelos	17 – 28 September 2007	1.95 m (6 ft 5 in)	Keravnos B.C.
F	17	Constantinos Kouzapas	18 – 24 April 2007	1.96 m (6 ft 5 in)	Zinonas
SG	19	Kyriacos Constantinou	17 – 14 January 2008	1.85 m (6 ft 1 in)	Achilleas Kaimakli
PG	34	Ioannis Georgiou	17 – 21 June 2008	1.78 m (5 ft 10 in)	Mantoulidis

Head coach

- (Greece) Dimitrios Koukouris

Assistant coach(es)

- (Cyprus) Stergios Xystouris
- (Cyprus) Georgios Papavasilopoulos

Legend

- Club – describes current
  or most recent club
- Age – describes age
  on 19 July 2025

== Past Rosters ==
=== 2024 ===
Roster for the 2024 FIBA U18 EuroBasket Division B.

Cyprus men's national U-18 basketball team roster
Players
Coaches

Pos.	No.	Name	Age – Date of birth	Height	Club	Ctr.
G	3	Demetris Yiallourides	16 – 6 October 2007	1.82 m (6 ft 0 in)	Phoenix MJ Basket
PG	4	Glafkos Constantinou	17 – 9 March 2007	1.82 m (6 ft 0 in)	Keravnos B.C.
SF	6	Alexandros Kyriacou	18 – 29 June 2006	1.92 m (6 ft 4 in)	Achilleas Kaimakli
SG	8	Stefanos Georgiou	18 – 24 March 2006	1.85 m (6 ft 1 in)	Achilleas Kaimakli
SF	9	Panagiotis Antoniadis	18 – 19 June 2006	1.90 m (6 ft 3 in)	AEL Limassol B.C.
F	11	Alexandros Papamichael	17 – 1 August 2006	1.92 m (6 ft 4 in)	AEK Larnaca B.C.
PF	12	Dimitris Mannaris	17 – 30 April 2007	1.92 m (6 ft 4 in)	Keravnos B.C.
SF	13	Michail Karagiannis	16 – 14 December 2007	1.96 m (6 ft 5 in)	AEK B.C.
SF	15	Maximos Koutouris	18 – 9 May 2006	1.97 m (6 ft 6 in)	AEK Larnaca B.C.
F	17	Constantinos Kouzapas	17 – 24 April 2007	1.96 m (6 ft 5 in)	Zinonas
PG	23	Agathangelo Aslanidis	18 – 21 January 2006	1.91 m (6 ft 3 in)	Keravnos B.C.
PG	45	Ikaros Typografou	18 – 22 February 2006	1.77 m (5 ft 10 in)	Youth Stars BC

Head coach

- (Greece) Dimitrios Koukouris

Assistant coach(es)

- (Cyprus) Stergios Xystouris

Legend

- Club – describes current
  or most recent club
- Age – describes age
  on 24 July 2024

== See also ==
- Cyprus men's national basketball team
- Cyprus men's national under-16 basketball team
- Cyprus women's national under-18 basketball team
