= 2013 FIBA Europe Under-18 Championship for Women Division C =

International basketball tournament

Tournament details
- Host country: Andorra
- City: Andorra la Vella
- Dates: 15–20 July 2013
- Teams: 4 (from 1 confederation)
- Venue(s): 1 (in 1 host city)

Final positions
- Champions: Andorra (1st title)
- Runners-up: Malta
- Third place: Wales

The 2013 FIBA Europe Under-18 Championship for Women Division C was the eighth edition of the Division C of the FIBA U18 Women's European Championship, the third tier of the European women's under-18 basketball championship. It was played in Andorra la Vella, Andorra, from 15 to 20 July 2013. The host team, Andorra, won the tournament.

== Participating teams ==
- Andorra
- Gibraltar
- Malta
- Wales

== First round ==
Pos	Team	Pld	W	L	PF	PA	PD	Pts
1	Andorra	3	3	0	147	68	+79	6
2	Malta	3	2	1	116	98	+18	5
3	Gibraltar	3	1	2	103	148	−45	4
4	Wales	3	0	3	84	136	−52	3

Source: FIBA Archive

15 July 2013

Boxscore

Malta	47–19	Wales

Poliesportiu Sports Hall

15 July 2013

Boxscore

Andorra	62–20	Gibraltar

Poliesportiu Sports Hall

16 July 2013

Boxscore

Gibraltar	36–49	Malta

Poliesportiu Sports Hall

16 July 2013

Boxscore

Wales	28–42	Andorra

Poliesportiu Sports Hall

17 July 2013

Boxscore

Gibraltar	47–37	Wales

Poliesportiu Sports Hall

17 July 2013

Boxscore

Malta	20–43	Andorra

Poliesportiu Sports Hall

== Playoffs ==
Semifinals
A1	Andorra	47
A4	Wales	34
A2	Malta	38
A3	Gibraltar	33

Final
A1	Andorra	51
A2	Malta	41
3rd place match
A4	Wales	66
A3	Gibraltar	39

=== Semifinals ===
19 July 2013

Boxscore

Malta	38–33	Gibraltar

Poliesportiu Sports Hall

19 July 2013

Boxscore

Andorra	47–34	Wales

Poliesportiu Sports Hall

=== 3rd place match ===
20 July 2013

Boxscore

Wales	66–39	Gibraltar

Poliesportiu Sports Hall

=== Final ===
20 July 2013

Boxscore

Andorra	51–41	Malta

Poliesportiu Sports Hall

== Final standings ==
Rank	Team
1st place, gold medalist(s)	Andorra
2nd place, silver medalist(s)	Malta
3rd place, bronze medalist(s)	Wales
4	Gibraltar
