= Albania women's national under-18 basketball team =

Albania
- FIBA zone: FIBA Europe
- National federation: Albanian Basketball Association

U19 World Cup
- Appearances: None

U18 EuroBasket
- Appearances: None

U18 EuroBasket Division B
- Appearances: 5
- Medals: None

U18 EuroBasket Division C
- Appearances: 5
- Medals: (silver) Silver: 1 (2023); (bronze) Bronze: 3 (2005, 2022, 2024)

The Albania women's national under-18 basketball team is a national basketball team of Albania, administered by the Albanian Basketball Association (FSHB) (Albanian: Federata Shqiptare e Basketbollit). It represents the country in under-18 women's international basketball competitions.

The 2023 FIBA European Championship Division C was a premiere for Albania as it was both the first time, Albania hosted the event and it was also the first time Albania reached the final.

Paving the way for Albania's performance were Brikena Mucenji and Anisa Bokrina. The former harvested 23 points and 10 boards, while Bokrina added 21 points, 8 rebounds and 3 steals in the Semi-Finals against Andorra.

== FIBA U18 Women's EuroBasket participations ==
Year	Division B	Division C
2005		3rd place, bronze medalist(s)
2015	20th	
2016	19th	
2017	22nd	
2018	21st	
2019	23rd	
2022		3rd place, bronze medalist(s)
2023		2nd place, silver medalist(s)
2024		3rd place, bronze medalist(s)
2025		4th

== See also ==
- Albania women's national basketball team
- Albania women's national under-16 basketball team
- Albania men's national under-18 basketball team
