= 2007 FIBA Europe Under-18 Championship for Women Division C =

International basketball tournament

Tournament details
- Host country: Malta
- City: Valletta
- Dates: 28 August – 1 September 2007
- Teams: 5 (from 1 confederation)
- Venue(s): 1 (in 1 host city)

Final positions
- Champions: Malta (1st title)
- Runners-up: Andorra
- Third place: Monaco

The 2007 FIBA Europe Under-18 Championship for Women Division C was the sixth edition of the Division C of the FIBA U18 Women's European Championship, the third tier of the European women's under-18 basketball championship. It was played in Valletta, Malta, from 28 August to 1 September 2007. The host team, Malta, won the tournament.

== Participating teams ==
- Andorra
- Gibraltar
- Luxembourg
- Malta
- Monaco

== Final standings ==
Pos	Team	Pld	W	L	PF	PA	PD	Pts
1	Malta	4	4	0	219	166	+53	8
2	Andorra	4	3	1	196	180	+16	7
3	Monaco	4	2	2	259	181	+78	6
4	Luxembourg	4	1	3	203	228	−25	5
5	Gibraltar	4	0	4	121	243	−122	4

Source: FIBA Archive

== Results ==
28 August 2007

Boxscore

Luxembourg	60–45	Gibraltar

28 August 2007

Boxscore

Andorra	37–48	Malta

29 August 2007

Boxscore

Gibraltar	32–48	Andorra

29 August 2007

Boxscore

Monaco	75–44	Luxembourg

30 August 2007

Boxscore

Andorra	51–45	Monaco

30 August 2007

Boxscore

Malta	59–22	Gibraltar

31 August 2007

Boxscore

Luxembourg	55–60	Andorra

31 August 2007

Boxscore

Monaco	63–64	Malta

1 September 2007

Boxscore

Gibraltar	22–76	Monaco

1 September 2007

Boxscore

Malta	48–44	Luxembourg
