= 2001 European Promotion Cup for Junior Women =

International basketball tournament

Tournament details
- Host country: Cyprus
- City: Nicosia
- Dates: 18–22 July 2001
- Teams: 7 (from 1 confederation)
- Venue(s): 1 (in 1 host city)

Final positions
- Champions: Cyprus (1st title)
- Runners-up: Luxembourg
- Third place: Scotland

The 2001 European Promotion Cup for Junior Women was the third edition of the basketball European Promotion Cup for U18 women's teams, today known as the FIBA U18 Women's European Championship Division C. It was played in Nicosia, Cyprus, from 18 to 22 July 2001. The host team, Cyprus, won the tournament.

== Participating teams ==
- Andorra
- Cyprus
- Gibraltar
- Iceland
- Luxembourg
- Malta
- Scotland

== First round ==
=== Group A ===
Pos	Team	Pld	W	L	PF	PA	PD	Pts	Qualification
1	Scotland	2	2	0	127	85	+42	4	Semifinals
2	Iceland	2	1	1	114	96	+18	3	Semifinals
3	Malta	2	0	2	75	135	−60	2	5th–7th place classification

Source: FIBA Archive

18 July 2001

Boxscore

Iceland	63–41	Malta

19 July 2001

Boxscore

Malta	34–72	Scotland

20 July 2001

Boxscore

Scotland	55–51	Iceland

=== Group B ===
Pos	Team	Pld	W	L	PF	PA	PD	Pts	Qualification
1	Luxembourg	3	3	0	213	117	+96	6	Semifinals
2	Cyprus	3	2	1	215	111	+104	5	Semifinals
3	Andorra	3	1	2	152	157	−5	4	5th–7th place classification
4	Gibraltar	3	0	3	49	244	−195	3	5th–7th place classification

Source: FIBA Archive

18 July 2001

Boxscore

Andorra	65–13	Gibraltar

18 July 2001

Boxscore

Cyprus	52–53	Luxembourg

19 July 2001

Boxscore

Luxembourg	70–46	Andorra

19 July 2001

Boxscore

Gibraltar	17–89	Cyprus

20 July 2001

Boxscore

Luxembourg	90–19	Gibraltar

20 July 2001

Boxscore

Cyprus	74–41	Andorra

== 5th–7th place classification ==
Pos	Team	Pld	W	L	PF	PA	PD	Pts
5	Andorra	2	2	0	138	61	+77	4
6	Malta	2	1	1	131	114	+17	3
7	Gibraltar	2	0	2	54	148	−94	2

Source: FIBA Archive

21 July 2001

Boxscore

Gibraltar	41–83	Malta

22 July 2001

Boxscore

Malta	48–73	Andorra

== Playoffs ==
Semifinals
B2	Cyprus	66
A1	Scotland	54
B1	Luxembourg	74
A2	Iceland	33

Final
B2	Cyprus	67
B1	Luxembourg	57
3rd place match
A2	Iceland	45
A1	Scotland	54

=== Semifinals ===
21 July 2001

Boxscore

Luxembourg	74–33	Iceland

21 July 2001

Boxscore

Cyprus	66–54	Scotland

=== 3rd place match ===
22 July 2001

Boxscore

Iceland	45–54	Scotland

=== Final ===
22 July 2001

Boxscore

Cyprus	67–57	Luxembourg

== Final standings ==
Rank	Team
1st place, gold medalist(s)	Cyprus
2nd place, silver medalist(s)	Luxembourg
3rd place, bronze medalist(s)	Scotland
4	Iceland
5	Andorra
6	Malta
7	Gibraltar
