= 2015 FIBA Europe Under-18 Championship for Women Division C =

International basketball tournament

Tournament details
- Host country: Gibraltar
- Dates: 6–11 July 2015
- Teams: 5 (from 1 confederation)
- Venue: 1 (in 1 host city)

Final positions
- Champions: Scotland (3rd title)
- Runners-up: Malta
- Third place: Wales

Official website
- www.fibaeurope.com

The 2015 FIBA Europe Under-18 Championship for Women Division C was the 10th edition of the Division C of the FIBA U18 Women's European Championship, the third tier of the European women's under-18 basketball championship. It was played in Gibraltar from 6 to 11 July 2015. Scotland women's national under-18 basketball team won the tournament.

== Participating teams ==
- Andorra
- Gibraltar
- Malta
- Scotland
- Wales

== Final standings ==
Pos	Team	Pld	W	L	PF	PA	PD	Pts
1	Scotland	4	4	0	309	147	+162	8
2	Malta	4	3	1	207	206	+1	7
3	Wales	4	2	2	164	203	−39	6
4	Andorra	4	1	3	197	208	−11	5
5	Gibraltar	4	0	4	137	250	−113	4

Source: FIBA Archive

== Results ==
6 July 2015

Boxscore

Wales	25–73	Scotland

Tercentenary Sports Hall

6 July 2015

Boxscore

Malta	57–51	Andorra

Tercentenary Sports Hall

7 July 2015

Boxscore

Scotland	82–39	Malta

Tercentenary Sports Hall

7 July 2015

Boxscore

Gibraltar	30–48	Wales

Tercentenary Sports Hall

8 July 2015

Boxscore

Andorra	48–61	Scotland

Tercentenary Sports Hall

8 July 2015

Boxscore

Malta	60–34	Gibraltar

Tercentenary Sports Hall

10 July 2015

Boxscore

Wales	39–51	Malta

Tercentenary Sports Hall

10 July 2015

Boxscore

Gibraltar	38–49	Andorra

Tercentenary Sports Hall

11 July 2015

Boxscore

Andorra	49–52	Wales

Tercentenary Sports Hall

11 July 2015

Boxscore

Scotland	93–35	Gibraltar

Tercentenary Sports Hall
