= Monaco women's national under-18 basketball team =

Monaco
- FIBA zone: FIBA Europe
- National federation: Fédération Monégasque de Basketball

U19 World Cup
- Appearances: None

U18 European Championship
- Appearances: None

U18 European Championship Division B
- Appearances: None

U18 European Championship Division C
- Appearances: 5
- Medals: (silver) Silver: 1 (2009); (bronze) Bronze: 1 (2007)

The Monaco women's national under-18 basketball team is a national basketball team of Monaco, administered by the Fédération Monégasque de Basketball. It represents the country in women's international under-18 basketball competitions.

== FIBA U18 Women's European Championship participations ==
Year	Result in Division C
2005	6th
2007	3rd place, bronze medalist(s)
2009	2nd place, silver medalist(s)
2014	5th
2019	6th

== See also ==
- Monaco women's national under-16 basketball team
- Monaco men's national under-18 basketball team
