= Luxembourg women's national under-18 basketball team =

Luxembourg
- FIBA zone: FIBA Europe
- National federation: Luxembourg Basketball Federation

U19 World Cup
- Appearances: None

U18 EuroBasket
- Appearances: 1
- Medals: None

U18 EuroBasket Division B
- Appearances: 13
- Medals: (silver) Silver: 1 (2023)

U18 EuroBasket Division C
- Appearances: 4
- Medals: (gold) Gold: 1 (2009); (silver) Silver: 2 (2001, 2005)

The Luxembourg women's national under-18 basketball team is a national basketball team of Luxembourg, administered by the Luxembourg Basketball Federation. It represents the country in under-18 women's international basketball competitions.

== FIBA U18 Women's EuroBasket participations ==
| Year | Division A | Division B | Division C |
|---|---|---|---|
| 2001 | | | 2nd place, silver medalist(s) |
| 2005 | | | 2nd place, silver medalist(s) |
| 2005 | | 13th | |
| 2007 | | | 4th |
| 2007 | | 19th | |
| 2008 | | 15th | |
| 2009 | | | 1st place, gold medalist(s) |
| 2010 | | 17th | |
| 2011 | | 14th | |

| Year | Division A | Division B | Division C |
|---|---|---|---|
| 2014 | | 14th | |
| 2015 | | 14th | |
| 2017 | | 18th | |
| 2018 | | 12th | |
| 2019 | | 14th | |
| 2022 | | 10th | |
| 2023 | | 2nd place, silver medalist(s) | |
| 2024 | 16th | | |
| 2025 | | 11th | |

== See also ==
- Luxembourg women's national basketball team
- Luxembourg women's national under-16 basketball team
- Luxembourg men's national under-18 basketball team
