= Azerbaijan women's national under-18 basketball team =

Youth national basketball team

Azerbaijan
- FIBA zone: FIBA Europe
- National federation: Azerbaijan Basketball Federation

U19 World Cup
- Appearances: None

U18 EuroBasket
- Appearances: None

U18 EuroBasket Division B
- Appearances: 1
- Medals: None

U18 EuroBasket Division C
- Appearances: 1
- Medals: (silver) Silver: 1 (2024)

The Azerbaijan women's national under-18 basketball team is a national basketball team of Azerbaijan, administered by the Azerbaijan Basketball Federation. It represents the country in international under-18 women's basketball competitions.

== FIBA U18 Women's EuroBasket record ==
Year	Division B	Division C	Pld	W	L
2024	-	2nd place, silver medalist(s)	5	4	1
2025	12th	-	8	4	4
Total	1/19	1/18	13	8	5

== See also ==
- Azerbaijan women's national basketball team
- Azerbaijan women's national under-16 basketball team
- Azerbaijan men's national under-18 basketball team
