= 2009 FIBA Europe Under-18 Championship for Women Division C =

International basketball tournament

Tournament details
- Host country: Malta
- Dates: 14–18 July 2009
- Teams: 5 (from 1 confederation)
- Venue(s): 1 (in 1 host city)

Final positions
- Champions: Luxembourg (1st title)
- Runners-up: Monaco
- Third place: Malta

The 2009 FIBA Europe Under-18 Championship for Women Division C was the seventh edition of the Division C of the FIBA U18 Women's European Championship, the third tier of the European women's under-18 basketball championship. It was played in Malta from 14 to 18 July 2009. Luxembourg women's national under-18 basketball team won the tournament.

== Participating teams ==
- Gibraltar
- Luxembourg
- Malta
- Moldova
- Monaco

== Final standings ==
Pos	Team	Pld	W	L	PF	PA	PD	Pts
1	Luxembourg	4	4	0	361	142	+219	8
2	Monaco	4	3	1	252	229	+23	7
3	Malta	4	2	2	225	231	−6	6
4	Moldova	4	1	3	198	267	−69	5
5	Gibraltar	4	0	4	178	345	−167	4

Source: FIBA Archive

== Results ==
14 July 2009

Boxscore

Moldova	40–63	Monaco

14 July 2009

Boxscore

Malta	18–87	Luxembourg

15 July 2009

Boxscore

Luxembourg	85–25	Moldova

15 July 2009

Boxscore

Gibraltar	27–88	Malta

16 July 2009

Boxscore

Monaco	58–79	Luxembourg

16 July 2009

Boxscore

Moldova	84–61	Gibraltar

17 July 2009

Boxscore

Gibraltar	49–63	Monaco

17 July 2009

Boxscore

Malta	58–49	Moldova

18 July 2009

Boxscore

Luxembourg	110–41	Gibraltar

18 July 2009

Boxscore

Monaco	68–61	Malta
