= 2014 FIBA Europe Under-18 Championship for Women Division C =

International basketball tournament

Tournament details
- Host country: Andorra
- City: Andorra la Vella
- Dates: 22–27 July 2014
- Teams: 6 (from 1 confederation)
- Venue(s): 1 (in 1 host city)

Final positions
- Champions: Cyprus (2nd title)
- Runners-up: Malta
- Third place: Andorra

The 2014 FIBA Europe Under-18 Championship for Women Division C was the ninth edition of the Division C of the FIBA U18 Women's European Championship, the third tier of the European women's under-18 basketball championship. It was played in Andorra la Vella, Andorra, from 22 to 27 July 2014. Cyprus women's national under-18 basketball team won the tournament.

== Participating teams ==
- Andorra
- Cyprus
- Gibraltar
- Malta
- Monaco
- Wales

== First round ==
=== Group A ===
Pos	Team	Pld	W	L	PF	PA	PD	Pts	Qualification
1	Malta	2	2	0	106	81	+25	4	Semifinals
2	Andorra	2	1	1	110	80	+30	3	Quarterfinals
3	Gibraltar	2	0	2	70	125	−55	2	Quarterfinals

Source: FIBA Archive

22 July 2014

Boxscore

Gibraltar	42–54	Malta

Poliesportiu Sports Hall

23 July 2014

Boxscore

Malta	52–39	Andorra

Poliesportiu Sports Hall

24 July 2014

Boxscore

Andorra	71–28	Gibraltar

Poliesportiu Sports Hall

=== Group B ===
Pos	Team	Pld	W	L	PF	PA	PD	Pts	Qualification
1	Cyprus	2	2	0	133	52	+81	4	Semifinals
2	Monaco	2	1	1	91	122	−31	3	Quarterfinals
3	Wales	2	0	2	70	120	−50	2	Quarterfinals

Source: FIBA Archive

22 July 2014

Boxscore

Wales	48–61	Monaco

Poliesportiu Sports Hall

23 July 2014

Boxscore

Monaco	30–74	Cyprus

Poliesportiu Sports Hall

24 July 2014

Boxscore

Cyprus	59–22	Wales

Poliesportiu Sports Hall

== Playoffs ==
Quarterfinals
B2	Monaco	39
A3	Gibraltar	41
A2	Andorra	58
B3	Wales	44

Semifinals
A1	Malta	57
A3	Gibraltar	22
B1	Cyprus	74
A2	Andorra	38
5th place match
B3	Wales	34
B2	Monaco	47

Final
A1	Malta	53
B1	Cyprus	67
3rd place match
A3	Gibraltar	47
A2	Andorra	56

=== Quarterfinals ===
25 July 2014

Boxscore

Monaco	39–41	Gibraltar

Poliesportiu Sports Hall

25 July 2014

Boxscore

Andorra	58–44	Wales

Poliesportiu Sports Hall

=== Semifinals ===
26 July 2014

Boxscore

Malta	57–22	Gibraltar

Poliesportiu Sports Hall

26 July 2014

Boxscore

Cyprus	74–38	Andorra

Poliesportiu Sports Hall

=== 5th place match ===
26 July 2014

Boxscore

Wales	34–47	Monaco

Poliesportiu Sports Hall

=== 3rd place match ===
27 July 2014

Boxscore

Gibraltar	47–56	Andorra

Poliesportiu Sports Hall

=== Final ===
27 July 2014

Boxscore

Malta	53–67	Cyprus

Poliesportiu Sports Hall

== Final standings ==
Rank	Team
1st place, gold medalist(s)	Cyprus
2nd place, silver medalist(s)	Malta
3rd place, bronze medalist(s)	Andorra
4	Gibraltar
5	Monaco
6	Wales
