= Moldova women's national under-18 basketball team =

Moldova
- FIBA zone: FIBA Europe
- National federation: Basketball Federation of Moldova

U19 World Cup
- Appearances: None

U18 European Championship
- Appearances: None

U18 European Championship Division B
- Appearances: 1
- Medals: None

U18 European Championship Division C
- Appearances: 5
- Medals: None

The Moldova women's national under-18 basketball team is a national basketball team of Moldova, administered by the Basketball Federation of Moldova. It represents the country in women's international under-18 basketball competitions.

== FIBA U18 Women's European Championship participations ==
Year	Division B	Division C
2009		4th
2017	23rd	
2018		4th
2019		7th
2022		6th
2023		7th

== See also ==
- Moldova women's national basketball team
- Moldova women's national under-16 basketball team
- Moldova men's national under-18 basketball team
