= 1999 European Promotion Cup for Junior Women =

International basketball tournament

Tournament details
- Host country: Cyprus
- City: Nicosia
- Dates: 28 July – 1 August 1999
- Teams: 7 (from 1 confederation)
- Venue(s): 1 (in 1 host city)

Final positions
- Champions: Scotland (1st title)
- Runners-up: Andorra
- Third place: Armenia

The 1999 European Promotion Cup for Junior Women was the second edition of the basketball European Promotion Cup for U18 women's teams, today known as the FIBA U18 Women's European Championship Division C. It was played in Nicosia, Cyprus, from 28 July to 1 August 1999. Scotland women's national under-18 basketball team won the tournament.

== Participating teams ==
- Andorra
- Armenia
- Cyprus
- Gibraltar
- Iceland
- Malta
- Scotland

== First round ==
=== Group A ===
| Pos | Team | Pld | W | L | PF | PA | PD | Pts | Qualification |
|---|---|---|---|---|---|---|---|---|---|
| 1 | Armenia | 3 | 3 | 0 | 234 | 117 | +117 | 6 | Semifinals |
| 2 | Cyprus | 3 | 2 | 1 | 237 | 120 | +117 | 5 | Semifinals |
| 3 | Malta | 3 | 1 | 2 | 124 | 154 | −30 | 4 | 5th–7th place playoffs |
| 4 | Gibraltar | 3 | 0 | 3 | 62 | 266 | −204 | 3 | 5th–7th place playoffs |

Source: FIBA Archive

28 July 1999

Boxscore

| Armenia | 94–21 | Gibraltar |

28 July 1999

Boxscore

| Cyprus | 64–29 | Malta |

29 July 1999

Boxscore

| Malta | 38–71 | Armenia |

29 July 1999

Boxscore

| Gibraltar | 22–115 | Cyprus |

30 July 1999

Boxscore

| Malta | 57–19 | Gibraltar |

30 July 1999

Boxscore

| Armenia | 69–58 | Cyprus |

=== Group B ===
| Pos | Team | Pld | W | L | PF | PA | PD | Pts | Qualification |
|---|---|---|---|---|---|---|---|---|---|
| 1 | Scotland | 2 | 2 | 0 | 138 | 104 | +34 | 4 | Semifinals |
| 2 | Andorra | 2 | 1 | 1 | 109 | 117 | −8 | 3 | Semifinals |
| 3 | Iceland | 2 | 0 | 2 | 94 | 120 | −26 | 2 | 5th–7th place playoffs |

Source: FIBA Archive

28 July 1999

Boxscore

| Iceland | 48–67 | Scotland |

29 July 1999

Boxscore

| Andorra | 53–46 | Iceland |

30 July 1999

Boxscore

| Scotland | 71–56 | Andorra |

== 5th–7th place playoffs ==
| 5th–7th place semifinal | | | 5th place match |
| | | | B3 | Iceland | 52 |
| A4 | Gibraltar | 32 | A3 | Malta | 37 |
| B3 | Iceland | 77 |

=== 5th–7th place semifinal ===
31 July 1999

Boxscore

| Gibraltar | 32–77 | Iceland |

=== 5th place match ===
1 August 1999

Boxscore

| Iceland | 52–37 | Malta |

== Championship playoffs ==
Semifinals
A2 | Cyprus | 48
B1 | Scotland | 65
B2 | Andorra | 53
A1 | Armenia | 44

Final
B1 | Scotland | 67
B2 | Andorra | 49
3rd place match
A1 | Cyprus | 62
A2 | Armenia | 67

=== Semifinals ===
31 July 1999

Boxscore

| Cyprus | 48–65 | Scotland |

31 July 1999

Boxscore

| Andorra | 53–44 | Armenia |

=== 3rd place match ===
1 August 1999

Boxscore

| Cyprus | 62–67 | Armenia |

=== Final ===
1 August 1999

Boxscore

| Scotland | 67–49 | Andorra |

== Final standings ==
| Rank | Team |
|---|---|
| 1st place, gold medalist(s) | Scotland |
| 2nd place, silver medalist(s) | Andorra |
| 3rd place, bronze medalist(s) | Armenia |
| 4 | Cyprus |
| 5 | Iceland |
| 6 | Malta |
| 7 | Gibraltar |
