= 2017 FIBA U18 Women's European Championship Division C =

International basketball tournament

Tournament details
- Host country: Malta
- City: Pembroke
- Dates: 4–9 July 2017
- Teams: 5 (from 1 confederation)
- Venue(s): 1 (in 1 host city)

Final positions
- Champions: Cyprus (3rd title)
- Runners-up: Armenia
- Third place: Malta

Official website
- www.fiba.basketball

The 2017 FIBA U18 Women's European Championship Division C was the 12th edition of the Division C of the FIBA U18 Women's European Championship, the third tier of the European women's under-18 basketball championship. It was played in Pembroke, Malta, from 4 to 9 July 2017. Cyprus women's national under-18 basketball team won the tournament.

== Participating teams ==
- Armenia
- Cyprus
- Gibraltar
- Kosovo
- Malta

== Final standings ==
Pos	Team	Pld	W	L	PF	PA	PD	Pts	Promotion
1	Cyprus	4	4	0	270	160	+110	8	2018 Division B
2	Armenia	4	3	1	258	204	+54	7	
3	Malta	4	2	2	198	242	−44	6	
4	Gibraltar	4	1	3	209	257	−48	5	
5	Kosovo	4	0	4	178	250	−72	4	

Source: FIBA

== Results ==
4 July 2017

Boxscore

Cyprus	54–35	Armenia

SkolaSport Gym, Pembroke

4 July 2017

Boxscore

Malta	55–51	Gibraltar

SkolaSport Gym, Pembroke

5 July 2017

Boxscore

Kosovo	34–70	Cyprus

SkolaSport Gym, Pembroke

5 July 2017

Boxscore

Armenia	83–53	Malta

SkolaSport Gym, Pembroke

6 July 2017

Boxscore

Gibraltar	45–72	Armenia

SkolaSport Gym, Pembroke

6 July 2017

Boxscore

Malta	38–37	Kosovo

SkolaSport Gym, Pembroke

8 July 2017

Boxscore

Kosovo	55–74	Gibraltar

SkolaSport Gym, Pembroke

8 July 2017

Boxscore

Cyprus	71–52	Malta

SkolaSport Gym, Pembroke

9 July 2017

Boxscore

Armenia	68–52	Kosovo

SkolaSport Gym, Pembroke

9 July 2017

Boxscore

Gibraltar	39–75	Cyprus

SkolaSport Gym, Pembroke
