= Malta women's national under-18 basketball team =

Malta
- FIBA zone: FIBA Europe
- National federation: Malta Basketball Association

U19 World Cup
- Appearances: None

U18 EuroBasket
- Appearances: None

U18 EuroBasket Division B
- Appearances: None

U18 EuroBasket Division C
- Appearances: 18
- Medals: (gold) Gold: 2 (2007, 2023); (silver) Silver: 6 (2013, 2014, 2015, 2018, 2019, 2022); (bronze) Bronze: 4 (2009, 2016, 2017, 2025)

The Malta women's national under-18 basketball team is a national basketball team of Malta, administered by the Malta Basketball Association. It represents the country in under-18 women's international basketball competitions.

== FIBA U18 Women's EuroBasket participations ==
| Year | Result in Division C |
|---|---|
| 1997 | 6th |
| 1999 | 6th |
| 2001 | 6th |
| 2003 | 4th |
| 2005 | 4th |
| 2007 | 1st place, gold medalist(s) |
| 2009 | 3rd place, bronze medalist(s) |
| 2013 | 2nd place, silver medalist(s) |
| 2014 | 2nd place, silver medalist(s) |

| Year | Result in Division C |
|---|---|
| 2015 | 2nd place, silver medalist(s) |
| 2016 | 3rd place, bronze medalist(s) |
| 2017 | 3rd place, bronze medalist(s) |
| 2018 | 2nd place, silver medalist(s) |
| 2019 | 2nd place, silver medalist(s) |
| 2022 | 2nd place, silver medalist(s) |
| 2023 | 1st place, gold medalist(s) |
| 2024 | 6th |
| 2025 | 3rd place, bronze medalist(s) |

== See also ==
- Malta women's national basketball team
- Malta women's national under-16 basketball team
- Malta men's national under-18 basketball team
