= Gibraltar women's national under-18 basketball team =

Gibraltar
- FIBA zone: FIBA Europe
- National federation: Gibraltar Amateur Basketball Association

U19 World Cup
- Appearances: None

U18 EuroBasket
- Appearances: None

U18 EuroBasket Division B
- Appearances: None

U18 EuroBasket Division C
- Appearances: 16
- Medals: (gold) Gold: 1 (2018)

The Gibraltar women's national under-18 basketball team is a national basketball team of Gibraltar, administered by the Gibraltar Amateur Basketball Association. It represents the country in under-18 women's international basketball competitions.

== FIBA U18 Women's EuroBasket participations ==
Year	Result in Division C
1997	8th
1999	7th
2001	7th
2003	5th
2005	7th
2007	5th
2009	5th
2013	4th

Year	Result in Division C
2014	4th
2015	5th
2016	7th
2017	4th
2018	1st place, gold medalist(s)
2019	5th
2022	5th
2025	7th

== See also ==
- Gibraltar women's national basketball team
- Gibraltar women's national under-16 basketball team
- Gibraltar men's national under-18 basketball team
