= Armenia women's national under-18 basketball team =

Armenia
- FIBA zone: FIBA Europe
- National federation: Basketball Federation of Armenia

U19 World Cup
- Appearances: None

U18 EuroBasket
- Appearances: None

U18 EuroBasket Division B
- Appearances: None

U18 EuroBasket Division C
- Appearances: 8
- Medals: (gold) Gold: 2 (2016, 2019); (silver) Silver: 2 (2017, 2025); (bronze) Bronze: 3 (1997, 1999, 2023)

The Armenia women's national under-18 basketball team is a national basketball team of Armenia, administered by the Basketball Federation of Armenia. It represents the country in under-18 women's international basketball competitions.

== FIBA U18 Women's EuroBasket participations ==
Year	Result in Division C
1997	3rd place, bronze medalist(s)
1999	3rd place, bronze medalist(s)
2016	1st place, gold medalist(s)
2017	2nd place, silver medalist(s)
2019	1st place, gold medalist(s)
2023	3rd place, bronze medalist(s)
2024	7th
2025	2nd place, silver medalist(s)

== See also ==
- Armenia women's national basketball team
- Armenia women's national under-16 basketball team
- Armenia men's national under-18 basketball team
