= Georgia women's national under-18 basketball team =

Georgia
- FIBA zone: FIBA Europe
- National federation: Georgian Basketball Federation

U19 World Cup
- Appearances: None

U18 EuroBasket
- Appearances: None

U18 EuroBasket Division B
- Appearances: 2
- Medals: None

U18 EuroBasket Division C
- Appearances: 5
- Medals: (gold) Gold: 2 (2022, 2025); (silver) Silver: 1 (2016); (bronze) Bronze: 1 (2019)

The Georgia women's national under-18 basketball team is a national basketball team of Georgia, administered by the Georgian Basketball Federation. It represents the country in under-18 women's international basketball competitions.

== FIBA U18 Women's EuroBasket participations ==
Year	Division B	Division C
2016		2nd place, silver medalist(s)
2017	20th	
2018	24th	
2019		3rd place, bronze medalist(s)
2022		1st place, gold medalist(s)
2024		5th
2025		1st place, gold medalist(s)

== See also ==
- Georgia women's national basketball team
- Georgia women's national under-16 basketball team
- Georgia men's national under-18 basketball team
