= Scotland women's national under-18 basketball team =

Scottish basketball team

Scotland
- FIBA zone: FIBA Europe
- National federation: Basketballscotland

U19 World Cup
- Appearances: None

U18 European Championship
- Appearances: 1
- Medals: None

U18 European Championship Division B
- Appearances: 6
- Medals: None

U18 European Championship Division C
- Appearances: 6
- Medals: Gold: 3 (1999, 2005, 2015); Silver: 1 (2003); Bronze: 1 (2001)

The Scotland women's national under-18 basketball team is a national basketball team of Scotland, administered by the Basketballscotland. It represents the country in women's international under-18 basketball competitions.

The team finished 11th at the 1971 FIBA European Championship for Junior Women. They also participated at several FIBA U18 Women's European Championship Division B tournaments and they won three gold medals at the FIBA U18 Women's European Championship Division C.

== See also ==
- Scotland women's national basketball team
- Scotland women's national under-16 basketball team
- Scotland men's national under-18 basketball team
