= Cyprus women's national under-18 basketball team =

Cyprus
- FIBA zone: FIBA Europe
- National federation: Cyprus Basketball Federation

U19 World Cup
- Appearances: None

U18 EuroEuroBasket
- Appearances: None

U18 EuroBasket Division B
- Appearances: 2
- Medals: None

U18 EuroBasket Division C
- Appearances: 7
- Medals: (gold) Gold: 3 (2001, 2014, 2017)

The Cyprus women's national under-18 team is a national basketball team of Cyprus, administered by the Cyprus Basketball Federation. It represents the country in under-18 women's international basketball competitions.

== FIBA U18 Women's EuroBasket participations ==
Year	Division B	Division C
1999		4th
2001		1st place, gold medalist(s)
2014		1st place, gold medalist(s)
2015	19th	
2017		1st place, gold medalist(s)
2018	16th	
2023		5th
2024		4th
2025		5th

== See also ==
- Cyprus women's national basketball team
- Cyprus women's national under-16 basketball team
- Cyprus men's national under-18 basketball team
