= Andorra women's national under-18 basketball team =

Andorra
- FIBA zone: FIBA Europe
- National federation: Andorran Basketball Federation

U19 World Cup
- Appearances: None

U18 EuroBasket
- Appearances: None

U18 EuroBasket Division B
- Appearances: None

U18 EuroBasket Division C
- Appearances: 15
- Medals: (gold) Gold: 1 (2013); (silver) Silver: 2 (1999, 2007); (bronze) Bronze: 3 (2003, 2014, 2018)

The Andorra women's national under-18 basketball team is a national basketball team of Andorra, administered by the Andorran Basketball Federation. It represents the country in under-18 women's international basketball competitions.

== FIBA U18 Women's EuroBasket participations ==
Year	Result in Division C
1997	5th
1999	2nd place, silver medalist(s)
2001	5th
2003	3rd place, bronze medalist(s)
2005	5th
2007	2nd place, silver medalist(s)
2013	1st place, gold medalist(s)
2014	3rd place, bronze medalist(s)

Year	Result in Division C
2015	4th
2016	4th
2018	3rd place, bronze medalist(s)
2019	4th
2022	4th
2023	4th
2025	6th

== See also ==
- Andorra women's national basketball team
- Andorra women's national under-16 basketball team
- Andorra men's national under-18 basketball team
