= Kosovo women's national under-18 basketball team =

Kosovo's national basketball team

Kosovo
- FIBA zone: FIBA Europe
- National federation: Kosovo Basketball Federation

U19 World Cup
- Appearances: None

U18 EuroBasket
- Appearances: None

U18 EuroBasket Division B
- Appearances: 3
- Medals: None

U18 EuroBasket Division C
- Appearances: 4
- Medals: (gold) Gold: 1 (2024)

The Kosovo women's national under-18 basketball team is a national basketball team of Kosovo, administered by the Kosovo Basketball Federation. It represents the country in under-18 women's international basketball competitions.

== FIBA U18 Women's EuroBasket participations ==
| Year | Division B | Division C |
|---|---|---|
| 2016 | | 5th |
| 2017 | | 5th |
| 2018 | 22nd | |
| 2019 | 22nd | |
| 2023 | | 6th |
| 2024 | | 1st place, gold medalist(s) |
| 2025 | 21st | |

== See also ==
- Kosovo women's national basketball team
- Kosovo women's national under-16 basketball team
- Kosovo men's national under-18 basketball team
