= Wales women's national under-18 basketball team =

Wales
- FIBA zone: FIBA Europe
- National federation: Basketball Wales

U19 World Cup
- Appearances: None

U18 European Championship
- Appearances: None

U18 European Championship Division B
- Appearances: None

U18 European Championship Division C
- Appearances: 6
- Medals: Bronze: 2 (2013, 2015)

The Wales women's national under-18 basketball team is a national basketball team of Wales, administered by the Basketball Wales. It represents the country in women's international under-18 basketball competitions.

The team participated 6 times at the FIBA U18 Women's European Championship Division C and won bronze medals in 2013 and 2015.

== See also ==
- Wales women's national basketball team
- Wales women's national under-16 basketball team
- Wales men's national under-18 basketball team
