= 2013 FIBA Europe Under-18 Championship for Women =

2013 FIBA U18 Women's European Championship
30th FIBA Under-18 Women's European Basketball Championship

Tournament details
- Host country: Croatia
- Dates: 15–25 August 2013
- Teams: 16
- Venues: 2 (in 2 host cities)

Final positions
- Champions: Spain (4th title)

Tournament statistics
- MVP: (Spain) Leticia Romero

Official website
- www.fibaeurope.com

The 2013 FIBA Europe Under-18 Championship for Women was the 30th edition of the European Under-18 Women's Basketball Championship. 16 teams featured in the competition, held in Vukovar and Vinkovci, Croatia, from 15 to 25 August 2013.

== Participating teams ==
- Belarus ▲ (Winners, 2012 FIBA Europe Women's Under-18 Championship Division B)
- Croatia
- Czech Republic
- England ▲ (Runners-up, 2012 FIBA Europe Women's Under-18 Championship Division B)
- France
- Greece
- Italy
- Netherlands
- Portugal ▲ (3rd place, 2012 FIBA Europe Women's Under-18 Championship Division B)
- Russia
- Serbia
- Slovakia
- Slovenia
- Spain
- Sweden
- Turkey

== First round ==
The first-round groups draw took place on 8 December 2012 in Freising, Germany. In the first round, the sixteen teams were allocated in four groups of four teams each. The top three teams of each group will qualify for the Second Round. The last team of each group will play in the Classification Group G first, then in the 9th–16th place playoffs.

Team advances to the Second Round
Team will compete in the Classification Group G

=== Group A ===
Team	Pld	W	L	PF	PA	PD	Pts
Netherlands	3	3	0	211	159	+52	6
Turkey	3	2	1	191	183	+8	5
Czech Republic	3	1	2	200	179	+21	4
Belarus	3	0	3	150	231	−81	3

15 August 2013
16:00

Report

Turkey	71–60	Czech Republic
Scoring by quarter: 18-12, 14-12, 15-24, 24-12
Pts: Bayraktar 16; Rebs: Senyürek 10; Asts: Akbas 5		Pts: Hoskova 18; Rebs: Mainclová 10; Asts: Moucková 4

EITŠID, Vinkovci
Referees: Sebastien Clivaz (SUI), Andrada Monika Csender (ROU), Kate Webb (ENG)

15 August 2013
18:15

Report

Belarus	59–71	Netherlands
Scoring by quarter: 18-19, 14-16, 18-17, 9-19
Pts: Kiuliak 15; Rebs: Kiuliak 13; Asts: Smarshko 3		Pts: Guijt 16; Rebs: Hof 9 Asts: Cornelius 8

EITŠID, Vinkovci
Referees: Jasmina Juras (SRB), Bojan Jovanic (BIH), Mario Majkic (SLO)

16 August 2013
13:45

Report

Czech Republic	81–36	Belarus
Scoring by quarter: 7-7, 21-10, 26-9, 27-10
Pts: Beránková 13; Rebs: Opocenska 8 Asts: Moucková 7		Pts: Kiuliak 9 Rebs: Kiuliak 15; Asts: Kiuliak 2

EITŠID, Vinkovci
Referees: Zdravko Rutesic (MNE), Florin Grigoras (ROU), Vasiliki Tsaroucha (GRE)

16 August 2013
16:00

Report

Netherlands	68–41	Turkey
Scoring by quarter: 19-4, 14-14, 17-8, 18-15
Pts: Guijt 17; Rebs: Slim 9 Asts: Cornelius 7		Pts: Senyürek 11; Rebs: Senyürek 7 Asts: 3 players tied with 2

EITŠID, Vinkovci
Referees: Pedro Coelho (POR), Ernad Karovic (BIH), Marek Kukelcik (SVK)

17 August 2013
13:45

Report

Turkey	79–55	Belarus
Scoring by quarter: 17-13, 14-18, 27-15, 21-9
Pts: Gülcan 17; Rebs: Altunbey 10; Asts: 3 players tied with 4		Pts: Inkina 11; Rebs: Kiuliak 10; Asts: Yermachkova 2

EITŠID, Vinkovci
Referees: Alfred Jovovic (CRO), Marek Kukelcik (SVK), Dariusz Zapolski (POL)

17 August 2013
16:00

Report

Netherlands	72–59	Czech Republic
Scoring by quarter: 12-18, 21-16, 23-17, 16-8
Pts: Cornelius 23; Rebs: Slim, Ndiba 9 Asts: 3 players tied with 2		Pts: Andelová 14; Rebs: Hoskova 5 Asts: Kopecká 5

EITŠID, Vinkovci
Referees: Maka Kupatadze (GEO), Ilya Putenko (RUS), Ernad Karovic (BIH)

=== Group B ===
Team	Pld	W	L	PF	PA	PD	Pts
Spain	3	3	0	243	143	+100	6
Russia	3	2	1	201	166	+35	5
Croatia	3	1	2	158	189	−31	4
England	3	0	3	133	237	−104	3

15 August 2013
13:45

Report

England	53–77	Russia
Scoring by quarter: 9-21, 11-25, 20-17, 13-14
Pts: Bravo-Harriott 17; Rebs: Adebayo 8 Asts: 3 players tied with 2		Pts: Shchetina 16; Rebs: Sema 10; Asts: Safonova 7

EITŠID, Vinkovci
Referees: Paulus Van Den Heuvel (NED), Erman Erdemli (TUR), Sok Hoon Lim (MAS)

15 August 2013
20:30

Report

Spain	80–48	Croatia
Scoring by quarter: 27-15, 13-11, 17-7, 23-15
Pts: Pujol 17; Rebs: Romero 7 Asts: Lizarazu 6		Pts: Butina 17; Rebs: Chiabov 6 Asts: Butina 5

EITŠID, Vinkovci
Referees: Maka Kupatadze (GEO), Dariusz Zapolski (POL), Stanislav Kucera (CZE)

16 August 2013
18:15

Report

Russia	62–71	Spain
Scoring by quarter: 16-13, 13-19, 11-17, 22-22
Pts: Kolosovskaia 20; Rebs: Fedorova, Shomodi 7 Asts: Levchenko 5		Pts: Romero, Pujol 19; Rebs: Pujol 10; Asts: Romero, Pujol 4

EITŠID, Vinkovci
Referees: Alfred Jovovic (CRO), Jasmina Juras (SRB), Andrada Monika Csender (ROU)

16 August 2013
20:30

Report

Croatia	68–47	England
Scoring by quarter: 21-7, 14-12, 12-9, 21-19
Pts: Perisa 16; Rebs: Perisa 10; Asts: Butina 5		Pts: Joseph 20; Rebs: Milligan 6 Asts: Joseph 4

EITŠID, Vinkovci
Referees: Sebastien Clivaz (SUI), Ilona Kucerova (CZE), Mario Majkic (SLO)

17 August 2013
18:15

Report

Spain	92–33	England
Scoring by quarter: 18-11, 23-12, 27-6, 24-4
Pts: Quevedo, Rodriguez 13; Rebs: Guri, Esparcia 7 Asts: 3 players tied with 5		Pts: Ottewill-Soulsby 11; Rebs: Joseph 12; Asts: McDerment 3

EITŠID, Vinkovci
Referees: Paulus Van Den Heuvel (NED), Pedro Coelho (POR), Sok Hoon Lim (MAS)

17 August 2013
20:30

Report

Russia	62–42	Croatia
Scoring by quarter: 14-9, 16-10, 15-7, 17-16
Pts: Komarova 12; Rebs: Sema 11; Asts: 3 players tied with 3		Pts: Chiabov 14; Rebs: Chiabov 11; Asts: Butina 5

EITŠID, Vinkovci
Referees: Florin Grigoras (ROU), Sebastien Clivaz (SUI), Vasiliki Tsaroucha (GRE)

=== Group C ===
Team	Pld	W	L	PF	PA	PD	Pts
Serbia	3	3	0	177	141	+36	6
Sweden	3	2	1	135	132	+3	5
Greece	3	1	2	160	157	+3	4
Portugal	3	0	3	122	164	−42	3

15 August 2013
13:45

Report

Greece	52–65	Serbia
Scoring by quarter: 20-12, 11-18, 13-22, 8-13
Pts: Stamolamprou 22; Rebs: Christinaki 7 Asts: 5 players tied with 1		Pts: Mandic 18; Rebs: Crvendakic 12; Asts: Mandic 7

Sports Hall Borovo, Vukovar
Referees: Carlos Peruga (ESP), Ilya Putenko (RUS), Marek Kukelcik (SVK)

15 August 2013
18:15

Report

Portugal	34–42	Sweden
Scoring by quarter: 9-14, 4-9, 10-4, 11-15
Pts: Soeiro 9 Rebs: Guimaraes, Kostourkova 7 Asts: Soeiro 7		Pts: Eriksson 16; Rebs: Lundqvist, Mirkovic 9 Asts: Hanson, Eriksson 3

Sports Hall Borovo, Vukovar
Referees: Alfred Jovovic (CRO), Ernad Karovic (BIH), Yury Ihnatsyeu (BLR)

16 August 2013
13:45

Report

Serbia	54–45	Portugal
Scoring by quarter: 12-13, 16-4, 5-18, 21-10
Pts: Crvendakic 22; Rebs: Crvendakic 16; Asts: 6 players tied with 1		Pts: Ferreira, Guimaraes 11; Rebs: Guimaraes 8 Asts: Soeiro 3

Sports Hall Borovo, Vukovar
Referees: Sebastien Clivaz (SUI), Ilya Putenko (RUS), Erman Erdemli (TUR)

16 August 2013
16:00

Report

Sweden	49–40	Greece
Scoring by quarter: 15-10, 11-11, 12-11, 11-8
Pts: Mirkovic 12; Rebs: Mirkovic 13; Asts: Eriksson 3		Pts: Stamolamprou 12; Rebs: Christinaki, Stamolamprou 6 Asts: Pavlopoulou 3

Sports Hall Borovo, Vukovar
Referees: Bojan Jovanic (BIH), Stanislav Kucera (CZE), Kate Webb (ENG)

17 August 2013
13:45

Report

Greece	68–43	Portugal
Scoring by quarter: 22-10, 23-2, 10-16, 13-15
Pts: Stamolamprou 18; Rebs: Karambatsa 7 Asts: Christinaki 2		Pts: Costa 13; Rebs: Filipe 13; Asts: Ferreira, Guimaraes 2

Sports Hall Borovo, Vukovar
Referees: Carlos Peruga (ESP), Stanislav Kucera (CZE), Mario Majkic (SLO)

17 August 2013
16:00

Report

Sweden	44–58	Serbia
Scoring by quarter: 4-9, 21-16, 10-20, 9-13
Pts: Paulsson, Kantzy 9 Rebs: Hanson 16; Asts: Hanson, Eriksson 2		Pts: Mandic 14; Rebs: Crvendakic 11; Asts: Crvendakic 10

Sports Hall Borovo, Vukovar
Referees: Zdravko Rutesic (MNE), Yury Ihnatsyeu (BLR), Ilona Kucerova (CZE)

=== Group D ===
Team	Pld	W	L	PF	PA	PD	Pts
France	3	3	0	191	131	+60	6
Italy	3	2	1	180	173	+7	5
Slovenia	3	1	2	170	170	0	4
Slovakia	3	0	3	112	179	−67	3

15 August 2013
16:00

Report

Slovenia	49–70	France
Scoring by quarter: 11-13, 11-23, 10-22, 17-12
Pts: Lisec 16; Rebs: Lisec 6 Asts: Zupancic 5		Pts: 3 players tied with 10; Rebs: Milapie 7 Asts: Elenga 4

Sports Hall Borovo, Vukovar
Referees: Ilona Kucerova (CZE), Pedro Coelho (POR), Florin Grigoras (ROU)

15 August 2013
20:30

Report

Italy	66–44	Slovakia
Scoring by quarter: 16-10, 12-12, 14-16, 24-6
Pts: Zandalasini 21; Rebs: Ercoli 11; Asts: Marangoni 5		Pts: Páleníková, Filickova 14; Rebs: Filickova 11; Asts: Dudásová, Urbaniova 2

Sports Hall Borovo, Vukovar
Referees: Zdravko Rutesic (MNE), Vasiliki Tsaroucha (GRE), Ilya Putenko (RUS)

16 August 2013
18:15

Report

Slovakia	41–63	Slovenia
Scoring by quarter: 13-20, 13-13, 10-14, 5-16
Pts: Dudásová 14; Rebs: Zarevúcka 9 Asts: Páleníková 3		Pts: Lisec 23; Rebs: Lisec 11; Asts: Zupancic 6

Sports Hall Borovo, Vukovar
Referees: Maka Kupatadze (GEO), Carlos Peruga (ESP), Sok Hoon Lim (MAS)

16 August 2013
20:30

Report

France	71–55	Italy
Scoring by quarter: 19-9, 21-10, 18-21, 13-15
Pts: Johannès 19; Rebs: Elenga 15; Asts: Johannès, Dambach 2		Pts: Gambarini 13; Rebs: Ercoli, Zandalasini 6 Asts: Marangoni 3

Sports Hall Borovo, Vukovar
Referees: [Paulus Van Den Heuvel (NED), Dariusz Zapolski (POL), Yury Ihnatsyeu (BLR)

17 August 2013
18:15

Report

Italy	59–58	Slovenia
Scoring by quarter: 16-11, 11-21, 14-15, 18-11
Pts: Zandalasini 11; Rebs: Penna 9 Asts: Zandalasini, Vespignani 2		Pts: Macura 15; Rebs: Lisec 15; Asts: Lisec 4

Sports Hall Borovo, Vukovar
Referees: Bojan Jovanic (BIH), Erman Erdemli (TUR), Andrada Monika Csender (ROU)

17 August 2013
20:30

Report

France	50–27	Slovakia
Scoring by quarter: 15-2, 13-10, 14-5, 8-10
Pts: Turmel 11; Rebs: Turmel 8 Asts: Johannès, Limousin 2		Pts: Páleníková 10; Rebs: Lavríková 6 Asts: 4 players tied with 1

Sports Hall Borovo, Vukovar
Referees: Jasmina Juras (SRB), Dragan Kralj (BIH), Kate Webb (ENG)

== Second round ==
Twelve advancing teams from the First Round will be allocated in two groups of six teams each. The top four teams of each group will advance to the quarterfinals. The last two teams of each group will play for the 9th–16th place against the teams from the Group G.

Team advances to Quarterfinals
Team will compete in 9th – 16th Place Playoff

=== Group E ===
Team	Pld	W	L	PF	PA	PD	Pts
Spain	5	5	0	367	241	+126	10
Russia	5	4	1	320	269	+51	9
Netherlands	5	3	2	293	264	+29	8
Turkey	5	2	3	269	330	−61	7
Czech Republic	5	1	4	284	321	−37	6
Croatia	5	0	5	222	330	−108	5

19 August 2013
16:00

Report

Russia	76–68	Turkey
Scoring by quarter: 21-19, 14-17, 17-17, 24-15
Pts: Kolosovskaia 16; Rebs: Sema 8 Asts: Safonova 4		Pts: Onar 19; Rebs: Senyürek 11; Asts: 3 players tied with 2

Sports Hall Borovo, Vukovar
Referees: Carlos Peruga (ESP), Bojan Jovanic (BIH), Mario Majkic (SLO)

19 August 2013
18:15

Report

Croatia	34–59	Netherlands
Scoring by quarter: 8-12, 5-7, 11-23, 10-17
Pts: Butina 10; Rebs: Chiabov 7 Asts: Racki, Pracuk 1		Pts: Guijt 15; Rebs: Slim 11; Asts: Slim 5

Sports Hall Borovo, Vukovar
Referees: Pedro Coelho (POR), Erman Erdemli (TUR), Kate Webb (ENG)

19 August 2013
20:30

Report

Czech Republic	45–71	Spain
Scoring by quarter: 11-23, 12-19, 10-13, 12-16
Pts: Beránková 10; Rebs: Mainclová, Kopecká 6 Asts: Krivánková 2		Pts: Rodriguez 12; Rebs: Pujol, Arrojo 7 Asts: Romero 3

Sports Hall Borovo, Vukovar
Referees: Zdravko Rutesic (MNE), Florin Grigoras (ROU), Yury Ihnatsyeu (BLR)

20 August 2013
16:00

Report

Turkey	32–75	Spain
Scoring by quarter: 7-16, 5-15, 11-17, 9-27
Pts: Cidal 11; Rebs: Cidal 5 Asts: 4 players tied with 1		Pts: Pujol 20; Rebs: Arrojo 9 Asts: Romero 5

Sports Hall Borovo, Vukovar
Referees: Jasmina Juras (SRB), Ernad Karovic (BIH), Stanislav Kucera (CZE)

20 August 2013
18:15

Report

Croatia	47–72	Czech Republic
Scoring by quarter: 12-11, 7-18, 22-20, 6-23
Pts: Butina 11; Rebs: Chiabov 10; Asts: Racki 3		Pts: Hoskova, Beránková 16; Rebs: Hoskova, Kraciková 10; Asts: Hoskova, Moucková 3

Sports Hall Borovo, Vukovar
Referees: Paulus Van Den Heuvel (NED), Andrada Monika Csender (ROU), Ilya Putenko (RUS)

20 August 2013
20:30

Report

Netherlands	40–60	Russia
Scoring by quarter: 13-19, 18-14, 4-9, 5-18
Pts: Hof 13; Rebs: Slim 13; Asts: Cornelius 2		Pts: Fedorova, Levchenko 11; Rebs: Shchetina, Shomodi 10; Asts: Sema, Levchenko 4

Sports Hall Borovo, Vukovar
Referees: Alfred Jovovic (CRO), Vasiliki Tsaroucha (GRE), Marek Kukelcik (SVK)

21 August 2013
16:00

Report

Russia	60–48	Czech Republic
Scoring by quarter: 17-10, 11-20, 12-15, 20-3
Pts: Fedorova 13; Rebs: Shchetina 9 Asts: Levchenko 8		Pts: Moucková 11; Rebs: Mainclová; Asts: Mainclová, Krivánková 2

Sports Hall Borovo, Vukovar
Referees: Dragan Kralj (BIH), Sebastien Clivaz (SUI), Sok Hoon Lim (MAS)

21 August 2013
18:15

Report

Turkey	57–51	Croatia
Scoring by quarter: 13-13, 14-11, 9-16, 21-11
Pts: Gülcan 12; Rebs: Senyürek 12; Asts: 3 players tied with 3		Pts: Butina 11; Rebs: Matijevic 10; Asts: Butina 3

Sports Hall Borovo, Vukovar
Referees: Pedro Coelho (POR), Florin Grigoras (ROU), Mario Majkic (SLO)

21 August 2013
20:30

Report

Spain	70–54	Netherlands
Scoring by quarter: 13-12, 19-19, 18-16, 20-7
Pts: Arrojo 19; Rebs: Quevedo 11; Asts: Arrojo, Romero 4		Pts: Hof 12; Rebs: 3 players tied with 7 Asts: Slim 3

Sports Hall Borovo, Vukovar
Referees: Zdravko Rutesic (MNE), Maka Kupatadze (GEO), Dariusz Zapolski (POL)

=== Group F ===
Team	Pld	W	L	PF	PA	PD	Pts
France	5	5	0	325	256	+69	10
Italy	5	4	1	302	288	+14	9
Serbia	5	3	2	306	269	+37	8
Sweden	5	2	3	231	260	−29	7
Slovenia	5	1	4	259	299	−40	6
Greece	5	0	5	252	303	−51	5

19 August 2013
16:00

Report

Italy	72–49	Sweden
Scoring by quarter: 19-16, 15-4, 21-12, 17-17
Pts: Botteghi 13; Rebs: Ercoli 12; Asts: Gambarini 4		Pts: Garderyd 12; Rebs: Mirkovic, Hanson 6 Asts: Eriksson, Hanson 3

EITŠID, Vinkovci
Referees: Dragan Kralj (BIH), Maka Kupatadze (GEO), Vasiliki Tsaroucha (GRE)

19 August 2013
18:15

Report

Greece	56–70	France
Scoring by quarter: 10-21, 12-12, 14-21, 20-16
Pts: Stamolamprou 18; Rebs: Christinaki 7 Asts: Fouraki 3		Pts: Johannès 17; Rebs: Mané 8 Asts: Morateur 4

EITŠID, Vinkovci
Referees: Alfred Jovovic (CRO), Stanislav Kucera (CZE), Sok Hoon Lim (MAS)

19 August 2013
20:30

Report

Slovenia	46–69	Serbia
Scoring by quarter: 10-12, 9-18, 14-25, 13-14
Pts: Kotar 13; Rebs: Vujacic, Senicar 6 Asts: Prezelj 3		Pts: Crvendakic 16; Rebs: Stankovic 12; Asts: Mandic 8

EITŠID, Vinkovci
Referees: Paulus Van Den Heuvel (NED), Marek Kukelcik (SVK), Ilya Putenko (RUS)

20 August 2013
16:00

Report

Sweden	44–51	France
Scoring by quarter: 9-16, 16-6, 5-14, 14-15
Pts: Eriksson 14; Rebs: Lundqvist 6 Asts: Agren 4		Pts: Djaldi-Tabdi 13; Rebs: Djaldi-Tabdi 11; Asts: Morateur 6

EITŠID, Vinkovci
Referees: Zdravko Rutesic (MNE), Bojan Jovanic (BIH), Ilona Kucerova (CZE)

20 August 2013
18:15

Report

Slovenia	67–56	Greece
Scoring by quarter: 19-16, 16-15, 13-10, 19-15
Pts: Lisec 16; Rebs: Lisec 14; Asts: Jelenc 7		Pts: Stamolamprou 15; Rebs: Christinaki, Pavlopoulou 7 Asts: Pavlopoulou 4

EITŠID, Vinkovci
Referees: Sebastien Clivaz (SUI), Kate Webb (ENG), Yury Ihnatsyeu (BLR)

20 August 2013
20:30

Report

Serbia	62–64	Italy
Scoring by quarter: 17-17, 15-11, 19-26, 11-10
Pts: Stankovic 22; Rebs: Stankovic 12; Asts: Mandic 6		Pts: Zandalasini 21; Rebs: Ercoli 10; Asts: Penna, Crudo 3

EITŠID, Vinkovci
Referees: Pedro Coelho (POR), Florin Grigoras (ROU), Dariusz Zapolski (POL)

21 August 2013
16:00

Report

Sweden	45–39	Slovenia
Scoring by quarter: 14-5, 10-13, 9-15, 12-6
Pts: Eriksson, Lundquist 13; Rebs: Hanson 10; Asts: Hanson 4		Pts: Macura, Lisec 11; Rebs: Macura, Lisec 15; Asts: Zupancic, Jelenc 5

EITŠID, Vinkovci
Referees: Jasmina Juras (SRB), Erman Erdemli (TUR), Marek Kukelcik (SVK)

21 August 2013
18:15

Report

Italy	52–48	Greece
Scoring by quarter: 9-20, 12-10, 15-7, 16-11
Pts: Crudo 13; Rebs: Crudo 10; Asts: Gambarini 3		Pts: Stamolamprou 21; Rebs: Karambatsa 9 Asts: Pavlopoulou 2

EITŠID, Vinkovci
Referees: Ilona Kucerova (CZE), Bojan Jovanic (BIH), Yury Ihnatsyeu (BLR)

21 August 2013
20:30

Report

France	63–52	Serbia
Scoring by quarter: 16-13, 18-9, 21-12, 8-18
Pts: Johannès 13; Rebs: Millavet 7 Asts: Mané 4		Pts: Vojinovic 13; Rebs: Piper, Stankovic 7 Asts: Spasojevic 5

EITŠID, Vinkovci
Referees: Carlos Peruga (ESP), Andrada Monika Csender (ROU), Kate Webb (ENG)

== Classification Group G ==
The last team of each group of the First Round will compete in this Classification Round.

Team	Pld	W	L	PF	PA	PD	Pts
Portugal	3	3	0	201	139	+62	6
England	3	2	1	159	182	−23	5
Slovakia	3	1	2	195	186	+9	4
Belarus	3	0	3	171	219	−48	3

19 August 2013
13:45

Report

Belarus	60–81	Slovakia
Scoring by quarter: 14-28, 17-15, 11-14, 18-24
Pts: Panasiuk, Kiuliak 11; Rebs: Kiuliak 13; Asts: Stsiapanava, Kiuliak 2		Pts: Hadacova 18; Rebs: Páleníková 9 Asts: Páleníková 4

Sports Hall Borovo, Vukovar
Referees: Sebastien Clivaz (SUI), Ernad Karovic (BIH), Dariusz Zapolski (POL)

19 August 2013
13:45

Report

England	31–65	Portugal
Scoring by quarter: 9-14, 5-8, 10-20, 7-23
Pts: Bravo-Harriott 10; Rebs: Szmidt 7 Asts: Ottewill-Soulsby 2		Pts: Filipe 16; Rebs: Costa 8 Asts: Soeiro 4

EITŠID, Vinkovci
Referees: Jasmina Juras (SRB), Andrada Monika Csender (ROU), Ilona Kucerova (CZE)

20 August 2013
13:45

Report

Portugal	67–45	Belarus
Scoring by quarter: 19-9, 19-12, 22-13, 7-11
Pts: Costa 12; Rebs: Guimaraes 8 Asts: Soeiro 5		Pts: Stsiapanava, Tsarevich 9 Rebs: Lapo 8 Asts: Stsiapanava, Sushchyk 2

EITŠID, Vinkovci
Referees: Dragan Kralj (BIH), Maka Kupatadze (GEO), Mario Majkic (SLO)

20 August 2013
13:45

Report

Slovakia	51–57	England
Scoring by quarter: 11-16, 18-15, 12-12, 10-14
Pts: Hadacova 12; Rebs: Páleníková 11; Asts: Dudásová 5		Pts: Bravo-Harriott 13; Rebs: Szmidt 11; Asts: Joseph, McDerment 2

Sports Hall Borovo, Vukovar
Referees: Carlos Peruga (ESP), Erman Erdemli (TUR), Sok Hoon Lim (MAS)

21 August 2013
13:45

Report

Belarus	66–71	England
Scoring by quarter: 14-10, 2-23, 27-18, 23-20
Pts: Kiuliak 24; Rebs: Kiuliak, Stsiapanava 7 Asts: Kiuliak 4		Pts: Lewis 15; Rebs: Ottewill-Soulsby 10; Asts: McDerment 4

EITŠID, Vinkovci
Referees: Paulus Van Den Heuvel (NED), Vasiliki Tsaroucha (GRE), Ernad Karovic (BIH)

21 August 2013
13:45

Report

Portugal	69–63 (OT)	Slovakia
Scoring by quarter: 10-11, 16-19, 10-11, 23-18, Overtime: 10-4
Pts: Ferreira 22; Rebs: Kostourkova 8 Asts: 3 players tied with 2		Pts: Filickova 18; Rebs: Filickova 12; Asts: Páleníková 4

Sports Hall Borovo, Vukovar
Referees: Alfred Jovovic (CRO), Stanislav Kucera (CZE), Ilya Putenko (RUS)

== 9th – 16th Place Playoff ==
23 August 2013
13:45

Report

Czech Republic	75–57	Belarus
Scoring by quarter: 18-19, 27-13, 15-11, 15-14
Pts: Beránková 14; Rebs: Kanuková 9 Asts: Krivánková, Moucková 4		Pts: Kiuliak 14; Rebs: Kiuliak 7 Asts: Kiuliak 3

EITŠID, Vinkovci
Referees: Dragan Kralj (BIH), Kate Webb (ENG), Sok Hoon Lim (MAS)

23 August 2013
16:00

Report

Greece	55–44	England
Scoring by quarter: 16-7, 10-8, 18-9, 11-20
Pts: Stamolamprou 17; Rebs: Karambatsa 8 Asts: Fouraki, Pavlopoulou 4		Pts: Joseph 13; Rebs: Joseph 10; Asts: Lewis 5

EITŠID, Vinkovci
Referees: Mario Majkic (SLO), Yury Ihnatsyeu (BLR), Ilya Putenko (RUS)

23 August 2013
18:15

Report

Slovenia	64–56	Slovakia
Scoring by quarter: 20-16, 19-11, 11-15, 14-14
Pts: Lisec 18; Rebs: Lisec 10; Asts: Zupančić, Jelenc 3		Pts: Páleníková 18; Rebs: Zarevúcka 18; Asts: Páleníková, Urbániová 4

EITŠID, Vinkovci
Referees: Zdravko Rutesić (MNE), Bojan Jovanić (BIH), Erman Erdemli (TUR)

23 August 2013
20:30

Report

Croatia	66–73 (OT)	Portugal
Scoring by quarter: 15-10, 18-23, 14-11, 15-18, Overtime: 4-11
Pts: Butina 30; Rebs: Matijevic 7 Asts: Ples 4		Pts: Pinheiro, Kostourkova 16; Rebs: Kostourkova 8 Asts: Soeiro 30

EITŠID, Vinkovci
Referees: Carlos Peruga (ESP), Andrada Monika Csender (ROU), Stanislav Kucera (CZE)

=== Classification games for 13th – 16th place ===
24 August 2013
13:45

Report

Slovakia	70–57	England
Scoring by quarter: 23-17, 8-12, 17-15, 22-13
Pts: Filickova 22; Rebs: Páleníková 10; Asts: Dudásová 7		Pts: Joseph 21; Rebs: Joseph 7 Asts: Bravo-Harriott, Lewis 3

EITŠID, Vinkovci
Referees: Sebastien Clivaz (SUI), Andrada Monika Csender (ROU), Yury Ihnatsyeu (BLR)

24 August 2013
16:00

Report

Belarus	59–73	Croatia
Scoring by quarter: 16-12, 17-19, 14-17, 12-25
Pts: Panasiuk 12; Rebs: Kiuliak 9 Asts: Tsarevich 3		Pts: Butina 28; Rebs: Matijević 12; Asts: Butina 6

EITŠID, Vinkovci
Referees: Paulus Van Den Heuvel (NED), Marek Kukelčík (SVK), Sok Hoon Lim (MAS)

=== Classification games for 9th – 12th place ===
24 August 2013
18:15

Report

Slovenia	52–59	Greece
Scoring by quarter: 16-11, 14-17, 20-13, 2-18
Pts: Lisec 10; Rebs: Lisec 12; Asts: Macura 4		Pts: Karambatsa 14; Rebs: Christinaki, Karambatsa 9 Asts: Pavlopoulou 4

EITŠID, Vinkovci
Referees: Zdravko Rutesić (MNE), Maka Kupatadze (GEO), Stanislav Kučera (CZE)

24 August 2013
20:30

Report

Czech Republic	67–70	Portugal
Scoring by quarter: 17-14, 15-17, 18-23, 17-16
Pts: Hoskova (21); Rebs: Hoskova 8 Asts: Andelová (3)		Pts: Pinheiro (16); Rebs: Kostourkova (12); Asts: Soeiro (8)

EITŠID, Vinkovci
Referees: Bojan Jovanić (BIH), Erman Erdemli (TUR), Ilya Putenko (RUS)

== 1st – 8th Place Playoff ==
Quarter-finals
23 August 2013 – 20:30
Spain	72
Sweden	32
23 August 2013 – 18:15
Italy	55
Netherlands	68
23 August 2013 – 16:00
France	73
Turkey	42
23 August 2013 – 13:45
Russia	62
Serbia	72

Semi-finals
24 August 2013 – 18:15
Spain	80
Netherlands	41
24 August 2013 – 20:30
France	62
Serbia	60

Final
25 August 2013 – 20:30
Spain	60
France	46
Third place
25 August 2013 – 18:15
Serbia	57
Netherlands	56

=== Quarterfinals ===
23 August 2013
13:45

Report

Russia	62–72	Serbia
Scoring by quarter: 17–18, 10–17, 15–18, 20–19
Pts: Kolosovskaia 19; Rebs: Shchetina 7 Asts: Levchenko 6		Pts: Crvendakić 21; Rebs: Crvendakić 15; Asts: Mandić, Crvendakić 6

Sports Hall Borovo, Vukovar
Referees: Paulus Van Den Heuvel (NED), Pedro Coelho (POR), Florin Grigoras (ROU)

23 August 2013
16:00

Report

France	73–42	Turkey
Scoring by quarter: 16–11, 18–10, 25–10, 14–11
Pts: Djaldi-Tabdi 24; Rebs: Elenga 10; Asts: Morateur 3		Pts: Gülcan 13; Rebs: Senyürek 7 Asts: Akbas 3

Sports Hall Borovo, Vukovar
Referees: Sebastien Clivaz (SUI), Ilona Kucerova (CZE), Dariusz Zapolski (POL)

23 August 2013
18:15

Report

Italy	55–68	Netherlands
Scoring by quarter: 13-12, 10-15, 12-21, 20-20
Pts: Crudo 14; Rebs: Zagni 6 Asts: Gambarini, Zandalasini 3		Pts: Cornelius 26; Rebs: Slim 12; Asts: Slim 5

Sports Hall Borovo, Vukovar
Referees: Jasmina Juras (SRB), Ernad Karovic (BIH), Marek Kukelcik (SVK)

23 August 2013
20:30

Report

Spain	72–32	Sweden
Scoring by quarter: 16-4, 23-8, 21-1, 12-19
Pts: Lo 15; Rebs: 4 players tied with 6 Asts: Rodriguez 4		Pts: Eriksson, Garderyd 5 Rebs: Hanson 6 Asts: Hanson 2

Sports Hall Borovo, Vukovar
Referees: Alfred Jovovic (CRO), Maka Kupatadze (GEO), Vasiliki Tsaroucha (GRE)

==== Classification games for 5th – 8th place ====
24 August 2013
13:45

Report

Turkey	41–63	Russia
Scoring by quarter: 11–10, 16–12, 8–26, 6–15
Pts: Altunbey 17; Rebs: Altunbey 9 Asts: Manlaci 3		Pts: Fedorova 21; Rebs: Fedorova 11; Asts: Levchenko 3

Sports Hall Borovo, Vukovar
Referees: Jasmina Juras (SRB), Dragan Kralj (BIH), Ernad Karovic (BIH)

24 August 2013
16:00

Report

Sweden	45–71	Italy
Scoring by quarter: 11–20, 15–20, 5–11, 14–20
Pts: Hanson 11; Rebs: Hanson, Lundqvist 6 Asts: Hanson 4		Pts: Ercoli, Zandalasini 12; Rebs: Zandalasini 11; Asts: Gambarini, Penna 4

Sports Hall Borovo, Vukovar
Referees: Carlos Peruga (ESP), Alfred Jovovic (CRO), Kate Webb (ENG)

=== Semifinals ===
24 August 2013
18:15

Report

France	62–60	Serbia
Scoring by quarter: 22-14, 11-19, 11-10, 18-17
Pts: Mané 15; Rebs: Djaldi-Tabdi 10; Asts: Morateur 3		Pts: Stanković 21; Rebs: Crvendakić 10; Asts: Mandić 7

Sports Hall Borovo, Vukovar
Referees: Florin Grigoras (ROU), Ilona Kučerová (CZE), Dariusz Zapolski (POL)

24 August 2013
20:30

Report

Spain	80–41	Netherlands
Scoring by quarter: 27-8, 15-12, 22-13, 16-8
Pts: Arrojo 17; Rebs: Guri 7 Asts: Pujol 4		Pts: Cornelius, Ndiba 9 Rebs: Zappeij 8 Asts: Guijt, Fokke 1

Sports Hall Borovo, Vukovar
Referees: Pedro Coelho (POR), Vasiliki Tsaroucha (GRE), Mario Majkič (SLO)

== Final classification games ==
=== Match for 15th place ===
25 August 2013
11:30

Report

Belarus	73–69	England
Scoring by quarter: 24-14, 13-14, 16-15, 20-26
Pts: Kiuliak 26; Rebs: Sushchyk 13; Asts: Kiuliak, Stsiapanava 5		Pts: Szmidt 16; Rebs: Szmidt 10; Asts: Bravo-Harriott 9

EITŠID, Vinkovci
Referees: Bojan Jovanic (BIH), Ernad Karovic (BIH), Ilya Putenko (RUS)

=== Match for 13th place ===
25 August 2013
13:45

Report

Croatia	52–47	Slovakia
Scoring by quarter: 12-14, 11-11, 14-13, 15-9
Pts: Butina 16; Rebs: Chiabov 11; Asts: Butina 5		Pts: Dudásová 18; Rebs: Hadacová, Filicková 8 Asts: Dudásová 5

EITŠID, Vinkovci
Referees: Mario Majkič (SLO), Pedro Coelho (POR), Florin Grigoras (ROU)

=== Match for 11th place ===
25 August 2013
16:00

Report

Czech Republic	74–52	Slovenia
Scoring by quarter: 24–16, 10–14, 16–12, 24–10
Pts: Opocenska 18; Rebs: Hoskova 11; Asts: Beránková 5		Pts: Lisec 18; Rebs: Macura 13; Asts: Macura, Jelenc 4

EITŠID, Vinkovci
Referees: Vasiliki Tsaroucha (GRE), Yury Ihnatsyeu (BLR), Sok Hoon Lim (MAS)

=== Match for 9th place ===
25 August 2013
18:15

Report

Portugal	69–56	Greece
Scoring by quarter: 11–25, 16–13, 23–10, 19–8
Pts: Leal Cortinhas 22; Rebs: Kostourkova 11; Asts: Guimaraes, Ferreira Lopes 4		Pts: Stamolamprou 29; Rebs: Christinaki 10; Asts: 3 players tied with 2

EITŠID, Vinkovci
Referees: Paulus Van Den Heuvel (NED), Ilya Putenko (RUS), Erman Erdemli (TUR)

=== Match for 7th place ===
25 August 2013
13:45

Report

Sweden	48–69	Turkey
Scoring by quarter: 10-15, 18-14, 13-19, 7-21
Pts: Kantzy 9 Rebs: Lundqvist 12; Asts: Hanson, Mirkovic 2		Pts: Cidal 18; Rebs: Altunbey 8 Asts: Onar 4

Sports Hall Borovo, Vukovar
Referees: Ilona Kučerová (CZE), Dragan Kralj (BIH), Dariusz Zapolski (POL)

=== Match for 5th place ===
25 August 2013
16:00

Report

Italy	56–65	Russia
Scoring by quarter: 15-12, 15-17, 14-21, 12-15
Pts: Zandalasini 14; Rebs: Penna 9 Asts: Gambarini 4		Pts: Fedorova 15; Rebs: Shchetina, Sema 8 Asts: 3 players tied with 2

Sports Hall Borovo, Vukovar
Referees: Zdravko Rutesić (MNE), Carlos Peruga (ESP), Kate Webb (ENG)

=== Bronze medal match ===
25 August 2013
18:15

Report

Netherlands	56–57	Serbia
Scoring by quarter: 17-16, 15-10, 13-19, 11-12
Pts: Cornelius 19; Rebs: Slim 11; Asts: Cornelius, Zappeij 3		Pts: Stanković 23; Rebs: Stanković 13; Asts: Crvendakić 4

Sports Hall Borovo, Vukovar
Referees: Maka Kupatadze (GEO), Stanislav Kučera (CZE), Marek Kukelčík (SVK)

=== Final ===
25 August 2013
20:30

Report

Spain	60–46	France
Scoring by quarter: 18-8, 14-22, 11-11, 17-5
Pts: Romero 22; Rebs: Arrojo 13; Asts: Romero 3		Pts: Morateur 17; Rebs: Millavet 11; Asts: 3 players tied with 1

Sports Hall Borovo, Vukovar
Attendance: 1500
Referees: Jasmina Juras (SRB), Alfred Jovovic (CRO), Andrada Monika Csender (ROU)

== Final standings ==
Rank	Team
1st place, gold medalist(s)	Spain
2nd place, silver medalist(s)	France
3rd place, bronze medalist(s)	Serbia
4th	Netherlands
5th	Russia
6th	Italy
7th	Turkey
8th	Sweden
9th	Portugal
10th	Greece
11th	Czech Republic
12th	Slovenia
13th	Croatia
14th	Slovakia
15th	Belarus
16th	England

2013 FIBA Europe Women's Under-18 Championship winners

Spain
4th title

Team relegated to 2014 Division B

=== All-Tournament Team ===
- (Spain) Leticia Romero MVP
- (Netherlands) Laura Cornelius
- (France) Marine Johannès
- (Serbia) Aleksandra Crvendakic
- (Serbia) Dragana Stankovic
