= 2015 FIBA Under-19 World Championship for Women =

Tournament details
- Host country: Russia
- Cities: Chekhov, Vidnoye
- Dates: 18–26 July
- Teams: 16 (from 5 confederations)
- Venue: 2 (in 2 host cities)

Final positions
- Champions: United States (7th title)

Tournament statistics
- MVP: (United States) A'ja Wilson
- Top scorer: (Spain) Salvadores (18.4)
- Top rebounds: (Argentina) Llorente (13.9)
- Top assists: (Netherlands) Cornelius (6.7)
- PPG (Team): United States (86.3)
- RPG (Team): United States (56.9)
- APG (Team): United States (20.1)

Official website
- www.fiba.basketball

The 2015 FIBA Under-19 World Championship for Women (Russian: Чемпионат мира по баскетболу 2015 среди девушек до 19 лет) was hosted by Russia from 18 to 26 July 2015.

The United States won their seventh title by defeating Russia 78–70 in the final.

== Venues ==
- Sports Palace Olympiskyi, Chekhov
- Vidnoye Sports Centre, Vidnoye

== Qualified teams ==
Means of qualification	Date	Venue	Berths	Qualified
Host nation			1	Russia
2014 FIBA Europe Under-18 Championship for Women	17 – 27 July 2014	Portugal	5	Belgium (5); France (2); Netherlands (6); Serbia (4); Spain (3)
2014 FIBA Americas Under-18 Championship for Women	6 – 10 August 2014	United States	4	Argentina; Brazil; Canada; United States
2014 FIBA Asia Under-18 Championship for Women	10 – 17 October 2014	Jordan	3	China (1); South Korea (3); Chinese Taipei* (4)
2014 FIBA Africa Under-18 Championship for Women	19 – 28 September 2014	Egypt	2	Egypt (2); Mali (1)
2014 FIBA Oceania Under-18 Championship for Women	1 – 6 December 2014	Fiji	1	Australia
Total			16	

(*) Japan qualified for the tournament but was suspended by FIBA. A third Asian team had to be named to take Japan's place. The draw took place with the third Asian team's identity yet to be named. On 23 March 2015, Chinese Taipei, fourth-place finisher at the Asia Championship, was confirmed by FIBA to be Japan's replacement.

== Preliminary round ==
The draw for the tournament was held on 12 March 2015 at the House of Basketball in Mies, Switzerland.

All times are local (UTC+3).

=== Group A ===
Pos	Team	Pld	W	L	PF	PA	PD	Pts
1	Russia	3	3	0	233	128	+105	6
2	Netherlands	3	2	1	206	210	−4	5
3	Chinese Taipei	3	1	2	177	225	−48	4
4	Argentina	3	0	3	159	212	−53	3

Source: FIBA.com

18 July 2015
18:00

Boxscore

Russia	89–43	Chinese Taipei
Scoring by quarter: 37–11, 17–10, 23–11, 12–11
Pts: Vadeeva 16; Rebs: Bratchikova 11; Asts: Kolosovskaya 5		Pts: Lo Pin 11; Rebs: Jhang You-jing, Su Yi-ching 7 Asts: Huang Jou-chen 5

Sports Palace Olympiskyi, Chekhov
Referees: Sérgio Silva (POR), Natalia Cuello Cuello (DOM), Robyn Manhire (AUS)

18 July 2015
19:45

Boxscore

Netherlands	79–65	Argentina
Scoring by quarter: 20–8, 18–23, 15–19, 26–15
Pts: Westerik 21; Rebs: Hof 11; Asts: Cornelius 8		Pts: Llorente 22; Rebs: Llorente 12; Asts: three players 3

Vidnoye Sports Centre, Vidnoye
Attendance: 100
Referees: Tiffany Bird (USA), Torkild Rodsand (NOR), Hortencia Sánchez (MEX)

19 July 2015
18:00

Boxscore

Argentina	38–73	Russia
Scoring by quarter: 9–17, 6–20, 16–23, 7–13
Pts: Llorente 15; Rebs: Llorente 9 Asts: Armesto 6		Pts: Kolosovskaya 15; Rebs: Musina 13; Asts: Sema 4

Sports Palace Olympiskyi, Chekhov
Attendance: 800
Referees: Maripier Malo (CAN), Torkild Rodsand (NOR), Radomir Vojinović (MNE)

19 July 2015
19:45

Boxscore

Chinese Taipei	74–80	Netherlands
Scoring by quarter: 23–15, 16–16, 16–28, 19–21
Pts: Lo Pin 20; Rebs: Jhang You-jing 9 Asts: Huang Jou-chen, Lo Pin 4		Pts: Hof 24; Rebs: Hof 16; Asts: Cornelius 9

Vidnoye Sports Centre, Vidnoye
Attendance: 80
Referees: Fernando Calatrava (ESP), Ricardo Hayles (JAM), Sarty Nghixulifwa (NAM)

21 July 2015
18:00

Boxscore

Netherlands	47–71	Russia
Scoring by quarter: 11–20, 12–12, 14–20, 10–19
Pts: Westerik 13; Rebs: Hof 7 Asts: Hof 5		Pts: Vadeeva 15; Rebs: Vadeeva 14; Asts: Musina, Levchenko 4

Sports Palace Olympiskyi, Chekhov
Attendance: 600
Referees: Tiffany Bird (USA), Bakr Al-Kuwari (QAT), Yener Yılmaz (TUR)

21 July 2015
18:00

Boxscore

Chinese Taipei	60–56	Argentina
Scoring by quarter: 11–14, 23–11, 12–21, 14–10
Pts: Hsu Yu-lien 16; Rebs: Hsu Yu-lien 11; Asts: Liu Hui-ju 8		Pts: Llorente 25; Rebs: Llorente 22; Asts: three players 2

Vidnoye Sports Centre, Vidnoye
Attendance: 120
Referees: Stanislav Kučera (CZE), Clemens Fritz (GER), Robyn Manhire (AUS)

=== Group B ===
Pos	Team	Pld	W	L	PF	PA	PD	Pts
1	United States	3	3	0	264	160	+104	6
2	China	3	2	1	201	211	−10	5
3	Spain	3	1	2	207	202	+5	4
4	Egypt	3	0	3	165	264	−99	3

Source: FIBA.com

18 July 2015
17:30

Boxscore

China	73–60	Egypt
Scoring by quarter: 19–16, 14–15, 22–12, 18–17
Pts: Xing Jinbo 21; Rebs: Dilana 10; Asts: five players 3		Pts: El-Gedawy 20; Rebs: Mamdouh 13; Asts: Abdelnabi, Amr 3

Vidnoye Sports Centre, Vidnoye
Attendance: 110
Referees: Leandro Lezcano (ARG), Bakr Al-Kuwari (QAT), Naftal Chongo (MOZ)

18 July 2015
20:15

Boxscore

Spain	57–72	United States
Scoring by quarter: 13–15, 11–21, 16–23, 17–13
Pts: Salvadores 9 Rebs: López 8 Asts: Flores 5		Pts: Wilson 18; Rebs: Collier 14; Asts: Collier 5

Sports Palace Olympiskyi, Chekhov
Attendance: 180
Referees: Jurgis Laurinavičius (LTU), Andrada Csender (ROU), Ioannis Foufis (GRE)

19 July 2015
17:30

Boxscore

Egypt	64–87	Spain
Scoring by quarter: 16–22, 24–14, 16–26, 8–25
Pts: El-Gedawy 26; Rebs: El-Gedawy 12; Asts: Abdelnabi 5		Pts: Salvadores 25; Rebs: Lo Sylla, Quevedo 7 Asts: four players 3

Vidnoye Sports Centre, Vidnoye
Attendance: 160
Referees: Christian Wilmore (BAH), Natalia Cuello Cuello (DOM), Alexey Davydov (RUS)

19 July 2015
20:15

Boxscore

United States	88–62	China
Scoring by quarter: 29–17, 26–12, 21–18, 12–15
Pts: Collier, Wilson 17; Rebs: Wilson 10; Asts: Moore 3		Pts: Xing Jinbo 14; Rebs: Xing Jinbo 5 Asts: Zhang Meiqi, Xing Jinbo 4

Sports Palace Olympiskyi, Chekhov
Attendance: 210
Referees: Yener Yılmaz (TUR), Bakr Al-Kuwari (QAT), Sérgio Silva (POR)

21 July 2015
20:15

Boxscore

China	66–63	Spain
Scoring by quarter: 20–19, 16–15, 17–14, 13–15
Pts: Sun Lirui 14; Rebs: Zhu Meiqi 7 Asts: three players 4		Pts: Salvadores 18; Rebs: Salvadores 6 Asts: Salvadores 5

Vidnoye Sports Centre, Vidnoye

21 July 2015
20:15

Boxscore

United States	104–41	Egypt
Scoring by quarter: 14–9, 38–9, 28–23, 24–0
Pts: Moore, Thomas 15; Rebs: Cox 17; Asts: Ortiz 6		Pts: El-Gedawy 14; Rebs: El-Gedawy 10; Asts: Abdelnabi 5

Sports Palace Olympiskyi, Chekhov
Attendance: 285

=== Group C ===
Pos	Team	Pld	W	L	PF	PA	PD	Pts
1	Belgium	3	3	0	191	153	+38	6
2	France	3	2	1	187	168	+19	5
3	Canada	3	1	2	177	187	−10	4
4	Mali	3	0	3	153	200	−47	3

Source: FIBA.com

18 July 2015
13:00

Boxscore

Belgium	64–60	France
Scoring by quarter: 12–7, 14–22, 19–4, 19–27
Pts: Ramette 17; Rebs: Allemand 10; Asts: Ramette 5		Pts: Majekodunmi 17; Rebs: Dambach 7 Asts: Majekodunmi 3

Sports Palace Olympiskyi, Chekhov
Attendance: 120
Referees: Fernando Calatrava (ESP), Arsen Andryushkin (KAZ), Clemens Fritz (GER)

18 July 2015
15:15

Boxscore

Canada	71–62	Mali
Scoring by quarter: 20–13, 17–18, 21–17, 13–14
Pts: Carleton 13; Rebs: Carleton 9 Asts: Atkinson 4		Pts: N'Diaye 14; Rebs: M. Coulibaly 11; Asts: Maiga 3

Vidnoye Sports Centre, Vidnoye
Attendance: 130
Referees: Stanislav Kučera (CZE), Ricardo Hayles (JAM), Wang Zebo (CHN)

19 July 2015
13:00

Boxscore

Mali	41–60	Belgium
Scoring by quarter: 11–9, 17–21, 11–11, 2–19
Pts: N'Diaye 9 Rebs: M. Coulibaly 10; Asts: M. Coulibaly, N'Diaye 2		Pts: Nauwelaers 13; Rebs: Allemand 12; Asts: Allemand 7

Vidnoye Sports Centre, Vidnoye
Attendance: 110
Referees: Leandro Lezcano (ARG), Arsen Andryushkin (KAZ), Robyn Manhire (AUS)

19 July 2015
15:45

Boxscore

France	58–54	Canada
Scoring by quarter: 17–13, 15–15, 14–7, 12–19
Pts: Dambach 17; Rebs: Mosongo 10; Asts: Majekodunmi 4		Pts: Yearwood 17; Rebs: Corbin 9 Asts: Carleton 4

Sports Palace Olympiskyi, Chekhov
Attendance: 160
Referees: Tiffany Bird (USA), Jurgis Laurinavičius (LTU), Wang Zebo (CHN)

21 July 2015
13:30

Boxscore

Canada	52–67	Belgium
Scoring by quarter: 18–15, 16–15, 7–16, 11–21
Pts: Carleton, Creighton 10; Rebs: Piggin 9 Asts: three players 2		Pts: Allemand 19; Rebs: Nauwelaers 8 Asts: Allemand 9

Vidnoye Sports Centre, Vidnoye
Attendance: 120
Referees: Fernando Calatrava (ESP), Andrada Csender (ROU), Christian Wilmore (BAH)

21 July 2015
13:30

Boxscore

France	69–50	Mali
Scoring by quarter: 17–7, 21–11, 20–17, 11–15
Pts: Limousin 14; Rebs: Cirgue 11; Asts: Combes 4		Pts: N'Diaye 19; Rebs: A. Coulibaly 7 Asts: four players 1

Sports Palace Olympiskyi, Chekhov
Attendance: 100
Referees: Natalia Cuello Cuello (DOM), Alexey Davydov (RUS), Torkild Rodsand (NOR)

=== Group D ===
Pos	Team	Pld	W	L	PF	PA	PD	Pts
1	Australia	3	3	0	254	148	+106	6
2	Serbia	3	2	1	216	246	−30	5
3	Brazil	3	1	2	205	193	+12	4
4	South Korea	3	0	3	155	243	−88	3

Source: FIBA.com

18 July 2015
13:00

Boxscore

South Korea	51–82	Brazil
Scoring by quarter: 10–22, 10–20, 11–18, 20–22
Pts: Park Ji-su 11; Rebs: Park Ji-su 6 Asts: Kim Hyeong-kyeong, Park Ji-su 2		Pts: Guimarães 19; Rebs: Araujo, Moura 8 Asts: three players 3

Vidnoye Sports Centre, Vidnoye
Attendance: 100
Referees: Radomir Vojinović (MNE), Alexey Davydov (RUS), Sarty Nghixulifwa (NAM)

18 July 2015
15:15

Boxscore

Australia	105–62	Serbia
Scoring by quarter: 22–13, 33–18, 24–9, 26–22
Pts: Smith 18; Rebs: Scherf 11; Asts: three players 4		Pts: Nogić 13; Rebs: Šubašic 8 Asts: three players 2

Sports Palace Olympiskyi, Chekhov
Attendance: 1,400
Referees: Yener Yılmaz (TUR), Maripier Malo (CAN), Christian Wilmore (BAH)

19 July 2015
13:30

Boxscore

Brazil	48–62	Australia
Scoring by quarter: 15–13, 13–10, 11–21, 9–18
Pts: Da Silva 11; Rebs: Araujo 8 Asts: Domingos 2		Pts: Scherf, Smith 12; Rebs: Maley 10; Asts: three players 2

Sports Palace Olympiskyi, Chekhov
Attendance: 120
Referees: Stanislav Kučera (CZE), Naftal Chongo (MOZ), Hortencia Sánchez (MEX)

19 July 2015
15:15

Boxscore

Serbia	74–66	South Korea
Scoring by quarter: 17–25, 14–5, 22–20, 21–16
Pts: Stevanović 18; Rebs: Katanić 11; Asts: Katanić 5		Pts: Park Ji-su 19; Rebs: Park Ji-su 14; Asts: Lee Ji-woo, Park Ji-su 5

Vidnoye Sports Centre, Vidnoye
Referees: Ioannis Foufis (GRE), Andrada Csender (ROU), Clemens Fritz (GER)

21 July 2015
15:45

Boxscore

South Korea	38–87	Australia
Scoring by quarter: 15–20, 4–13, 7–25, 12–29
Pts: Eom Da-yeong 7 Rebs: Park Ji-su 6 Asts: three players 2		Pts: Froling, Scherf 13; Rebs: Froling 8 Asts: Wallace 6

Sports Palace Olympiskyi, Chekhov
Referees: Jurgis Laurinavičius (LTU), Arsen Andryushkin (KAZ), Sarty Nghixulifwa (NAM)

21 July 2015
15:45

Boxscore

Serbia	80–75 (OT)	Brazil
Scoring by quarter: 12–22, 19–11, 19–15, 17–19, Overtime: 13–8
Pts: Vojinović 19; Rebs: Bogićević 15; Asts: Bogićević 5		Pts: Guimarães 24; Rebs: Guimarães 13; Asts: Benedicto 7

Vidnoye Sports Centre, Vidnoye
Attendance: 130
Referees: Ioannis Foufis (GRE), Ricardo Hayles (JAM), Wang Zebo (CHN)

== Knockout stage ==
=== Bracket ===
Round of 16
22 July
Russia	94
Egypt	37
22 July
France (OT)	76
Brazil	63
22 July
Chinese Taipei	63
China	89
22 July
Mali	23
Australia	91
22 July
Netherlands	68
Spain	73
22 July
Belgium	70
South Korea	37
22 July
Argentina	39
United States	89
22 July
Canada	58
Serbia	52

Quarter-finals
24 July
Russia	68
France	48
24 July
China	46
Australia	83
24 July
Spain	70
Belgium	66
24 July
United States	93
Canada	45

Semi-finals
25 July
Russia	76
Australia	57
25 July
Spain	65
United States	80

Final
26 July
Russia	70
United States	78
Third place
26 July
Australia	69
Spain	62

5–8th place bracket

5–8th place semifinals
25 July
France	67
China	61
25 July
Belgium	70
Canada	64

Fifth place
26 July
France	53
Belgium	40
Seventh place
26 July
China	67
Canada	47

9–16th place bracket

9–16th place quarterfinals
24 July
Egypt	66
Brazil	84
24 July
Chinese Taipei	59
Mali	77
24 July
Netherlands	72
South Korea	41
24 July
Argentina	59
Serbia	66

9–12th place semifinals
25 July
Brazil	60
Mali	49
25 July
Netherlands	90
Serbia	68

Ninth place
26 July
Brazil	72
Netherlands	83
Eleventh place
26 July
Mali	46
Serbia	58

13–16th place bracket

13–16th place semifinals
25 July
Egypt	59
Chinese Taipei	73
25 July
South Korea	63
Argentina	57

13th place
26 July
Chinese Taipei	67
South Korea	78
15th place
26 July
Egypt	43
Argentina	50

All times are local (UTC+3).

=== Round of 16 ===
22 July 2015
13:00

Boxscore

France	76–63 (OT)	Brazil
Scoring by quarter: 16–6, 20–20, 14–20, 10–14, Overtime: 16–3
Pts: Dambach 27; Rebs: Milapie 11; Asts: Dambach 8		Pts: Da Silva 15; Rebs: Guimarães 10; Asts: Benedicto 5

Vidnoye Sports Centre, Vidnoye
Attendance: 110
Referees: Ioannis Foufis (GRE), Tiffany Bird (USA), Sarty Nghixulifwa (NAM)

22 July 2015
13:30

Boxscore

Canada	58–52	Serbia
Scoring by quarter: 11–19, 10–9, 15–13, 22–11
Pts: Carleton 24; Rebs: Yearwood 16; Asts: Kirkpatrick 5		Pts: Arsenić, Nogić 9 Rebs: Nogić 7 Asts: Katanić 5

Sports Palace Olympiskyi, Chekhov
Attendance: 60
Referees: Yener Yılmaz (TUR), Robyn Manhire (AUS), Sérgio Silva (POR)

22 July 2015
15:15

Boxscore

Mali	23–91	Australia
Scoring by quarter: 12–23, 8–35, 1–18, 2–15
Pts: M. Coulibaly 13; Rebs: Traoré 6 Asts: Soumarè 3		Pts: Froling 19; Rebs: Smith 9 Asts: Wallace 7

Vidnoye Sports Centre, Vidnoye
Attendance: 120
Referees: Maripier Malo (CAN), Naftal Chongo (MOZ), Hortencia Sánchez (MEX)

22 July 2015
15:45

Boxscore

Belgium	70–37	South Korea
Scoring by quarter: 17–14, 25–6, 13–10, 15–7
Pts: Deviliegher 13; Rebs: Nauwelaers 8 Asts: Allemand 6		Pts: Jin An, Lee Ji-woo 8 Rebs: Kim Yeon-hee 8 Asts: Cha Ji-hyun, Jin An 2

Sports Palace Olympiskyi, Chekhov
Attendance: 120
Referees: Leandro Lezcano (ARG), Alexey Davydov (RUS), Radomir Vojinović (MNE)

22 July 2015
17:30

Boxscore

Argentina	39–89	United States
Scoring by quarter: 4–28, 14–20, 8–21, 13–20
Pts: Albuerne, Llorente 7 Rebs: Llorente, Mungo 7 Asts: three players 2		Pts: Wilson 18; Rebs: Collier, Patberg 9 Asts: Moore, Ortiz 6

Vidnoye Sports Centre, Vidnoye
Attendance: 150
Referees: Natalia Cuello Cuello (DOM), Arsen Andryushkin (KAZ), Andrada Csender (ROU)

22 July 2015
18:00

Boxscore

Russia	94–37	Egypt
Scoring by quarter: 23–14, 20–14, 21–3, 30–6
Pts: Vadeeva 23; Rebs: Vadeeva 21; Asts: Levchenko 5		Pts: El-Gedawy 16; Rebs: Mamdouh 7 Asts: three players 2

Sports Palace Olympiskyi, Chekhov
Attendance: 350
Referees: Stanislav Kučera (CZE), Clemens Fritz (GER), Wang Zebo (CHN)

22 July 2015
19:45

Boxscore

Netherlands	68–73	Spain
Scoring by quarter: 19–22, 15–14, 19–20, 15–17
Pts: Hof 18; Rebs: Westerik 8 Asts: Cornelius 8		Pts: Flores, Salvadores 18; Rebs: Orts 11; Asts: Flores 4

Vidnoye Sports Centre, Vidnoye
Attendance: 110
Referees: Jurgis Laurinavičius (LTU), Torkild Rodsand (NOR), Christian Wilmore (BAH)

22 July 2015
20:15

Boxscore

Chinese Taipei	63–89	China
Scoring by quarter: 15–13, 13–25, 15–30, 20–21
Pts: Huang Jou-chen 18; Rebs: Hsu Yu-lien 5 Asts: Liu Hui-ju, Huang Jou-chen 2		Pts: Zhu Meiqi 22; Rebs: Zhu Meiqi 10; Asts: Liu Shuai 7

Sports Palace Olympiskyi, Chekhov
Attendance: 20
Referees: Fernando Calatrava (ESP), Bakr Al-Kuwari (QAT), Ricardo Hayles (JAM)

=== 9–16th place quarterfinals ===
24 July 2015
11:45

Boxscore

Egypt	66–84	Brazil
Scoring by quarter: 19–22, 9–23, 20–23, 18–16
Pts: Mohamed 20; Rebs: four players 6 Asts: five players 2		Pts: Guimarães 16; Rebs: Guimarães 10; Asts: three players 4

Vidnoye Sports Centre, Vidnoye
Attendance: 80
Referees: Sérgio Silva (POR), Wang Zebo (CHN), Christian Wilmore (BAH)

24 July 2015
14:00

Boxscore

Netherlands	72–41	South Korea
Scoring by quarter: 21–10, 20–9, 16–11, 15–11
Pts: Hof, Westerik 17; Rebs: Hof 12; Asts: Cornelius 4		Pts: Jin An 12; Rebs: Jin An 10; Asts: Kim Hyeong-kyeong, Lee Ji-woo 4

Vidnoye Sports Centre, Vidnoye
Attendance: 80
Referees: Stanislav Kučera (CZE), Arsen Andryushkin (KAZ), Andrada Csender (ROU)

24 July 2015
16:15

Boxscore

Chinese Taipei	59–77	Mali
Scoring by quarter: 9–22, 17–17, 22–20, 11–18
Pts: Li Chia-chieh, Yu Yi-wen 11; Rebs: Su Yi-ching 10; Asts: Huang Jou-chen 7		Pts: N'Diaye 24; Rebs: Traoré 16; Asts: A. Keita 7

Vidnoye Sports Centre, Vidnoye
Attendance: 70
Referees: Robyn Manhire (AUS), Bakr Al-Kuwari (QAT), Alexey Davydov (RUS)

24 July 2015
18:30

Boxscore

Argentina	59–66	Serbia
Scoring by quarter: 10–9, 21–17, 12–17, 16–23
Pts: Llorente 18; Rebs: Llorente 16; Asts: Armesto 4		Pts: Bogićević 18; Rebs: Bogićević 12; Asts: Nogić 4

Vidnoye Sports Centre, Vidnoye
Attendance: 70
Referees: Jurgis Laurinavičius (LTU), Naftal Chongo (MOZ), Torkild Rodsand (NOR)

=== Quarterfinals ===
24 July 2015
13:30

Boxscore

China	46–83	Australia
Scoring by quarter: 13–25, 15–23, 11–15, 7–20
Pts: Liu Shuai 11; Rebs: Dilana, Xing Jinbo 7 Asts: Wang Miao 2		Pts: Smith 14; Rebs: Froling 12; Asts: Tupaea 5

Sports Palace Olympiskyi, Chekhov
Attendance: 130
Referees: Leandro Lezcano (ARG), Maripier Malo (CAN), Radomir Vojinović (MNE)

24 July 2015
15:45

Boxscore

Spain	70–66	Belgium
Scoring by quarter: 15–12, 23–22, 19–14, 13–18
Pts: Quevedo 23; Rebs: Quevedo 13; Asts: Salvadores 6		Pts: Allemand 17; Rebs: Geldof 12; Asts: Ramette 4

Sports Palace Olympiskyi, Chekhov
Attendance: 150
Referees: Yener Yılmaz (TUR), Natalia Cuello Cuello (DOM), Clemens Fritz (GER)

24 July 2015
18:00

Boxscore

Russia	68–48	France
Scoring by quarter: 18–13, 15–7, 23–12, 12–16
Pts: Musina 19; Rebs: Vadeeva 9 Asts: Levchenko 5		Pts: Combes 11; Rebs: Milapie 7 Asts: five players 1

Sports Palace Olympiskyi, Chekhov
Referees: Fernando Calatrava (ESP), Tiffany Bird (USA), Hortencia Sánchez (MEX)

24 July 2015
20:15

Boxscore

United States	93–45	Canada
Scoring by quarter: 28–5, 27–12, 19–10, 19–18
Pts: Collier, Moore 12; Rebs: Cox 10; Asts: Slocum 5		Pts: Piggin 8 Rebs: Gilles 5 Asts: three players 3

Sports Palace Olympiskyi, Chekhov
Referees: Ioannis Foufis (GRE), Ricardo Hayles (JAM), Sarty Nghixulifwa (NAM)

=== 13–16th place semifinals ===
25 July 2015
11:45

Boxscore

Egypt	59–73	Chinese Taipei
Scoring by quarter: 16–24, 15–15, 13–17, 15–17
Pts: Selaawi 22; Rebs: El-Gedawy 10; Asts: Amr 4		Pts: Hsu Yu-lien 15; Rebs: Jhang You-jing 10; Asts: Liu Hui-ju 8

Vidnoye Sports Centre, Vidnoye
Attendance: 70
Referees: Leandro Lezcano (ARG), Arsen Andryushkin (KAZ), Hortencia Sánchez (MEX)

25 July 2015
14:00

Boxscore

South Korea	63–57	Argentina
Scoring by quarter: 15–13, 15–7, 15–14, 18–23
Pts: Lee Ji-woo 16; Rebs: Park Ji-su 14; Asts: Lee Ju-yeon 6		Pts: Llorente 15; Rebs: Llorente 15; Asts: Albuerne 4

Vidnoye Sports Centre, Vidnoye
Attendance: 80
Referees: Clemens Fritz (GER), Bakr Al-Kuwari (QAT), Alexey Davydov (RUS)

=== 9–12th place semifinals ===
25 July 2015
16:15

Boxscore

Brazil	60–49	Mali
Scoring by quarter: 15–7, 16–7, 12–13, 17–22
Pts: Silva 11; Rebs: Guimarães, Moura 8 Asts: Moura 4		Pts: M. Coulibaly 19; Rebs: M. Coulibaly 18; Asts: M. Coulibaly 3

Vidnoye Sports Centre, Vidnoye
Attendance: 80
Referees: Yener Yılmaz (TUR), Andrada Csender (ROU), Wang Zebo (CHN)

25 July 2015
18:30

Boxscore

Netherlands	90–60	Serbia
Scoring by quarter: 29–18, 21–10, 24–13, 16–19
Pts: Hof 24; Rebs: Hof 9 Asts: Cornelius 6		Pts: Stevanović 12; Rebs: three players 6 Asts: Nogić 5

Vidnoye Sports Centre, Vidnoye
Attendance: 70
Referees: Fernando Calatrava (ESP), Tiffany Bird (USA), Sarty Nghixulifwa (NAM)

=== 5–8th place semifinals ===
25 July 2015
13:30

Boxscore

France	67–61	China
Scoring by quarter: 13–16, 19–6, 16–13, 19–16
Pts: Milapie 17; Rebs: Milapie 8 Asts: Dambach 4		Pts: Xing Jinbo 19; Rebs: Dilana 9 Asts: Xing Jinbo 5

Sports Palace Olympiskyi, Chekhov
Referees: Sérgio Silva (POR), Torkild Rodsand (NOR), Christian Wilmore (BAH)

25 July 2015
15:45

Boxscore

Belgium	70–64	Canada
Scoring by quarter: 16–18, 22–14, 13–12, 19–20
Pts: Allemand 24; Rebs: Geldof 9 Asts: Allemand 4		Pts: Carleton 20; Rebs: Yearwood 13; Asts: Yearwood 5

Sports Palace Olympiskyi, Chekhov
Attendance: 250
Referees: Stanislav Kučera (CZE), Naftal Chongo (MOZ), Robyn Manhire (AUS)

=== Semifinals ===
25 July 2015
18:00

Boxscore

Russia	76–57	Australia
Scoring by quarter: 18–13, 21–12, 20–19, 17–13
Pts: Vadeeva 27; Rebs: Vadeeva 16; Asts: Levchenko 7		Pts: Wallace 15; Rebs: Sharp, Wallace 8 Asts: Tupaea 3

Sports Palace Olympiskyi, Chekhov
Attendance: 1,500
Referees: Maripier Malo (CAN), Ioannis Foufis (GRE), Ricardo Hayles (JAM)

25 July 2015
20:15

Boxscore

Spain	65–80	United States
Scoring by quarter: 19–21, 12–23, 19–18, 15–18
Pts: Quevedo 17; Rebs: Lo Sylla, Salvadores 8 Asts: Salvadores 6		Pts: Collier 24; Rebs: Collier 14; Asts: Moore 4

Sports Palace Olympiskyi, Chekhov
Attendance: 250
Referees: Jurgis Laurinavičius (LTU), Natalia Cuello Cuello (DOM), Radomir Vojinović (MNE)

=== Final classification games ===
==== Match for 15th place ====
26 July 2015
10:00

Boxscore

Egypt	43–50	Argentina
Scoring by quarter: 6–10, 12–14, 15–14, 10–23
Pts: Selaawi 17; Rebs: El-Gedawy 9 Asts: Maged, Talaat 2		Pts: Llorente 14; Rebs: Llorente 16; Asts: Albuerne 4

Vidnoye Sports Centre, Vidnoye
Attendance: 70
Referees: Ricardo Hayles (JAM), Naftal Chongo (MOZ), Sérgio Silva (POR)

==== Match for 13th place ====
26 July 2015
12:15

Boxscore

Chinese Taipei	67–78	South Korea
Scoring by quarter: 13–15, 19–23, 23–20, 12–20
Pts: Hsu Yu-lien 18; Rebs: Hsu Yu-lien 6 Asts: Liu Hui-ju 5		Pts: Lee Ji-woo 21; Rebs: Park Ji-su 11; Asts: three players 3

Vidnoye Sports Centre, Vidnoye
Attendance: 70
Referees: Ioannis Foufis (GRE), Bakr Al-Kuwari (QAT), Sergey Mikhaylov (RUS)

==== Match for 11th place ====
26 July 2015
13:30

Boxscore

Mali	46–58	Serbia
Scoring by quarter: 11–17, 6–16, 13–12, 16–13
Pts: Dakouo 19; Rebs: Traoré 14; Asts: A. Keita 2		Pts: Nogić 13; Rebs: three players 7 Asts: Bogićević 4

Sports Palace Olympiskyi, Chekhov
Referees: Stanislav Kučera (CZE), Torkild Rodsand (NOR), Hortencia Sánchez (MEX)

==== Match for 9th place ====
26 July 2015
14:30

Boxscore

Brazil	72–83	Netherlands
Scoring by quarter: 11–26, 16–21, 15–23, 30–13
Pts: Moura 16; Rebs: Araujo, Silva 7 Asts: Silva 3		Pts: Hof 23; Rebs: three players 8 Asts: Cornelius 8

Vidnoye Sports Centre, Vidnoye
Referees: Yener Yılmaz (TUR), Wang Zebo (CHN), Christian Wilmore (BAH)

==== Match for 7th place ====
26 July 2015
15:45

Boxscore

China	67–47	Canada
Scoring by quarter: 25–12, 17–7, 15–16, 10–12
Pts: Xing Jinbo 15; Rebs: Zhu Meiqi 15; Asts: Xing Jinbo 7		Pts: Carleton 12; Rebs: Yearwood 8 Asts: Carleton, Yearwood 3

Sports Palace Olympiskyi, Chekhov
Referees: Clemens Fritz (GER), Andrada Csender (ROU), Alexey Davydov (RUS)

==== Match for 5th place ====
26 July 2015
16:45

Boxscore

France	53–40	Belgium
Scoring by quarter: 8–10, 10–8, 11–6, 24–16
Pts: Majekodunmi 17; Rebs: Milapie 7 Asts: Majekodunmi 3		Pts: Ramette, Ouahabi 11; Rebs: Ramette 7 Asts: five players 1

Vidnoye Sports Centre, Vidnoye
Attendance: 150
Referees: Jurgis Laurinavičius (LTU), Arsen Andryushkin (KAZ), Radomir Vojinović (MNE)

==== Bronze medal match ====
26 July 2015
18:00

Boxscore

Australia	69–62	Spain
Scoring by quarter: 29–13, 14–20, 14–15, 12–14
Pts: Smith 20; Rebs: Smith 15; Asts: Tupaea 4		Pts: Salvadores 22; Rebs: López 9 Asts: Salvadores 4

Sports Palace Olympiskyi, Chekhov
Attendance: 2,000
Referees: Maripier Malo (CAN), Tiffany Bird (USA), Sarty Nghixulifwa (NAM)

==== Final ====
26 July 2015
20:15

Boxscore

Russia	70–78	United States
Scoring by quarter: 21–19, 13–20, 19–18, 17–21
Pts: Kolosovskaya 19; Rebs: Vadeeva 13; Asts: Levchenko 10		Pts: Wilson 30; Rebs: Collier 10; Asts: Dangerfield 5

Sports Palace Olympiskyi, Chekhov
Attendance: 2,800
Referees: Fernando Calatrava (ESP), Natalia Cuello Cuello (DOM), Leandro Lezcano (ARG),

== Final standings ==
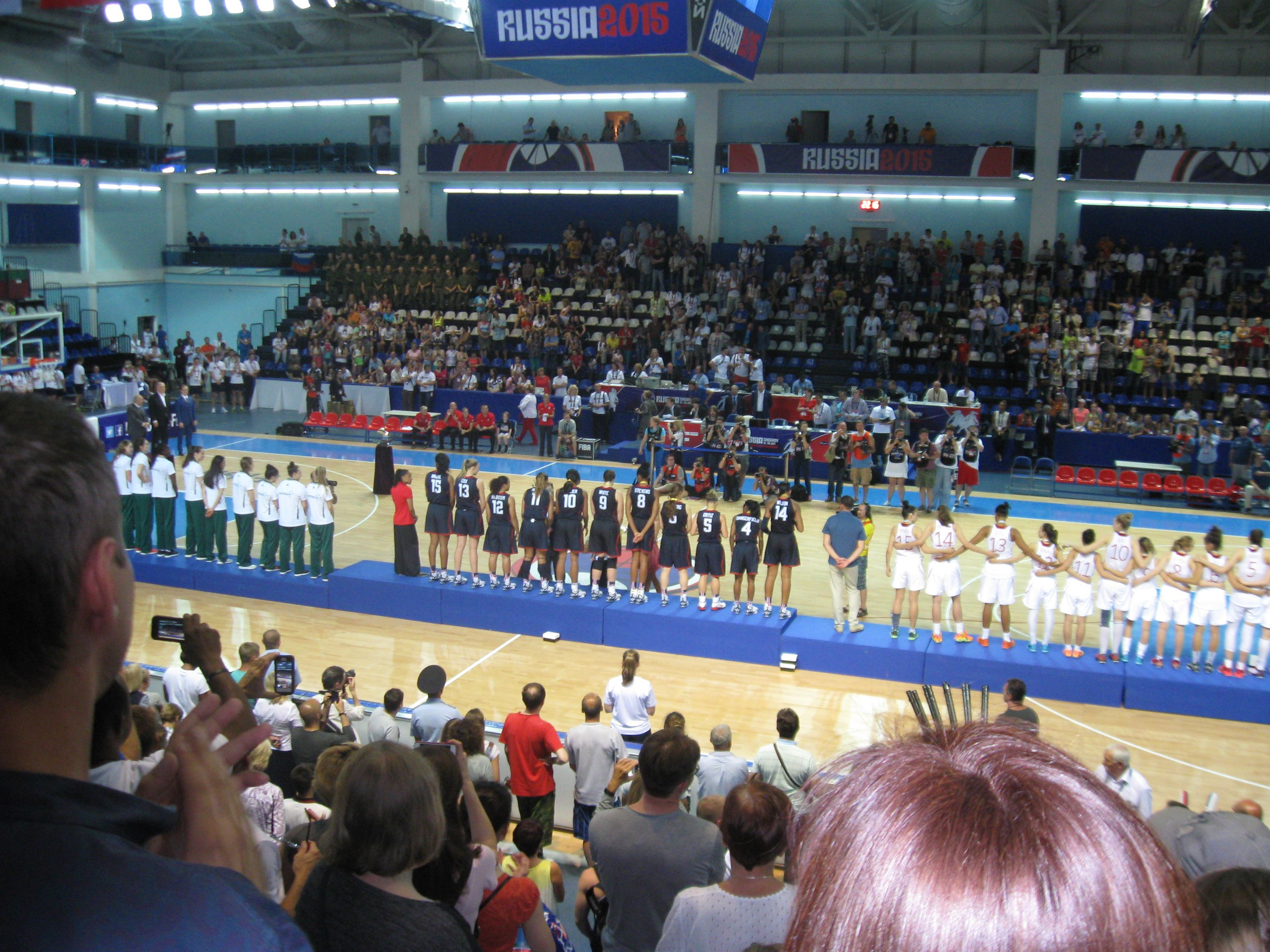

Rank	Team
1st place, gold medalist(s) Gold	United States
2nd place, silver medalist(s) Silver	Russia
3rd place, bronze medalist(s) Bronze	Australia
4th	Spain
5th	France
6th	Belgium
7th	China
8th	Canada
9th	Netherlands
10th	Brazil
11th	Serbia
12th	Mali
13th	South Korea
14th	Chinese Taipei
15th	Argentina
16th	Egypt

== Statistics and awards ==
=== Statistical leaders ===
Points

Name	PPG
(Spain) Ángela Salvadores	18.4
(United States) A'ja Wilson	18.3
(Egypt) Raneem El-Gedawy	18.0
(Netherlands) Emese Hof	16.9
(Russia) Maria Vadeeva	16.9

Rebounds

Name	RPG
(Argentina) Victoria Llorente	13.9
(Russia) Maria Vadeeva	12.3
(South Korea) Park Ji-su	10.2
(Mali) Mariam Coulibaly	10.0
(Netherlands) Emese Hof	10.0

Assists

Name	APG
(Netherlands) Laura Cornelius	6.7
(Belgium) Julie Allemand	4.7
(Russia) Kseniia Levchenko	4.4
(Spain) Ángela Salvadores	4.3
(Chinese Taipei) Huang Jou-chen	4.0

Blocks

Name	BPG
(South Korea) Park Ji-su	4.0
(Russia) Maria Vadeeva	3.7
(Belgium) Serena-Lynn Geldof	2.7
(Australia) Alanna Smith	2.7
(Netherlands) Emese Hof	2.1

Steals

Name	SPG
(Brazil) Thayna Silva	3.3
(Mali) Djenaba N'Diaye	3.0
(Netherlands) Fleur Kuijt	2.8
(Russia) Kseniia Levchenko	2.7
(Egypt) Nadine Selaawi	2.6

=== Awards ===
2015 Under-19 World Championship winner

United States
Seventh title

Most Valuable Player
(United States) A'ja Wilson

All-Tournament Team

- (United States) A'ja Wilson
- (United States) Napheesa Collier
- (Russia) Maria Vadeeva
- (Russia) Daria Kolosovskaya
- (Australia) Alanna Smith
