= Basketball at the 2019 Summer Universiade – Women's tournament =

Women's basketball at the XXX Summer Universiade
- Venue: various
- Dates: 3–11 July
- Teams: 16

Medalists
1st place, gold medalist(s)		Australia (3rd title)
2nd place, silver medalist(s)		United States
3rd place, bronze medalist(s)		Portugal

The women's tournament in basketball at the 2019 Summer Universiade in Naples, Italy was held from 3 to 11 July 2019.

== Teams ==
Americas	Asia	Europe	Oceania
Argentina; Canada; Mexico; United States	China; Chinese Taipei; Japan	Czech Republic; Finland; Hungary; Portugal; Romania; Russia; Slovakia; Ukraine	Australia

== Preliminary round ==
Qualified for the Final eight
Qualified for the Placement 9th-16th

=== Pool A ===
Team	Pld	W	L	PF	PA	PD	Pts
Japan	3	3	0	228	167	+61	6
Czech Republic	3	2	1	192	183	+9	5
Hungary	3	1	2	171	176	−5	4
Ukraine	3	0	3	132	197	−65	3

3 July 2019
10:30 UTC+2

Boxscore

Ukraine	48–63	Japan

Palasport Del Mauro

3 July 2019
13:00 UTC+2

Boxscore

Czech Republic	56–54	Hungary

Palasport Del Mauro

4 July 2019
13:00 UTC+2

Boxscore

Ukraine	36–71	Czech Republic

PalaBarbuto

4 July 2019
17:30 UTC+2

Boxscore

Japan	72–54	Hungary

PalaBarbuto

5 July 2019
10:30 UTC+2

Boxscore

Hungary	63–48	Ukraine

PalaJacazzi

5 July 2019
17:30 UTC+2

Boxscore

Czech Republic	65–93	Japan

PalaJacazzi

=== Pool B ===
Team	Pld	W	L	PF	PA	PD	Pts
Portugal	3	3	0	208	136	+72	6
Russia	3	2	1	183	162	+21	5
Romania	3	1	2	116	165	−49	4
Argentina	3	0	3	143	187	−44	3

3 July 2019
10:30 UTC+2

Boxscore

Portugal	64–50	Argentina

PalaBarbuto

3 July 2019
13:00 UTC+2

Boxscore

Romania	31–59	Russia
Scoring by quarter: 10–16, 4–20, 12–8, 5–15
Pts: Podar 10; Rebs: Virjoghe 8 Asts: Ferariu 2		Pts: Kolosovskaya 19; Rebs: Fedorova 13; Asts: Burovaya 4

PalaBarbuto
Referees: Grant Todey (USA), Valerio Grigioni (ITA), Gatis Saliņš (LAT)

4 July 2019
13:00 UTC+2

Boxscore

Portugal	69–32	Romania

PalaJacazzi

4 July 2019
20:00 UTC+2

Boxscore

Argentina	56–70	Russia
Scoring by quarter: 16–19, 15–12, 16–25, 9–14
Pts: Pag 15; Rebs: Pag 6 Asts: Barzola, Sancisi 1		Pts: Kolosovskaya 19; Rebs: Fedorova, Sazonova 10; Asts: Burovaya 3

PalaJacazzi
Referees: Ge Qian (CHN), Gatis Saliņš (LAT), Veronika Vávrová (CZE)

5 July 2019
13:00 UTC+2

Boxscore

Russia	54–75	Portugal
Scoring by quarter: 18–29, 15–17, 12–20, 9–9
Pts: Kolosovskaya 14; Rebs: Kazakova 8 Asts: three players 2		Pts: Ferreira 30; Rebs: Ferreira 9 Asts: Viana 4

PalaCercola
Referees: Pualani Spurlock-Welsh (USA), Alberto Achutegui (MEX), Nikola Bejat (NOR)

5 July 2019
17:30 UTC+2

Boxscore

Romania	53–37	Argentina

PalaCercola

=== Pool C ===
Team	Pld	W	L	PF	PA	PD	Pts
United States	3	3	0	245	186	+59	6
Chinese Taipei	3	2	1	236	202	+34	5
Slovakia	3	1	2	160	215	−55	4
Mexico	3	0	3	152	190	−38	3

3 July 2019
10:30 UTC+2

Boxscore

United States	60–49	Mexico

PalaJacazzi

3 July 2019
13:00 UTC+2

Boxscore

Chinese Taipei	75–54	Slovakia

PalaJacazzi

4 July 2019
13:00 UTC+2

Boxscore

United States	93–85	Chinese Taipei

PalaCercola

4 July 2019
17:30 UTC+2

Boxscore

Mexico	48–54	Slovakia

PalaCercola

5 July 2019
10:30 UTC+2

Boxscore

Chinese Taipei	76–55	Mexico

Palasport Del Mauro

5 July 2019
17:30 UTC+2

Boxscore

Slovakia	52–92	United States

Palasport Del Mauro

=== Pool D ===
Team	Pld	W	L	PF	PA	PD	Pts
Australia	3	3	0	243	186	+57	6
China	3	2	1	243	209	+34	5
Finland	3	1	2	183	202	−19	4
Canada	3	0	3	179	251	−72	3

3 July 2019
10:30 UTC+2

Boxscore

China	84–69	Canada

PalaCercola

3 July 2019
13:00 UTC+2

Boxscore

Finland	51–68	Australia

PalaCercola

4 July 2019
13:00 UTC+2

Boxscore

China	75–50	Finland

Palasport Del Mauro

4 July 2019
17:30 UTC+2

Boxscore

Canada	51–85	Australia

Palasport Del Mauro

5 July 2019
10:30 UTC+2

Boxscore

Australia	90–84	China

PalaBarbuto

5 July 2019
17:30 UTC+2

Boxscore

Finland	82–59	Canada

PalaBarbuto

== 9th to 16th place classification ==
=== Bracket ===
13th place
Canada	67
Mexico	54
15th place
Argentina	52
Ukraine	46

13–16th place semifinals
Argentina	36
Canada	75
Ukraine	54
Mexico	63

9–16th place quarterfinals
A3	Hungary	76
B4	Argentina	62
C3	Slovakia	54
D4	Canada	53
B3	Romania (OT)	76
A4	Ukraine	72
D3	Finland	77
C4	Mexico	51

9–12th place semifinals
Hungary	70
Slovakia	50
Romania	50
Finland	73

9th place
Hungary	44
Finland	75
11th place
Slovakia	46
Romania	61

=== 9–16th place quarterfinals ===
7 July 2019
17:30 UTC+2

Boxscore

Hungary	76–62	Argentina

PalaBarbuto

7 July 2019
17:30 UTC+2

Boxscore

Slovakia	54–53	Canada

PalaCercola

7 July 2019
17:30 UTC+2

Boxscore

Romania	76–72	Ukraine

PalaJacazzi

7 July 2019
17:30 UTC+2

Boxscore

Finland	77–51	Mexico

Palasport Del Mauro

=== 13–16th place semifinals ===
8 July 2019
13:00 UTC+2

Boxscore

Argentina	36–75	Canada

PalaBarbuto

8 July 2019
13:00 UTC+2

Boxscore

Ukraine	54–63	Mexico

PalaJacazzi

=== 9–12th place semifinals ===
8 July 2019
13:00 UTC+2

Boxscore

Hungary	70–50	Slovakia

Palasport Del Mauro

8 July 2019
13:00 UTC+2

Boxscore

Romania	50–73	Finland

PalaCercola

=== 15th place game ===
10 July 2019
13:00 UTC+2

Boxscore

Argentina	52–46	Ukraine

PalaJacazzi

=== 13th place game ===
10 July 2019
13:00 UTC+2

Boxscore

Canada	67–54	Mexico

ParaCercola

=== 11th place game ===
10 July 2019
10:30 UTC+2

Boxscore

Slovakia	46–61	Romania

ParaCercola

=== 9th place game ===
10 July 2019
10:30 UTC+2

Boxscore

Hungary	44–75	Finland

ParaJacazzi

== 1st to 8th place classification ==
=== Bracket ===
5th place
Russia	74
Chinese Taipei	58
7th place
China	69
Czech Republic	77

5–8th place semifinals
Russia	73
China	64
Czech Republic	57
Chinese Taipei	83

Quarterfinals
A1	Japan	89
B2	Russia	83
C1	United States	87
D2	China	79
B1	Portugal	60
A2	Czech Republic	44
D1	Australia	81
C2	Chinese Taipei	72

Semifinals
Japan	84
United States	89
Portugal	49
Australia	56

Gold medal match
United States	72
Australia	80
Bronze medal match
Japan	59
Portugal (OT)	76

=== Quarterfinals ===
7 July 2019
20:00 UTC+2

Boxscore

Japan	89–83	Russia
Scoring by quarter: 22–23, 16–19, 31–19, 20–22
Pts: Nakada 17; Rebs: Fujimoto 6 Asts: Takada 7		Pts: Matushkina 28; Rebs: Fedorova 6 Asts: Burovaya 8

Palasport Del Mauro
Referees: Leonardo Zalazar (ARG), Mora Gaytán (MEX), Péter Praksch (HUN)

7 July 2019
20:00 UTC+2

Boxscore

United States	87–79	China

PalaJacazzi

7 July 2019
20:00 UTC+2

Boxscore

Portugal	60–44	Czech Republic

PalaBarbuto

7 July 2019
20:00 UTC+2

Boxscore

Australia	81–72	Chinese Taipei

PalaCercola

=== 5–8th place semifinals ===
8 July 2019
17:30 UTC+2

Boxscore

Russia	73–64	China
Scoring by quarter: 21–16, 18–14, 17–15, 17–19
Pts: Burovaya 16; Rebs: Fedorova, Kazakova 8 Asts: Fedorova 3		Pts: Ma 17; Rebs: Zhou 7 Asts: Song 3

PalaJacazzi
Referees: Pualani Spurlock-Welsh (USA), Christine Vuong (CAN), Ryoko Odanaka (JPN)

8 July 2019
20:00 UTC+2

Boxscore

Czech Republic	57–83	Chinese Taipei

PalaJacazzi

=== Semifinals ===
8 July 2019
17:30 UTC+2

Boxscore

Japan	84–89	United States

PalaBarbuto

8 July 2019
20:00 UTC+2

Boxscore

Portugal	49–56	Australia

PalaBarbuto

=== 7th place game ===
10 July 2019
13:00 UTC+2

Boxscore

China	69–77	Czech Republic

Palasport Del Mauro

=== 5th place game ===
10 July 2019
10:30 UTC+2

Boxscore

Russia	74–58	Chinese Taipei
Scoring by quarter: 20–16, 18–13, 13–18, 23–11
Pts: Fedorova 20; Rebs: Fedorova 17; Asts: Burovaya 6		Pts: Chen W. 20; Rebs: Hsu 7 Asts: four players 3

Palasport Del Mauro
Referees: Alexandra Stan (ROU), Paulo Marques (POR), Nikola Bejat (NOR)

=== Bronze medal game ===
10 July 2019
17:30 UTC+2

Boxscore

Japan	59–76 (OT)	Portugal (bronze)
Scoring by quarter: 17–13, 12–19, 19–11, 10–15, Overtime: 1–18
Pts: Matsumoto 13; Rebs: Nakada 8 Asts: Takada 11		Pts: Ferreira 21; Rebs: Kostourkova 14; Asts: Ferreira 8

PalaBarbuto
Attendance: Pualani Spurlock-Welsh (USA), Micaela Prado (ARG), Zhang X. (CHN)

=== Gold medal game ===
10 July 2019
20:00 UTC+2

Boxscore

(silver) United States	72–80	Australia (gold)
Scoring by quarter: 15–23, 19–14, 14–29, 24–14
Pts: Jackson 18; Rebs: Morris 11; Asts: Holmes 6		Pts: Wehrung 21; Rebs: Magbegor 10; Asts: Wehrung 11

PalaBarbuto
Referees: Ryoko Odanaka (JPN), Christine Vuong (CAN), Alexey Davydov (RUS)

== Final standings ==
Place	Team	Record
1st place, gold medalist(s)	Australia	6–0
2nd place, silver medalist(s)	United States	5–1
3rd place, bronze medalist(s)	Portugal	5–1
4	Japan	4–2
5	Russia	4–2
6	Chinese Taipei	3–3
7	Czech Republic	3–3
8	China	2–4
9	Finland	4–2
10	Hungary	3–3
11	Romania	3–3
12	Slovakia	2–4
13	Canada	2–4
14	Mexico	1–5
15	Argentina	1–5
16	Ukraine	0–6
