= Daria Kolosovskaya =

Russian basketball player

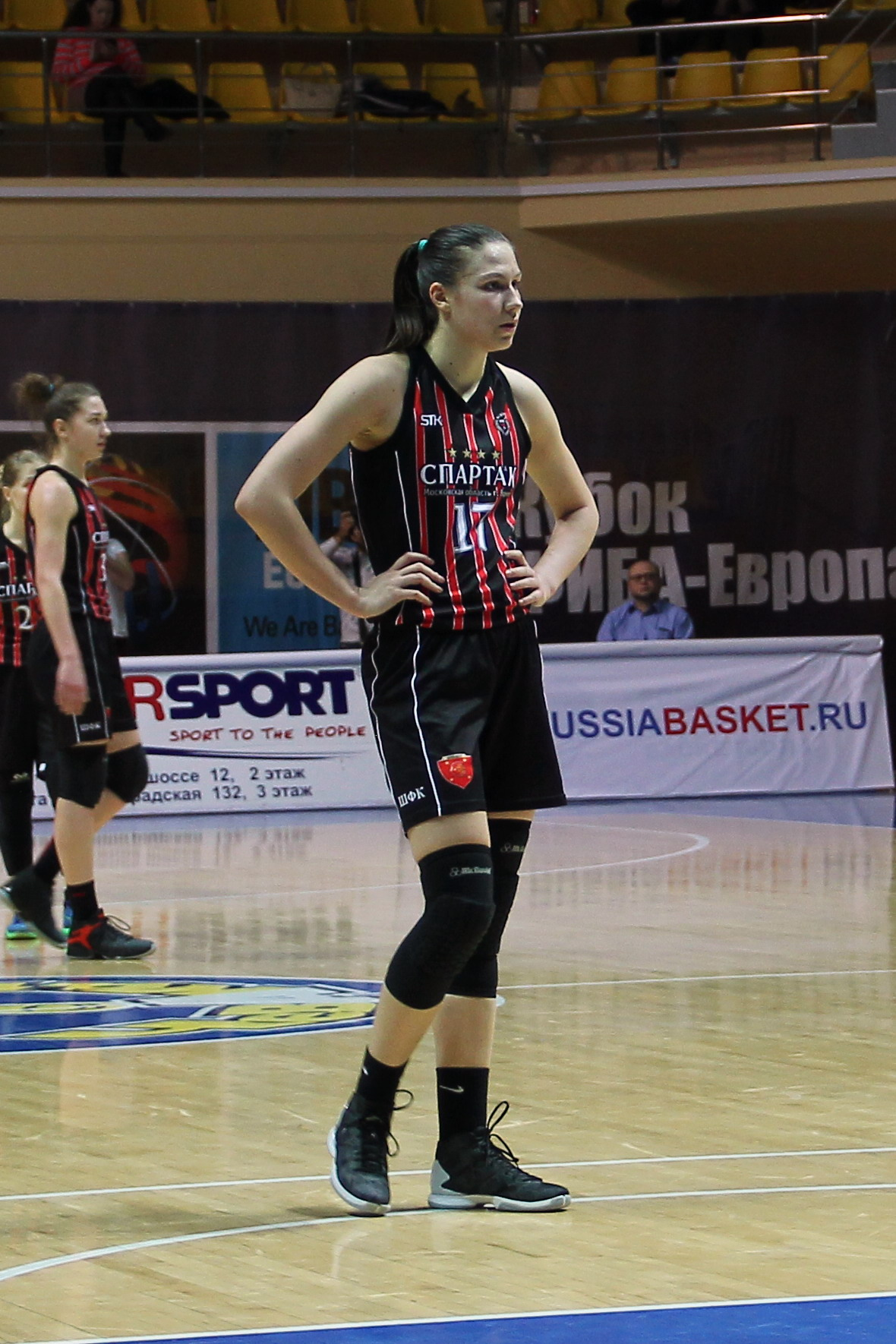

No. 7 – Sparta&K Moscow
- Position: Forward
- League: RPL

Personal information
- Born: 19 April 1996 (age 30) Bratsk, Russia
- Listed height: 5 ft 8 in (1.73 m)

Career information
- Playing career: 2014–present

Career history
- 2014–present: Sparta&K Moscow

Career highlights
- FIBA U19 All-Tournament Team (2015)
Medals
Representing Russia
Basketball
FIBA U19 World Cup
Silver medal – second place	2015 Russia	Team
FIBA Europe Youth Championships
Gold medal – first place	2014 Portugal	U18 Team
Bronze medal – third place	2016 Portugal	U20 Team
Bronze medal – third place	2012 Hungary	U16 Team

Daria Kolosovskaya (Russian: Дарья Колосовская; born 19 April 1996) is a Russian professional basketball player.

== Career ==
=== Europe ===
In 2014, Kolosovskaya began her professional career with Sparta&K Moscow, playing in the Russian Premier League and the EuroCup. Here she played alongside the likes of Stefanie Dolson and Emma Meesseman. Kolosovskaya remained a part of the roster for both the 2015–16 and 2016–17 seasons.

== National team ==
=== Youth level ===
Kolosovskaya made her international debut at the 2012 FIBA Europe Under-16 Championship in Hungary, where Russia took home the bronze. In 2013, Kolosovskaya moved up to the FIBA Europe Under-18 Championship in Croatia, where Russia placed fifth. Kolosovskaya returned to the Under-18s in 2014, helping lead Russia to Gold. Kolosovskaya was then named to the national team for the 2015 FIBA Under-19 World Championship in her home nation. Russia would remain undefeated until the final, falling to the United States and taking home silver. Kolosovskaya was awarded a place on the All-Tournament Team.

=== Senior level ===
In 2016, Kolosovskaya made her senior international debut at the qualifiers for EuroBasket 2017. In her debut showings, Kolosovskaya averaged 5.3 points per game and 2.3 assists per game. However, Kolosovskaya failed to make Russia's final roster for EuroBasket Women 2017 in the Czech Republic.
