= Pinelopi Pavlopoulou =

Greek basketball player

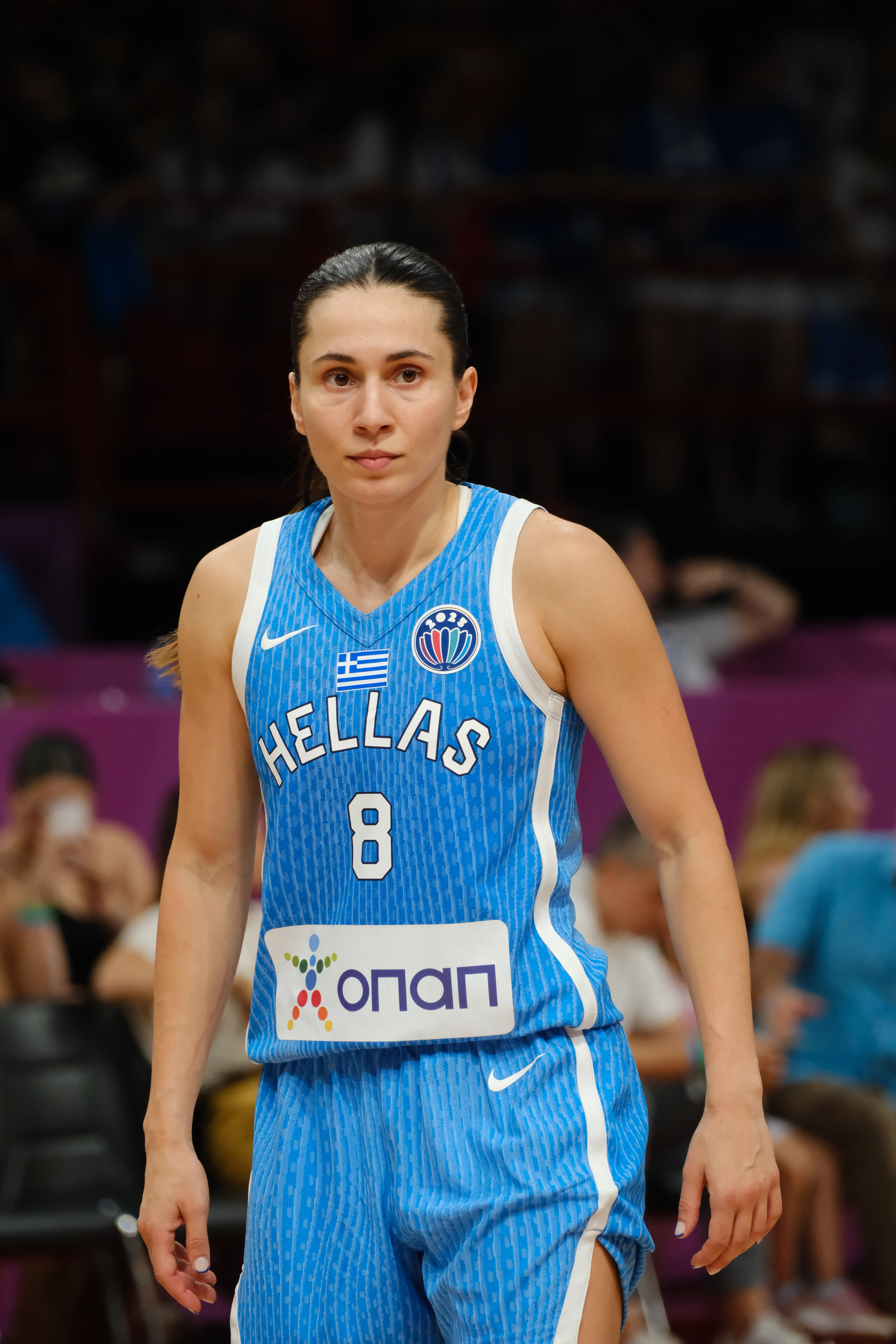
- Pavlopoulou with Greece during the EuroBasket 2025

No. 8 – Athinaikos
- Position: Point guard
- League: Greek League

Personal information
- Born: 3 March 1996 (age 30) Marousi, Greece
- Listed height: 172 cm (5 ft 8 in)

Career information
- College: Washington State (2014–2018)
- WNBA draft: 2018: undrafted
- Playing career: 2012–present

Career history
- 2012–2014: Proteas Voulas
- 2018–2020: Olympiacos
- 2020–2021: ACS Sepsi SIC
- 2021–2022: PAOK Thessaloniki
- 2022: Arka Gdynia
- 2022–2024: Panathinaikos
- 2024: Libertadores
- 2024–2025: Sopron
- 2025–present: Athinaikos

Pinelopi Pavlopoulou (born 3 March 1996) is a Greek basketball player for Athinaikos and the Greek national team.

She participated at the 2018 FIBA Women's Basketball World Cup.

== Washington State statistics ==
Ratios
Year	Team	GP	FG%	3P%	FT%	RBG	APG	BPG	SPG	PPG
2014-15	Washington State	32	34.2%	35.7%	87.5%	1.56	0.84	0.06	0.69	2.09
2015-16	Washington State	30	47.4%	43.5%	78.6%	1.90	1.93	0.07	0.97	4.30
2016-17	Washington State	36	37.9%	28.3%	73.8%	3.86	3.03	-	1.67	8.19
2017-18	Washington State	30	41.7%	40.7%	64.3%	1.97	2.03	0.03	0.80	6.47
Career		128	40.1%	35.2%	74.4%	2.38	1.99	0.04	1.05	5.35

Totals
Year	Team	GP	FG	FGA	3P	3PA	FT	FTA	REB	A	BK	ST	PTS
2014-15	Washington State	32	25	73	10	28	7	8	50	27	2	22	67
2015-16	Washington State	30	54	114	10	23	11	14	57	58	2	29	129
2016-17	Washington State	36	118	311	28	99	31	42	139	109	0	60	295
2017-18	Washington State	30	75	180	35	86	9	14	59	61	1	24	194
Career		128	272	678	83	236	58	78	305	255	5	135	685

== Club honors ==
=== Panathinaikos ===
- 2× Greek Cup Winner: 2023, 2024
