= Emma Eriksson =

Swedish Paralympic athlete

Personal information
- Born: 24 October 1993 (age 32) Kumla, Sweden

Sport
- Sport: Paralympic athletics
- Disability class: F20
- Events: High jump Long jump
- Club: Söderhamns IF
Medal record
Representing Sweden
INAS World Outdoor Championships
Gold medal – first place	2012 Manchester	High jump
INAS World Outdoor Championships
Gold medal – first place	2013 Prague	High jump
INAS European Athletics Championships
Gold medal – first place	2012 Gävle	High jump
Silver medal – second place	2011 Helsinki	High jump
Bronze medal – third place	2011 Helsinki	Long jump
Bronze medal – third place	2012 Gävle	Long jump

Emma Eriksson (born 24 October 1993) is a Swedish former Paralympic athlete who competes in international track and field competitions. She has competed at the 2012 Summer Paralympics where she finished fifth in the long jump F20.
