= Terézia Páleníková =

Slovak basketball player

No. 33 – ESBVA-LM
- Position: Small forward
- League: La Boulangère Wonderligue

Personal information
- Born: August 16, 1995 (age 31) Bratislava, Slovakia
- Listed height: 5 ft 10 in (1.78 m)

Career history
- 2011–2014: BK Petržalka
- 2014–2018: Piešťanské Čajky
- 2018–2019: Ślęza Wrocław
- 2020–2021: Piešťanské Čajky
- 2021–2022: Innova TSN Leganés
- 2022–2023: CDB Clarions Tenerife
- 2023: UNI Girona CB
- 2023–2024: Maccabi Haifa
- 2024-2025: Danilo's Pizza SK
- 2025-present: ESBVA-LM

Terézia Páleníková (born 16 August 1995) is a Slovak basketball player for ESBVA-LM and the Slovak national team. She was named Female Slovak Basketball Player of the Year in 2022.

== Biography ==
Terézia Páleníková was born on 16 August 1995 in Bratislava. She started playing basketball as a 10 years old.

Her older sister Marta was also a professional basketball player until her retirement in 2018.

== Career ==
=== National team ===
She was a member of the Team Slovakia at the EuroBasket Women 2017, EuroBasket Women 2021 and EuroBasket Women 2023.
