= Emese Hof =

Dutch basketball player (born 1996)

Emese Eva Hof

No. 21 – Galatasaray
- Position: Center
- League: Turkish Super League; EuroLeague Women

Personal information
- Born: 29 May 1996 (age 30) Utrecht, Netherlands
- Listed height: 1.91 m (6 ft 3 in)

Career information
- College: Miami (FL) (2015–2019)
- WNBA draft: 2019: undrafted
- Playing career: 2019–present

Career history
- 2019–2022: CB Avenida
- 2022–2026: ZVVZ USK Praha
- 2026: Minnesota Lynx
- 2026–present: Galatasaray

Career highlights
- EuroLeague Women champion (2025)
- Stats at WNBA.com
- Stats at Basketball Reference

Emese Eva Hof (born 29 May 1996) is a Dutch female basketball player. The 1.91 m (6 ft 3 in) tall national plays Center.

== Club career ==
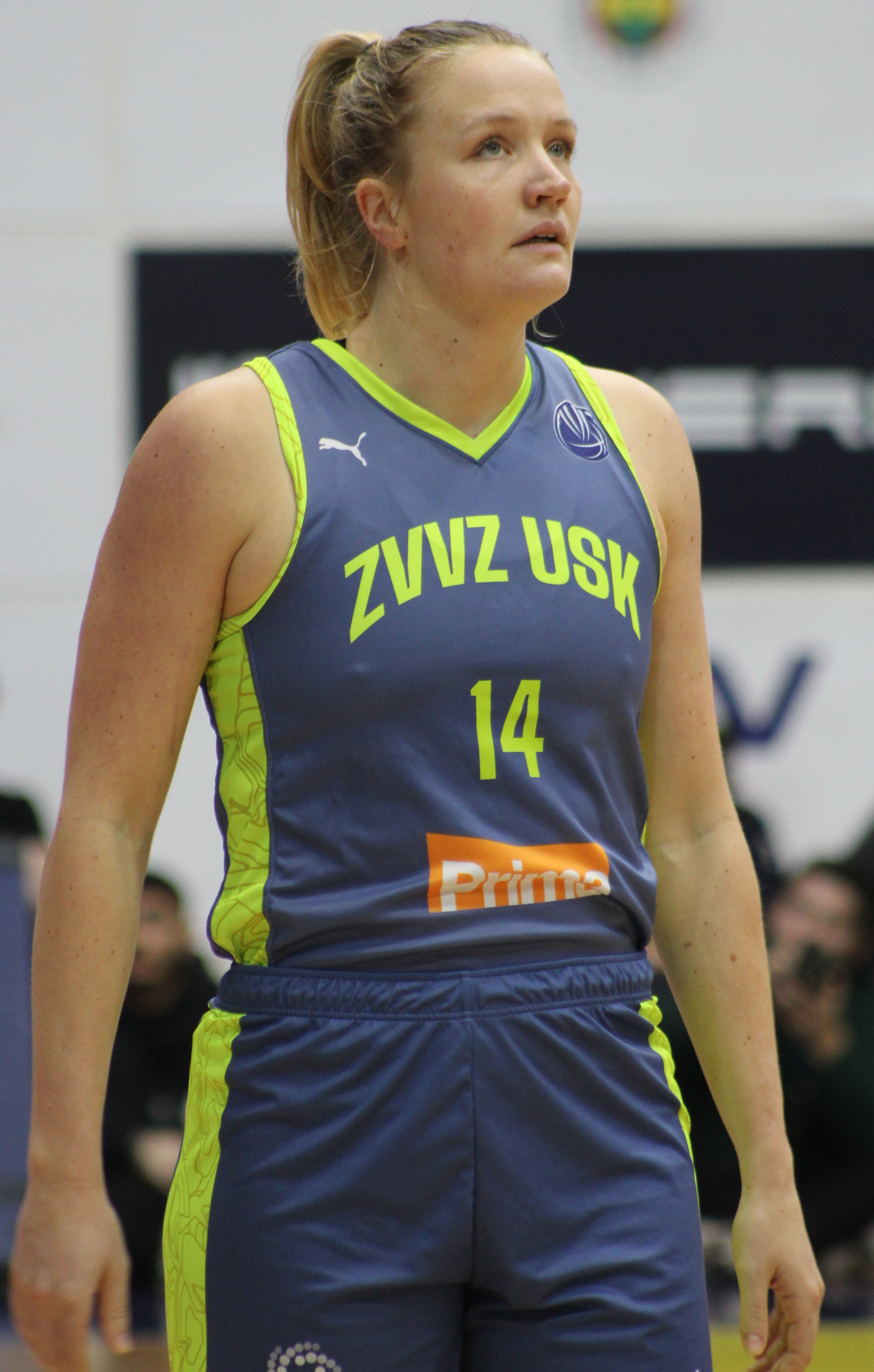
Hof in 2024

On July 27, 2026, she signed a contract with the Turkish giant Galatasaray.
