= Kseniia Levchenko =

Russian basketball player

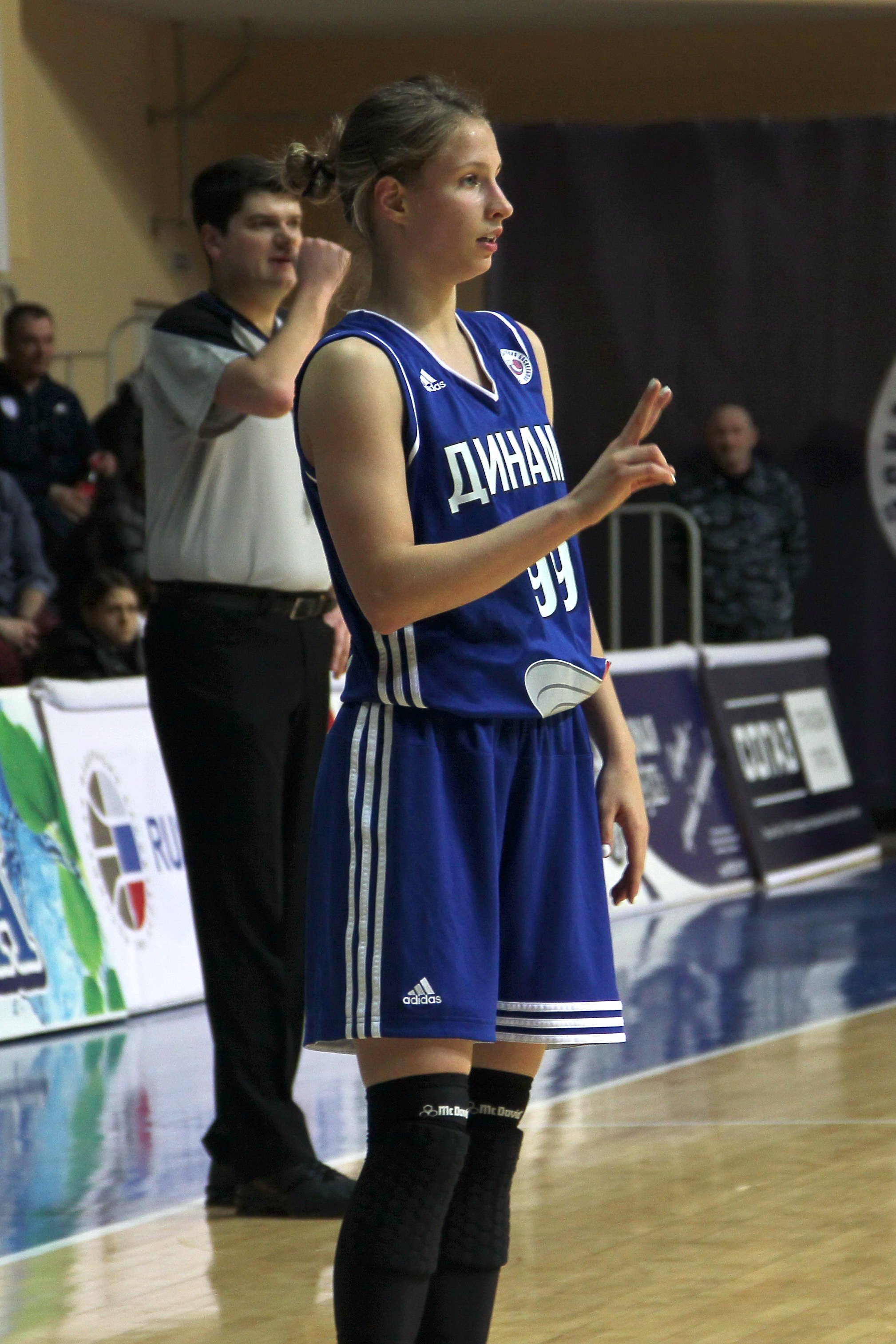
- Levchenko in 2016

No. 91 – UMMC Ekaterinburg
- Position: Point guard
- League: RPL

Personal information
- Born: March 29, 1996 (age 30) Tynda, Russia
- Listed height: 5 ft 5 in (1.65 m)

Career information
- Playing career: 2010–present

Career history
- 2010–2015: WBC Sparta&K
- 2015–2019: Dynamo Kursk
- 2019: Yenisey
- 2019–2021: WBC Sparta&K
- 2021–2022: Dynamo Kursk
- 2022–: UMMC Ekaterinburg

Career highlights
- EuroLeague Women champion (2017)
Medals
Women's basketball
Representing (Russia) Russia
Eurobasket U16
| Bronze medal – third place | 2012 Hungary |
EuroBasket U18
| Gold medal – first place | 2014 Portugal |
World Cup U19
| Silver medal – second place | 2015 Russia |

Kseniia Alexeyevna Levchenko (Russian: Ксения Алексеевна Левченко; born March 29, 1996) is a Russian basketball player for Dynamo Kursk and the Russian national team. She participated at the EuroBasket Women 2017. She won the EuroLeague in 2017 with Dynamo Kursk.
