= Suceava =

Municipality in Suceava County, Romania

- Municipality
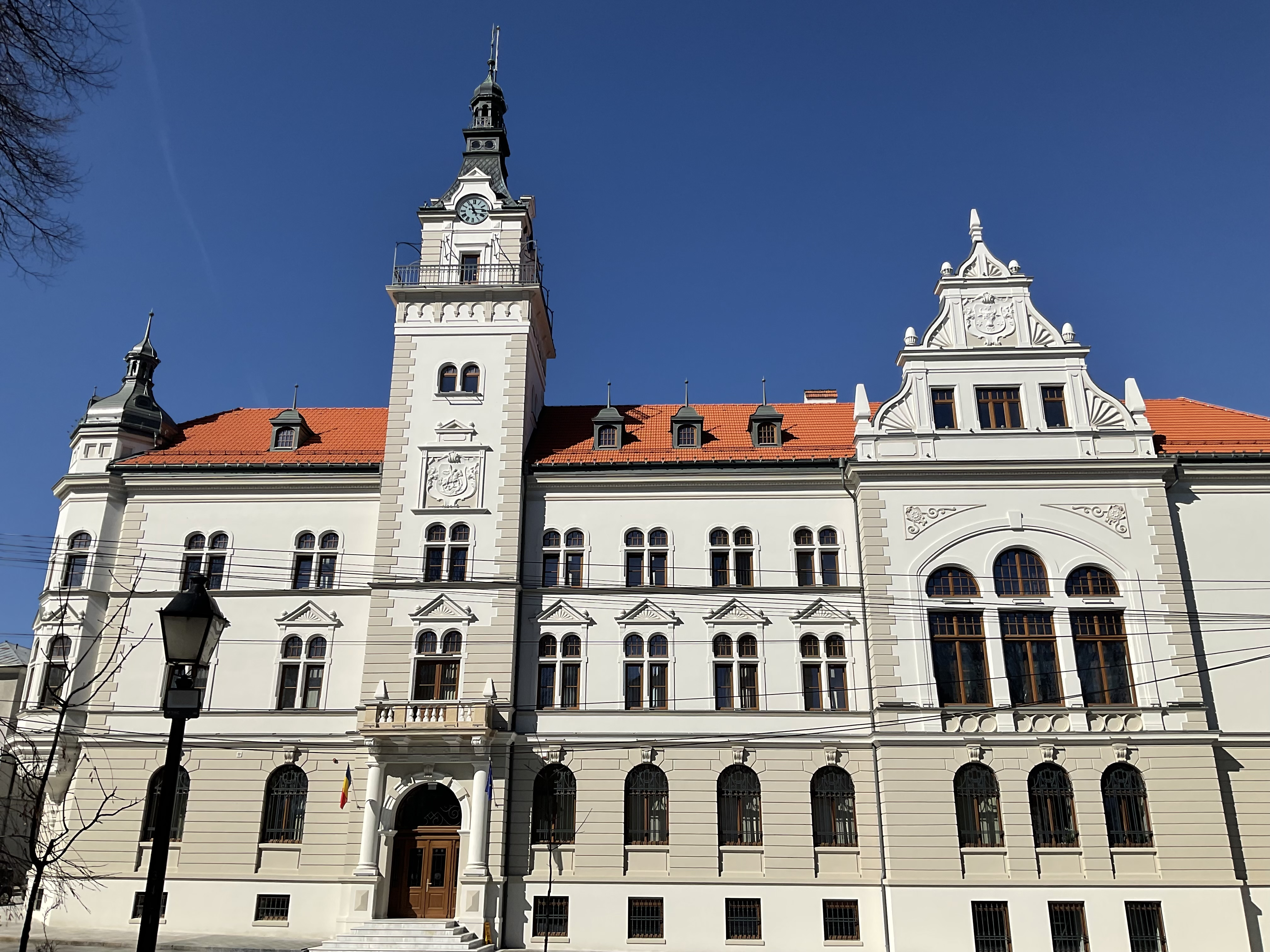
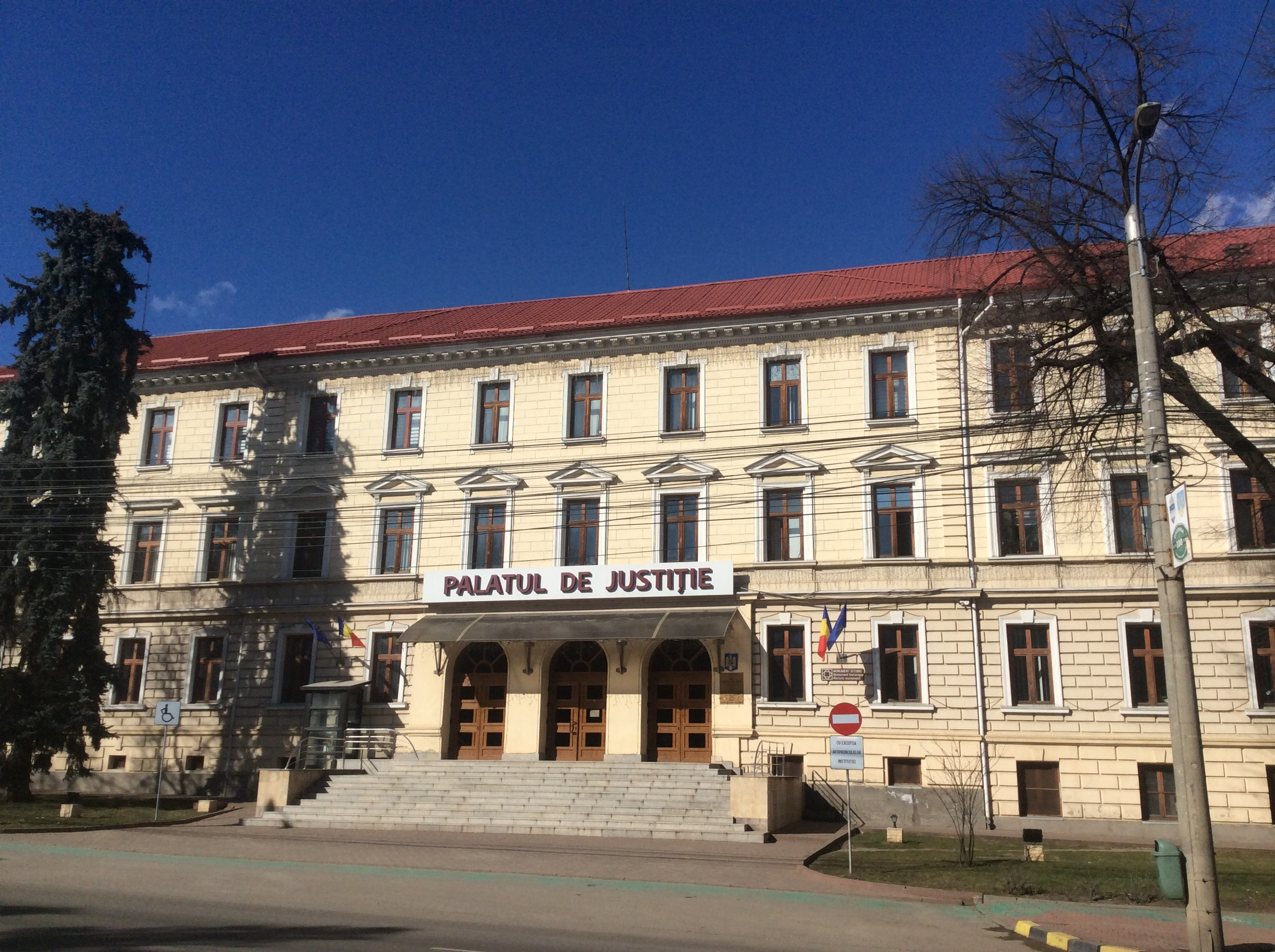
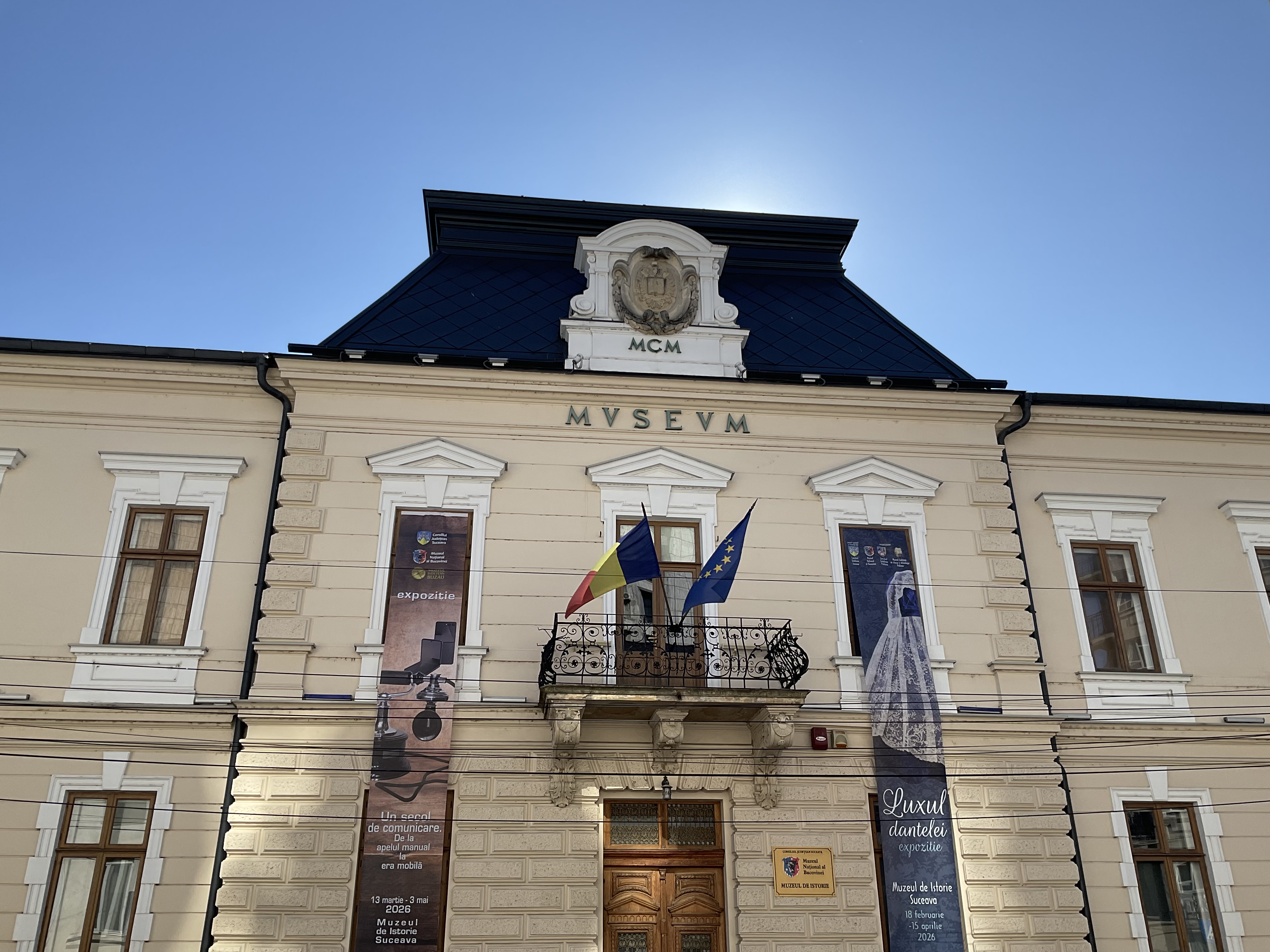
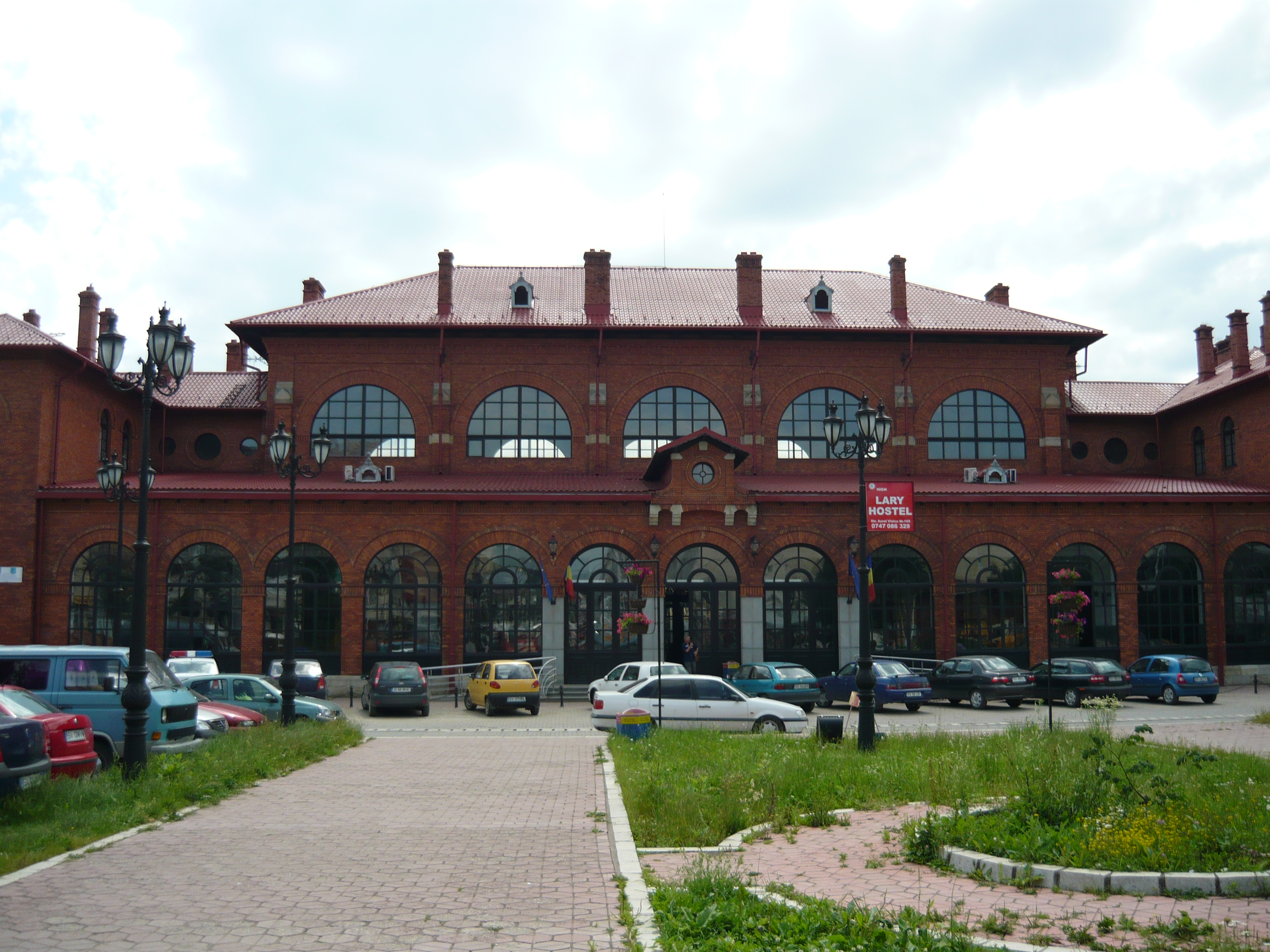
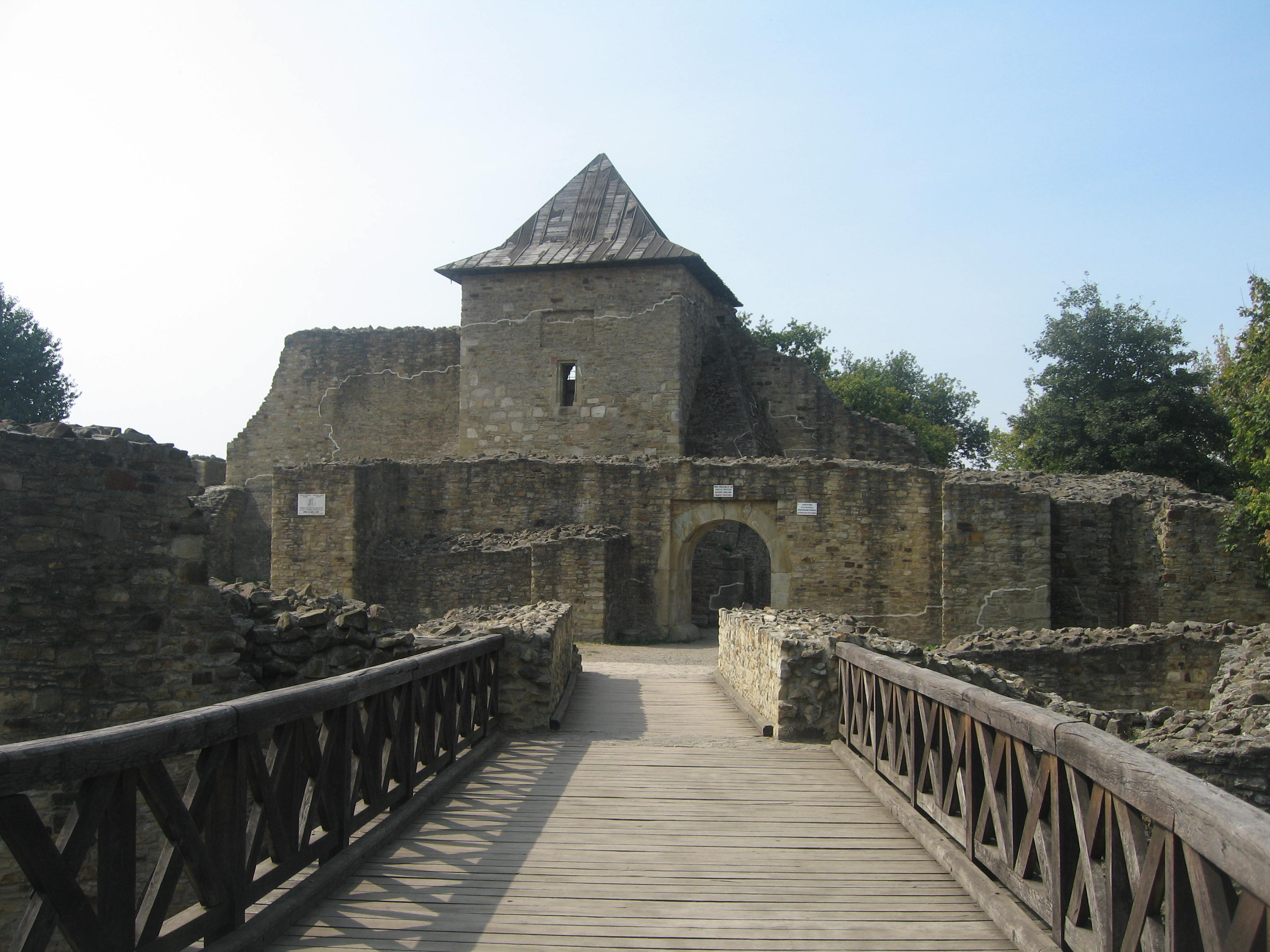
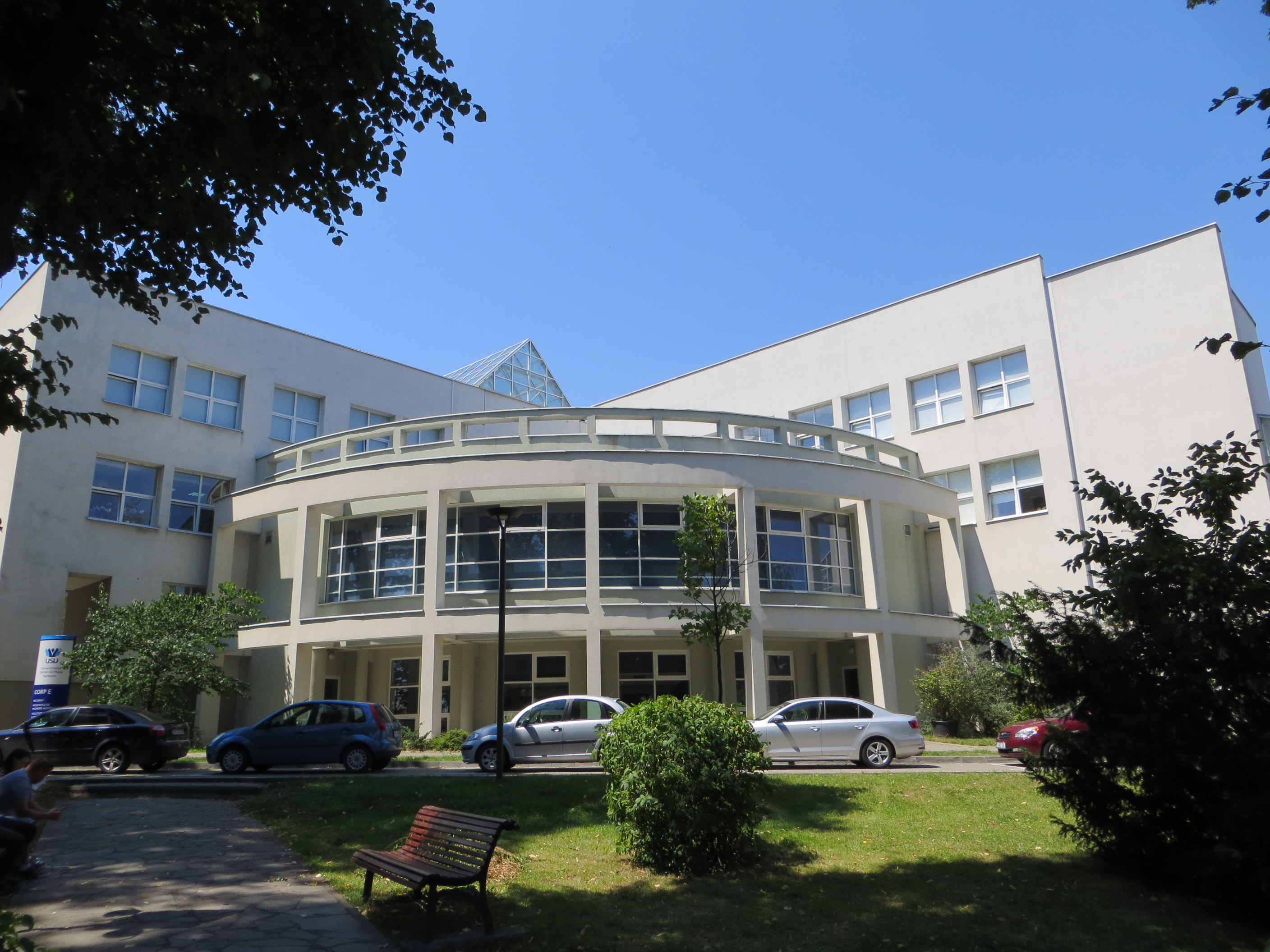
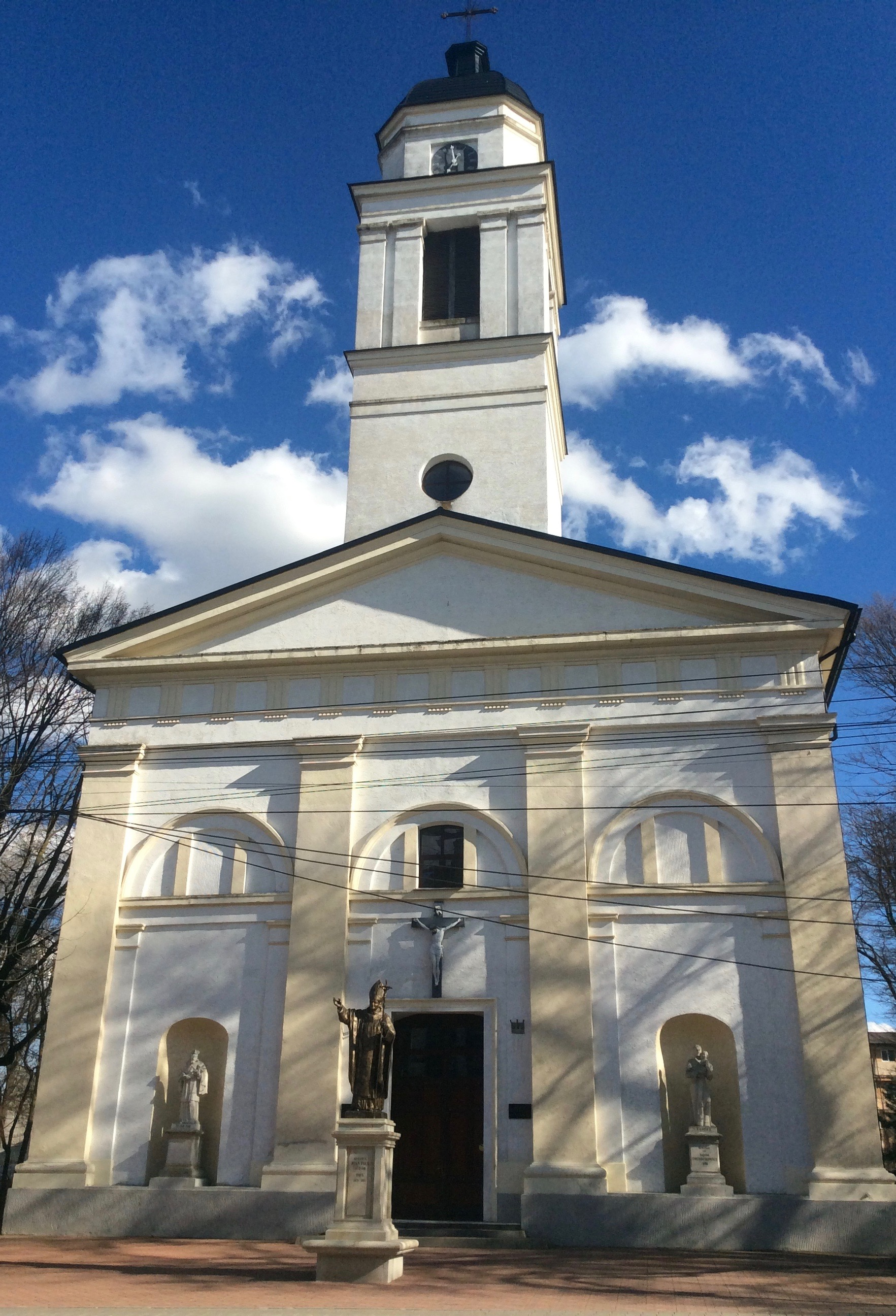
- Administrative Palace The Justice Palace Bukovina Museum Suceava railway station Fortress of Suceava Ștefan cel Mare University St. John of Nepomuk Church

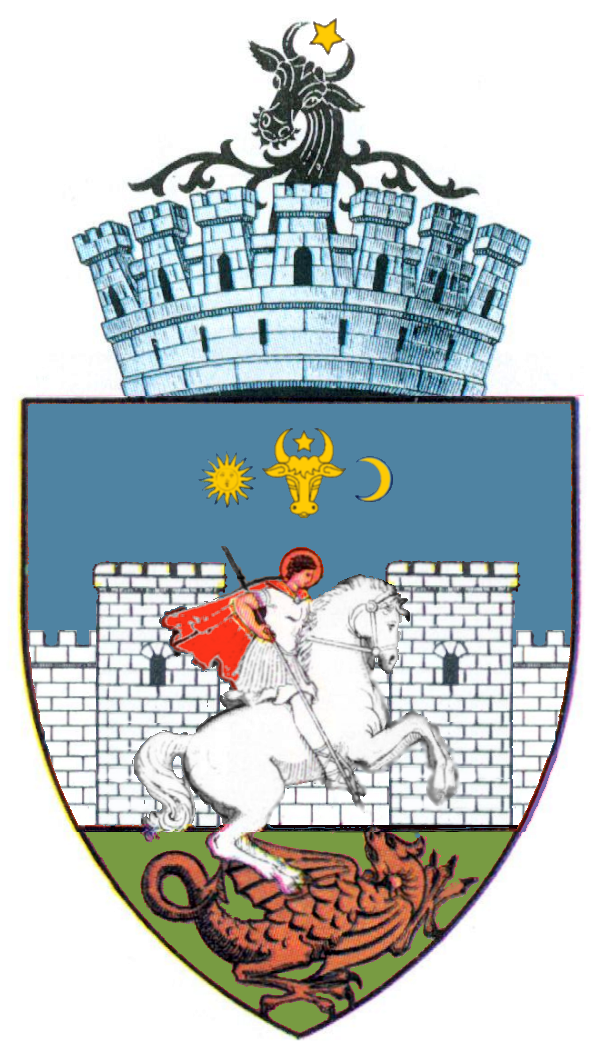
- Coat of arms

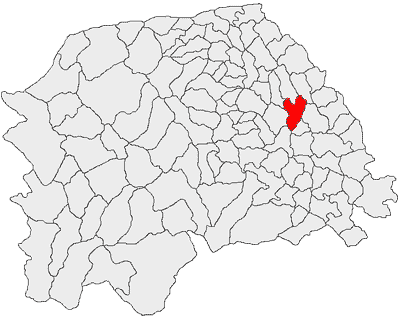
- Location in Suceava County

- Location of Suceava Suceava (Europe)
- Coordinates: 47°39′05″N 26°15′20″E
- Country: Romania
- County: Suceava County
- Status: County seat

Government
  - Mayor (2024–2028): Vasile Rîmbu (PSD)

Area
  - Municipality: 52.10 km^{2} (20.12 sq mi)
  - Metro: 473.29 km^{2} (182.74 sq mi)

Population (2022)
  - Municipality: 84,308
  - Density: 1,618/km^{2} (4,191/sq mi)
- Romanian ethnic majority with a few smaller minority groups
- Demonym(s): sucevean, suceveancă (ro)
- Time zone: UTC+2 (EET)
  - Summer (DST): UTC+3 (EEST)
- Climate: Dfb
- Website: Primăria Suceava (ro, en)

Suceava (Romanian: [suˈtʃe̯ava]) is a city in northeastern Romania. The seat of Suceava County, it is situated in the historical regions of Bukovina and Western Moldavia. It is the largest urban settlement and county seat of Suceava County, with a population of 84,308 inhabitants according to the 2021 Romanian census.

During the Late Middle Ages, namely between 1388 and 1564 (or from the late 14th century to the late 16th century), this middle-sized town was the capital of the Principality of Moldavia. Later on, it became an important, strategically located commercial town of the Habsburg monarchy, Austrian Empire, and Austria-Hungary (formerly belonging to Cisleithania or the Austrian part of the dual monarchy) on the border with the Romanian Old Kingdom.

Nowadays, the town is known for its reconstructed medieval seat fortress (further rebuilt through the EU-funded Regio programme) and its UNESCO-recognized World Heritage Site Saint John the New Monastery (part of the Churches of Moldavia), both local and national tourist attractions. In addition, the Administrative Palace, a historic and civic building dating to imperial Austrian times and designed by Austrian architect Peter Paul Brang, is located in the historic town centre along with the Roman Catholic Saint John of Nepomuk church (one building facing the other). Suceava is also an academic centre of Romania, represented by the Ștefan cel Mare University of Suceava (USV).

Suceava is the 22nd largest Romanian city. The city's population increased exponentially during the second half of the 20th century, from just over 10,000 people in the late 1940s to over 100,000 in the early 1990s.

== Historical background ==
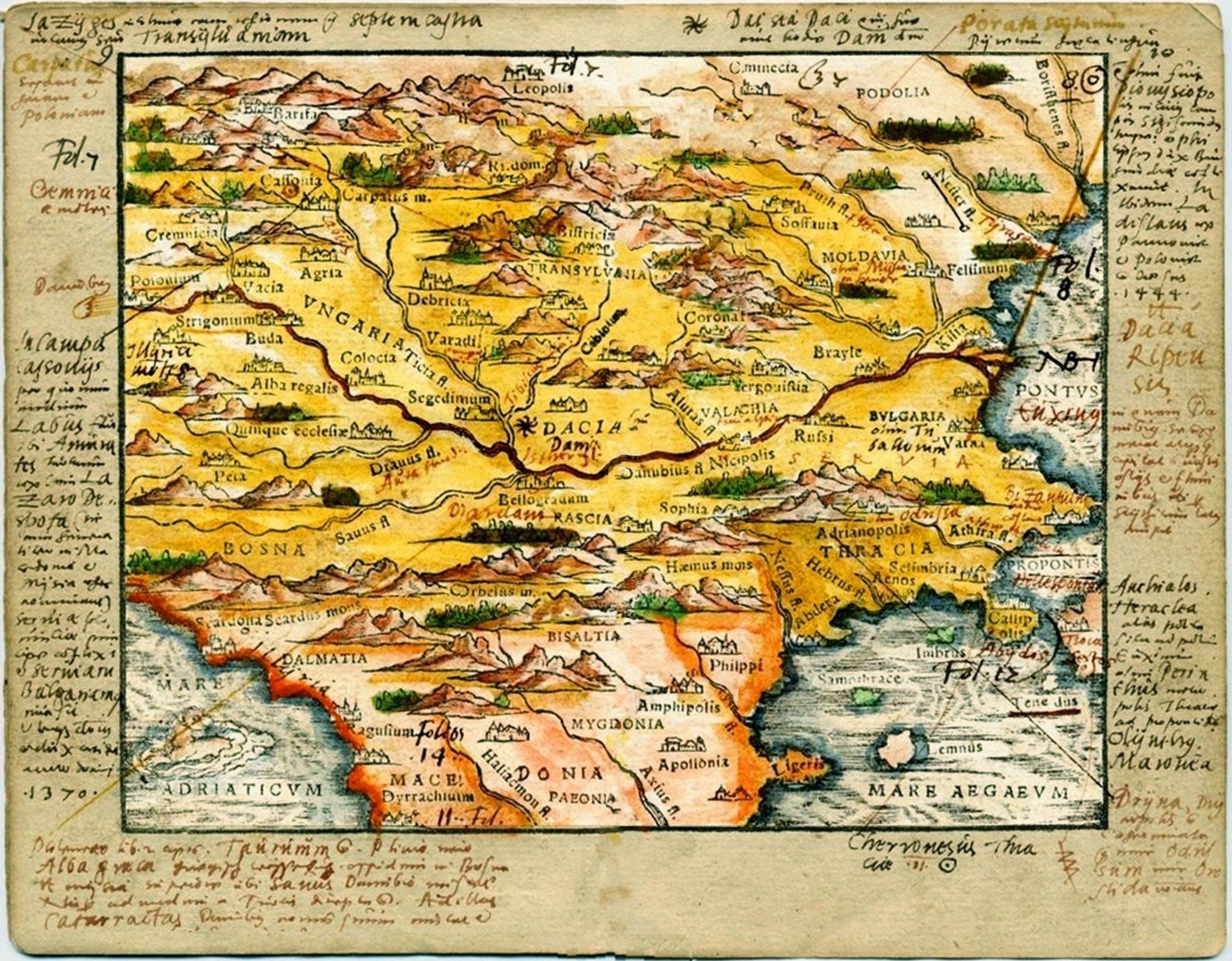
Suceava, marked with a castle and an obsolete variant of its name, to the north-east of this 16h century Latin-language map by Transylvanian Saxon scholar Johannes Honterus.

During the Late Middle Ages, the town of Suceava was the capital of the Principality of Moldavia, being strategically located at the crossroads of several trade routes linking Central Europe with Eastern Europe, and, more specifically for that period of time, the former Principality of Moldavia with the Kingdom of Poland and the Kingdom of Hungary respectively. The town of Suceava had also operated under the Magdeburg law back in the Middle Ages (German: Das Magdeburger Recht).

From 1775 to 1918, Suceava was under the administration of the Habsburg Empire, initially part of its Kingdom of Galicia and Lodomeria, then gradually becoming the third most populous urban settlement of the Duchy of Bukovina, a constituent land of the Austrian Empire and subsequently a crown land within the Austrian part of Austria-Hungary. During this time, Suceava was an important, strategically located commercial border town with the then Romanian Old Kingdom to the south-east (Romanian: Vechiul Regat, German: Altreich).

Throughout the Austrian-ruled period of Bukovina, Suceava was also regarded as a 'miniature Austria' by native intellectual Rudolf Gassauer given its significant ethnic diversity (which, up until the early 20th century, included an overwhelming majority of ethnic Germans, more specifically Bukovina Germans, as well). An even older ethnic German presence in the town (as well as in the entire region of Bukovina) can be traced back to the end of the 14th century, more specifically during the Late Middle Ages (represented by a relatively small group of Transylvanian Saxons).

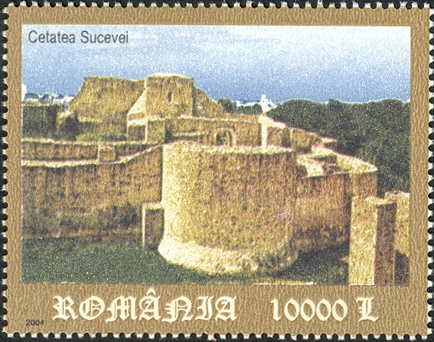
The Medieval Seat Fortress of Suceava (Romanian: Cetatea de Scaun a Sucevei), as depicted on a 2004 Romanian stamp.

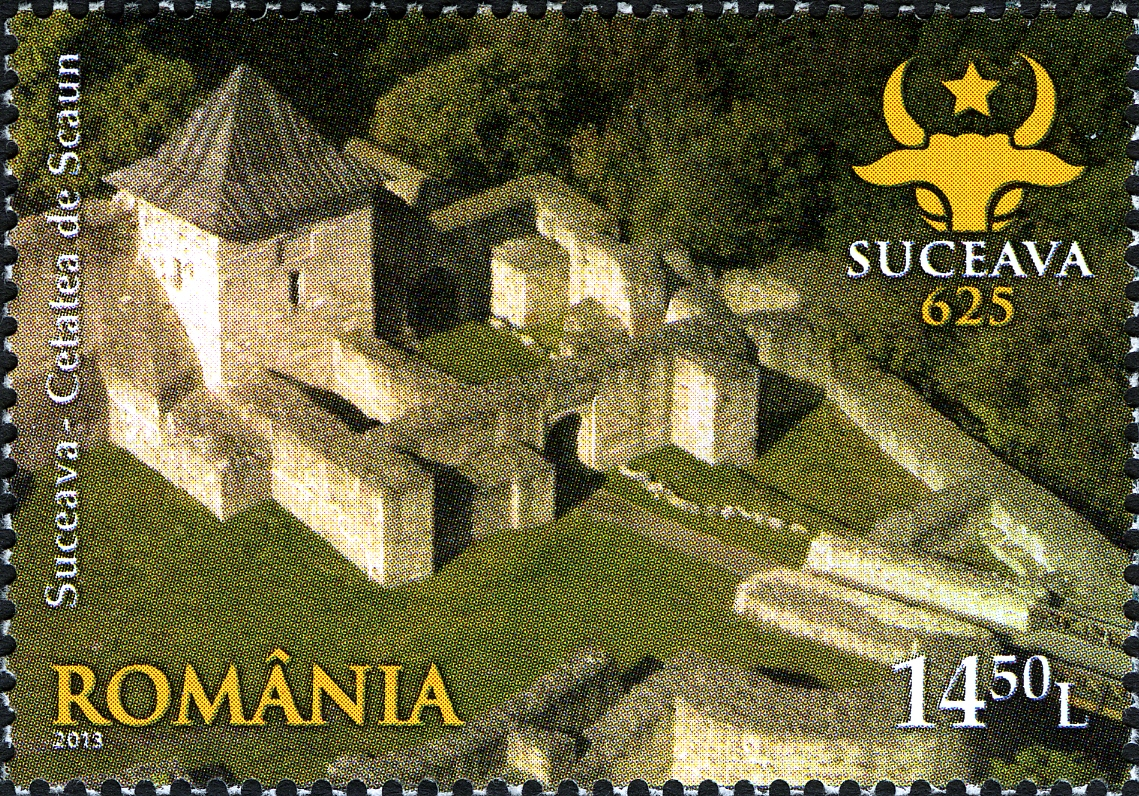
The Medieval Seat Fortress of Suceava, as depicted on a 2013 Romanian stamp, commemorating its 625th anniversary.

In the wake of World War I, after 1918, along with the rest of Bukovina, Suceava became part of the then newly enlarged Kingdom of Romania. After the end of World War II, the town slowly underwent a process of communist systematization which increased its population approximately tenfold throughout the decades prior to the 1989 Romanian Revolution. It became a municipality in 1968. Suceava is also crossed by the namesake river, a tributary of Siret, to the northwest, in the neighbourhood of Ițcani (German: Itzkany).

An important market town at the crossroads of several Central and Eastern European commercial routes since the Middle Ages (toward the Kingdom of Hungary to the west and the Kingdom of Poland to the north), Suceava is still an important commercial town nowadays.The city is also a railway junction on CFR Line 500, from which a line branches off westward towards Transylvania.

== Names and etymology ==
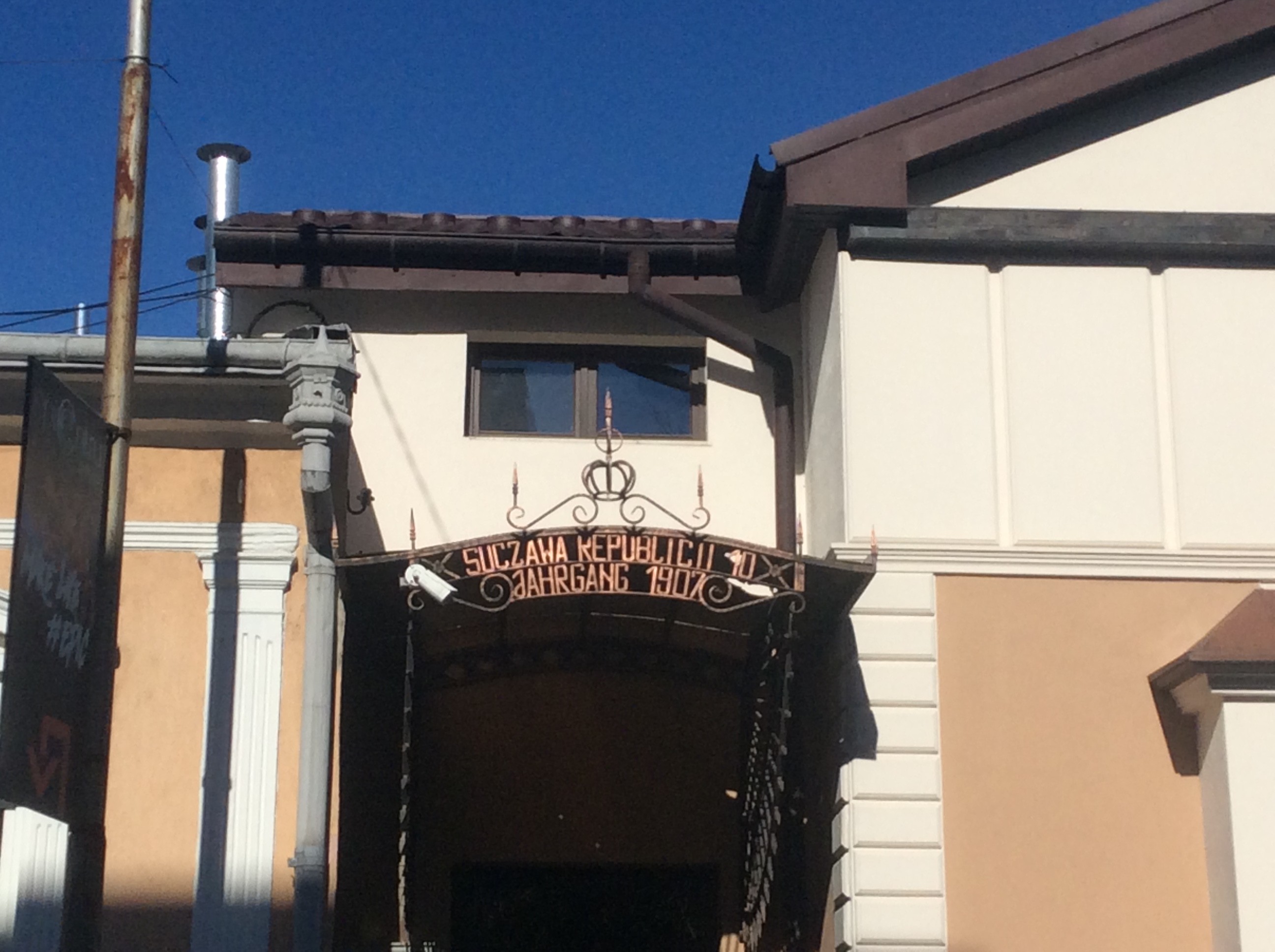
German-language inscription with the name of the town in the town centre of Suceava. (Note: The inscription also includes its original year which was 1907, when the town was still under Austria-Hungary, in the Austrian-ruled part of the dual monarchy or Cisleithania more specifically.) (Note: The German name of the town (i.e. Suczawa) is identical to the Polish name of the town as well.)

Moldavian chronicler Grigore Ureche presumed the name of the town came from the Hungarian Szűcsvár, which is combined of the words szűcs (i.e. furrier, skinner) and vár (i.e. castle). This was taken over by Dimitrie Cantemir, who, in his work Descriptio Moldaviae, gave the very same explanation of the origin of the town's name; however, there is neither historical nor vernacular evidence for this. According to another theory, the town bears the name of the river with the same name and that, in turn, is supposed to be of Ukrainian origin.

In Old German, the town was known as Sedschopff, in both contemporary German (i.e. Standard German/Hochdeutsch) and Old German sources it can be found under such variations as Sotschen, Sutschawa, or Suczawa (most commonly), in Hungarian as Szucsáva ([ˈsut͡ʃaːvɒ]) or Szőcsvásár (most likely according to his work Letopisețul Țării Moldovei până la Aron Vodă written in Romanian), in Polish as Suczawa, in Ukrainian as Сучава (Sučava), while in Yiddish as שאָץ ([ʃɔts]).

== History ==
Historical affiliations

Moldavia (1388–1775)
Habsburg Monarchy (1775–1804)
Austrian Empire (1804–1867)
Austria-Hungary, Cisleithania (1867–1918)
Kingdom of Romania (1918–1947)
Romanian People's Republic (1947–1965)
Socialist Republic of Romania (1965–1989)
Romania (1989–present)

=== Antiquity ===
The present-day territory of the town of Suceava and the adjacent surroundings were already inhabited since the Paleolithic period. Stemming from the late Antiquity, there are also traces of Dacian oppidum of the 2nd century. In stark contrast to several other historical regions of Romania (most notably Transylvania and Oltenia), Suceava (along with the entire region of Bukovina for that matter) was not conquered by the legions of the Roman Empire and consequently was one of the lands of the Free Dacian tribes during ancient times. Nonetheless, according to ancient Roman scholar Ptolemy, at that time in the region also dwelled two likely Celtic-speaking tribes, more specifically the Anartes and the Taurisci, as well as the Germanic Bastarnae, who have also been attested there. The presence of Celtic-speaking tribes in Bukovina is further attested during the late La Tène culture period through archaeological studies.

=== Middle Ages ===
After the fall of Rome and during the Migration Period, the predominantly Carpiani population was successively invaded by East Germanic peoples (such as the Goths or the Gepids), Huns, Slavs, Magyars (i.e. Hungarians), Pechenegs, and ultimately Cumans.

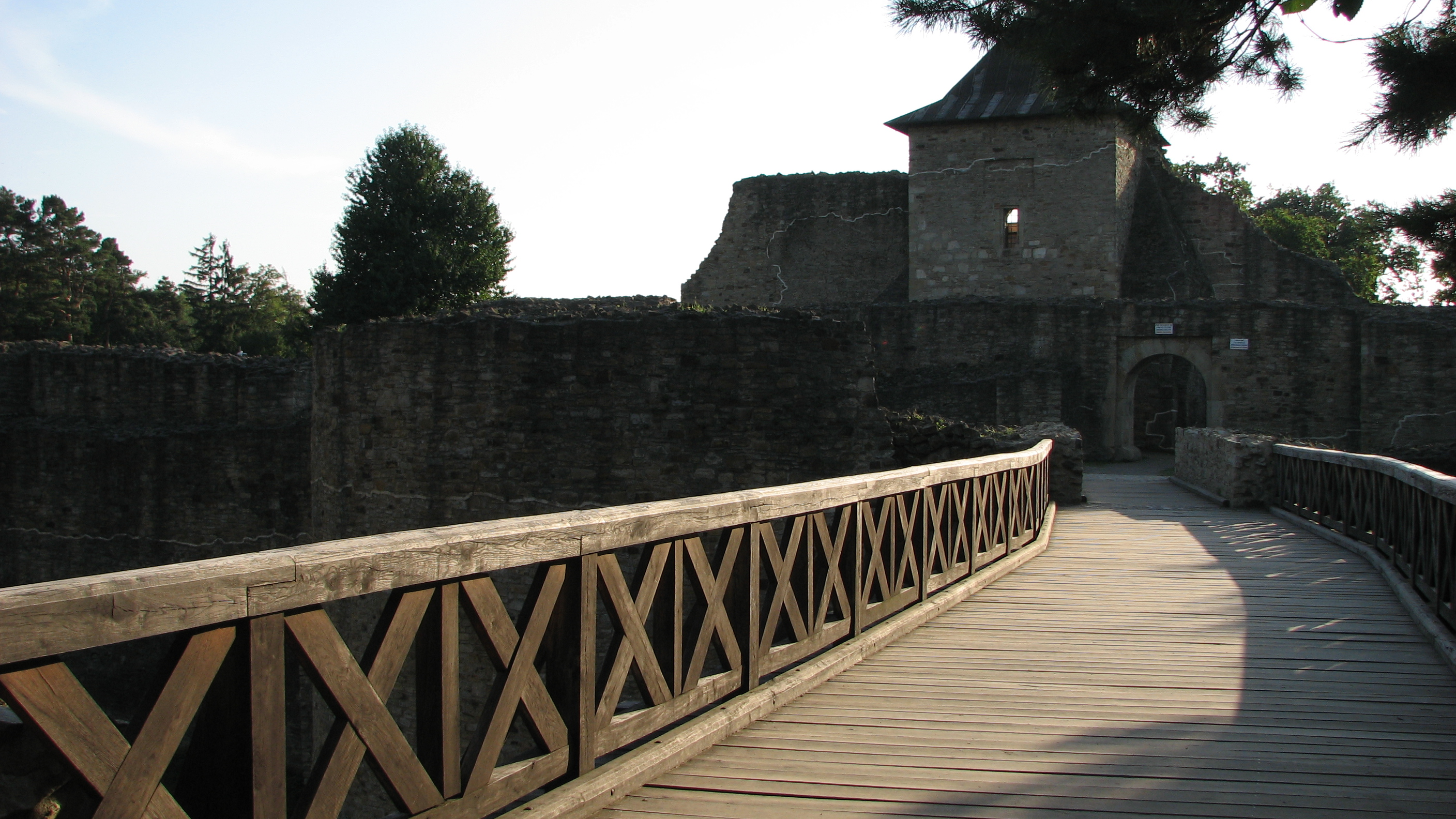
The access bridge towards the medieval Suceava Seat Fortress (Romanian: Cetatea de Scaun a Sucevei), as seen in August, 2007.

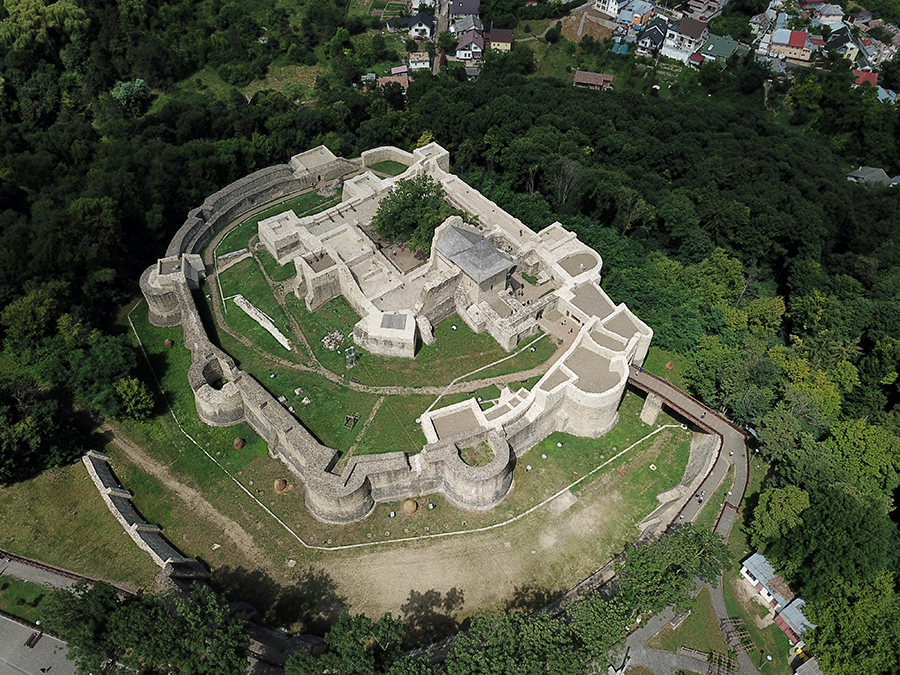
Elevated view of the medieval Seat Fortress of Suceava (2019)

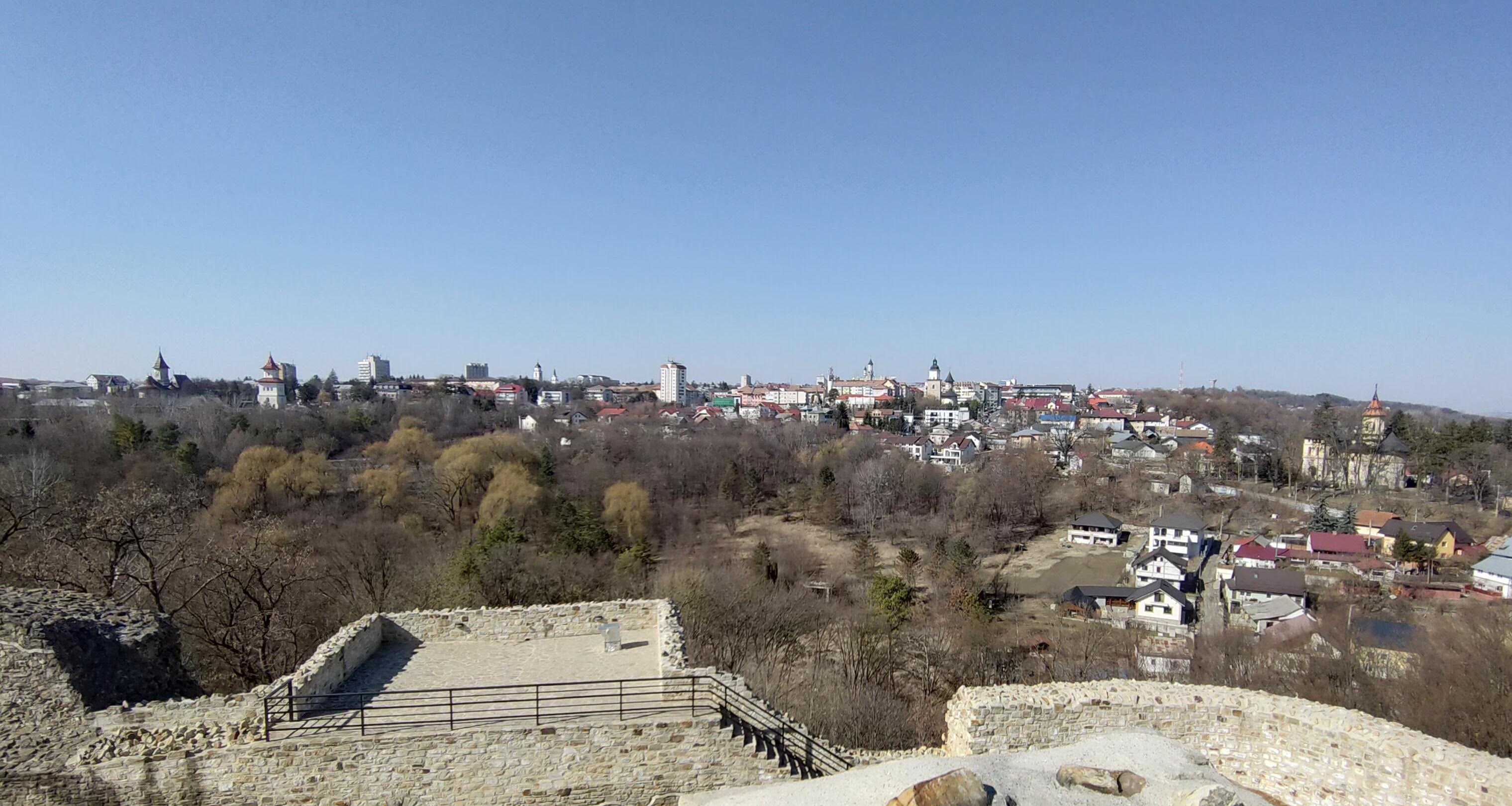
Suceava's town centre, seen from the medieval seat fortress, in March, 2022.

When the town was established and very shortly afterwards, its trade was also facilitated with other Central European towns and markets by a local community of German potters and merchants (quite probably Transylvanian Saxons from Bistrița/Bistritz area) who migrated here during the Ostsiedlung. At the same time, the town had operated under the Magdeburg law (a type of medieval German town law applied mostly in Eastern Europe, but also in several parts of Central Europe), as was the case of Câmpulung Moldovenesc (German: Kimpolung), Siret (German: Sereth), Baia (German: Baja, Stadt Molde, or Moldenmarkt), or Târgu Neamț (German: Niamtz), all which were also situated on the territory of the Principality of Moldavia (more specifically on its northern area or the highlands).

As it was the case of other medieval towns in which the Magdeburg law held sway, this particular German town law came hand in hand with the medieval municipal law (discernible with the foundation of Freiburg im Breisgau in the early 12th century) and the Sachsenspiegel (an important law book during the time of the Holy Roman Empire). The town of Suceava is referred to as Sotschen (an Old High German name) in one of the works of Abraham Ortelius on European geography for the 15th and 16th centuries.

During the late Middle Ages, the town of Suceava was the capital of the Principality of Moldavia and the main residence of the Moldavian princes for nearly two centuries (namely between 1388 and 1564). The town was the capital of the lands of Stephen the Great, one of the pivotal royal figures in Romanian history, who died in Suceava in 1504. During the rule of Alexandru Lăpușneanu, the seat was moved to Iași in 1565 and Suceava failed to become the capital again. Michael the Brave captured the town in 1600 during the Moldavian Magnate Wars as he became the ruler of Wallachia, Moldavia, and Transylvania, but he was defeated during the same year. In 1653, Suceava was sieged.

=== Habsburg rule and unification with the Kingdom of Romania ===
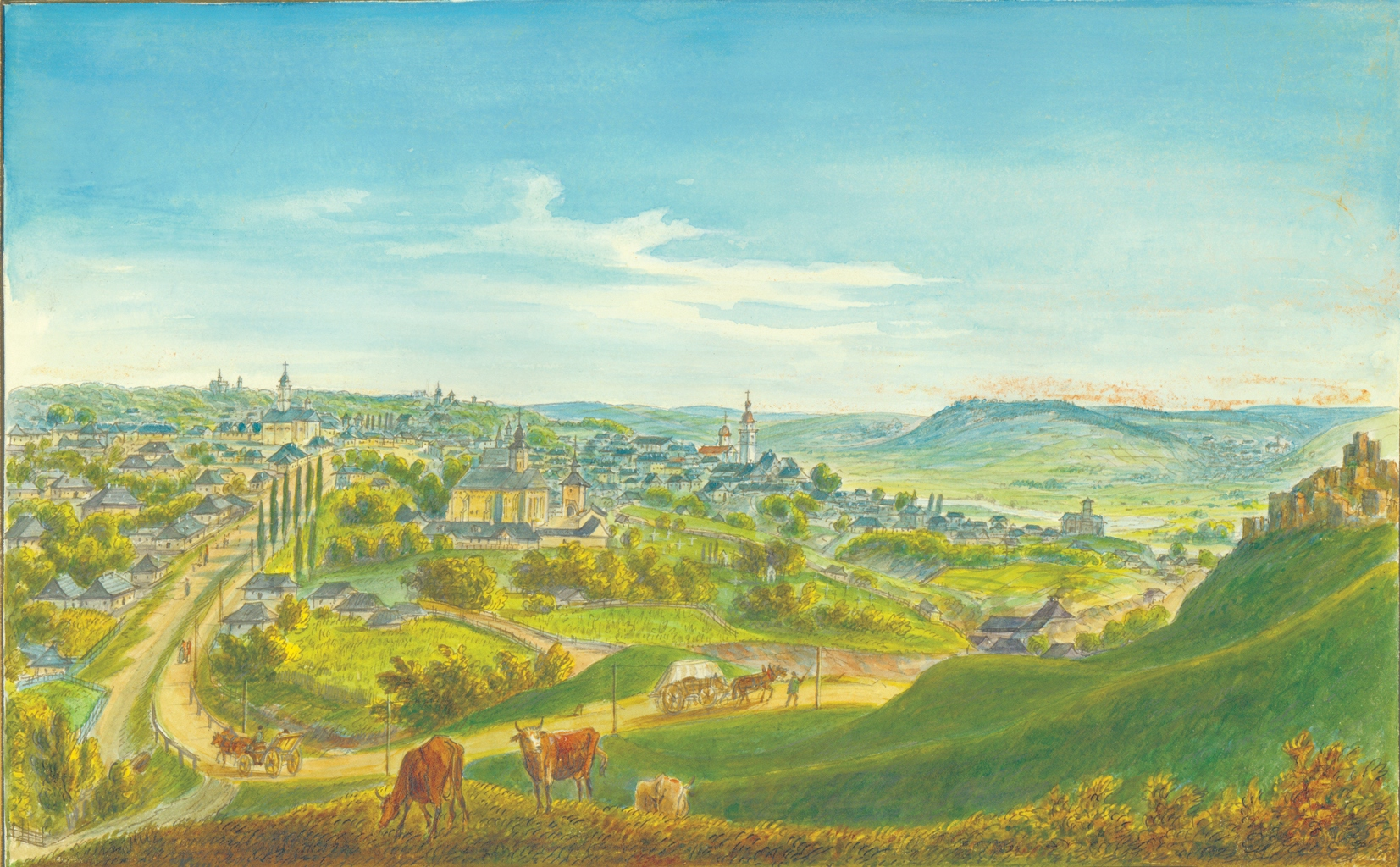
Artist's impression of the town Suceava from 1867 by Austrian painter Franz Xaver Knapp.

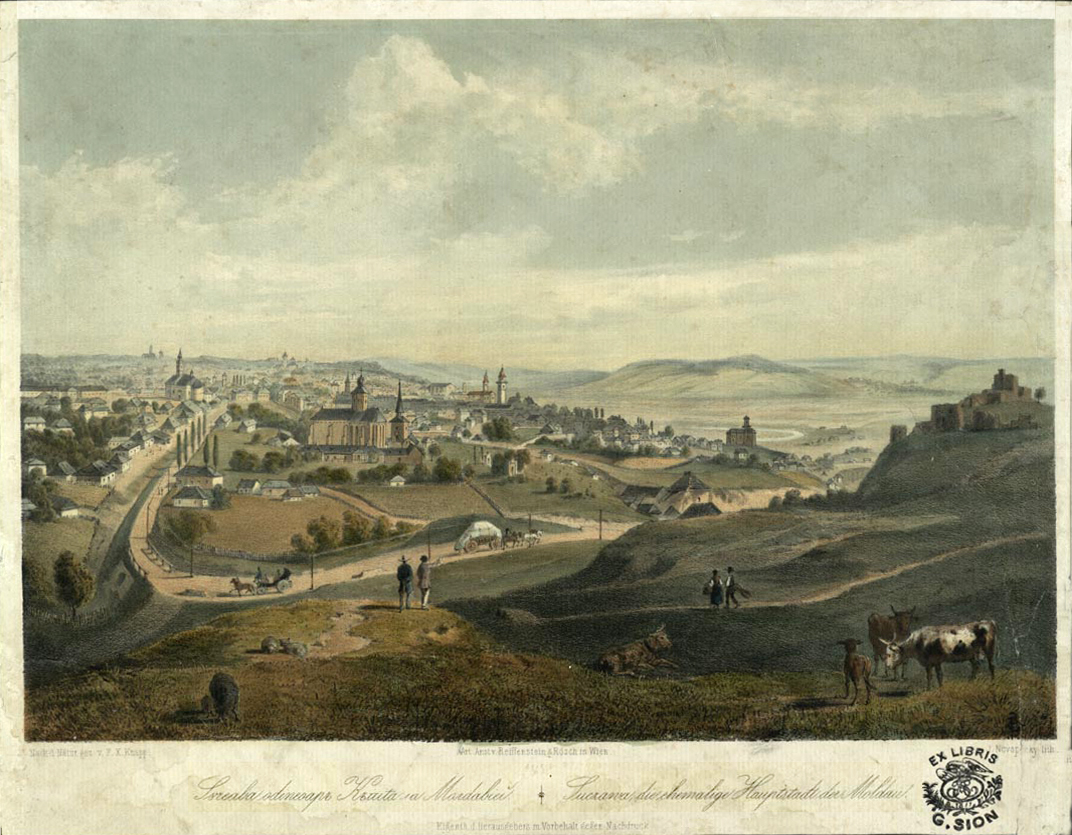
Artist's impression of the town of Suceava from 1870 by Austrian painter Franz Xaver Knapp.

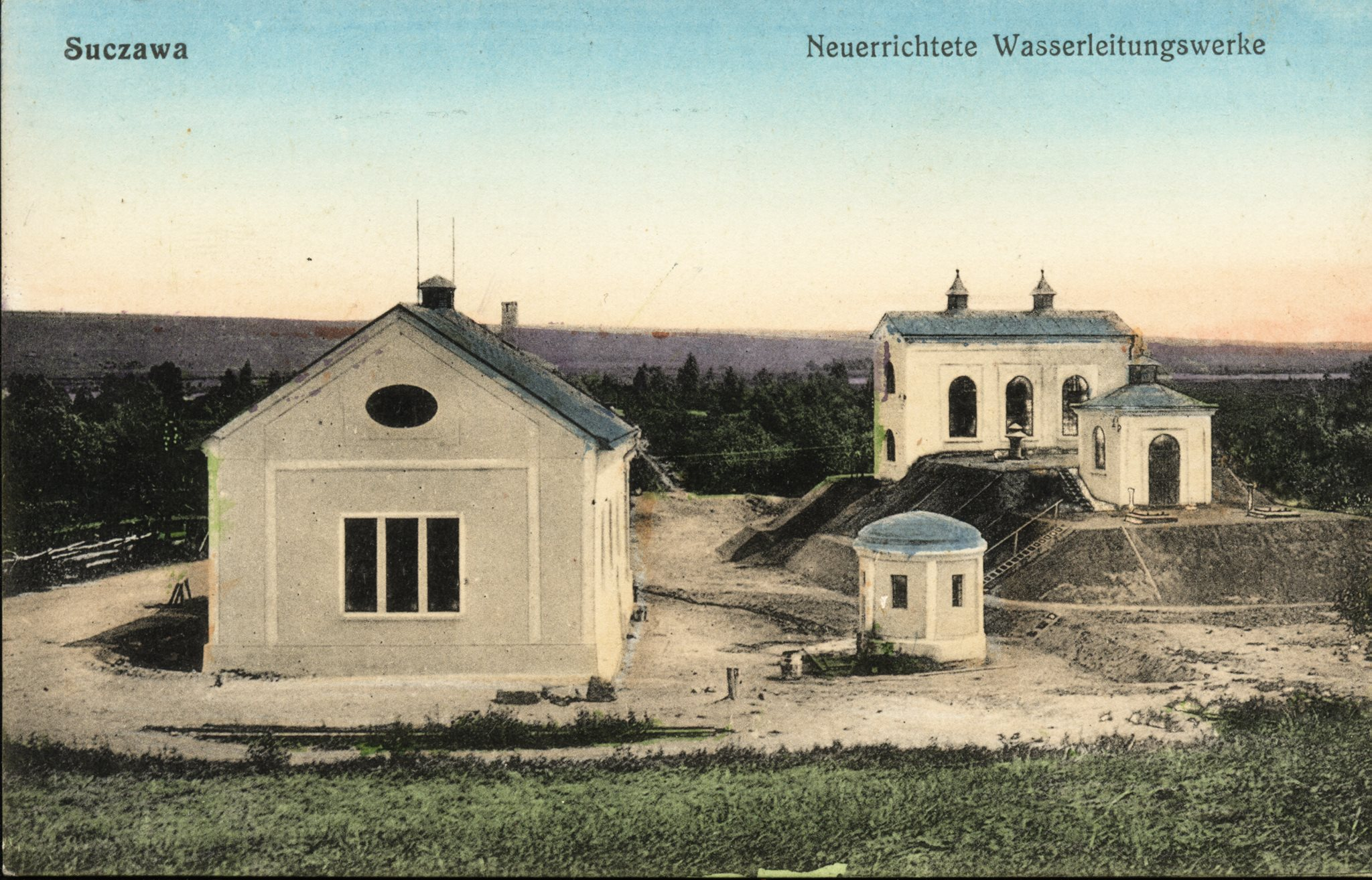
The Water Plant in Suceava (as depicted on an Austrian postcard)

Together with the rest of Bukovina, Suceava was under the rule of the Habsburg monarchy (and, subsequently, the Austrian Empire as well as Austria-Hungary) from 1775 to 1918 (with the border of the Habsburg domains passing just south-east of the town).

During the late 19th century and early 20th century, the town was the third largest in the Duchy of Bukovina, after Cernăuți (German: Czernowitz or Tschernowitz) and Rădăuți (German: Radautz). Throughout this period of time, in the process of the Josephine colonization (German: Josephinische Kolonisation), the Habsburgs and, later on, the Austrians, attracted many German-speaking settlers from abroad to settle down in Bukovina and, implicitly, in contemporary Suceava, then just a small market town. Over the passing of time, these newly arrived German settlers and their descendants became collectively known as Bukovina Germans. This community has since dwindled to a very small number.

Nonetheless, despite their current numbers, the Germans from Suceava are still culturally, socially, and politically active. Given its diverse ethnic background during the late Modern Age, Austrian architect Rudolf Gassauer stated that the town of Suceava could have well been perceived back then as a 'miniature Austria'. Additionally, at that time, on an administrative level, the town of Suceava was part of a namesake bezirk (i.e. district) with a total population of 66,826 inhabitants.

In 1918, the town of Suceava (as well as the entire region of Bukovina) became part of the enlarged and unified Kingdom of Romania (and what is known in Romanian historiography as Greater Romania), after an overwhelming vote of the German, Romanian, and Polish representatives of the General Congress of Bukovina. All 7 political representatives of the Bukovina Germans led by Alois Lebouton voted for the union of Bukovina with the Kingdom of Romania.

=== Kingdom of Romania, communist period, and 21st-century history ===
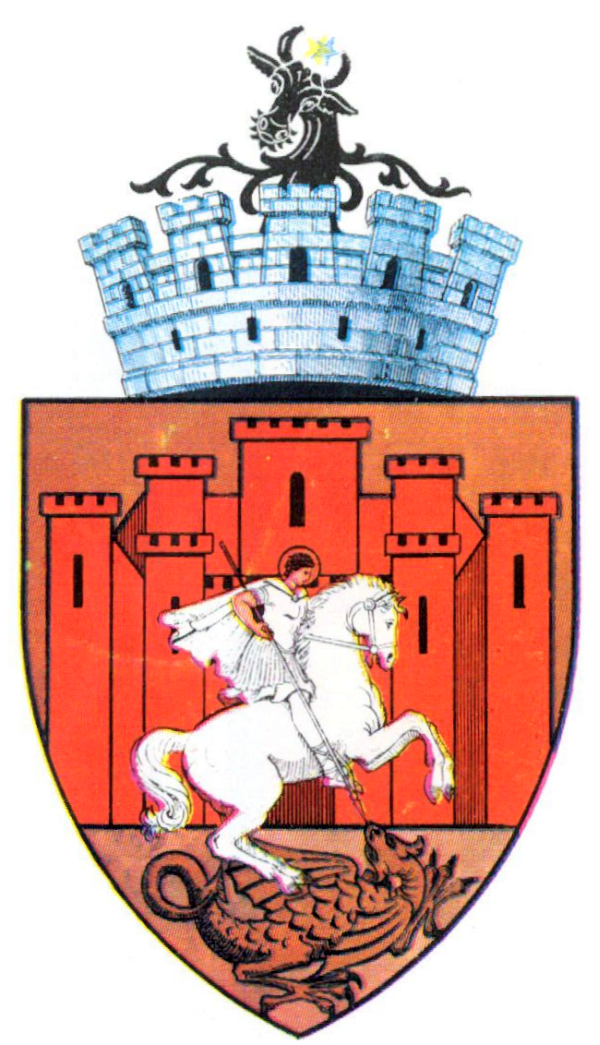
The interwar coat of arms of the municipality of Suceava during the Kingdom of Romania

Throughout the interwar period, Suceava underwent further infrastructural development within the then enlarged Kingdom of Romania (Romanian: Regatul României). Moreover, from an administrative point of view, it had also briefly belonged to Ținutul Suceava (between 1938 and 1940), one of the 10 lands established during King Carol II's reign.

In addition, the town had previously had sizeable German, Jewish, and Polish ethnic communities which gradually dramatically dwindled throughout both the late 20th century and early 21st century. However, various ethnic groups are still present in smaller numbers nowadays and are socially, culturally, and politically active and mostly well integrated through their representative institutions (e.g. Dom Polski for the Polish community, the local headquarters of the Union of the Ukrainians of Romania for the Ukrainian community, the Association of Italians of Romania established in the city in 1993 for the Italian community, or the local branch of the Democratic Forum of Germans for the German community). With regard to the Jewish population, according to Encyclopaedia Judaica: "The local Jews were persecuted by the Nazi German and Romanian authorities between 1940 and 1941. When deported to Transnistria in 1941, they numbered 3,253. Only 27 remained in the town." The total nunber of Jews deported to Transnistria from Suceava County in October 1941 was 5,942. A Romanian official document from 1946 suggests that most Jews in Suceava County survived the Holocaust. The broader context is that 70% or more than 70% of the southern Bukovinian Jews deported to Transnistria survived the ordeal. On March 14, 1944, Romania's military dictator Ion Antonescu allowed the repatriation of all the Jews deported to Transnistria.

Subsequently, from the 1950s onwards (concomitantly with the rise of communism in Romania), Suceava was heavily industrialized and a significant series of historical buildings from its historical centre (including the entire Franz Josef Straße) were demolished for Plattenbau-like blocks of flats to be constructed at the orders of the former communist officials.

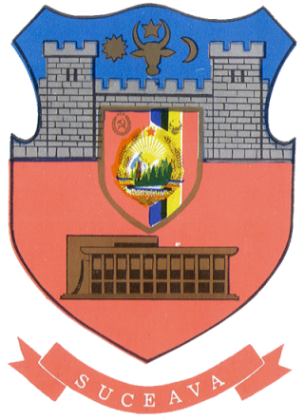
The coat of arms of the municipality of Suceava during communist times

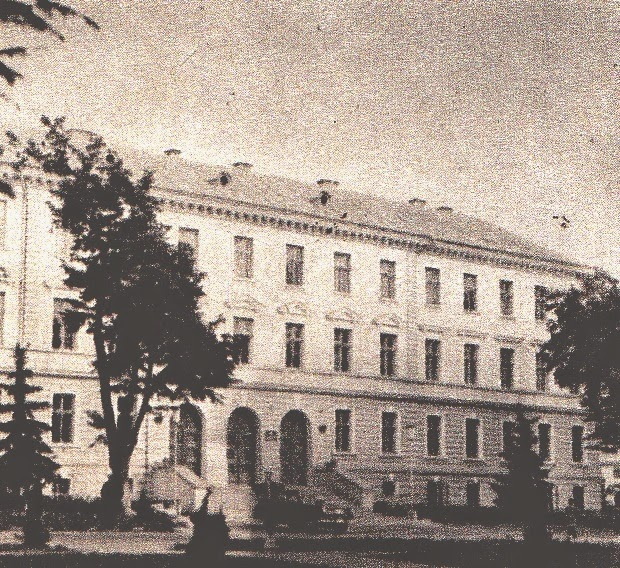
The Justice Palace in Suceava, photographed at some point during the communist period. The building served as town hall between 1968 and 2002.

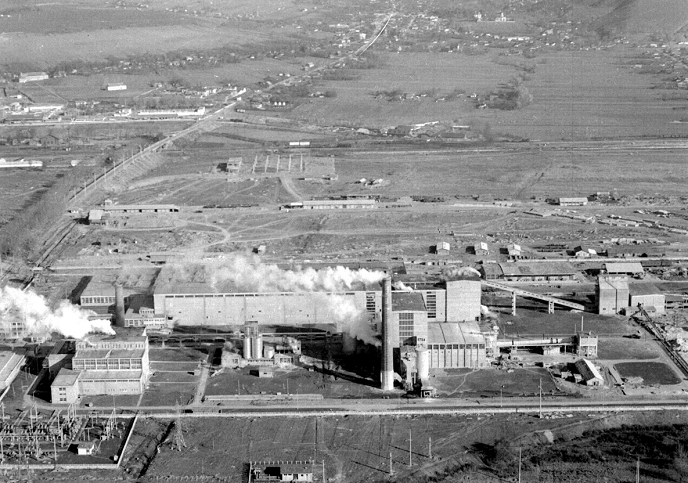
Suceava valley industrial platform, bird's-eye view taken at some point during the 1960s.

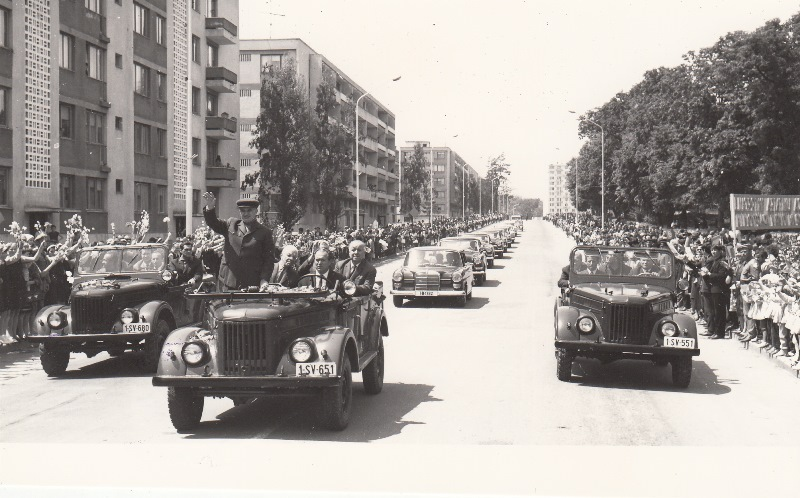
Former communist dictator Nicolae Ceaușescu visiting Suceava in 1970.

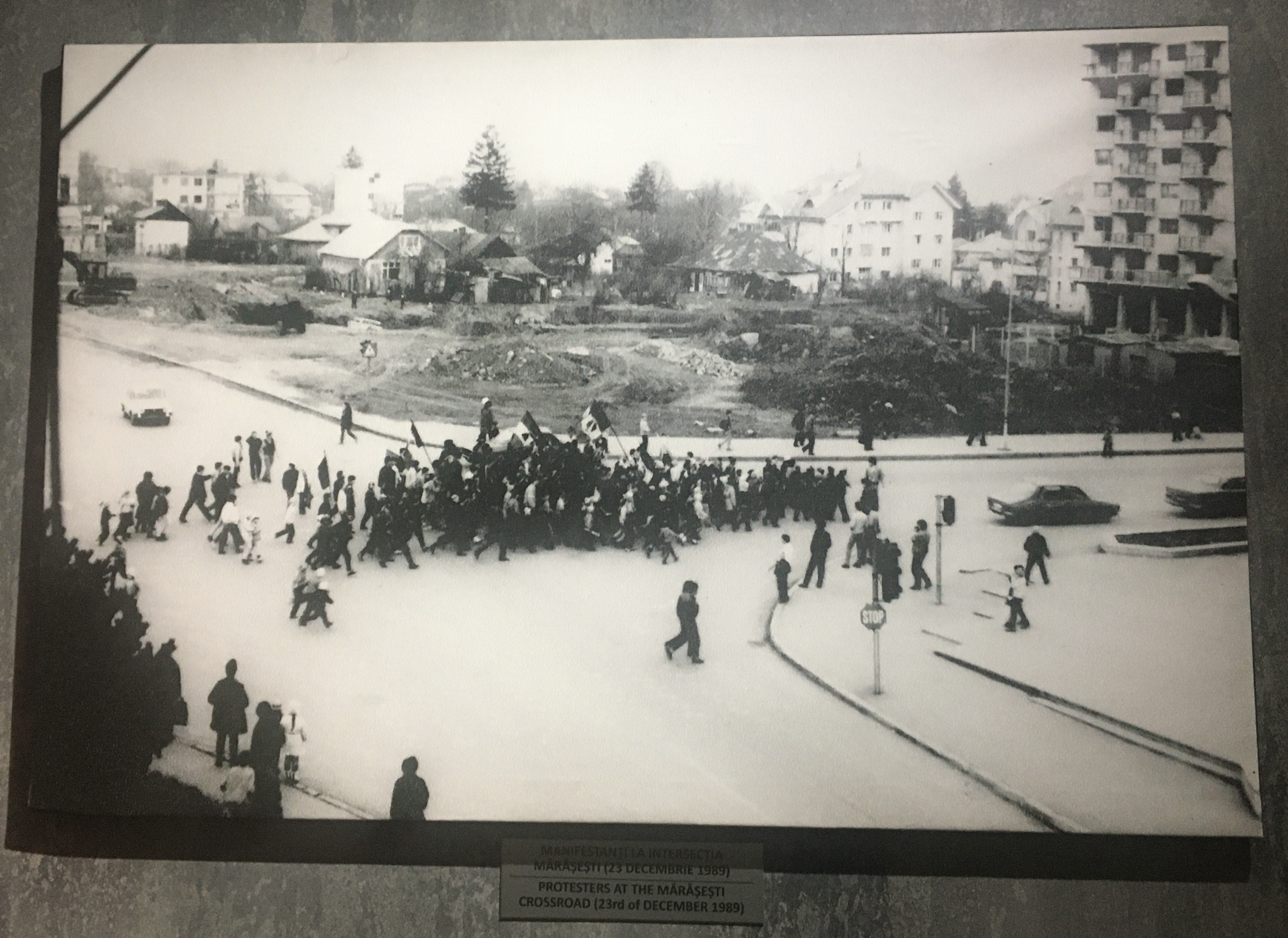
Protesters demonstrating in Suceava during the 1989 Romanian revolution.

After the 1989 Romanian revolution, the town had increasingly lost both a significant amount of its population and its former industry which was forged mainly during communism. Therefore, its local economy entered a period of decline for many years. During the early 21st century, Suceava's population raised above 100,000 inhabitants according to official Romanian census data and estimates, but then went into decline again as per the latest census from 2021. At the same time, both economic development and revitalisation took place as well since 1999 onwards. Eventually, Suceava attracted investors to such an extent that it became the city with the highest density of modern commercial spaces per capita in Romania. Additionally, Suceava represents an urban development pole in the North-East development region.

During spring 2020, shortly after the COVID-19 pandemic in Romania began, Suceava was placed under lockdown due to its high rate of infection. The following year, the roof of the Administrative Palace was severely damaged by fire. In March 2022, the government of Romania approved a renovation plan for the entire building. In early 2026, the building was already fully renovated, as it can be seen in the mini-gallery below.

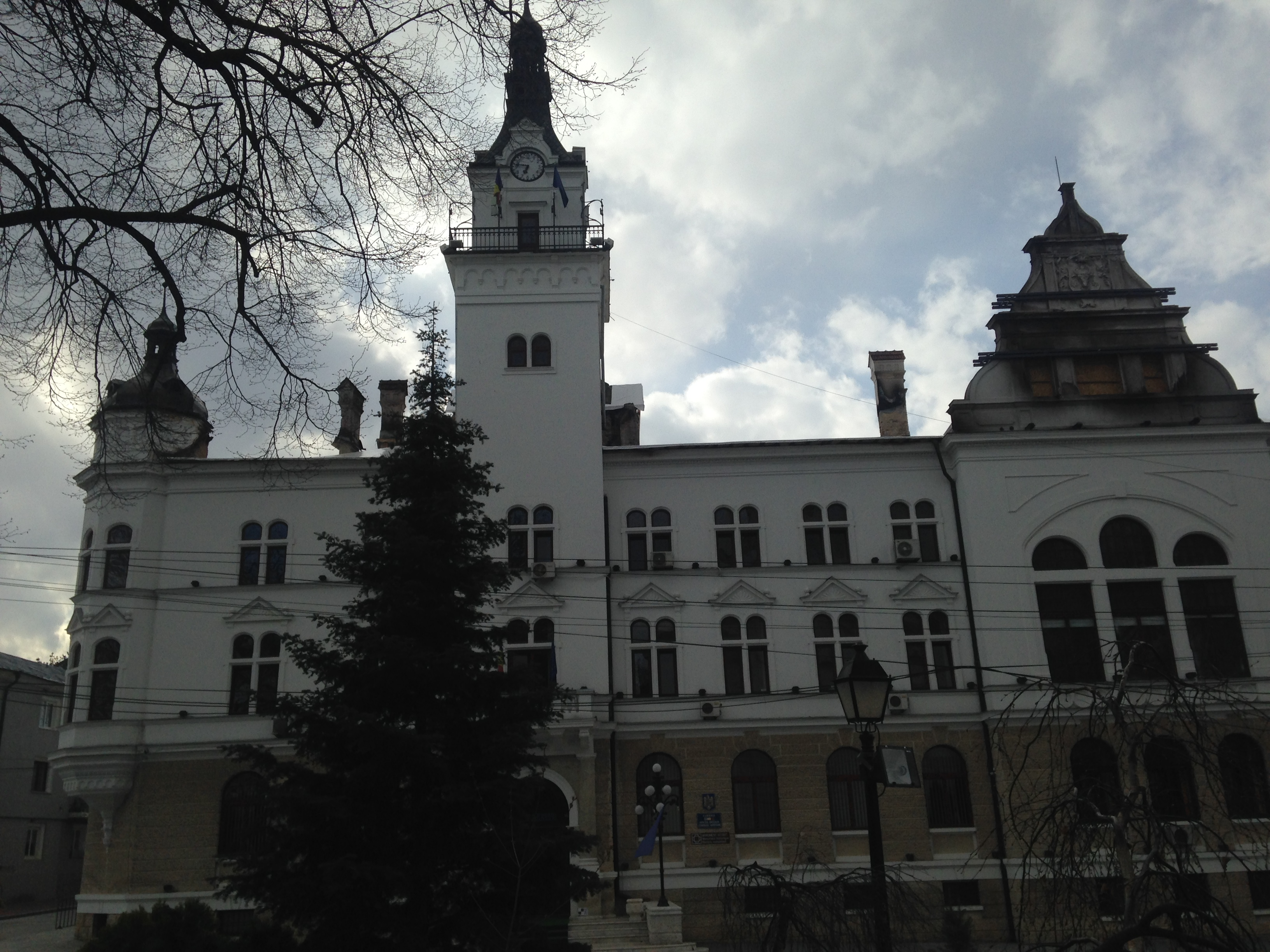
The Administrative Palace of Suceava, as seen in April 2021, after the fire which caught its roof in March 2021.

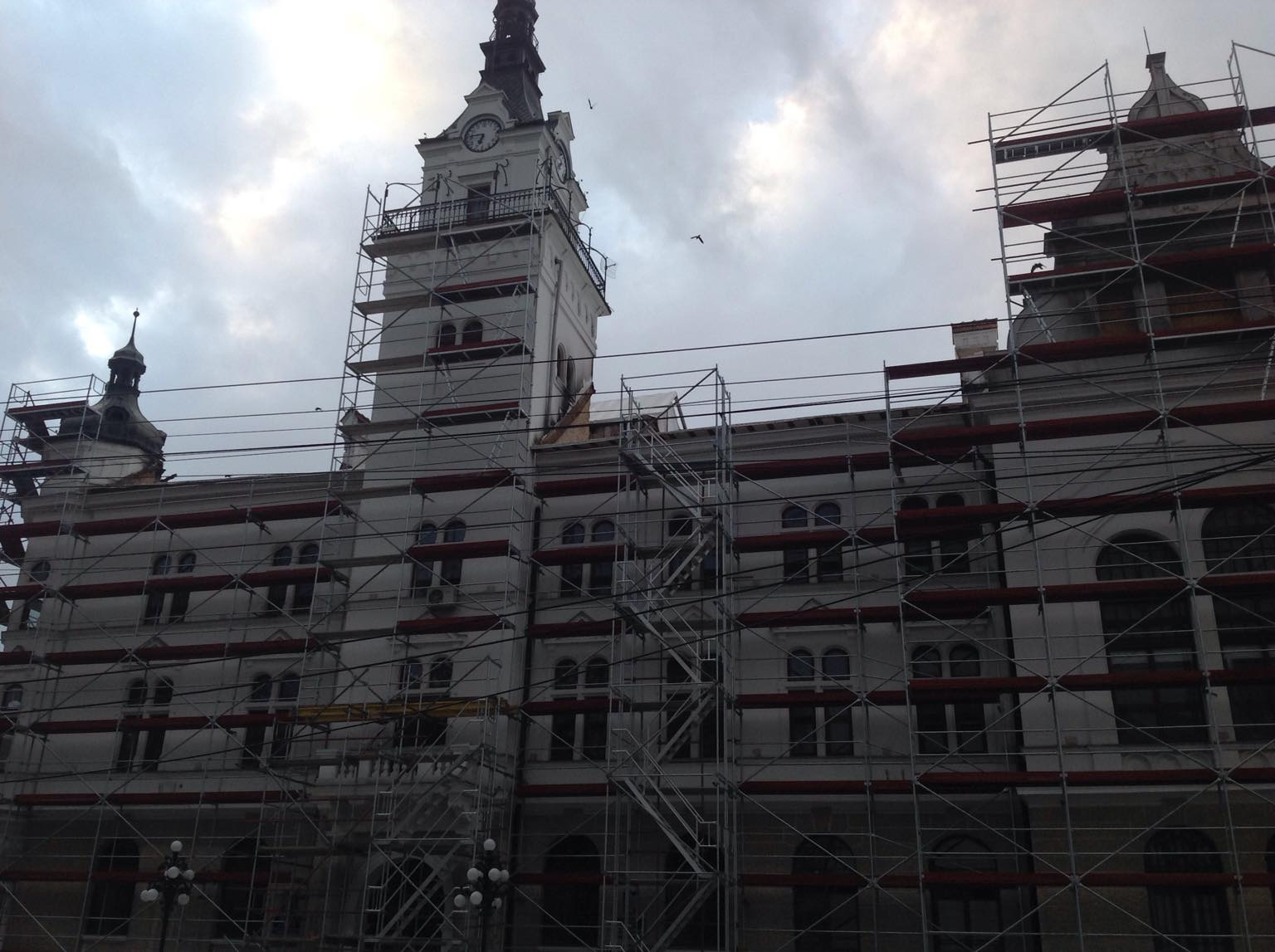
The Suceava Administrative Palace photographed in early January 2023, undergoing renovation works after the March 2021 fire.

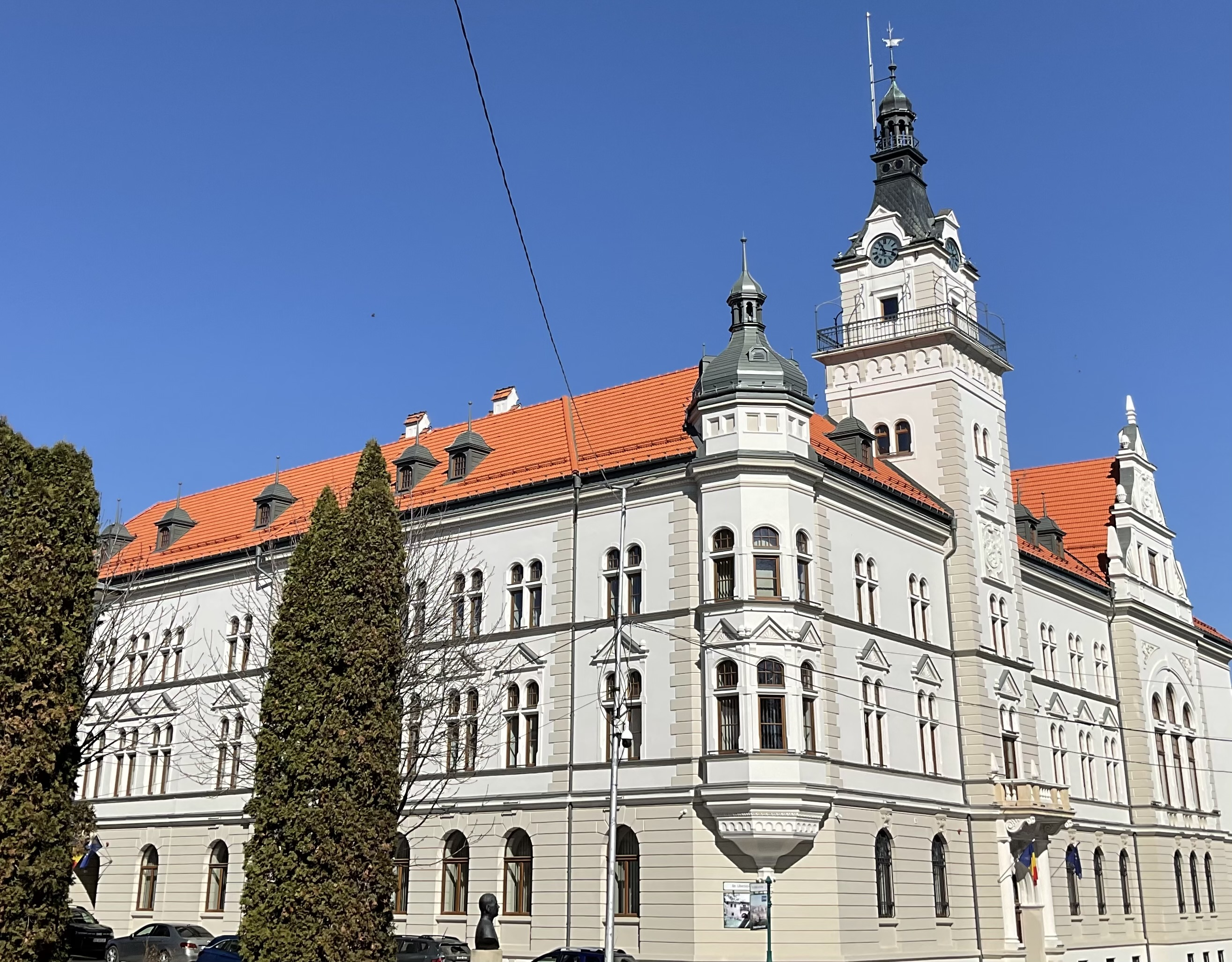
The Administrative Palace of Suceava (as seen in March, 2026)

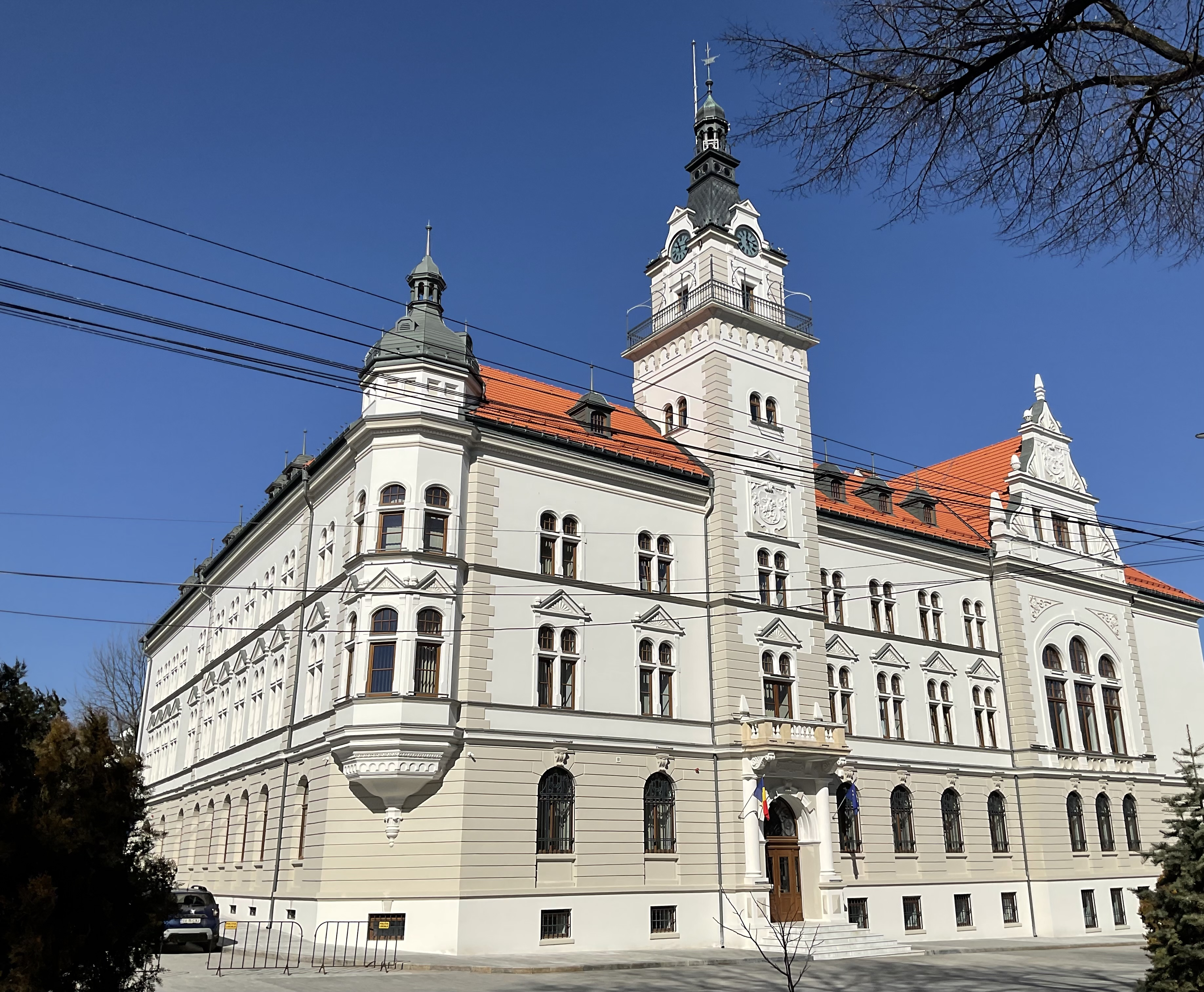
The Administrative Palace of Suceava (as seen in March, 2026)

The Chamber of Accounts in Suceava, as seen in August 2022.

== Geography ==
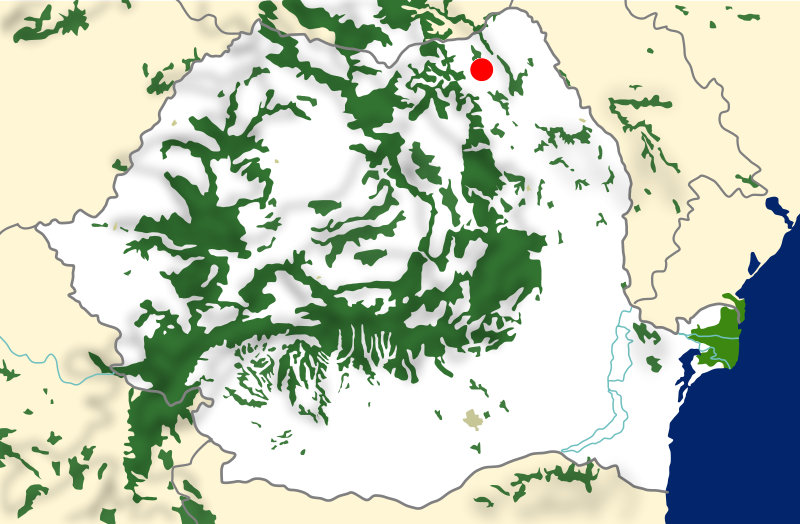
The location of Suceava in northeastern Romania

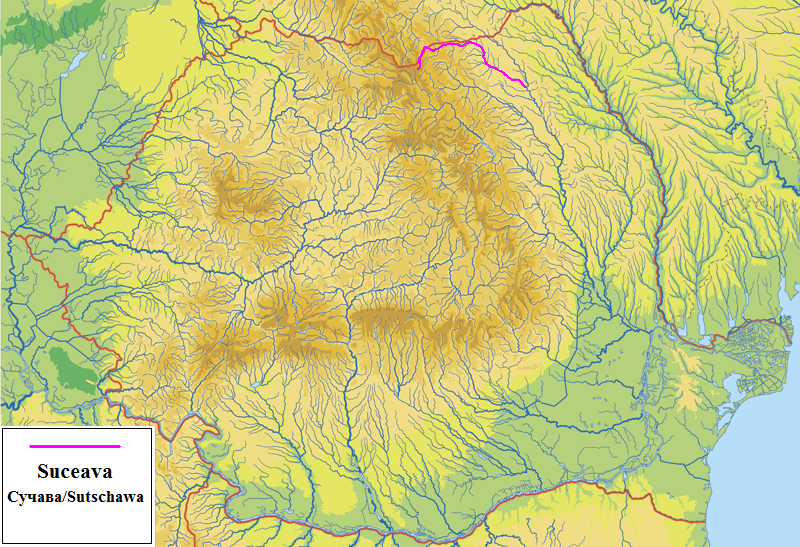
Map depicting the course of the Suceava river

Suceava is situated in the south-western part of the Suceava County, in a moderately hilly area, and is an important commercial town and regional transport hub with Ukraine to the north, on the one hand, and with Transylvania to the west on the other hand.

The town of Suceava covers two types of geographical areas, the hills (of which the highest is Zamca Hill) and the meadows of the Suceava river valley. Its setting includes two groves, Zamca and Șipote, which are both located within the town's limits.

Burdujeni, one of the town's neighbourhoods, is connected to the rest of the town by a prominent avenue, which makes the neighbourhood appear as a separate satellite town.

Suceava is also crossed by Mitocu and Dragomirna rivers in Ițcani.

== Climate ==
The town of Suceava has a temperate continental climate which is typical to Central and Eastern Europe. In addition, the yearly weather can be described with short springs, usually moderately warm summers as well as prolonged autumns and winters.

Climate data for Suceava (1991–2020, extremes 1981–present)
Month	Jan	Feb	Mar	Apr	May	Jun	Jul	Aug	Sep	Oct	Nov	Dec	Year
Record high °C (°F)	20.4 (68.7)	24.3 (75.7)	27.4 (81.3)	32.0 (89.6)	34.5 (94.1)	36.0 (96.8)	36.7 (98.1)	38.6 (101.5)	35.6 (96.1)	32.0 (89.6)	24.0 (75.2)	18.0 (64.4)	38.6 (101.5)
Mean daily maximum °C (°F)	0.8 (33.4)	2.8 (37.0)	8.1 (46.6)	15.0 (59.0)	20.6 (69.1)	23.9 (75.0)	25.9 (78.6)	25.7 (78.3)	20.4 (68.7)	14.4 (57.9)	7.5 (45.5)	2.1 (35.8)	13.9 (57.0)
Daily mean °C (°F)	−2.8 (27.0)	−1.4 (29.5)	2.8 (37.0)	9.1 (48.4)	14.6 (58.3)	18.2 (64.8)	19.9 (67.8)	19.3 (66.7)	14.3 (57.7)	8.8 (47.8)	3.3 (37.9)	−1.3 (29.7)	8.7 (47.7)
Mean daily minimum °C (°F)	−6.0 (21.2)	−4.8 (23.4)	−1.1 (30.0)	4.1 (39.4)	9.1 (48.4)	12.9 (55.2)	14.4 (57.9)	13.9 (57.0)	9.6 (49.3)	4.7 (40.5)	0.1 (32.2)	−4.4 (24.1)	4.4 (39.9)
Record low °C (°F)	−27.3 (−17.1)	−29.8 (−21.6)	−20.2 (−4.4)	−8.2 (17.2)	−2.2 (28.0)	3.4 (38.1)	5.5 (41.9)	4.2 (39.6)	−0.6 (30.9)	−7.7 (18.1)	−19.5 (−3.1)	−29.8 (−21.6)	−29.8 (−21.6)
Average precipitation mm (inches)	19.0 (0.75)	21.0 (0.83)	30.4 (1.20)	45.7 (1.80)	72.0 (2.83)	98.3 (3.87)	102.4 (4.03)	65.9 (2.59)	52.4 (2.06)	42.8 (1.69)	28.5 (1.12)	23.8 (0.94)	602.2 (23.71)
Average precipitation days (≥ 1.0 mm)	5.1	5.5	6.7	7.5	9.9	10.4	10.1	7.4	6.6	6.1	5.5	5.7	86.5
Mean monthly sunshine hours	79.4	94.6	138.8	180.7	240.4	239.6	263.4	254.9	185.5	145.1	87.7	70.6	1,980.7
Source 1: NOAA
Source 2: Meteomanz (extremes since 2021)

Climate data for Suceava (2002–2015)
Month	Jan	Feb	Mar	Apr	May	Jun	Jul	Aug	Sep	Oct	Nov	Dec	Year
Record high °C (°F)	15.7 (60.3)	19.2 (66.6)	22.0 (71.6)	30.5 (86.9)	31.2 (88.2)	34.5 (94.1)	36.0 (96.8)	37.1 (98.8)	35.6 (96.1)	28.2 (82.8)	22.9 (73.2)	17.1 (62.8)	37.1 (98.8)
Mean daily maximum °C (°F)	0.5 (32.9)	1.6 (34.9)	8.2 (46.8)	15.0 (59.0)	21.3 (70.3)	23.9 (75.0)	26.2 (79.2)	25.6 (78.1)	20.6 (69.1)	14.2 (57.6)	8.6 (47.5)	2.6 (36.7)	14.0 (57.3)
Daily mean °C (°F)	−3.1 (26.4)	−2.3 (27.9)	2.8 (37.0)	9.1 (48.4)	15.2 (59.4)	18.2 (64.8)	20.3 (68.5)	19.4 (66.9)	14.5 (58.1)	8.6 (47.5)	4.2 (39.6)	−1.0 (30.2)	8.8 (47.9)
Mean daily minimum °C (°F)	−6.4 (20.5)	−5.5 (22.1)	−1.3 (29.7)	4.0 (39.2)	9.6 (49.3)	12.8 (55.0)	14.8 (58.6)	14.1 (57.4)	9.7 (49.5)	4.3 (39.7)	0.7 (33.3)	−4.2 (24.4)	4.4 (39.9)
Record low °C (°F)	−24.7 (−12.5)	−28.6 (−19.5)	−16.9 (1.6)	−8.2 (17.2)	−1.1 (30.0)	5.0 (41.0)	6.8 (44.2)	7.1 (44.8)	−0.6 (30.9)	−7.7 (18.1)	−10.1 (13.8)	−21.3 (−6.3)	−28.6 (−19.5)
Average precipitation mm (inches)	21.9 (0.86)	22.0 (0.87)	32.9 (1.30)	48.7 (1.92)	72.8 (2.87)	94.3 (3.71)	131.9 (5.19)	80.9 (3.19)	41.4 (1.63)	40.2 (1.58)	24.2 (0.95)	20.4 (0.80)	631.6 (24.87)
Average precipitation days (≥ 1.0 mm)	5.6	5.8	6.8	7.3	9.2	10.5	10.3	7.2	6.1	6	4.9	5.4	85.1
Mean daily sunshine hours	2.4	3.1	4.9	6.3	7.9	8.1	8.7	8.3	6.5	4.7	3	2.5	5.5
Source: Deutscher Wetterdienst

== Demographics ==
=== Historical data for the town proper ===
Historical population
Year	Pop.	±%
1869	7,450	—
1880	10,104	+35.6%
1890	10,221	+1.2%
1900	10,955	+7.2%
1912	11,229	+2.5%
1918	10,200	−9.2%
1930	17,028	+66.9%
1941	13,744	−19.3%
1948	10,123	−26.3%
1956	20,949	+106.9%
1966	37,697	+79.9%
1977	62,715	+66.4%
1992	114,462	+82.5%
2002	106,138	−7.3%
2011	92,121	−13.2%
2016	116,404	+26.4%
2018	124,161	+6.7%
2022	84,308	−32.1%
2023	119,694	+42.0%
Source: Austrian and Romanian census data and/or official estimates Source for the 2022 data: official Romanian census data Source for the 2023 data: National Institute of Statistics (INS)

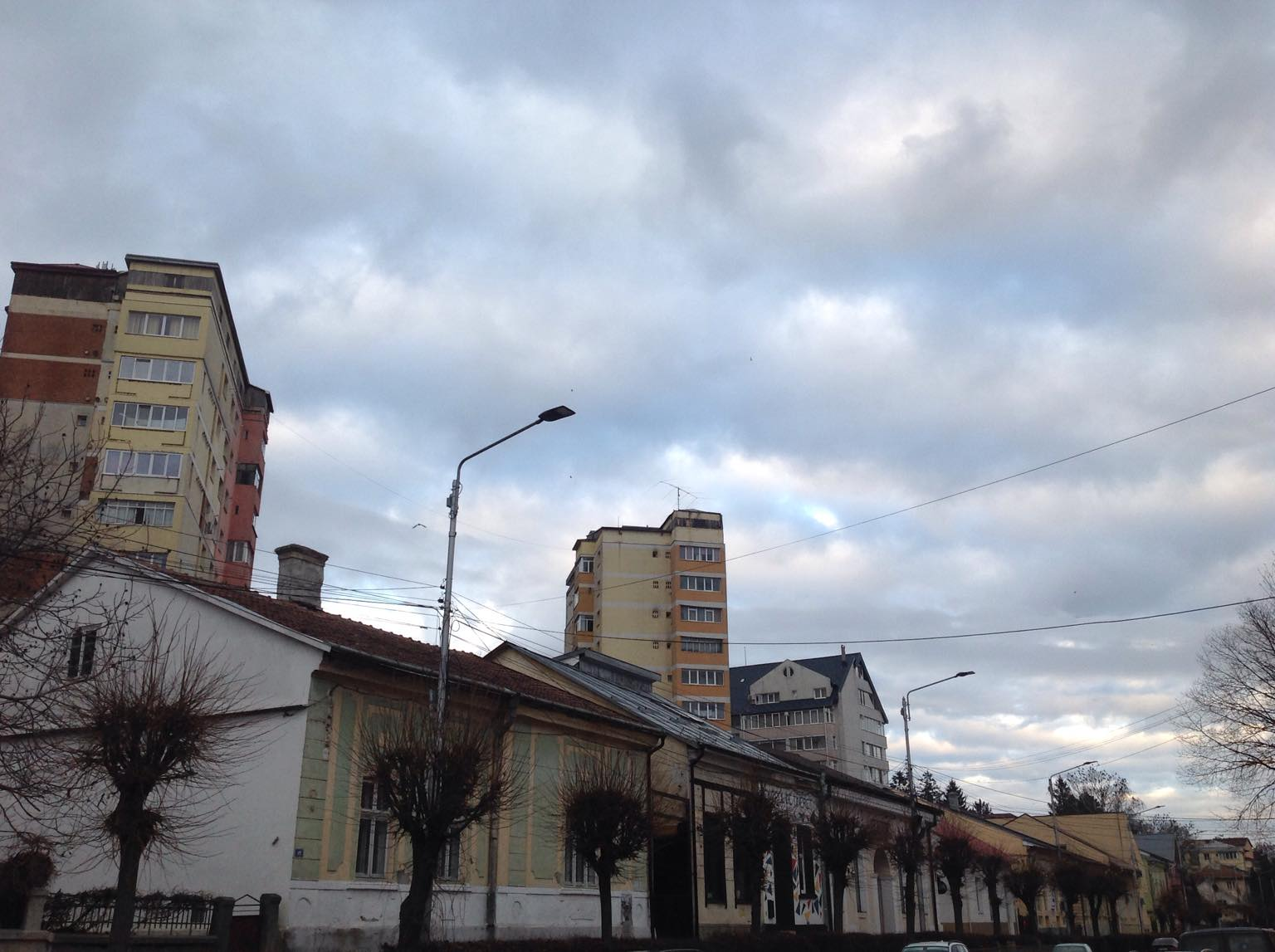
Old historical houses in Suceava's downtown, as seen in early January 2023. Urban legend has it that their cellars have underground tunnels leading to the medieval seat fortress.

The Austrian census of 1869, which recorded only population in absolute numbers (bereft of ethnicity or religion), indicated that then small town of Suceava had a total population of 7,450 permanent inhabitants. The Austrian census of 1880 indicated that the town of Suceava had a total population of 10,104, of which 5,862 were Germans (i.e. Bukovina Germans), 2,652 Romanians, 441 Ruthenians, and 784 inhabitants belonging to other ethnic groups.

The Austrian census of 1890 indicated that the town of Suceava had a total population of 10,221, of which 5,965 were Germans (i.e. Bukovina Germans), 2,417 Romanians, 644 Ruthenians, and 905 inhabitants belonging to other ethnic groups.

In 1900, when the town was still under Imperial Austrian administration, its total population amounted to 10,955 inhabitants. Of those, 61.5% declared their native language to be German (i.e. Hochdeutsch), followed by Romanian with 25.38%, and Ruthenian (or Ukrainian) with 5.46%. In 1918, when Bukovina became part of the enlarged Kingdom of Romania (also known as Greater Romania during the interwar period), the population of Suceava amounted to 10,200 citizens. 20 years later, when the town had already switched to the Kingdom of Romania, the 1930 Romanian census recorded a population that amounted to c. 17,000 inhabitants with the following ethno-linguistic composition:

- Romanians: 61.5%
- Jews: 18.7%
- Germans (i.e. Bukovina Germans): 13.9%
- Poles: 2.6%
- Other ethnic groups (most notably Lipovans, Ukrainians, Hungarians, and Armenians): 3.3%

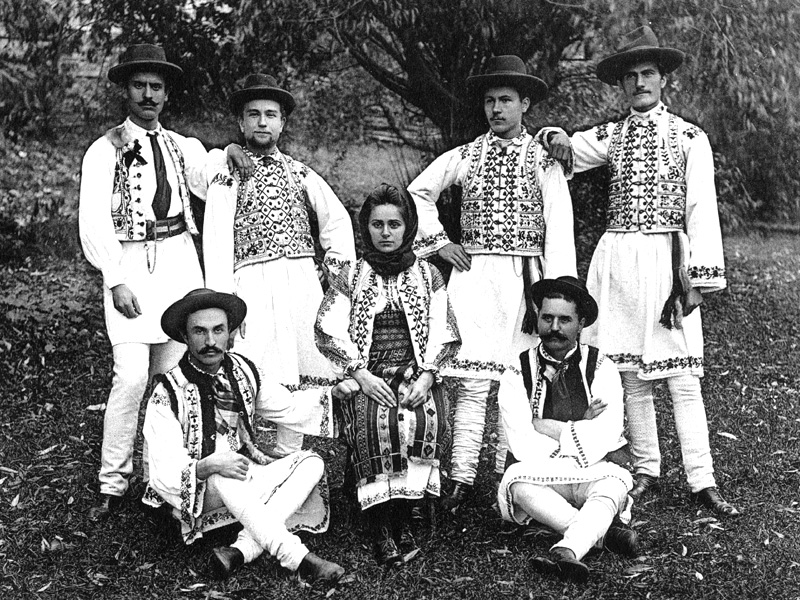
Romanians in national costumes from Suceava during the early 20th century (then still part of Austria-Hungary).

Another census was conducted in the Kingdom of Romania during World War II, namely in 1941, which recorded a total population of 13,744 inhabitants for the town of Suceava. The ethnic composition of the town at that time was the following one:

- Romanians: 8,823 (or 64.19%)
- Germans (i.e. Bukovina Germans): 709 (5.15%)
- Hungarians: 28 (or 0.20%)
- Other minority ethnic groups or undeclared: 4,184 (or 30.44%)

The population of the town of Suceava in 1941
Romanians	64.19%
Germans (Bukovina Germans)	5.15%
Hungarians	0.2%
Others	30.44%

Therefore, the then remaining German community of the town became the second-largest declared ethnic group even after the vast majority of the Bukovina Germans were forcefully resettled by the Nazi German authorities to former Nazi-occupied Poland (or the former General Governorate for the Occupied Polish Region) one year earlier in 1940, as part of the Heim ins Reich population transfer plan.

Shortly after the end of World War II, the ethnic minorities (mainly Germans and Jews but also Poles) considerably and gradually dwindled in the town of Suceava. However, as during communism, the overall population of the town raised (as it was the general case of other cities and towns in Romania as well as the country's total population given the pro-natalist policies of the Ceaușescu regime). After the 1989 Romanian Revolution, the population of Suceava fell once more due to constant emigration both abroad or to other more developed towns and cities across Romania.

The population of the town of Suceava in 2002
Romanians	98.17%
Roma	0.48%
Germans (Bukovina Germans)	0.35%
Ukrainians	0.27%
Poles	0.23%
Lipovans	0.20%
Others	0.30%

According to the 2002 Romanian census, the ethnic structure of the town of Suceava can be divided into distinct groups as follows:

- Romanians: 98.17%
- Roma (Gypsies): 0.48%
- Germans (i.e. Bukovina Germans): 0.35%
- Ukrainians: 0.27%
- Poles: 0.23%
- Lipovans: 0.20%
- Other ethnic groups (most notably Hungarians, Jews, and Armenians): 0.30%

The population of the town of Suceava in 2011
Romanians	98.3%
Roma	0.7%
Ukrainians	0.3%
Germans (Bukovina Germans)	0.2%
Others	0.5%

According to the 2011 census data, Suceava had a population of 92,121, a decrease from the figure recorded at the 2002 census (106,138), making it the 23rd largest urban settlement in Romania at that time. Additionally, the ethnic composition was as follows:

- Romanians: 98.3%
- Roma (Gypsies): 0.7%
- Ukrainians: 0.3%
- Germans (i.e. Bukovina Germans): 0.2%
- Poles: 0.1%
- Lipovans: 0.1%
- Other ethnic groups (most notably Hungarians, Jews, and Armenians): 0.3%

The population of the town of Suceava in 2021
Romanians	80.72%
Roma	0.62%
Ukrainians	0.15%
Lipovans	0.11%
Germans (Bukovina Germans)	0.11%
Others	0.26%
Undeclared	18.02%

According to the 2021 census data (conducted in 2022 due to the COVID-19 pandemic), Suceava had a population of 84,322, a decrease from the figure recorded at the 2011 census, making it the 22nd most populous municipality in Romania at that time. Furthermore, ethnically, the population of the municipality can be divided as follows:

- Romanians: 80.72%
- Romani people: 0.62%
- Ukrainians: 0.15%
- Lipovan Russians: 0.11%
- Germans (i.e. Bukovina Germans): 0.11%
- Poles: 0.09%
- Other ethnicities or ethnic minorities: 0.17%
- Undeclared (presumably Romanian): 18.02%

=== Historical data for the Ițcani neighborhood ===
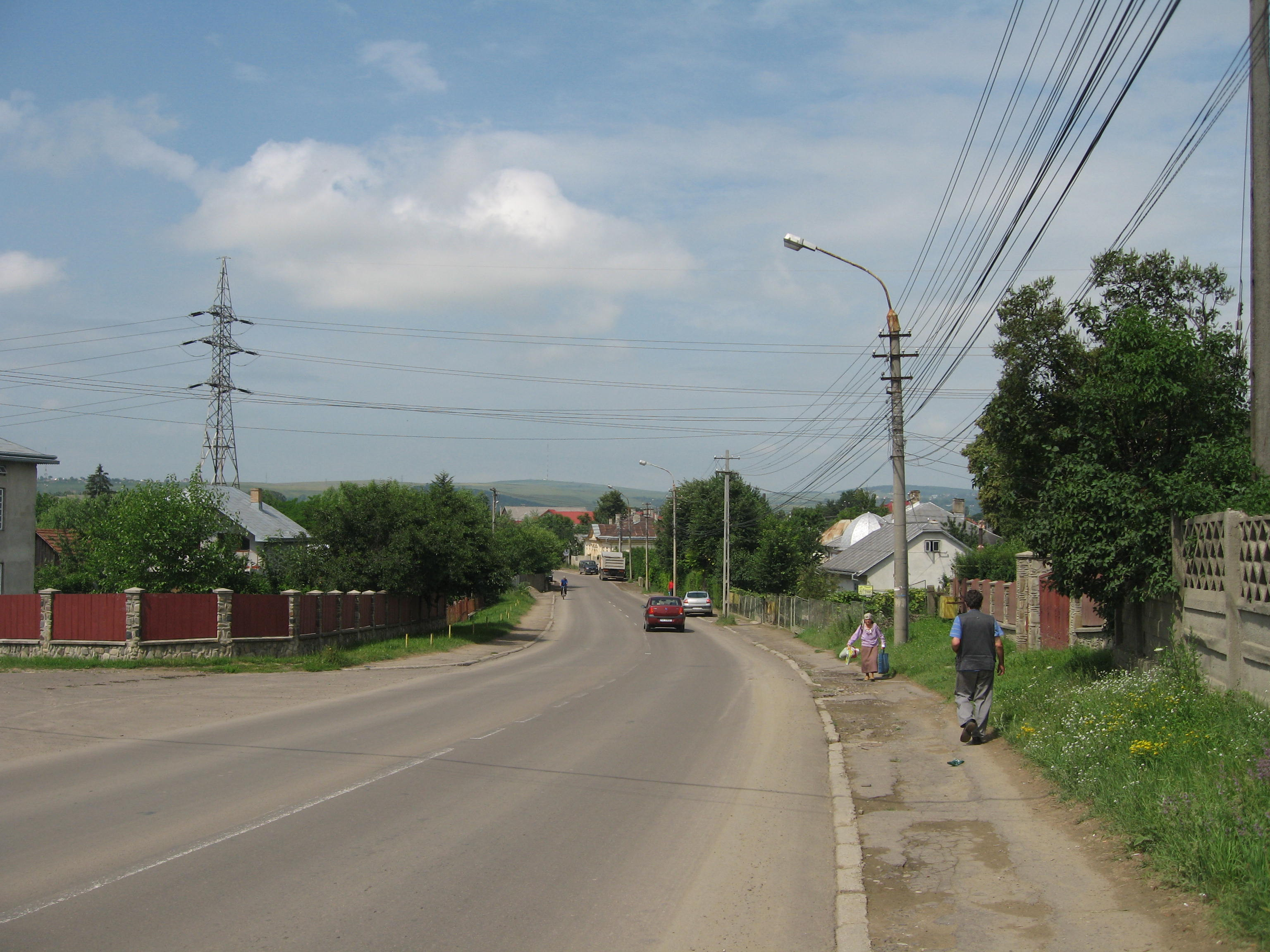
Gheorghe Doja street from the Ițcani neighborhood, situated northwest of the town proper.

According to the 1930 Romanian census, the population of present-day Ițcani neighborhood, which, at the time, was considered a separate commune comprising two villages, namely Ițcanii Noi (German: Neu Itzkany) and Ițcani Gară (German: Itzkany Bahnhof), amounted to 2,422 residents. By ethnic criterion, those residents were:

- Germans (i.e. Bukovina Germans): 45%
- Romanians: 21.40%
- Jews: 17.84%
- Ukrainians: 6.77%
- Poles: 5.24%
- Russians (i.e. Lipovans): 2.15%
- Hungarians: 1.53%
- Other minor ethnic groups (forming the remainder of 0.07%)

In religious terms, 28.4% of the then residents were Roman Catholic, 22.7% were Evangelical Lutheran, 22.04% were Orthodox, 18.04% belonged to Judaism, 8.17% were Greek Catholic, and the rest either belonged to other smaller cults or were irreligious.

== Administration and local politics ==
The renovated town hall of Suceava at dusk in late April 2021

=== List of mayors (1990–present) ===
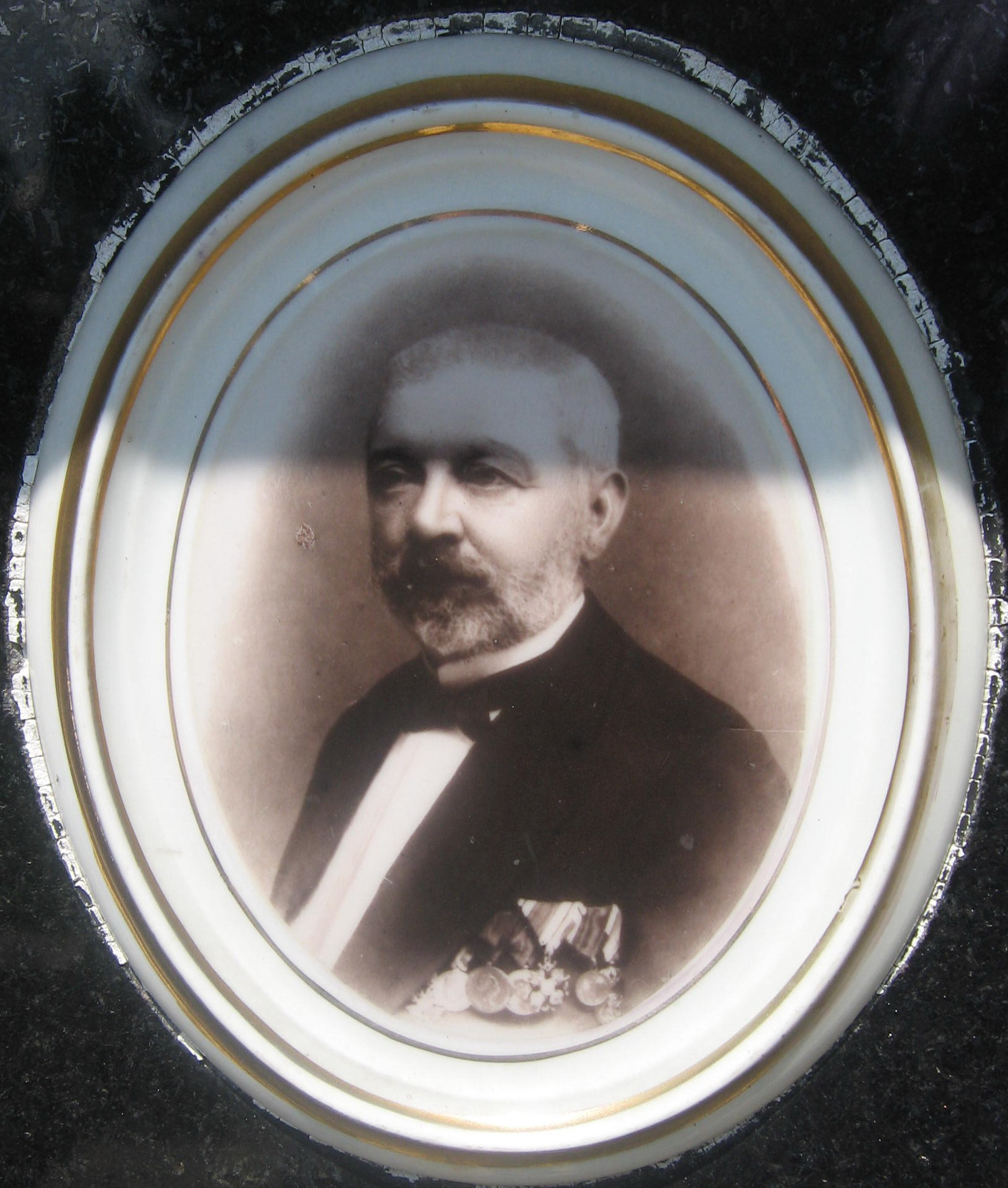
Former Austrian-born mayor Franz Des Loges (of Swiss-French origin) is credited with modernising the city as well as developing its culture and infrastructure during his term (1891–1914).

The mayors elected since Romania's transition back to democracy and a free market economy in the wake of the 1989 Romanian Revolution have been the following ones:

Nº	Name	Term start	Term end	Political party
1	Filaret Poenaru	1990	1992	National Salvation Front (FSN)
2	Gheorghe Toma	1992	1996	Romanian Ecologist Party (PER)
3	Constantin Sofroni	1996	2000	National Liberal Party (PNL)^{1}
4	Marian Ionescu	2000	2004	Social Democratic Party (PSD)
5	Ion Lungu	2004	2024	National Liberal Party (PNL)^{2}
6	Vasile Rîmbu	2024	present	Social Democratic Party (PSD)

Notes:

^{1} Initially elected on the lists of the Democratic Agrarian Party of Romania (PDAR) but subsequently switched to the National Liberal Party (PNL).
^{2} Initially elected on the lists of the National Liberal Party (PNL), subsequently switched to the Democratic Liberal Party (PDL), then re-elected on the lists of the PNL

=== Town council ===
==== 1992–1996 ====
Following the 1992 Romanian local elections, the first such type of elections in post-1989 Romania, the town had a new local council.

==== 1996–2000 ====
The town's former local council for the period 1996–2000 had the following multi-party political composition, based on the results of the votes cast at the 1996 Romanian local elections:

Party	Seats	Current Council
Romanian Democratic Convention (CDR)	4	
Social Democratic Union (USD) (Note: Electoral alliance consisting of the Democratic Party (PD) and the Romanian Social Democratic Party (PSDR).)	4	
Party of Social Democracy of Romania (PDSR)	3	
Democratic Agrarian Party (PDAR)	3	
Civic Alliance Party (PAC)	1	
Greater Romania Party (PRM)	1	
Socialist Party of Labour (PSM)	1	
Ecological Movement of Romania (MER)	1	
National Democratic Christian Party (PNDC)	1	
Pensioners' Party (PP)	1	
Liberal Party 1993 (PL '93)	1	
Democratic Pensioners' Party From Romania And Diaspora (PDPRD)	1	
National Drivers' Party (PNAR)	1	
Romanian National Unity Party (PUNR)	1	
Democratic Noncommunists' Party in Romania (PDNR)	1	

==== 2000–2004 ====
The town's former local council for the period 2000–2004 had the following multi-party political composition, based on the results of the votes cast at the 2000 Romanian local elections:

Party	Seats	Current Council
Party of Social Democracy in Romania (PDSR)	8	
Democratic Party (PD)	4	
Greater Romania Party (PRM)	4	
Alliance for Romania (ApR)	3	
Romanian Democratic Convention (CDR 2000)	3	
National Liberal Party (PNL)	3	

==== 2004–2008 ====
The town's former local council for the period 2004–2008 had the following multi-party political composition, based on the results of the votes cast at the 2004 Romanian local elections:

Party	Seats	Current Council
National Liberal Party (PNL)	8	
Social Democratic Party (PSD)	8	
Humanist Party (PUR)	3	
Democratic Party (PD)	2	
Greater Romania Party (PRM)	2	

==== 2008–2012 ====
The town's former local council for the period 2008–2012 had the following multi-party political composition, based on the results of the votes cast at the 2008 Romanian local elections:

Party	Seats	Current Council
Democratic Liberal Party (PDL)	16	
Social Democratic Party (PSD)	5	
National Liberal Party (PNL)	2	

==== 2012–2016 ====
The town's former local council for the period 2012–2016 had the following multi-party political composition, based on the results of the votes cast at the 2012 Romanian local elections:

Party	Seats	Current Council
Social Liberal Union (USL)	12	
Democratic Liberal Party (PDL)	10	
People's Party – Dan Diaconescu (PP-DD)	1	

==== 2016–2020 ====
The town's former local council for the period 2016–2020 had the following multi-party political composition, based on the results of the votes cast at the 2016 Romanian local elections:

Party	Seats	Current Council
National Liberal Party (PNL)	10	
Social Democratic Party (PSD)	8	
Alliance of Liberals and Democrats (ALDE)	3	
People's Movement Party (PMP)	2	

==== 2020–2024 ====
The town's former local council between 2020 and 2024 had the following multi-party political composition, based on the results of the votes cast at the 2020 Romanian local elections:

Party	Seats	Current Council
National Liberal Party (PNL)	9	
Social Democratic Party (PSD)	5	
People's Movement Party (PMP)	4	
Save Romania Union (USR)	3	
PRO Romania (PRO)	2	

==== 2024–2028 ====
The town's current local council has the following multi-party political composition, based on the results of the votes cast at the 2024 Romanian local elections:

Party	Seats	Current Council
Social Democratic Party (PSD)	10	
National Liberal Party (PNL)	6	
United Right Alliance (ADU)	4	
Alliance for the Union of Romanians (AUR)	3	

== Culture ==
=== The Seat Fortress of Suceava ===
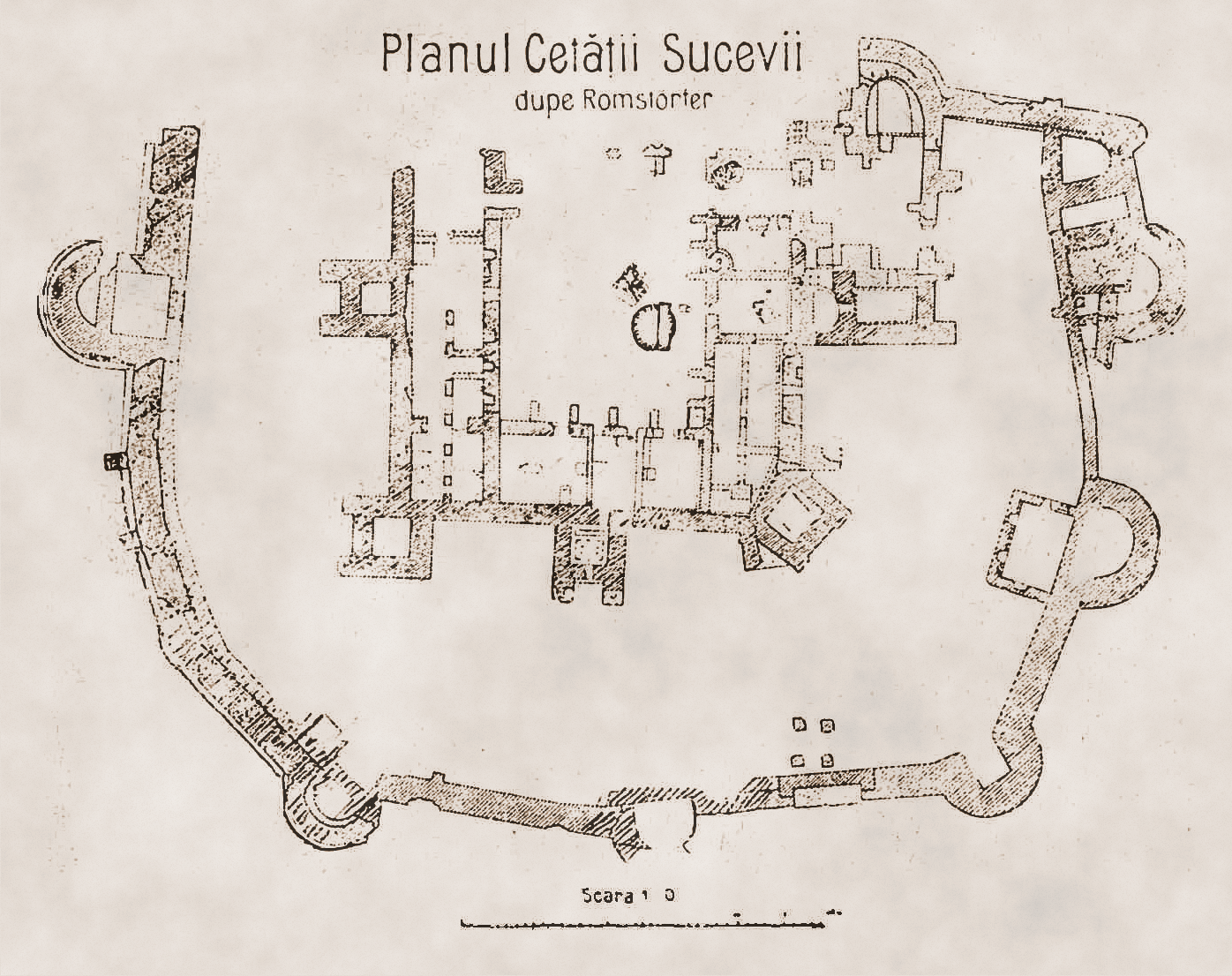
Antiquated image showcasing the plan of Suceava seat fortress according to Austrian architect Karl Adolf Romstorfer (1947).

Suceava is the place of several medieval sites that are closely linked to the history of the former Principality of Moldavia. By far the most significant (and at the same time the most well preserved one) is the Seat Fortress of Suceava (Romanian: Cetatea de Scaun a Sucevei; German: Sotschen Festung) or Suceava Citadel, a medieval castle situated on the eastern edge of the contemporary town.

The fortress was built during the reign of Petru of Moldavia (1375–1391), also known as Petru Mușat. It was further expanded and strengthened during the reigns of Alexander I of Moldavia (1400–1432) and Stephen the Great (1457–1504). The medieval castle was part of the fortification system built in Moldavia during the late 14th century, given the emergence of the expansionist Ottoman danger. It even became strong enough to hold off an attack by Ottoman sultan Mehmed II (the conqueror of Constantinople) in 1476.

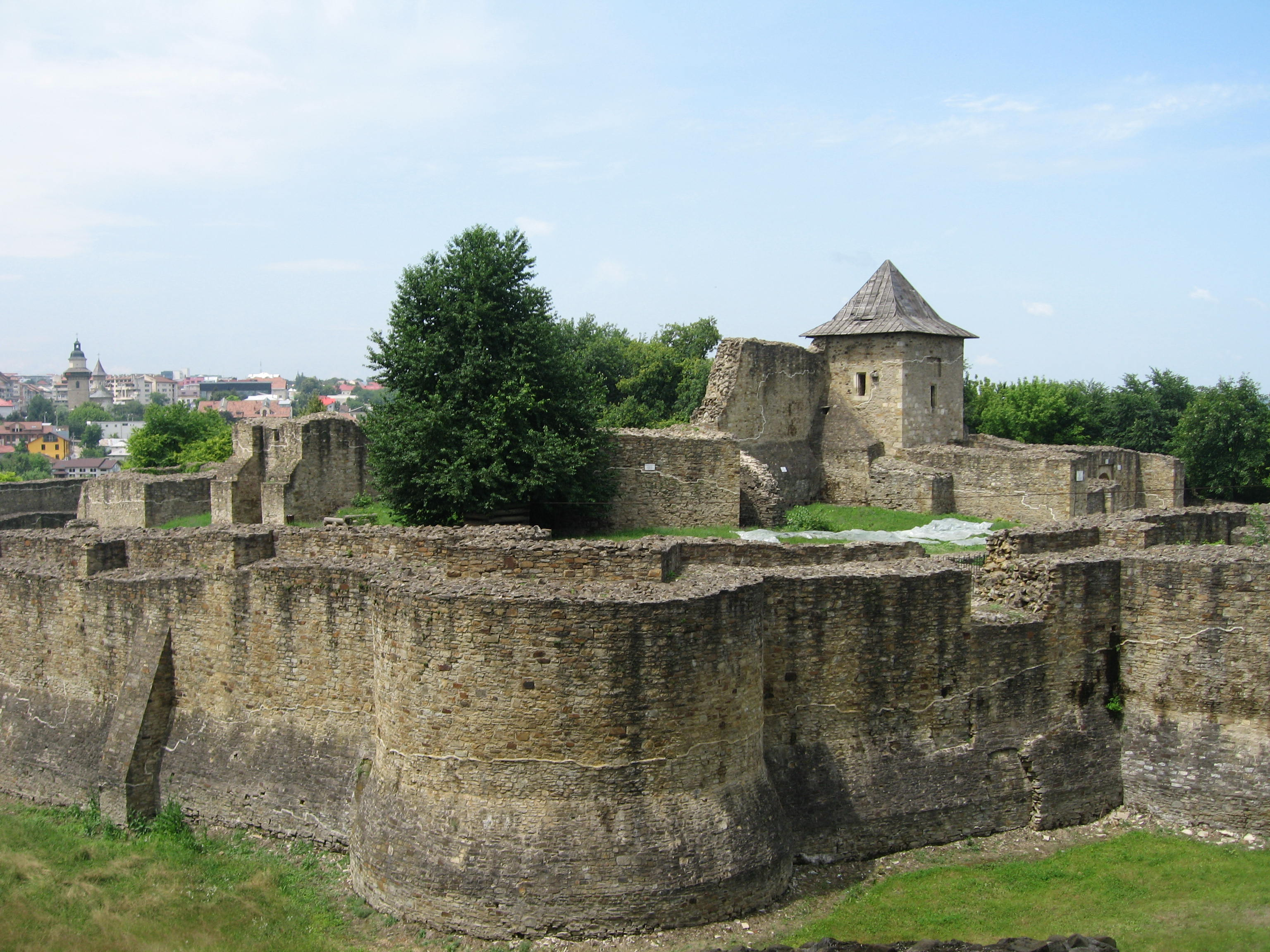
The late 14th century Suceava seat fortress during daytime, as seen in June 2009.

Suceava was the capital of the former Principality of Moldavia between 1388 and 1565. During this period, the castle served as princely residence. Alexandru Lăpușneanu had subsequently moved the Moldavian capital to Iași in 1565, so the castle lost its status. Afterwards, the citadel entered a period of steep decline. In 1675, during the reign of Dumitrașcu Cantacuzino, the fortress was destroyed. Then, for over two centuries, the castle was completely deserted.

During the late 19th century and early 20th century, under the patronage of Austrian architect Karl Adolf Romstorfer, a series of rehabilitation works and archaeological research had been conducted. Between 1961 and 1970 other restoration and consolidation processes were carried out. In 2013, a major reconstruction program was launched, aiming to return the castle to its original architecture and shape.

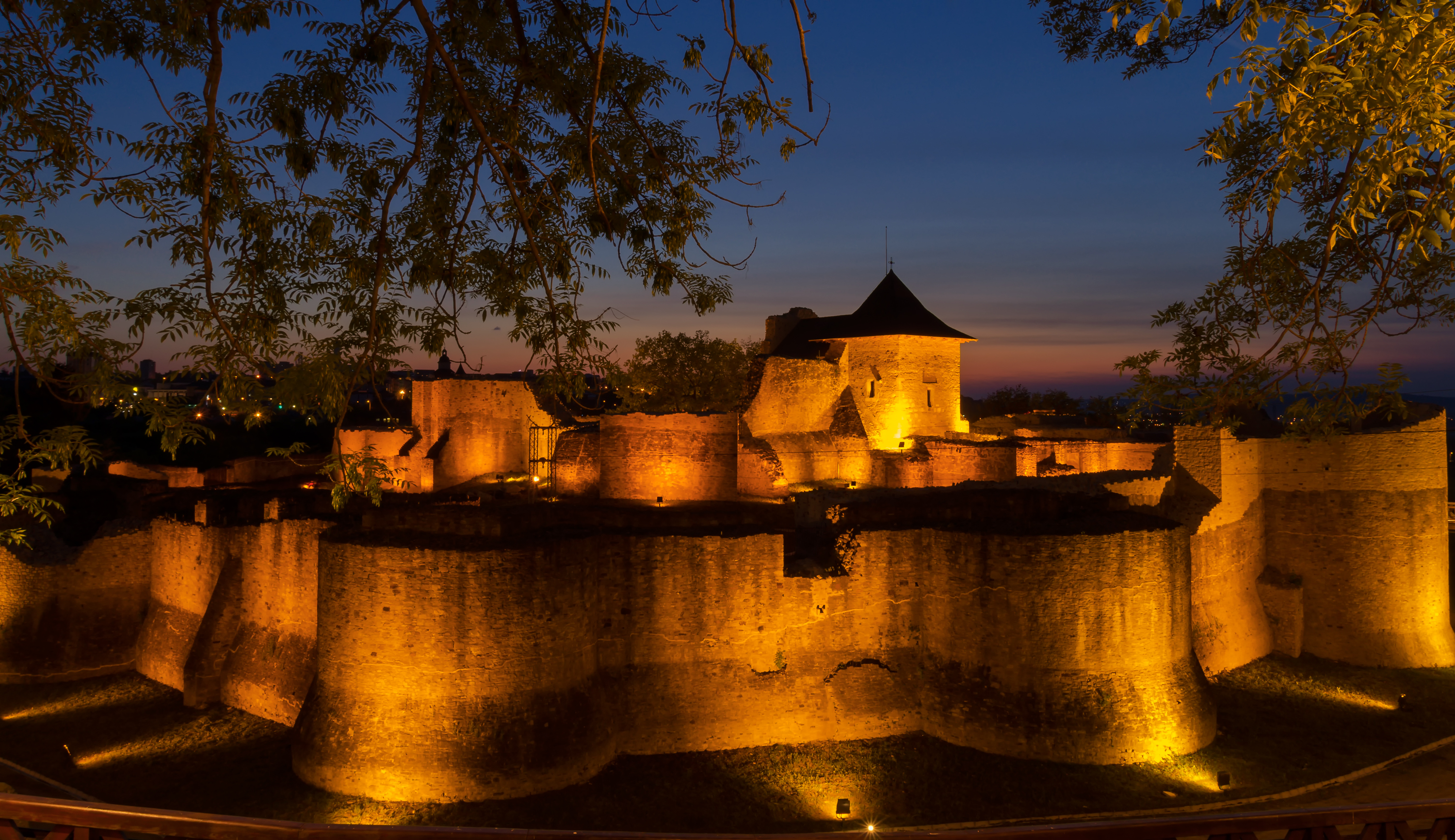
The late 14th century Suceava seat fortress as seen during nighttime in May 2015.

The Seat Fortress of Suceava consists of two concentric citadels. The inner citadel, known as fortul mușatin, has a rectangular shape and a patio (i.e. inner courtyard). It was built by Prince (Romanian: Domnitor) Petru Mușat during the late 14th century. During the second half of the 15th century, Stephen the Great expanded the structure by adding another citadel that had a circular shape surrounding the old one.

After 1476, new fortifications were added to the outer citadel. Furthermore, the whole castle is encircled by a large defensive ditch. Today, the fortress is a landmark of Suceava and a noteworthy touristic attraction. Since 2011, it has also been used for hosting cultural events such as the rock music festival Bucovina Rock Castle. The festival attracted a series of renowned national and international bands and artists (e.g. guitarist Jan Akkerman, formerly of Dutch jazz fusion and progressive rock band Focus).

=== The Princely Court of Suceava ===
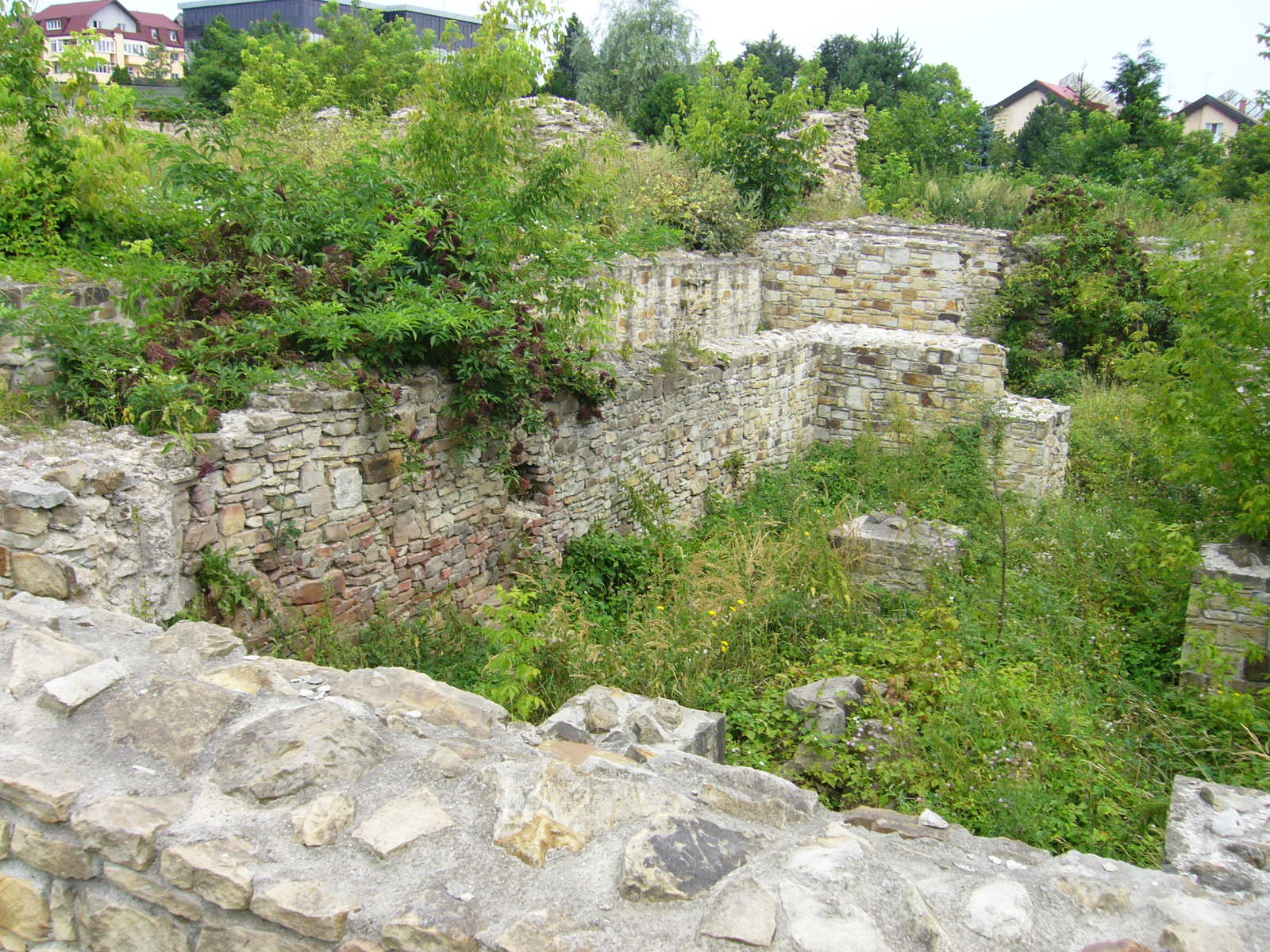
Present-day ruins of the local Princely Court (Romanian: Curtea domnească)

The Princely Court of Suceava (Romanian: Curtea Domnească din Suceava) was built and developed along with the Seat Fortress. During the late 14th century, voivode Petru Mușat built the Princely House, a structure made in wood, which included a cellar. After 1400, Alexander I of Moldavia rebuilt the wooden house and added a surrounding stone wall and a complex of buildings also built in stone. During the second half of the 15th century, the Princely Court was severely affected by fire, the wooden house being completely burned out.

During his reign, Stephen the Great (1457–1504) restored the whole complex. A new Princely House was built, this time made of stone, and the other buildings were extended. Vasile Lupu (1634–1653) was the last ruler of Moldavia who took care of the Princely Court. During his time, the cellars were rehabilitated. The complex was abandoned at some point in the late 17th century, the buildings and the walls being gradually dismantled. Currently, on the site of the Princely Court there are only ruins and leftovers of the former buildings. The ruins of the former medieval court are located in the city center of Suceava. Between 14th and 17th centuries, in the proximity of the Princely Court there were built several churches that still exist today and attract tourists.

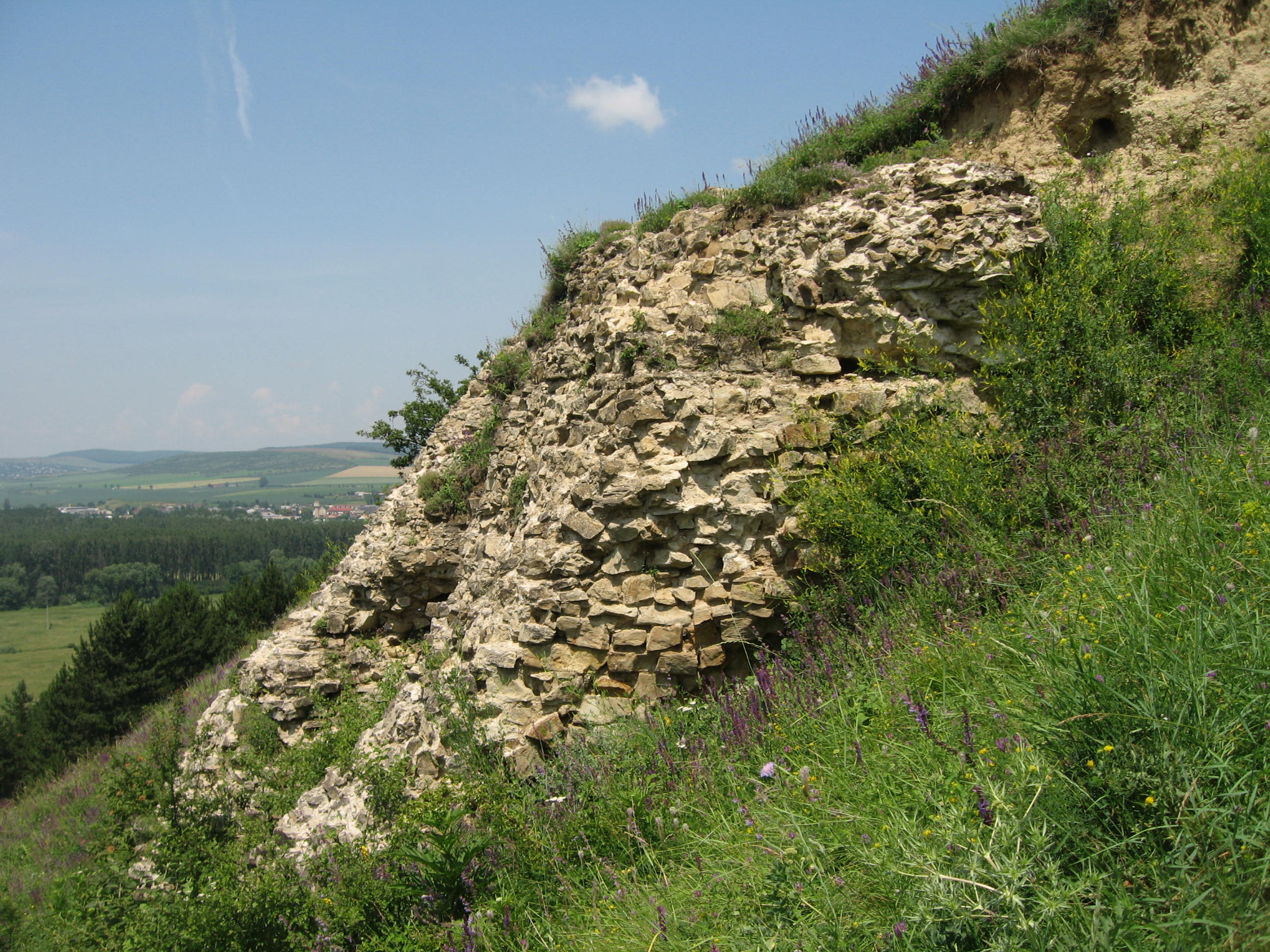
The ruined walls of the Șcheia Fortress on Șeptilici Hill

=== Șcheia Fortress ===
On the north-western edge of the contemporary city, on a hilltop, there is another medieval citadel known as Șcheia Fortress (Romanian: Cetatea Șcheia) or the Western Fortress of Suceava (Romanian: Cetatea de Apus a Sucevei). Unlike the Seat Fortress, Șcheia Fortress has left nothing but some ruined walls. The citadel proper was built during the reign of Petru Mușat during the late 14th century, but was short-lived, given that it was dismantled during the early 15th century, in the time of Alexander I of Moldavia. Șcheia Fortress, just like the main Seat Fortress, was part of the fortification system built in the medieval Principality of Moldavia during the late 14th century.

=== Museums ===
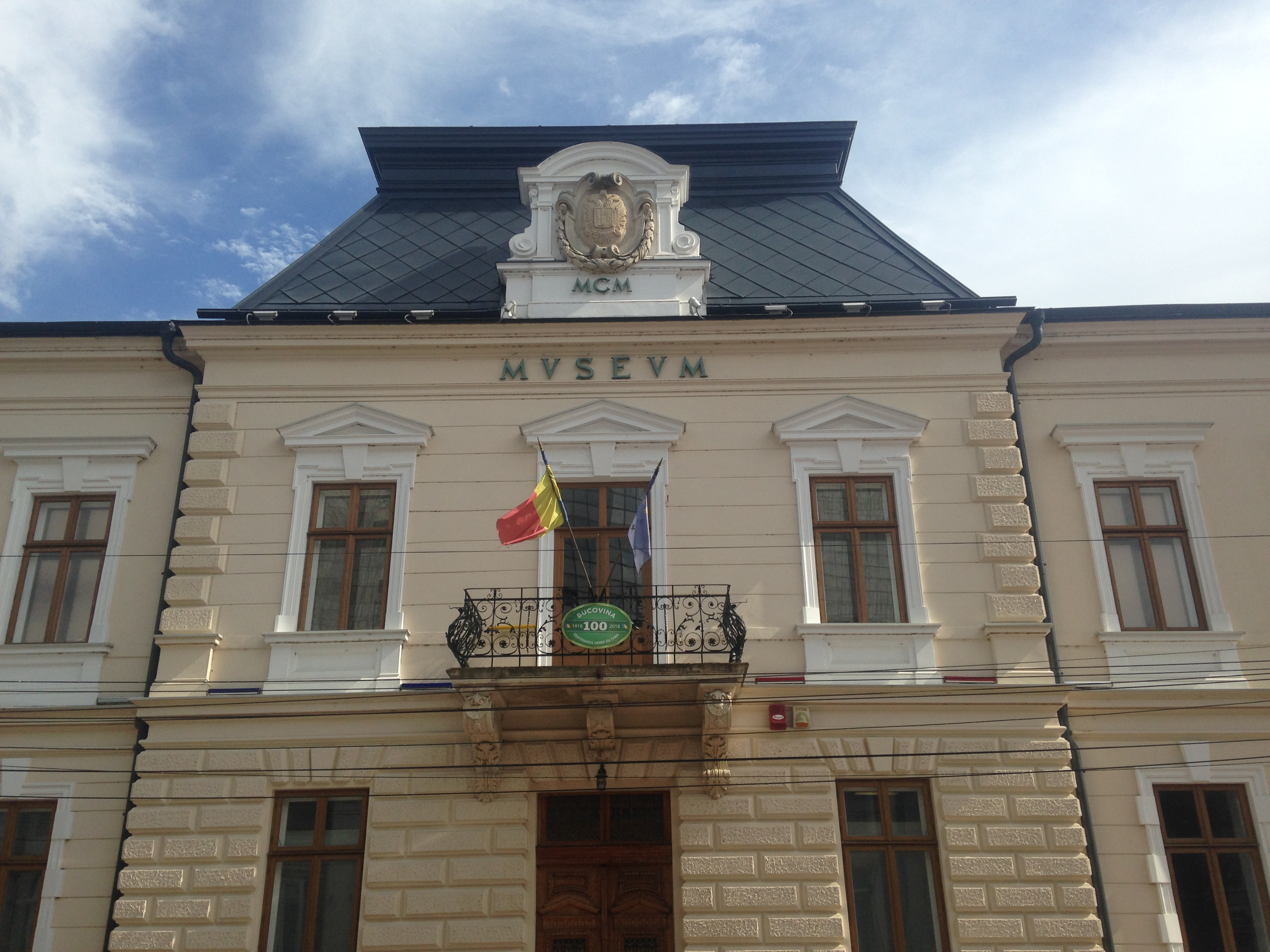
The entrance to the Bukovina History Museum. During the interwar period, the building served as Suceava County prefecture.

The first museum in Suceava was opened in 1900, by the initiative of some local intellectuals. In the beginning, the museum included only a few collections that were obtained as a result of the researches and excavation works at the Seat Fortress of Suceava. The museum was expanded and developed over time and became an important cultural institution, currently named Bukovina Museum (Romanian: Muzeul Bucovinei). It has several departments and administers the medieval sites of the Seat Fortress, Șcheia Fortress and the Princely Court, local museums (Bukovina Village Museum, the history, ethnographic, and natural sciences museums), the memorial houses of Simion Florea Marian in Suceava, Nicolae Labiș in Mălini, Eusebiu Camilar in Udești, Ciprian Porumbescu in Stupca, and two traditional houses located in Solca and Bilca.

The oldest department of Bukovina Museum is the history museum, which was the backbone for creating a county museum at Suceava. This museum presents the local history of Suceava and Moldavia in the context of Romanian national history. The exhibits of the history museum and the offices of Bukovina Museum are located in a historic building, in the city center. The building, which hosted the prefecture of Suceava County during the interwar period, was built between 1902 and 1903. Since 1968, it houses the history museum. In 2014, the building and the museum entered an extensive program of modernization, rehabilitation, and expansion.

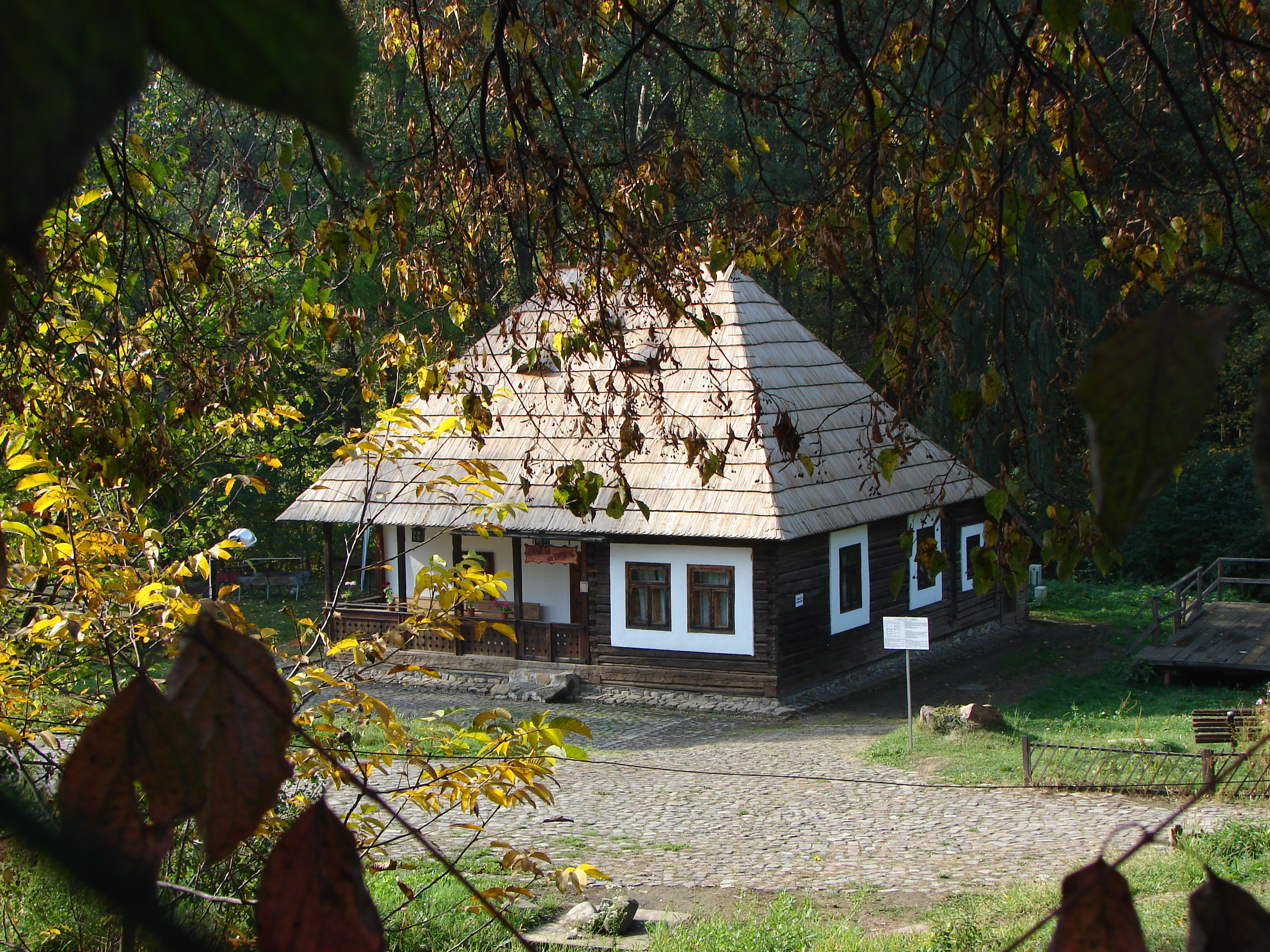
Inn from Dorna ethnographic area, exhibited at Bukovina Village Museum

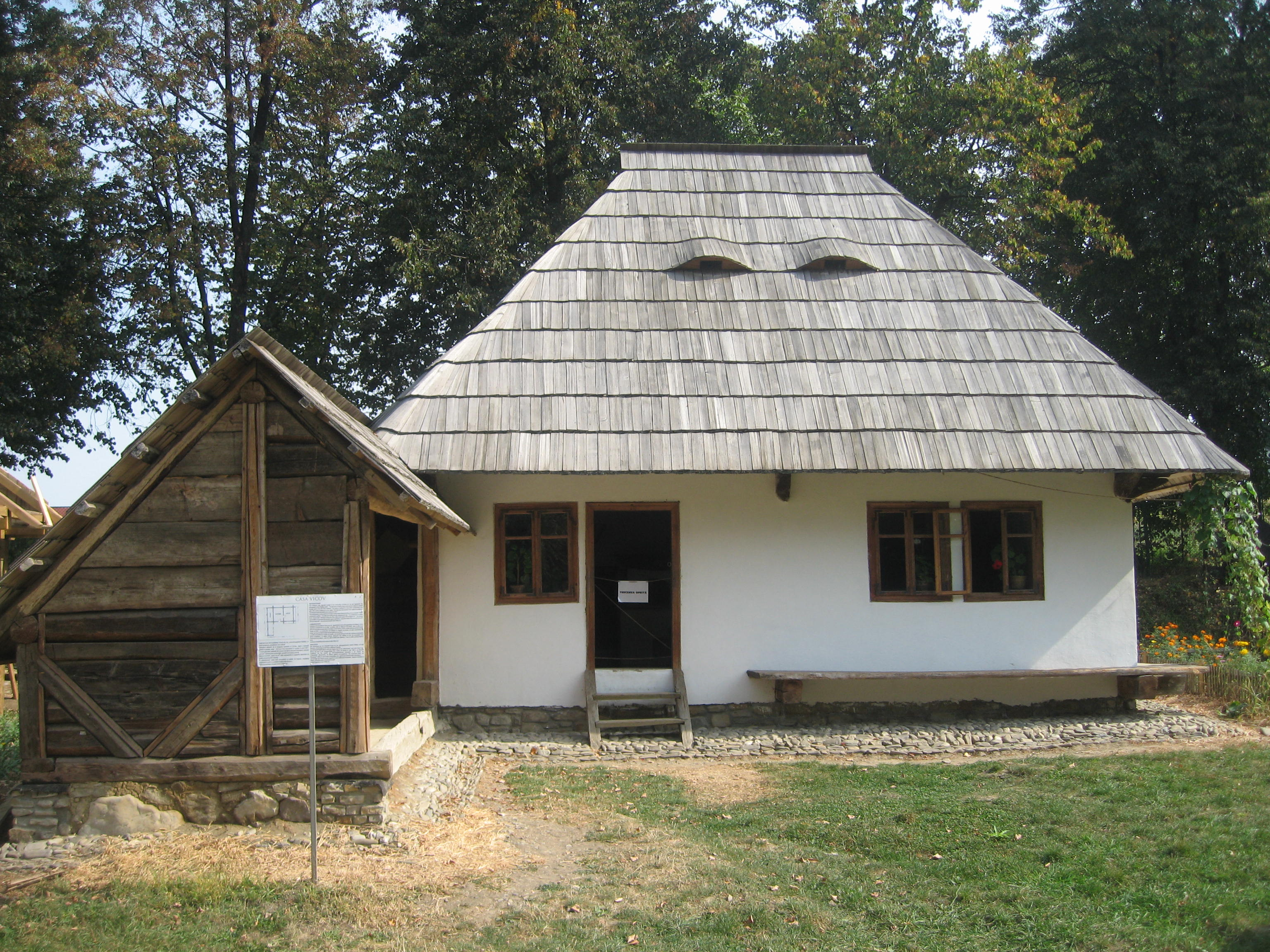
Traditional household from Vicovu de Jos

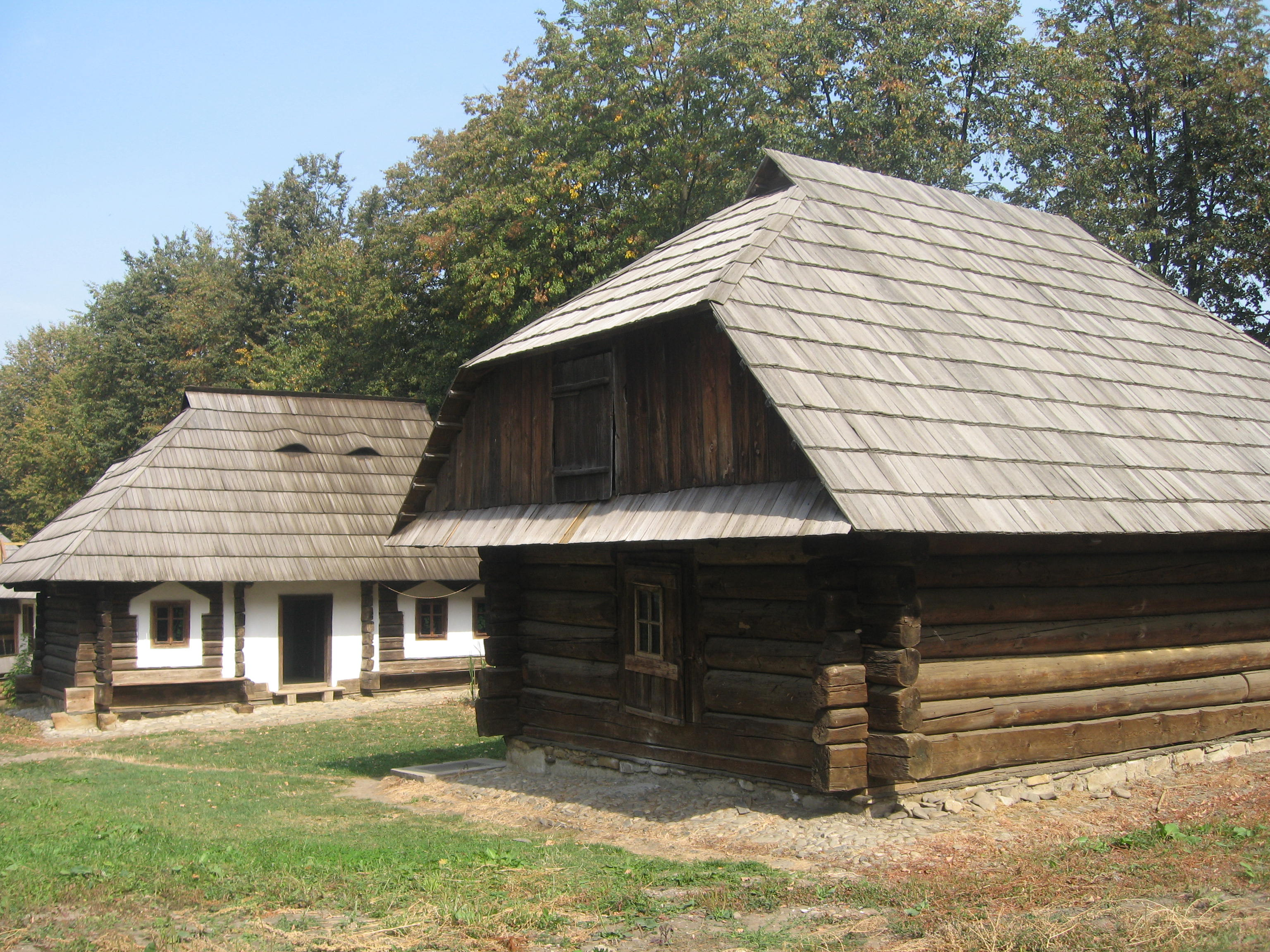
Traditional household from Straja

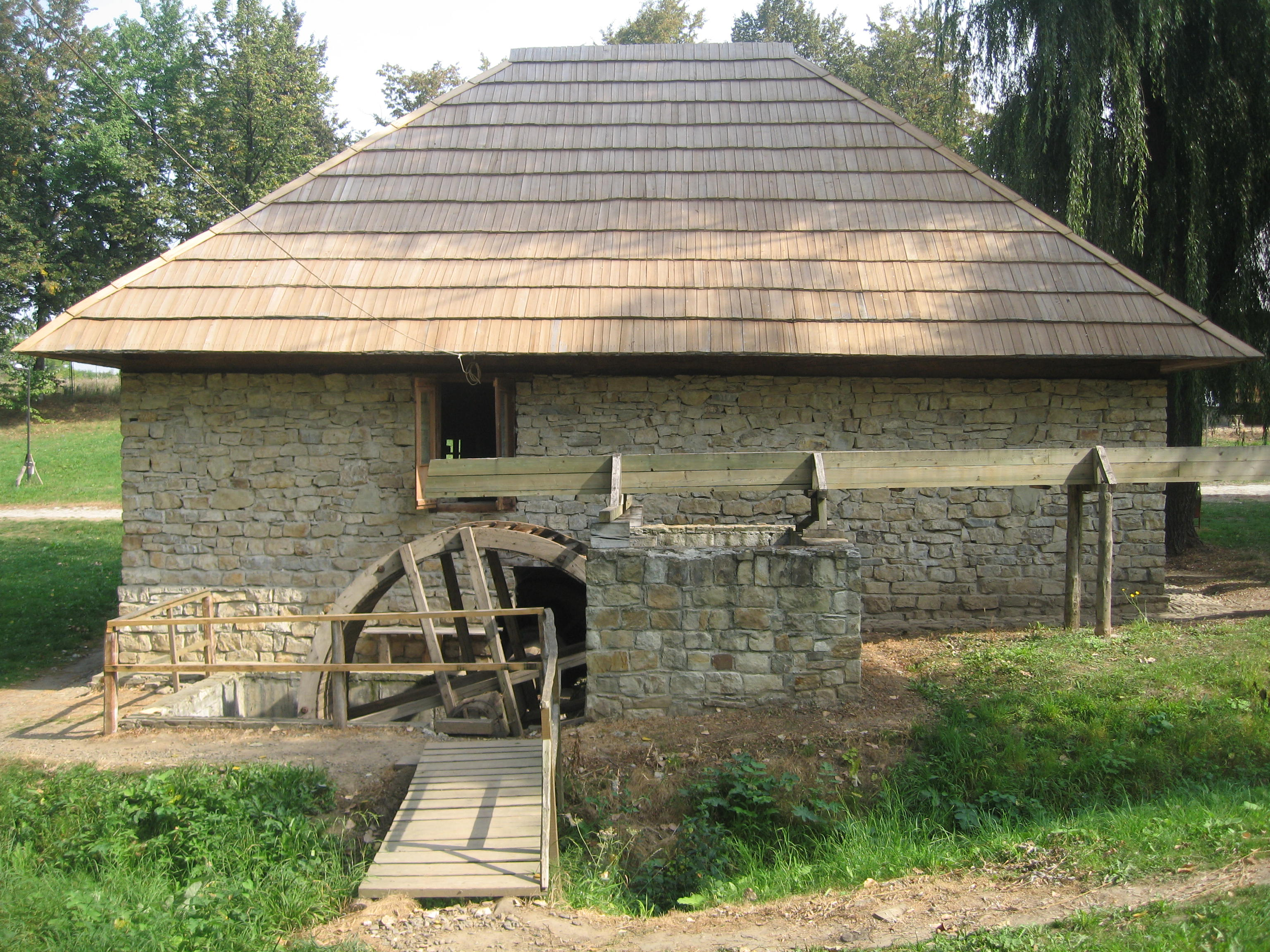
Windmill from Mănăstirea Humorului

At the history museum there is a reconstitution of a scene from the former throne hall located in the Seat Fortress. The scene presents some notable people from the history of Moldavia, made in glass fiber: Stephen the Great (ruler of Moldavia), Maria Voichița (his third wife), Bogdan III the One-Eyed (his son and successor to the throne), officials of that time. The scene chosen to be reconstructed is an allotment of land for peasants. The reconstitution is based on medieval documents, frescoes, and archaeological researches. Furthermore, the history museum periodically organizes a wide range of cultural events, several of which also involve the local branch of the Democratic Forum of Germans in Romania (FDGR/DFDR). Furthermore, the local branch of the FDGR/DFDR (German: DFDR Buchenland) is also in charge of the ACI Bukowina Stiftung, a Romanian-German cultural foundation whose president is Josef-Otto Exner.

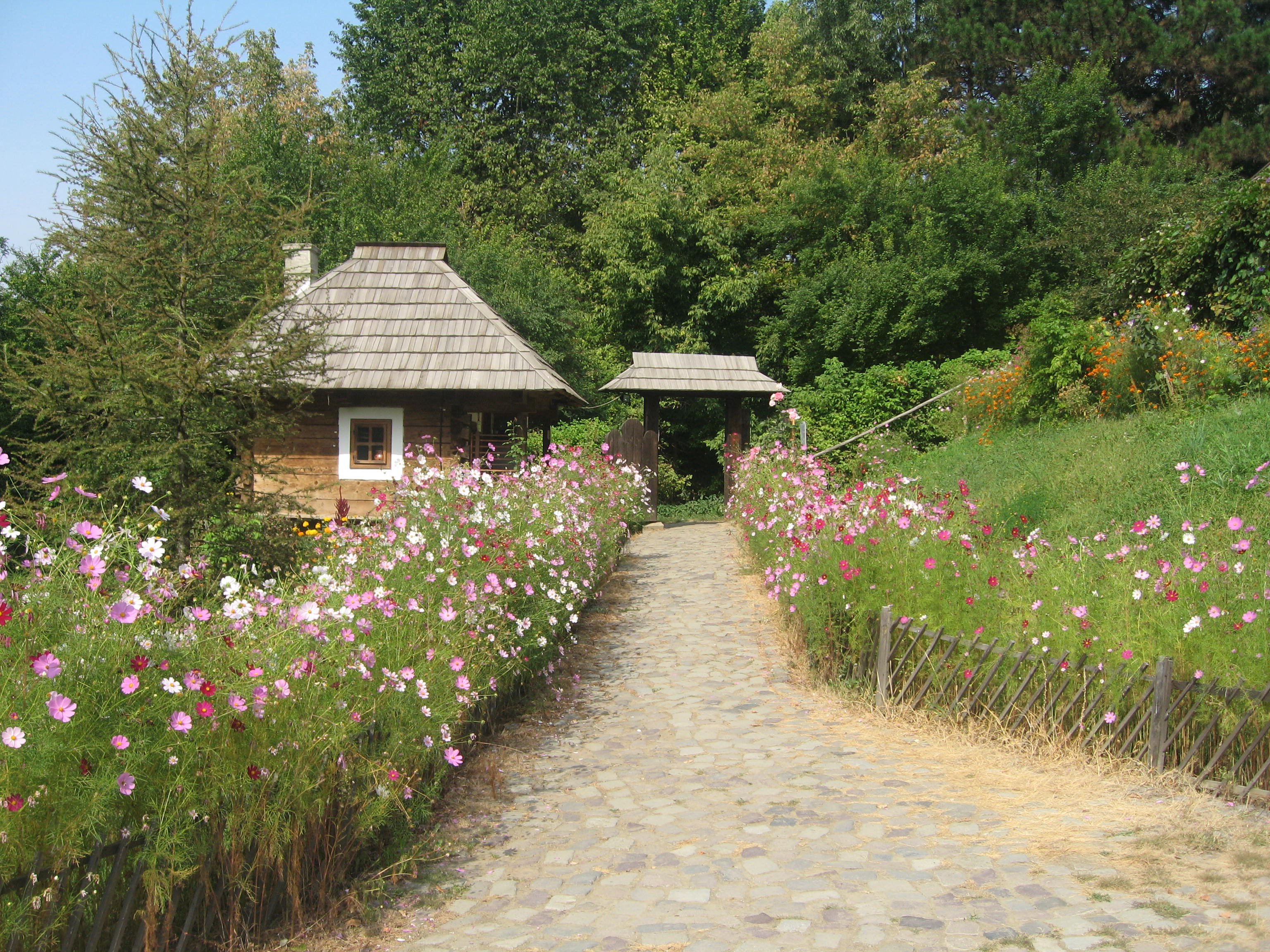
Bukovina Village Museum – The Câmpulung Moldovenesc Hut and the main entrance.

Bukovina Village Museum (Romanian: Muzeul Satului Bucovinean) is an open-air museum that highlights the traditional cultural and architectural heritage of Bukovina region. It is located in the eastern part of Suceava, near the Seat Fortress. It was founded in the 1970s, but its major expansion and development took place after 1990. The museum is designed as a traditional village in Bukovina, containing houses and various objectives from the ethnographic areas of Rădăuți, Humor, Câmpulung Moldovenesc, Dorna, and Fălticeni.

The museum includes among others a water mill from Mănăstirea Humorului, a traditional blacksmith workshop, a pottery workshop from Marginea and one of the many old wooden churches in northern Moldavia: Church of the Ascension, a Romanian Orthodox wooden church built in 1783 in Vama, a village in Suceava County. The bell tower is also made in wood, and dates from 1787. The church and the bell tower were both relocated in 2001, and currently are part of the museum.

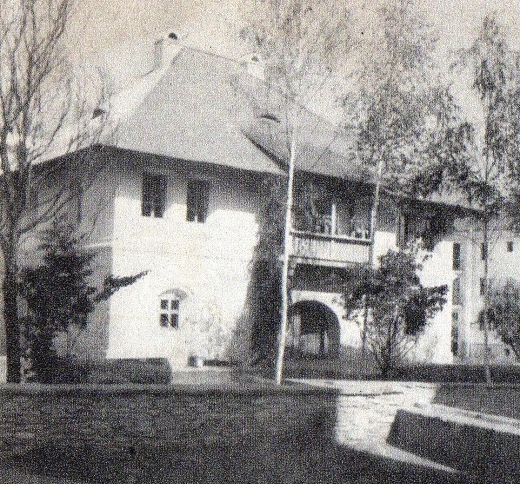
The Princely Inn during communism

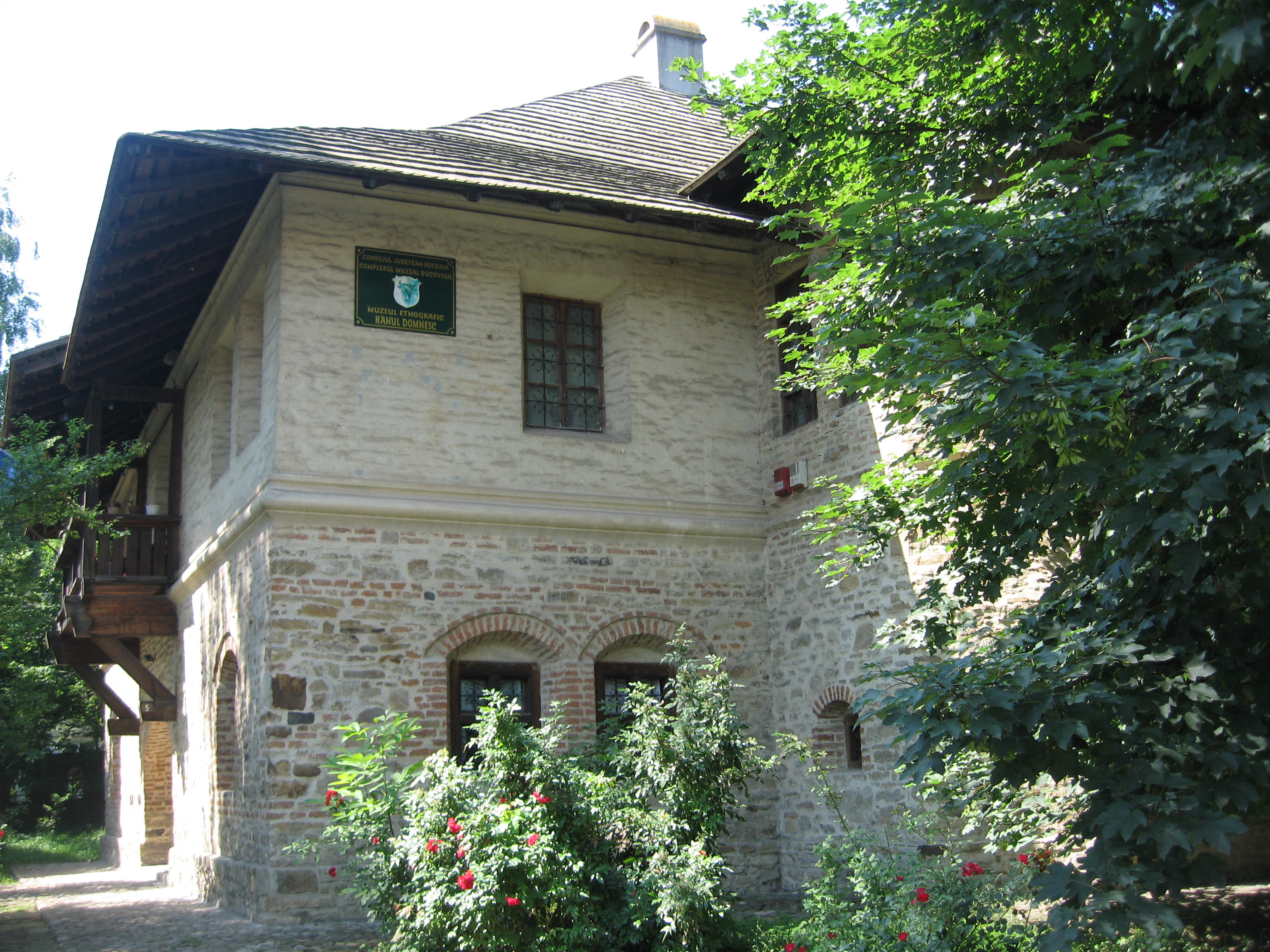
Entrance to the Princely Inn (now Ethnographic Museum)

Besides Bukovina Village Museum, another museum that reflects the traditional life in this part of Romania is the ethnographic museum. It was opened in 1968 and includes old collections and exhibits that are housed in a medieval inn located in the center of Suceava, known as the Princely Inn of Suceava (Romanian: Hanul Domnesc din Suceava). This landmark dates from the late 16th and early 17th century. It was built of stone and has two floors and a cellar. During the Austrian rule (1775–1918), the inn operated as a hunting lodge for the imperial family. Since 1968, it hosts the ethnographic museum. The Princely Inn is the oldest civic building in Suceava which had not been seriously affected by time and maintained its original architecture.

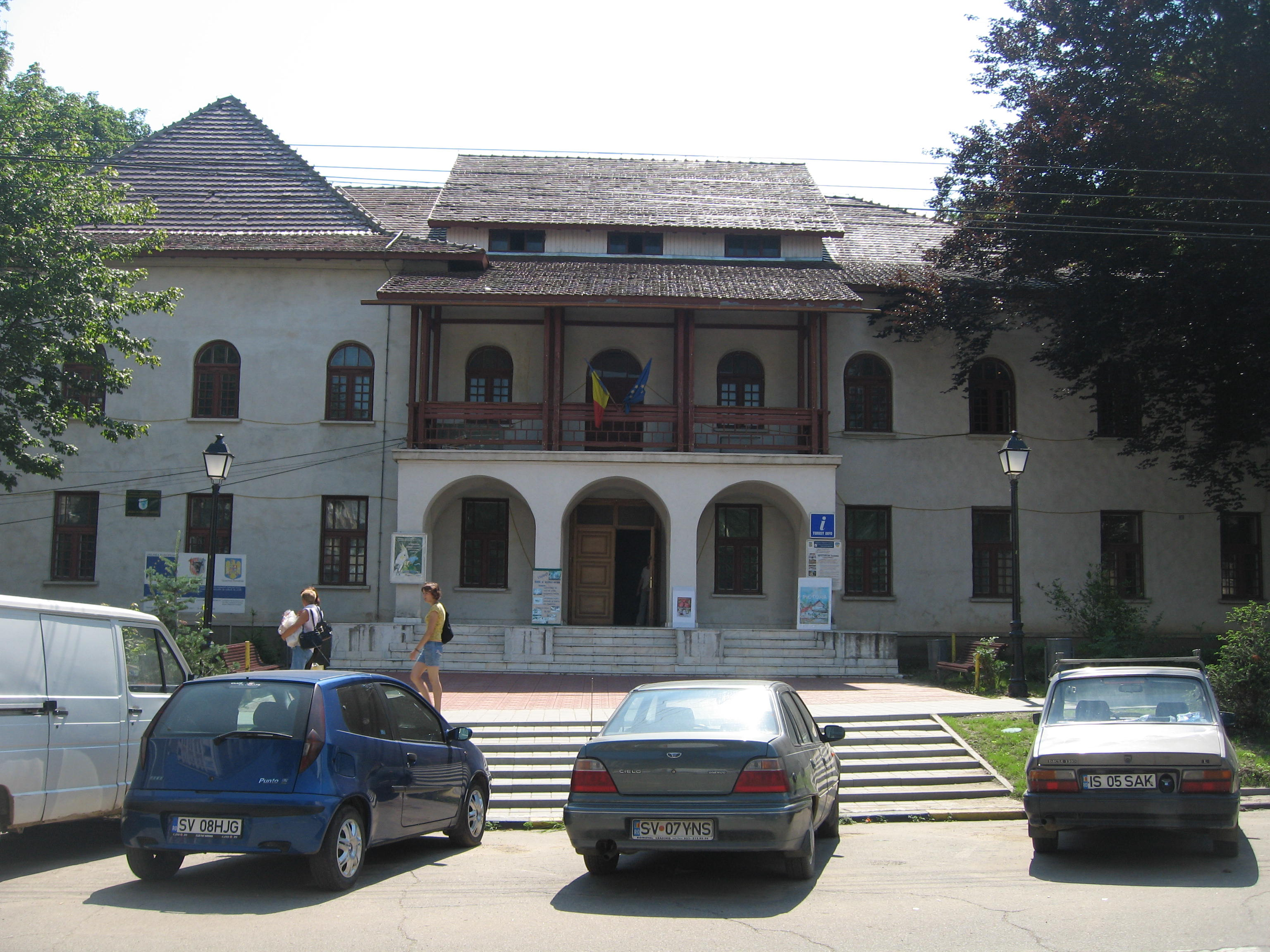
Natural Sciences Museum

The natural sciences museum was founded in 1976–1977, being the newest museum in Suceava. It highlights the flora and fauna of the surrounding area. The museum's rare exhibits and collections are housed in an old building, located in the central park of the city and built between 1811 and 1814. In the past, before being an attraction for visitors, the building operated as a school for boys.

Along with all these museums, Bukovina Museum includes memorial houses of some writers and artists born in this area of the country. The memorial house of Simion Florea Marian (Romanian: Casa memorială Simion Florea Marian) is the only one located in Suceava, the other ones being in the surrounding area. The memorial house operates as a museum. It was opened in 1974 in the home where Romanian priest and writer Simion Florea Marian lived, from 1884 until 1907, when he died. The museum hosts a collection that contains over 10,000 volumes, over 450 collections of magazines and newspapers, of which 150 are from Bukovina, manuscripts, letters, cultural and historical documents, old photos. In front of the memorial house it was opened a small park with a statue dedicated to Simion Florea Marian.

=== Historical buildings ===
Colegiul de Artă Ciprian Porumbescu (Romanian: Ciprian Porumbescu Art College) is a high school which is hosted in a historic building, built in 1859, in the city center of Suceava. The building had several destinations in the past: Suceava Town Hall (until 1904) and Școala primară română de fete (Primary Romanian school for girls). Romanian jazz singer Anca Parghel taught music for a living in Suceava at this local Arts high school before turning to a professional singing career in 1989.

Gara Suceava Nord-Ițcani (Suceava North railway station, also known as Ițcani) is a train station built in 1871 in the village of Ițcani (today district of Suceava). Between 1871 and 1918, it was a train station at the Austro-Hungarian border. The historic building of Ițcani railway station was built in the Gothic style of the Central European railway stations of that period.

Palatul de Justiție (The Palace of Justice) is a historic building which was built in 1885 to serve as the seat of Suceava Tribunal and Court. The building has four sides and a patio, and was designed by Viennese architect Ferdinand Fellner. Later, during the communist regime, the city hall was moved in this palace and operated here until 2000.

Spitalul Vechi (The Old Hospital) is a complex of buildings built between 1891 and 1903 which originally hosted the district hospital. The hospital ensemble consists of four pavilions of historic value and was built in the southwestern end of Suceava, in Areni neighborhood. In 1964 a new hospital building (known as Spitalul Nou) was inaugurated nearby.

Colegiul Național Ștefan cel Mare (Ștefan cel Mare National College) is the oldest and most prestigious high school in Suceava County, established in 1860. The baroque style building which houses the high school was built between 1893 and 1895, downtown Suceava, and today is considered a historical monument.

Gara Suceava-Burdujeni (Suceava railway station, also known as Burdujeni) is a train station built between 1892 and 1902 in the village of Burdujeni (today district of Suceava). Between 1902 and 1918, it was a train station at the Austro-Hungarian border. The historic building of Burdujeni railway station was built in the architectural style of Fribourg railway station, located in Switzerland.

Palatul Administrativ (The Administrative Palace) is a historic building which was built between 1903 and 1904 to serve as the seat of Suceava City Hall. The building originally had only two sides of the four current sides, and was designed by Viennese architect Peter Paul Brang. It was designed in the baroque style. Currently, the palace houses the prefecture and the county council of Suceava County.

Casa Polonă (The Polish House) is a building made between 1903 and 1907 by the Polish community in the city of Suceava. The building was designed by architect Alojz Friedel. During the communist regime, The Polish House was nationalized, and since 1954, it housed Ansamblul Artistic Ciprian Porumbescu (Ciprian Porumbescu Artistic Ensemble). In 1984 the building was restored, and then hosted a local theatre, until 1990. In 1996, the building was returned to the Polish community of the city.

Uzina de Apă (The Water Plant) is a set of industrial heritage buildings, designed in 1908 by engineer G. Thiem from Leipzig and built between 1910 and 1912. The water plant operated in these buildings between 1912 and 1960, and then it was moved into a modern building. In 2012, in celebration of 100 years since its establishment, in the former water plant buildings there was inaugurated the Centre for Architecture, Urban Culture and Landscape in Suceava.

Biblioteca Bucovinei I.G. Sbiera (I.G. Sbiera Bukovina Library) is the first public library in Suceava, inaugurated on 12 December 1923. It is also the largest library in Suceava County, with over 350,000 bibliographic units. Currently, the library is hosted by two historic buildings located in downtown Suceava and built between 1925 and 1926, respectively 1929–1930.

The County Forestry Department in Suceava is an institution which operates in a heritage building located in Areni neighborhood, in the city of Suceava. The building dates from the first half of the 20th century.

The Unions House in Suceava is a heritage building, located in downtown Suceava, which houses the unions offices, along with some shops. The building is also known as Samuil Isopescu House.

Casa Costin Tarangul (Costin Tarangul House) is a heritage house dating from the 19th century (1886). The building is located next to Simion Florea Marian Memorial House, in the center of Suceava.

Casa Ciprian Porumbescu (Ciprian Porumbescu House) is a heritage house dating from the 19th century, where Romanian composer Ciprian Porumbescu lived and created some of his works. The house is located in Prunului street, downtown Suceava.

School No. 5 Jean Bart in Burdujeni (Suceava) is a school built in 1902 in the village Burdujeni, today a town district of Suceava. The building that houses the school has historic value.

School No. 6 in Burdujeni-Sat (Suceava) is a school built in 1911 in the village Burdujeni, today a town district of Suceava. The building that houses the school has historic value.

Former Burdujeni Town Hall in Suceava is a building that was built in 1902 in the village Burdujeni and initially was the town hall of the locality. In 1926 Burdujeni became a district of Suceava, and so the town hall was abolished. The historic building currently houses the headquarters of Electrica company.

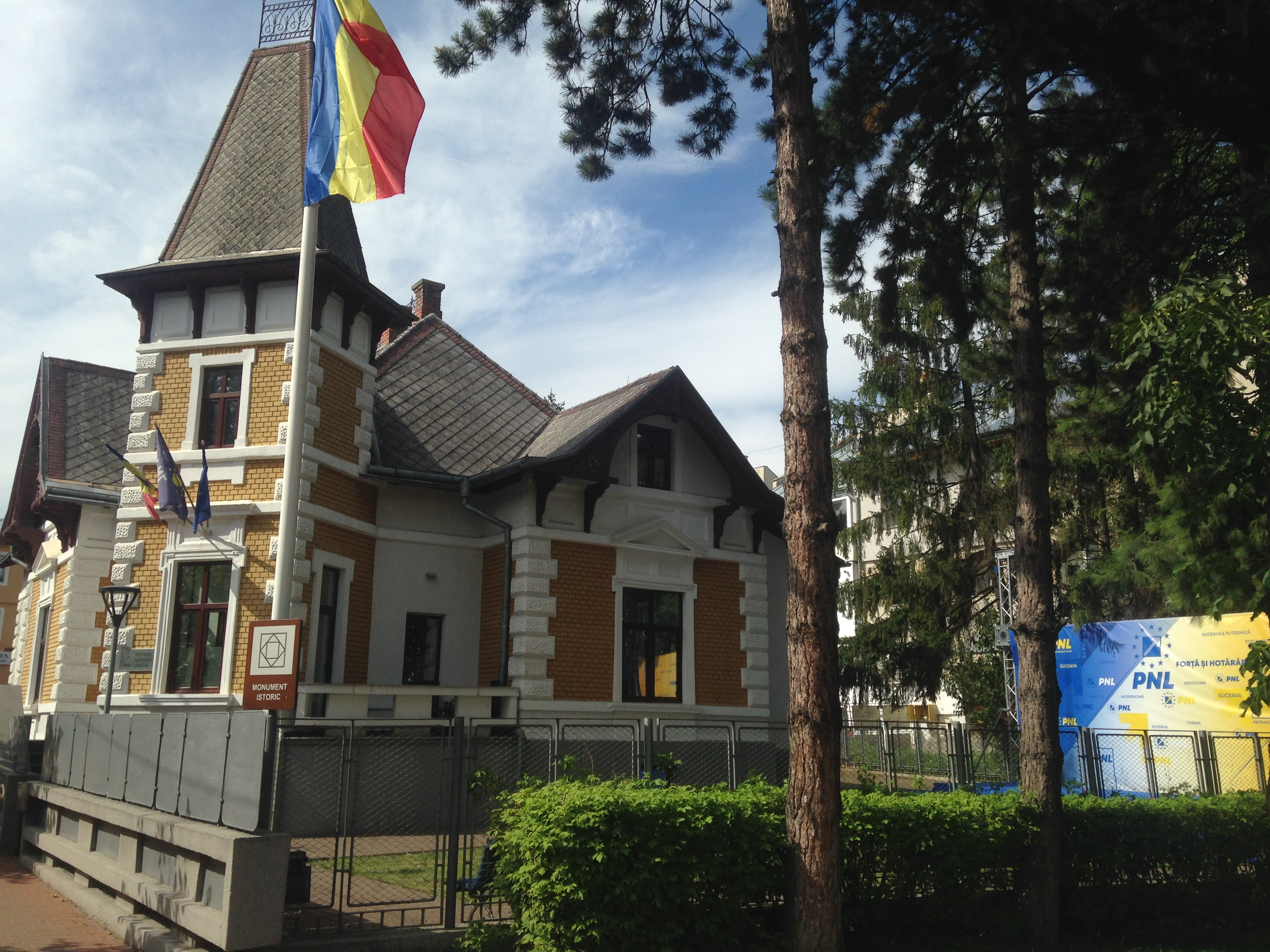
Austrian-style house situated in the historical town centre which currently serves as the local headquarters of PNL Suceava.

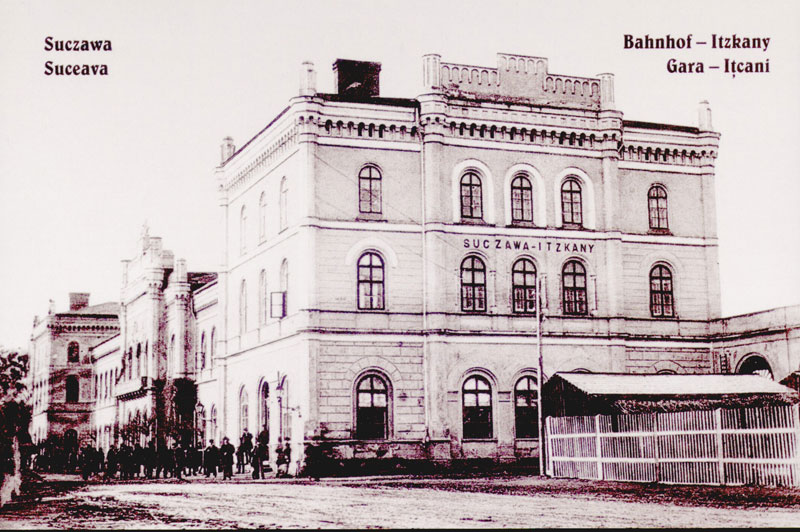
Ițcani railway station during the early 20th century

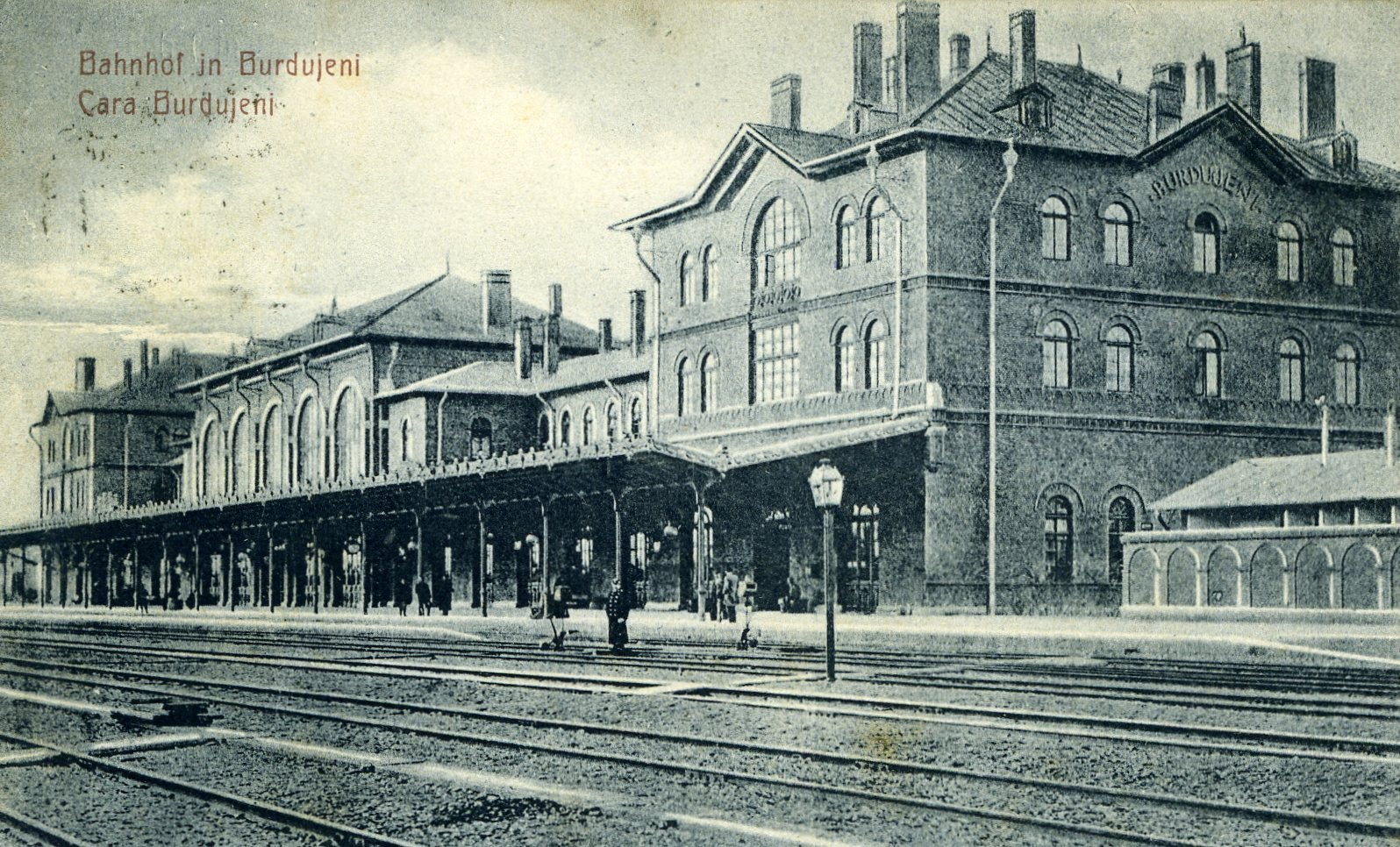
Burdujeni railway station during the early 20th century

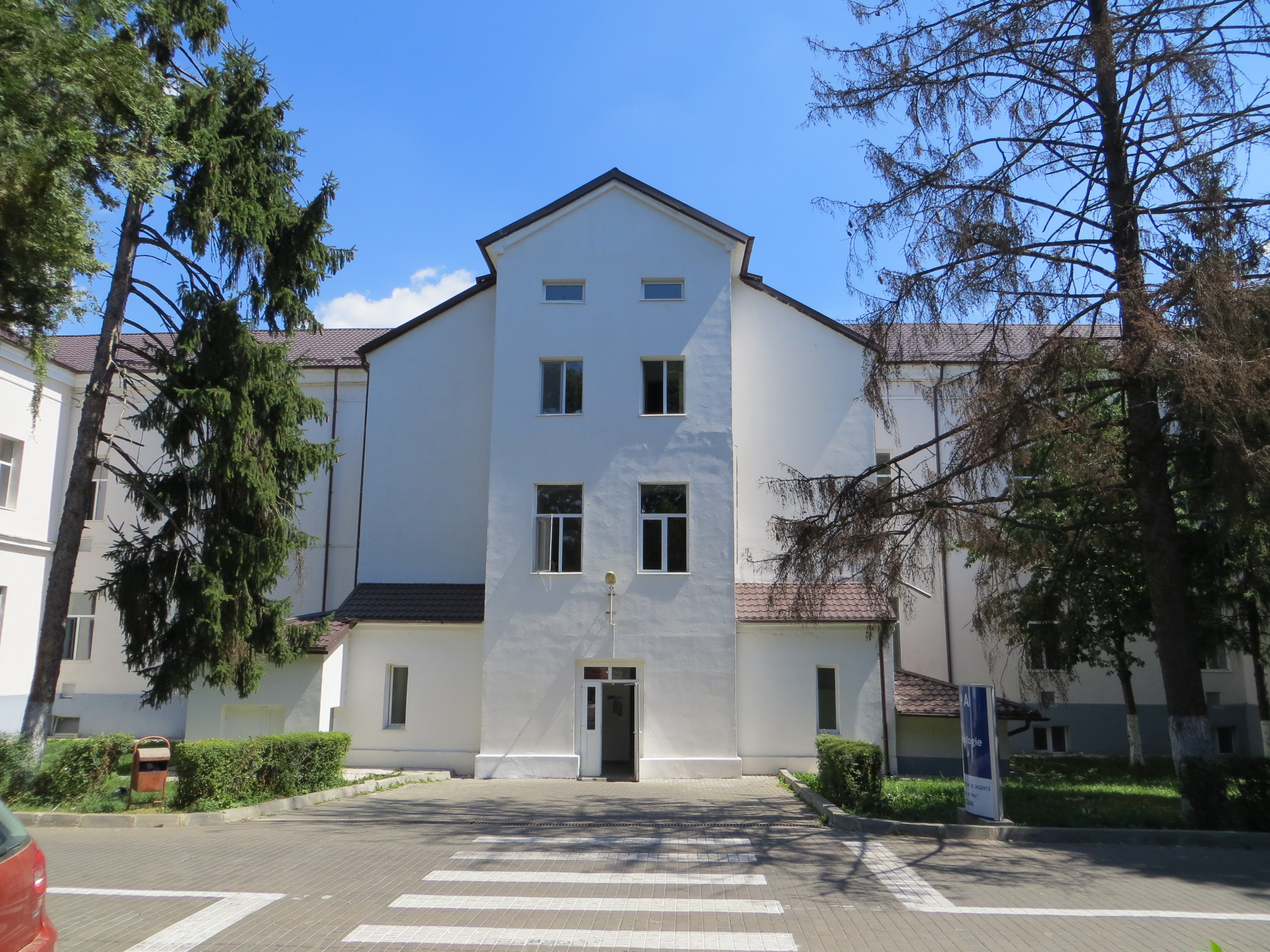
The central pavilion of the Old Hospital in Suceava

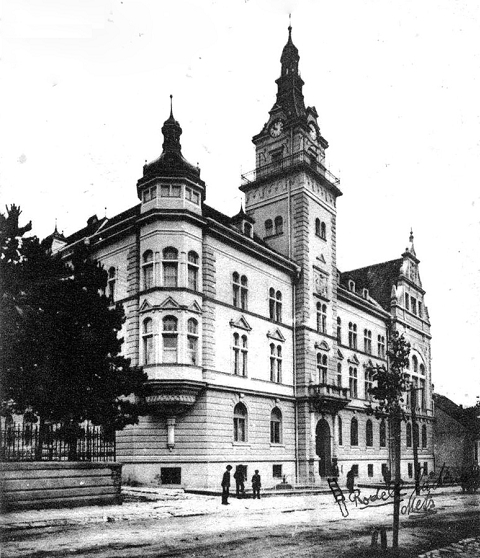
The Administrative Palace during the interwar period

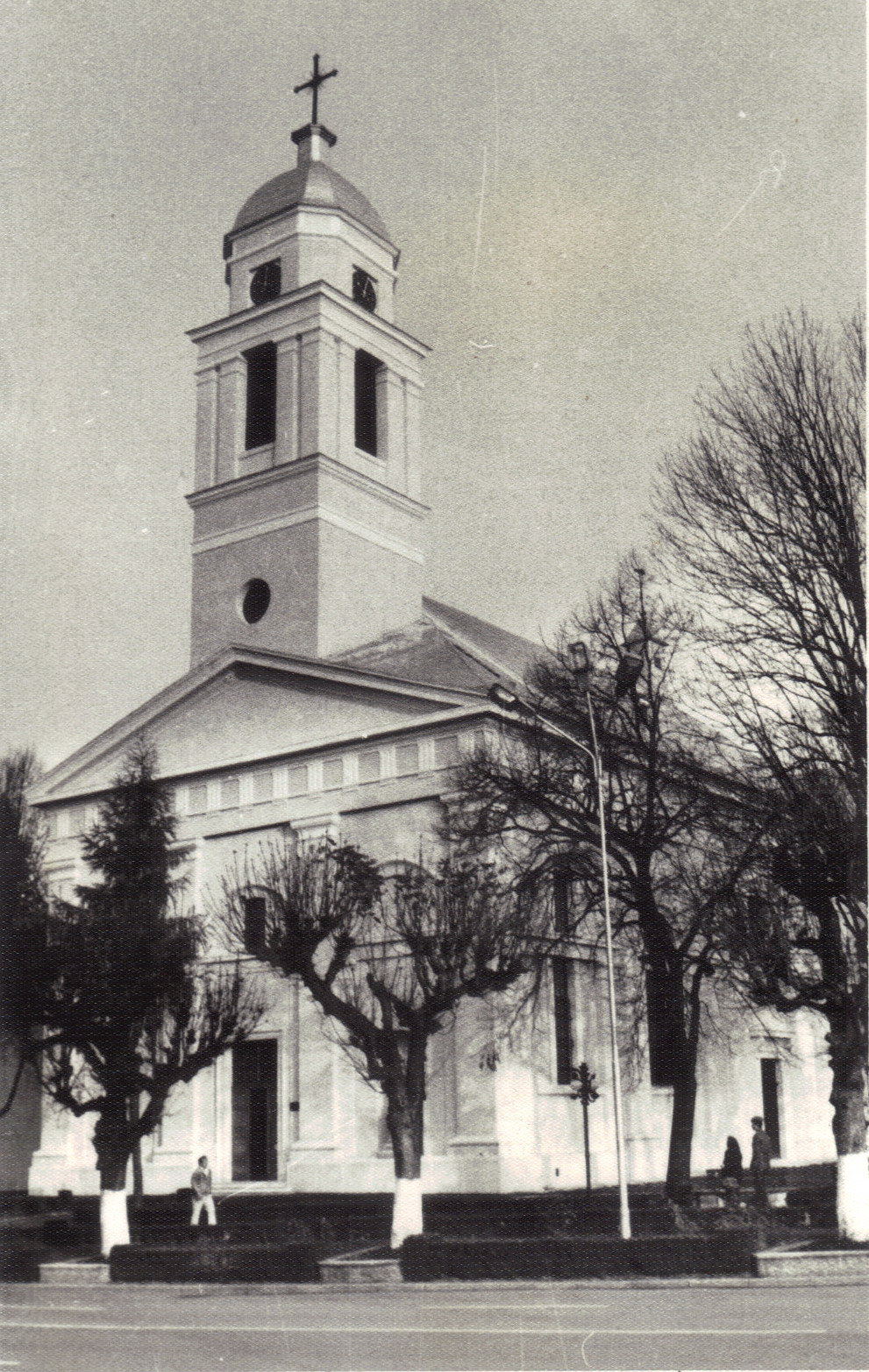
St. John of Nepomuk Roman Catholic church in 1990

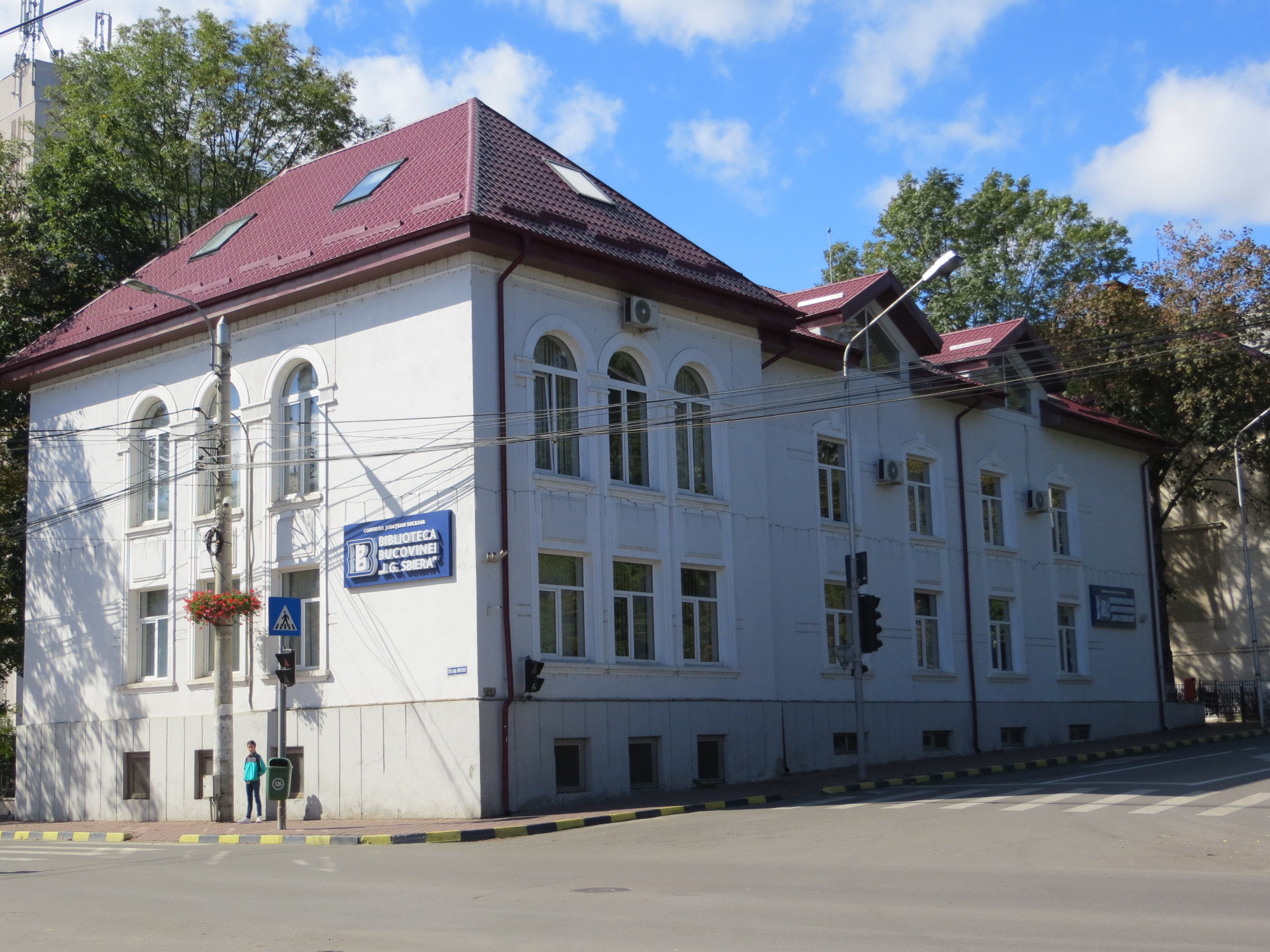
I.G. Sbiera Bukovina Library in Suceava

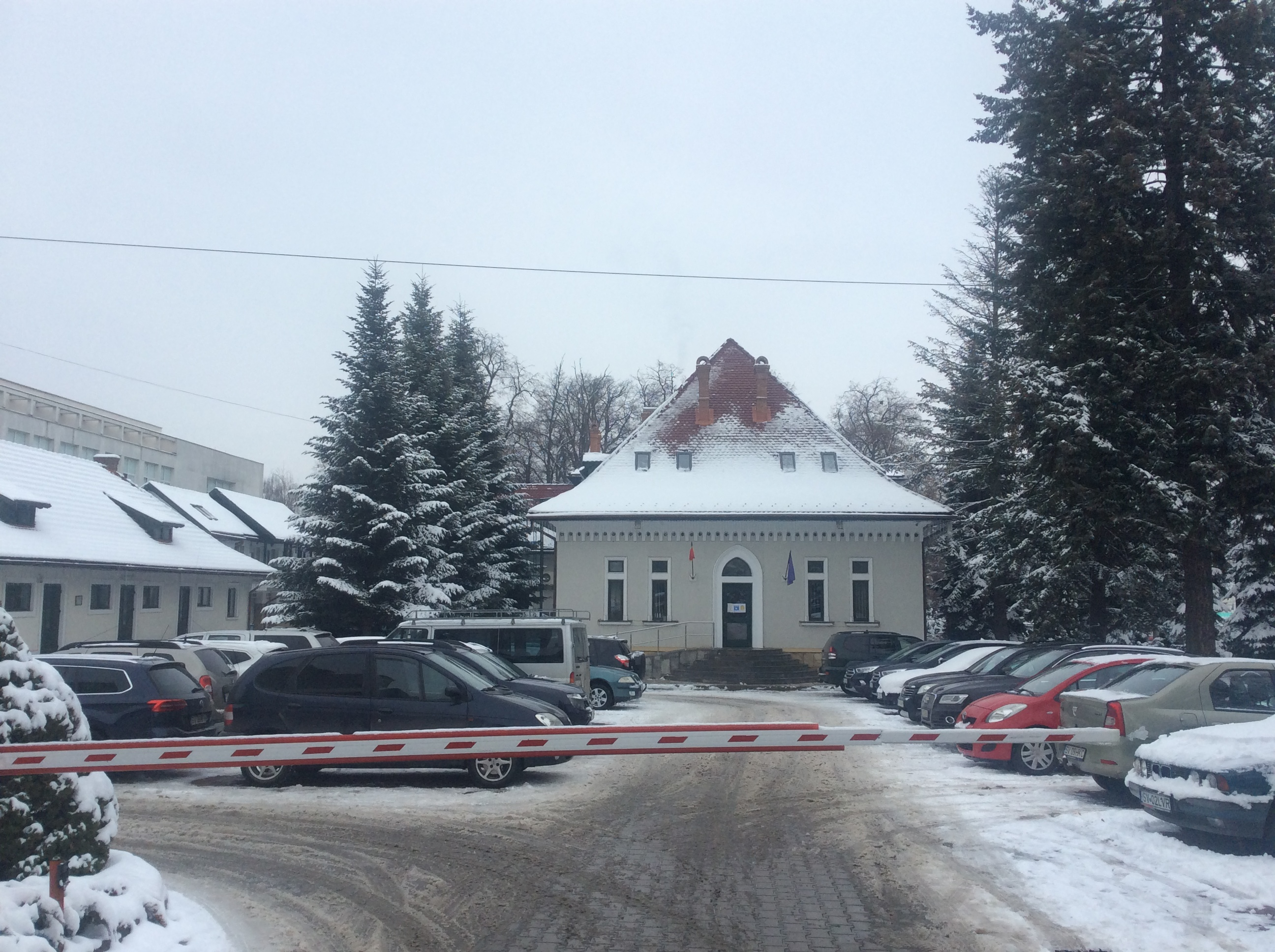
The County Forestry Department in Suceava, as seen during the winter.

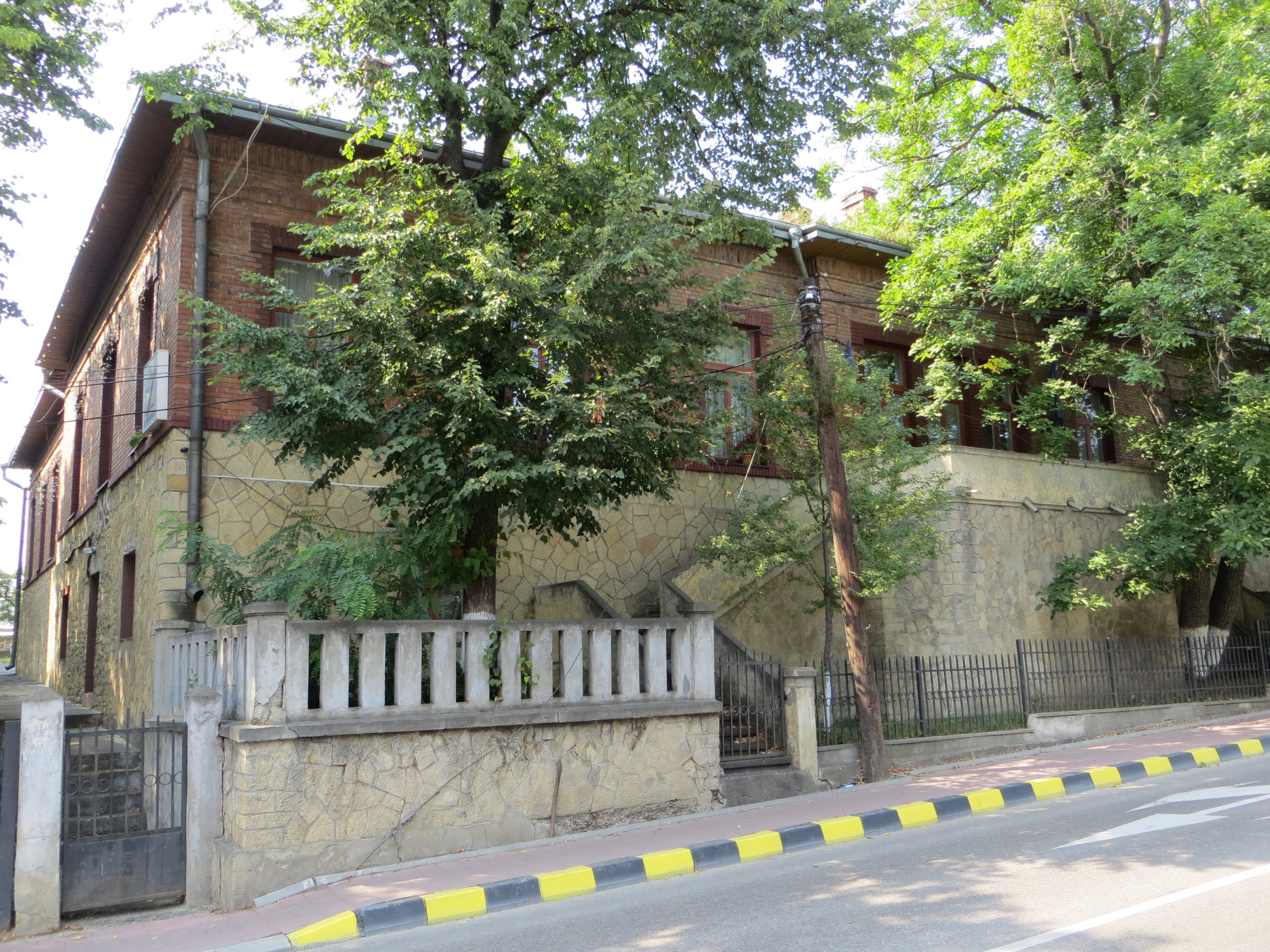
Former Burdujeni town hall building

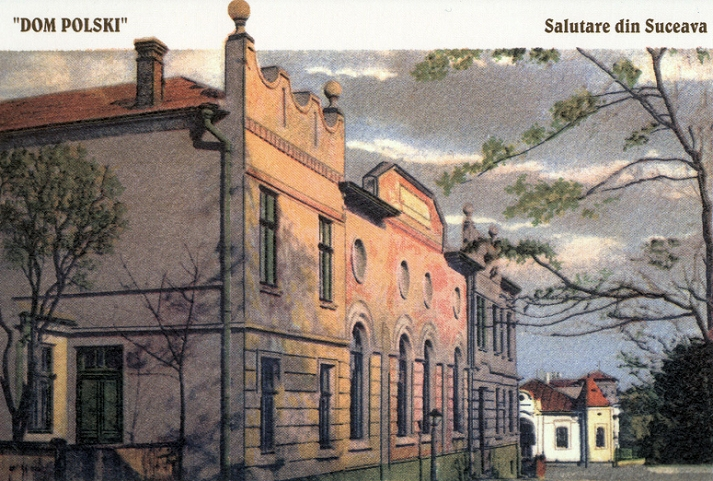
The 'Dom Polski' Polish House

==== Ițcani neighbourhood ====
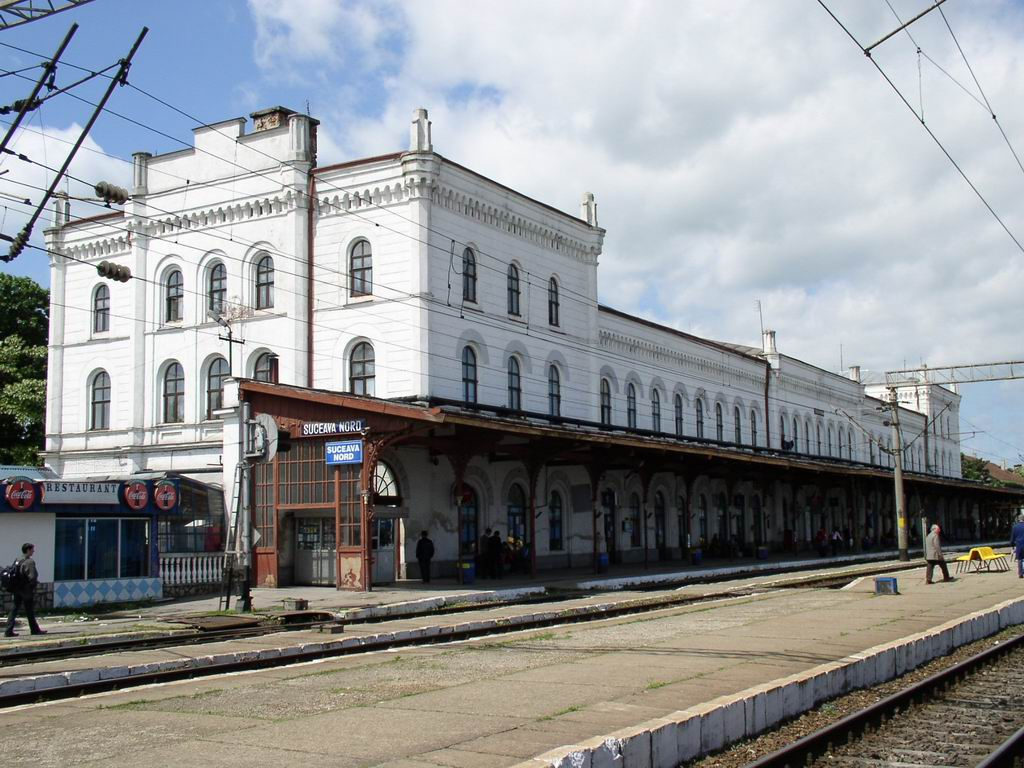
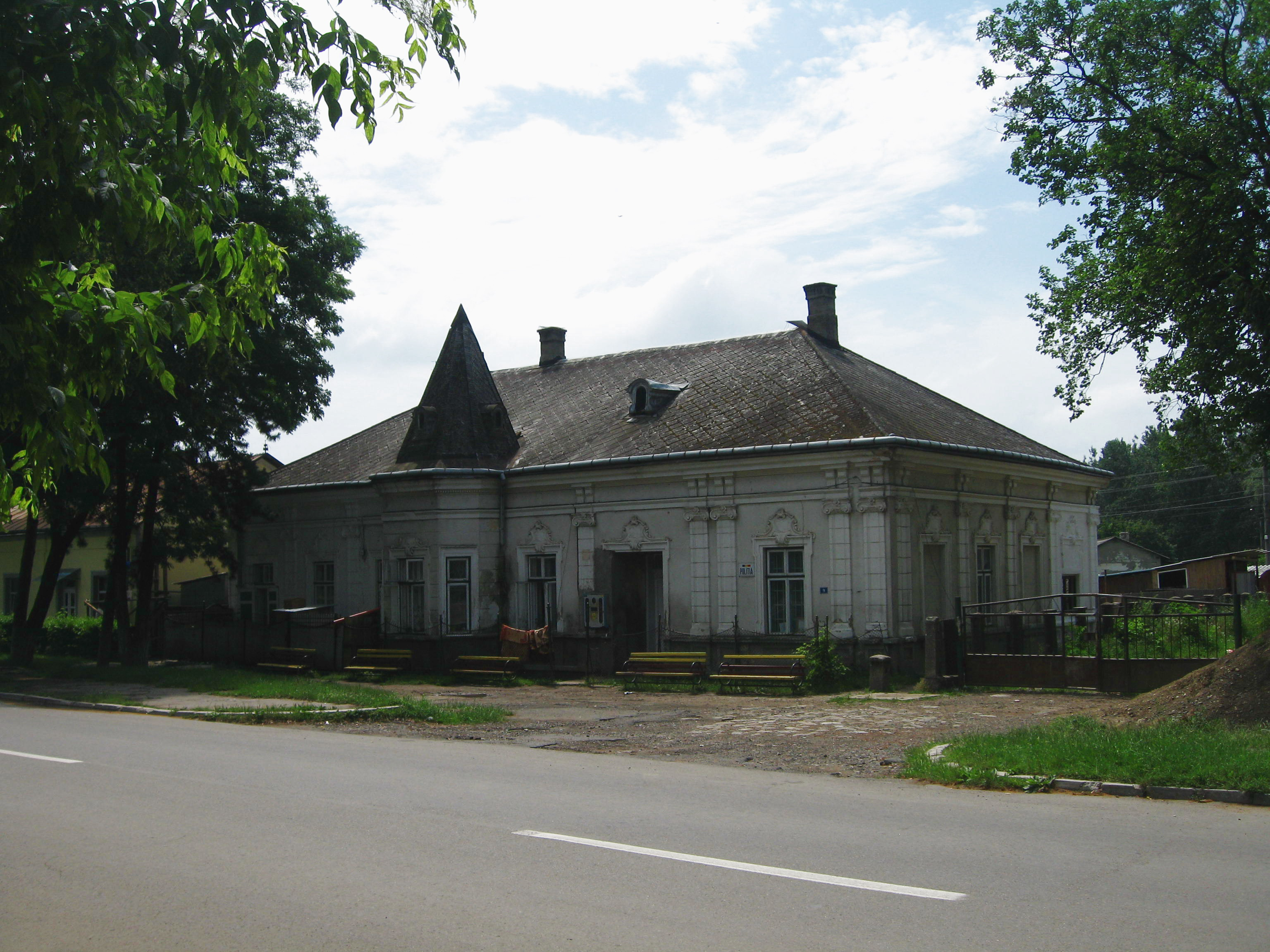
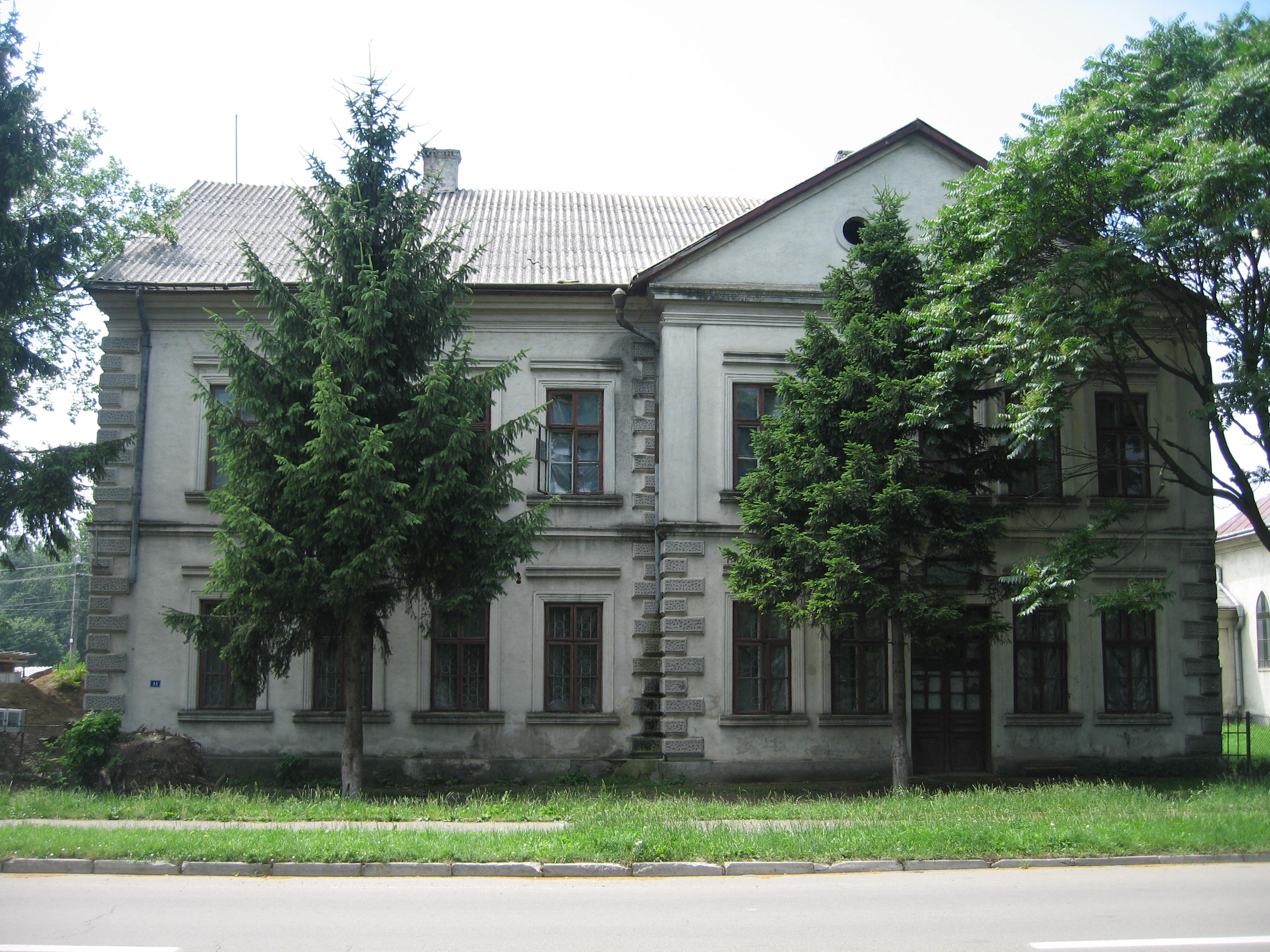
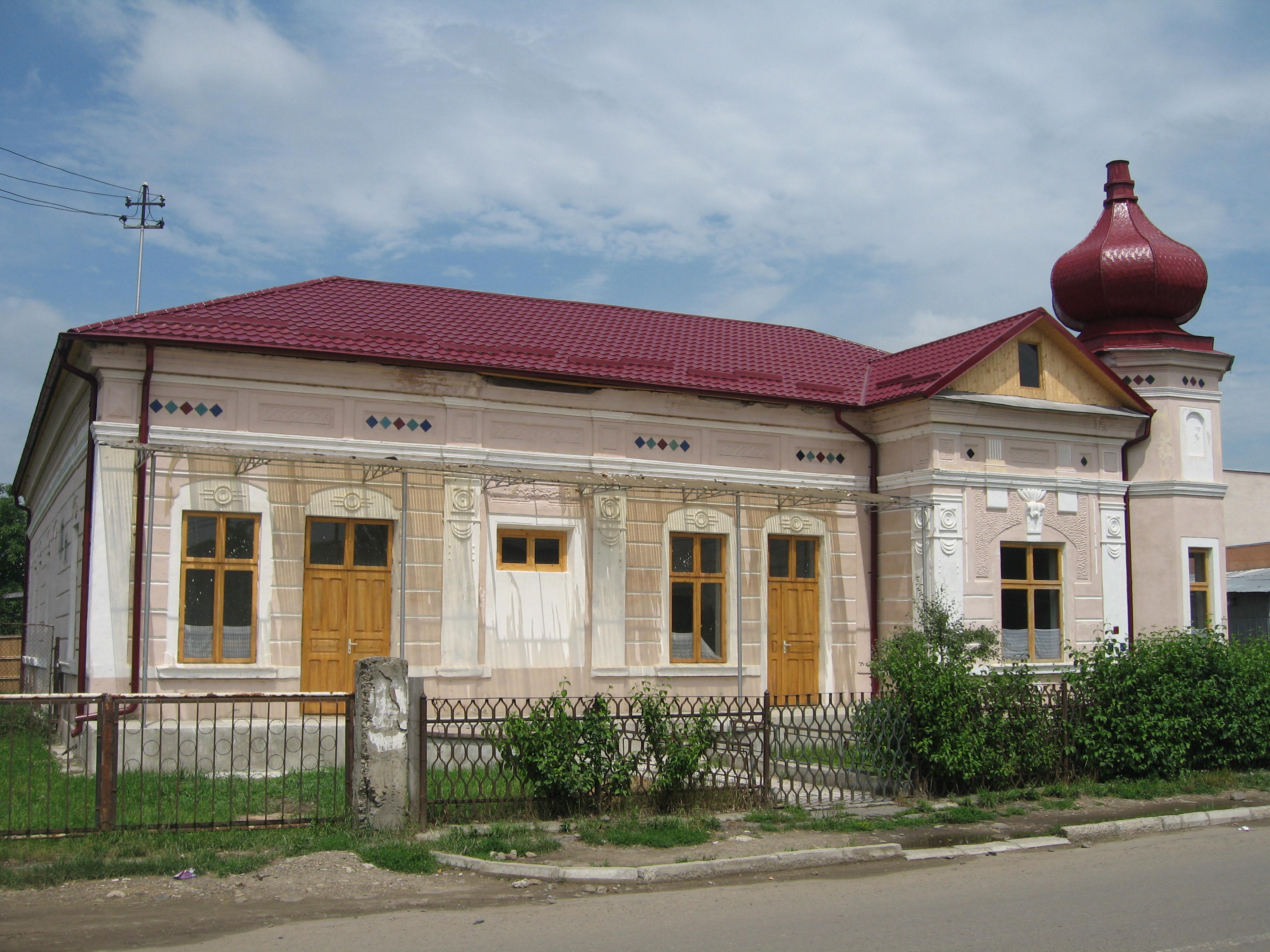
Clockwise from left to right: Suceava North railway station, former police station, the old elementary school in Ițcani, and a local Austrian-style household.

Ițcani is a neighbourhood located several miles northwest of the city centre. Initially established as a small village in the 15th century under the rulership of Alexăndrel of Moldavia, it expanded as a German-speaking colony starting in the late 19th century, seeing an influx of German settlers during the Josephine colonization which took place in the time of the Austrian Empire. The north railway station (which depicts architectural elements of both Gothic revival and Neo-romanticist styles, also the oldest in the city) is situated in this neighbourhood as well.

=== Monuments ===
Near the fortress, in Șipote-Cetate Park, there is an equestrian statue of Stephen the Great, designed and made by the local sculptor Iftimie Bârleanu in 1977. The monument has 23 meters in height, being the tallest equestrian statue in Romania. In the town centre there's also a statue dedicated to Petru Mușat, Prince of Moldavia between 1375 and 1391 and to Petru Rareș, twice Prince of Moldavia, firstly between 1527 and 1538 then secondly and for the last time between 1541 and 1546.

=== Religious buildings ===
==== Romanian Orthodox churches ====
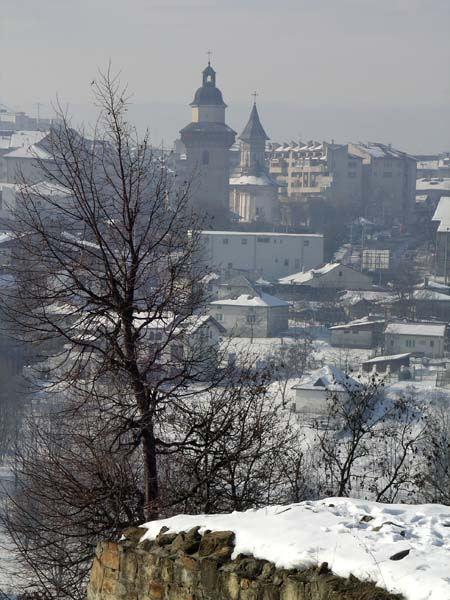
The town centre of Suceava in wintertime, with the Church of St. Demetrius and its belfry tower in the background.

One of the most important cultural sites in Suceava is Saint John the New Monastery which includes the monumental Church of Saint George, built between 1514 and 1522. The construction began during the reign of voivode Bogdan III the One-Eyed of Moldavia, after the nearby Mirăuți Church (the metropolitan cathedral of Moldavia at that moment) was devastated in 1513. The construction was completed by Stephen IV of Moldavia (also known as Ștefăniță). The monastery church served as metropolitan cathedral of Moldavia until 1677. It has frescoes painted on the outside, typical of the region, and is one of eight buildings that make up the churches of Moldavia UNESCO World Heritage Site. Since 1991 Saint John the New Monastery serves as the cathedral of the Archdiocese of Suceava and Rădăuți. Saint John the New was a Moldavian monk who preached during Turkish occupation and was subsequently martyred in Cetatea Albă, present-day Bilhorod-Dnistrovskyi in Ukraine. Alexander I of Moldavia brought his relics to Suceava in 1402.

Mirăuți Church, dedicated to Saint George, is the oldest religious building in Suceava, founded by Petru II of Moldavia in late 14th century, in the same period with the Seat Fortress, when he moved the capital from Siret to Suceava. The church established the city as a see of it. Mirăuți was the metropolitan cathedral of Moldavia between 1402 and 1522, when the church of Saint John the New Monastery was completed. In 1402, the relics of Saint John the New were transferred to this church from Cetatea Albă, and then, in 1589 transferred again to the nearby monastery church by voivode Peter the Lame. The name Mirăuți derives from the fact that it was the coronation church of Moldavia until 1522. Stephen the Great was crowned in here in 1457. After the church was devastated, it was rebuilt in early 17th century, and then, in the 18th century, abandoned.

Church of Saint Demetrius was founded by Peter IV Rareș, ruler of Moldavia (1527–1538, 1541–1546), and the son of Stephan the Great. The church was built in 1534–1535, with a bell tower added in 1560–1561 by Alexandru Lăpușneanu. The bell tower is 40 meters high, being the tallest bell tower in Suceava and a landmark of the city. The church had frescoes painted on the outside, that are still visible on one side wall. The frescoes inside were restored recently. Church of Saint Demetrius is located near the ruins of the former Princely Court of Suceava.

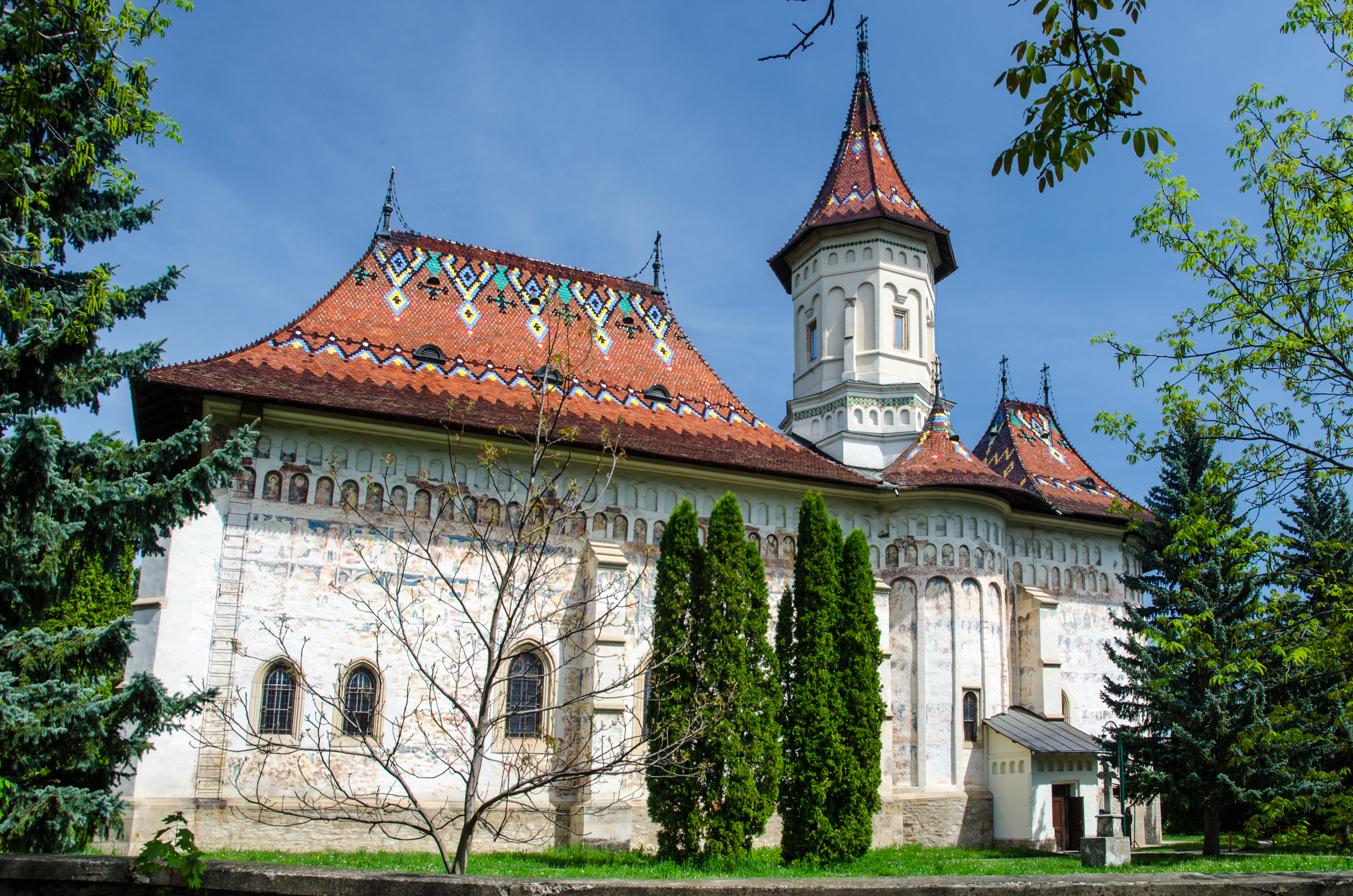
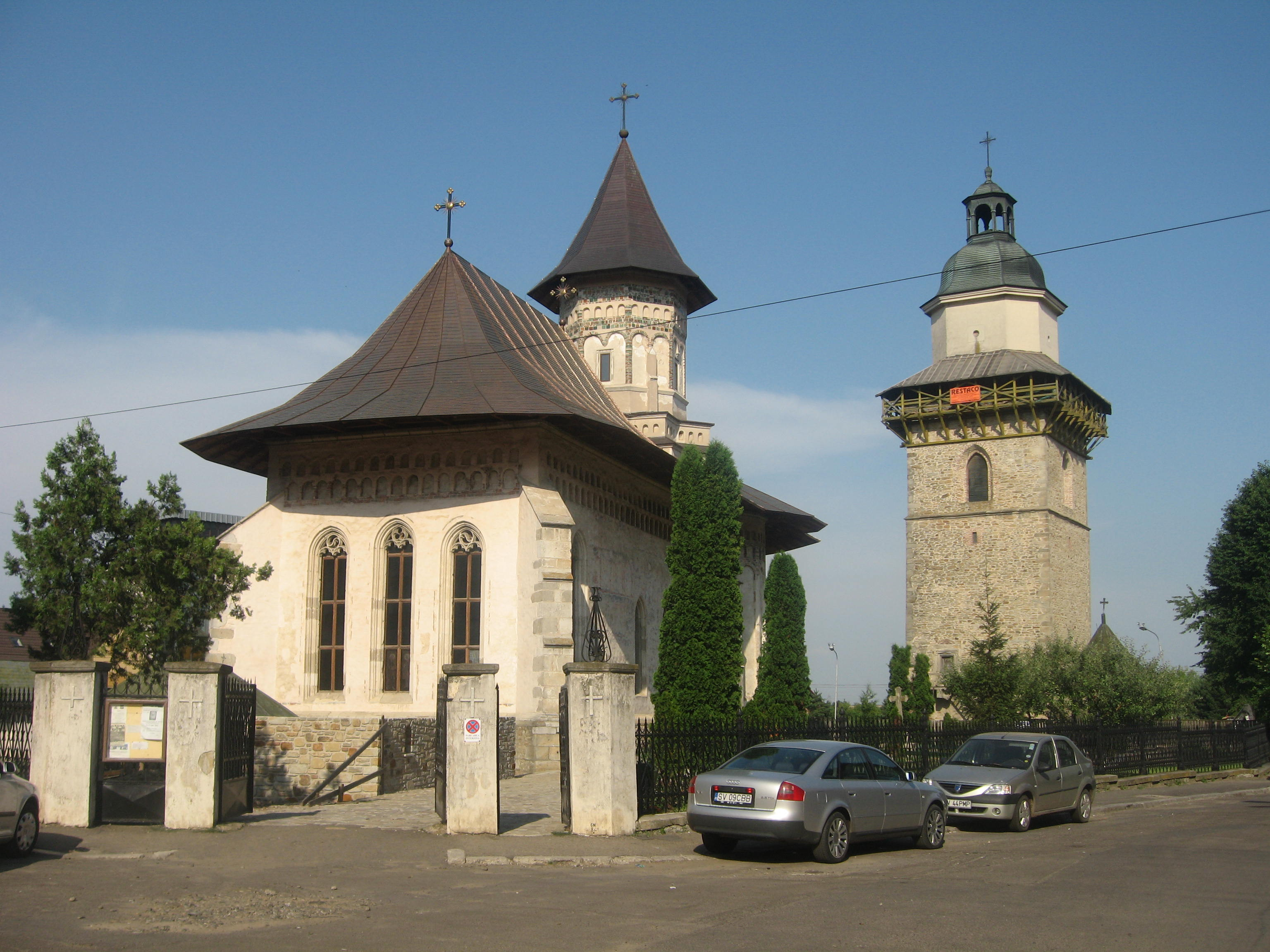
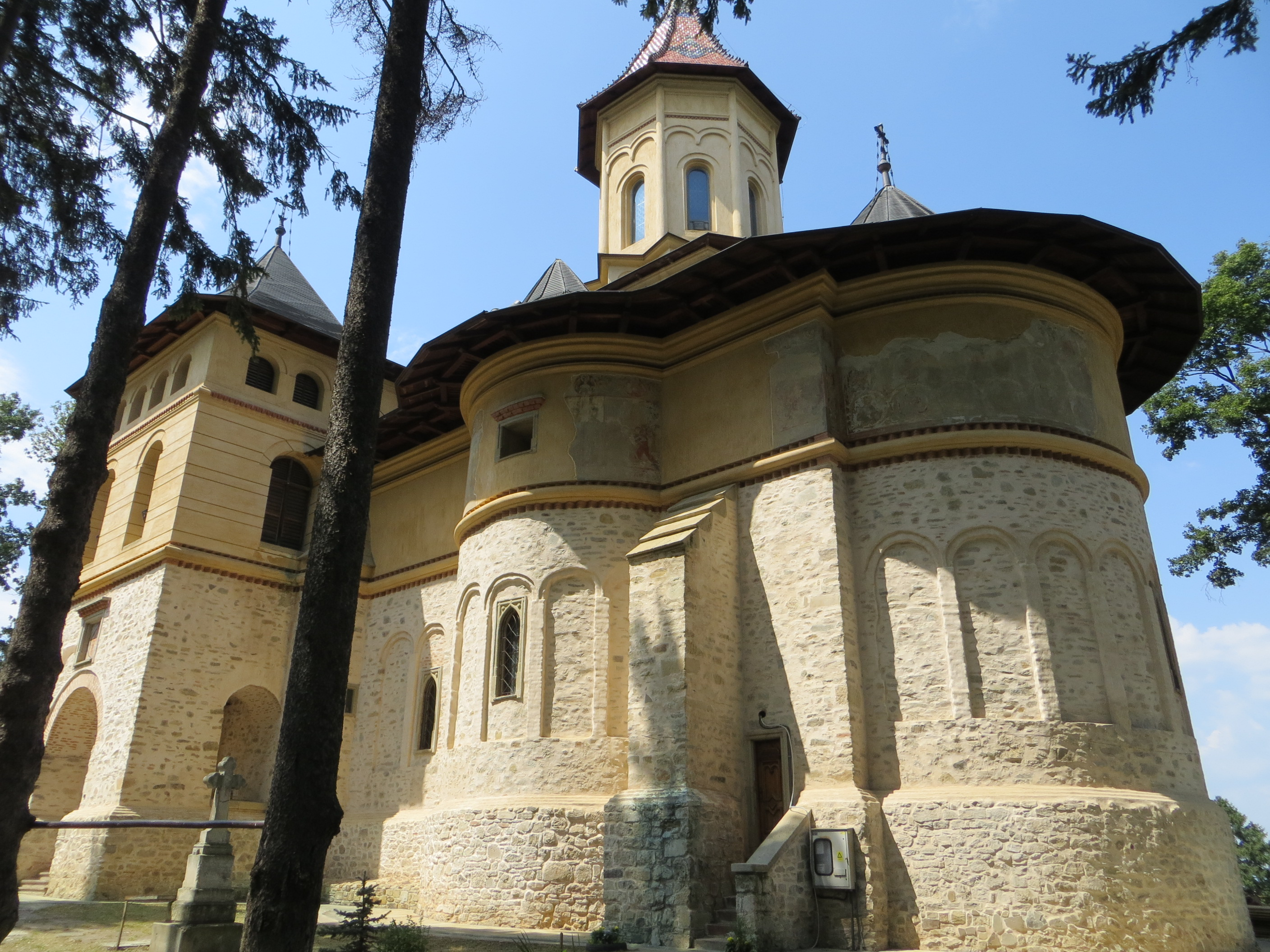
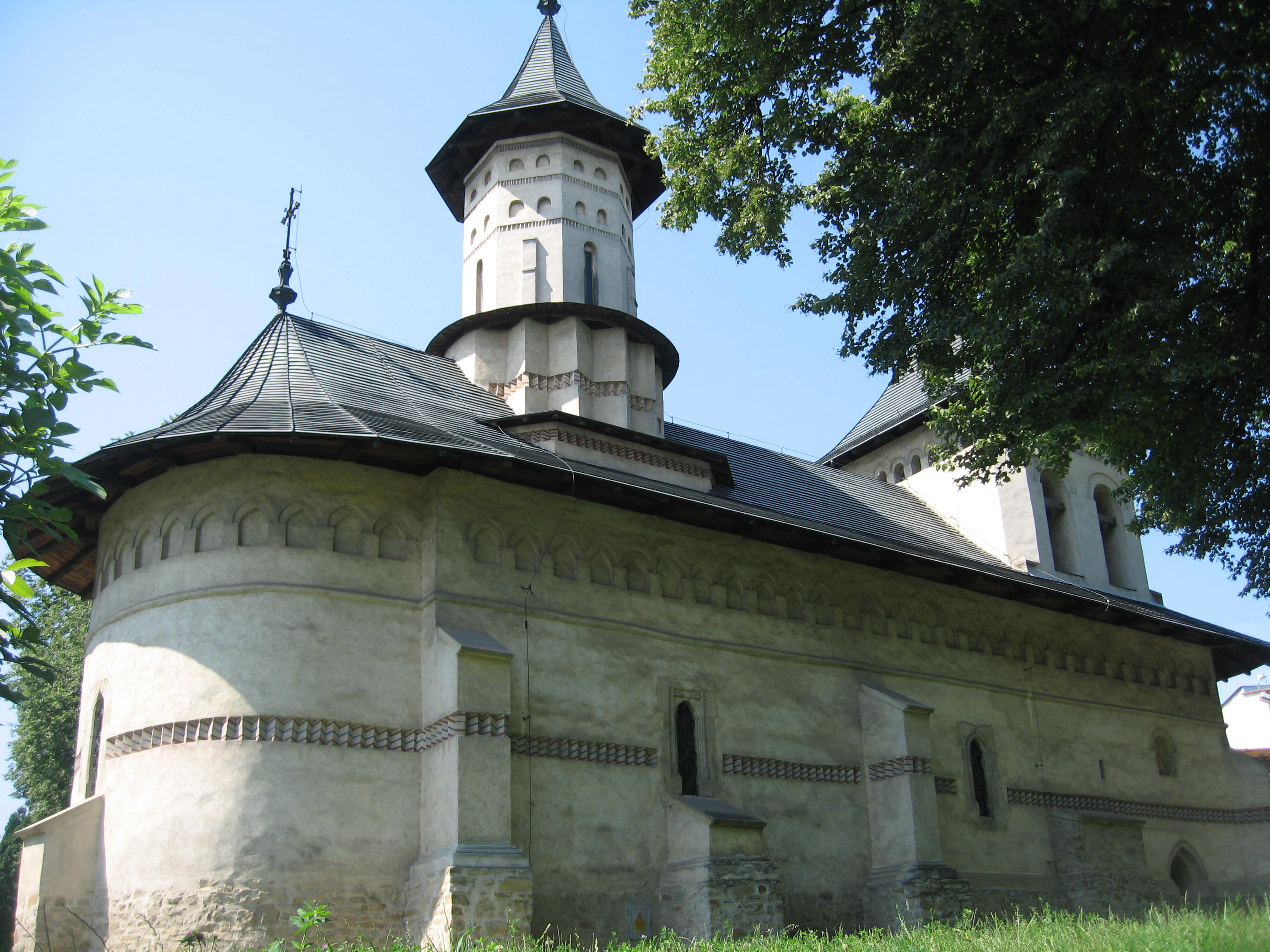
Clockwise from left to right: St. John the New Monastery (UNESCO World Heritage site), Church of St. Demetrius, Mirăuți Church, Church of St. Nicholas.

Furthermore, there is another old church near these ruins. Church of Saint John the Baptist, also known as Coconilor Church or Domnițelor Church, was founded in 1643 by Vasile Lupu, voivode of Moldavia between 1632 and 1653. It has no exterior frescoes and a short bell tower that has its roof linked with the roof above the church. In its early days, the church functioned as a chapel for the Princely Court.

Church of the Resurrection (located in the proximity of Saint John the New Monastery) dates from 1551, and was founded by Elena Rareș, the wife of voivode Peter IV Rareș. The church has no tower above the naos, its architecture reflecting the urban style of the medieval period. Instead of the bell tower, the church has a zvonnitsa, an architectural form especially used in the Russian architecture of the 14th–17th centuries. Church of the Resurrection was used by the local Roman Catholic community during the Habsburg occupation, and then by the Ruthenian Greek Catholic community, until 1936. It is also known as Văscresenia Church or Elena Doamna Church.

Church of Saint Nicholas (Prăjescu) is another religious building in Suceava that features the medieval Moldavian architectural style. The present church was rebuilt by treasurer Nicoară Prăjescu in 1611, during the reign of Constantin Movilă (1607–1611). Throughout its history, the church functioned as a necropolis for the local boyars.

Between the city center and Ițcani neighborhood, on the slopes that descend to the Suceava river valley, there is Church of the Assumption, another old Romanian Orthodox church, founded in the first half of the 17th century (1639). The church was built on the place where Ițcani Monastery existed before. It functioned as a nunnery until late 18th century. Today it is parish church, and has a zvonnitsa similar to that of Church of the Resurrection, located downtown.

In Burdujeni neighborhood, 4 km (2 mi) north-east of the city center, there is Teodoreni Monastery, founded in 1597 by local boyar Teodor Movilă, the elder brother of Ieremia Movilă, ruler of Moldavia (1595–1600, 1600–1606). Burdujeni village (now a district of Suceava) was established and developed around this monastery. The set of buildings includes Church of Ascension, the bell tower, living quarters for nuns and a surrounding wall. Just 1 km (0.6 mi) north of Teodoreni Monastery, in the old district of Burdujeni, there is Church of the Holy Trinity, founded by archimandrite Filaret Scriban in 1851.

Ițcani neighborhood has two Romanian Orthodox churches founded in the first half of the 20th century: Church of the Holy Archangels (built near Suceava North railway station, in 1933–1938) and Church of the Holy Apostles (located on European route E85 and built in 1905–1908 by the German community of Ițcani, initially as a Lutheran church).

Church of the Holy Cross, located in Pătrăuți village (a few miles north-west of Ițcani), was founded in 1487 by Stephen the Great, and is one of the monuments that make up the churches of Moldavia UNESCO World Heritage Site. Also not far away from Ițcani, there is Dragomirna Monastery, established by clergyman Anastasie Crimca in 1609. Voroneț Monastery is located 40 km (25 mi) west of Suceava, in the town of Gura Humorului.

==== German Roman Catholic and Lutheran churches ====
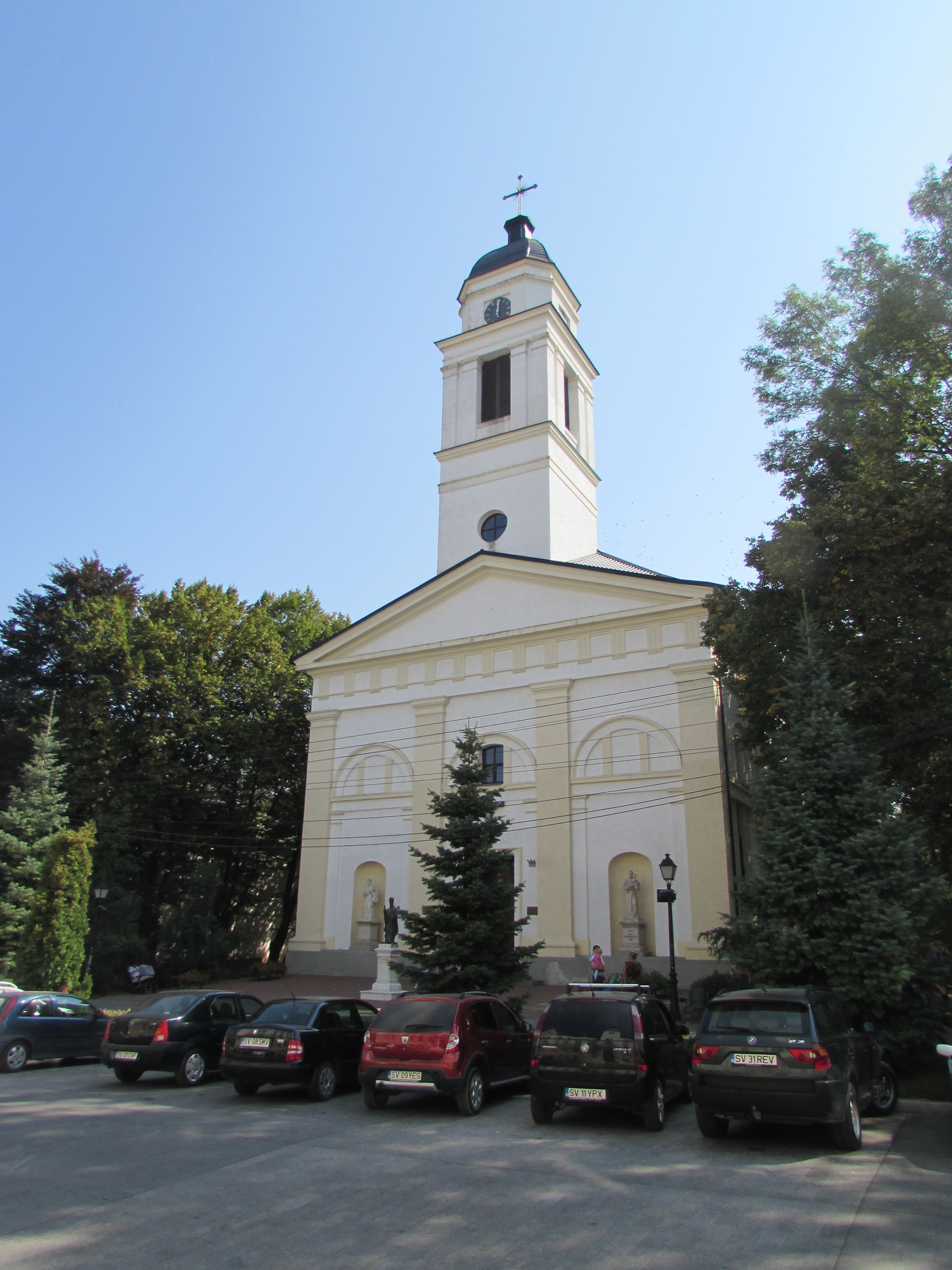
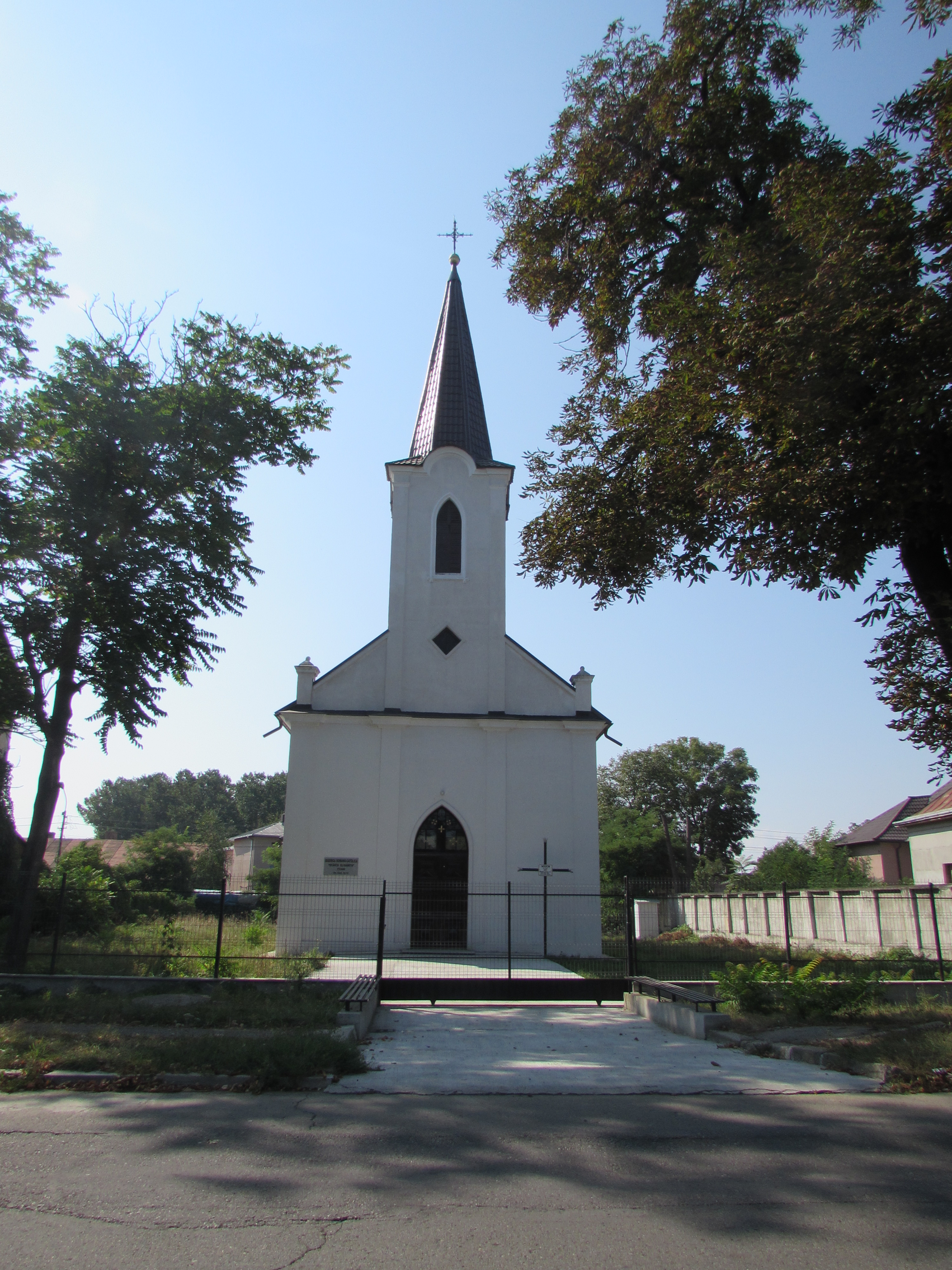
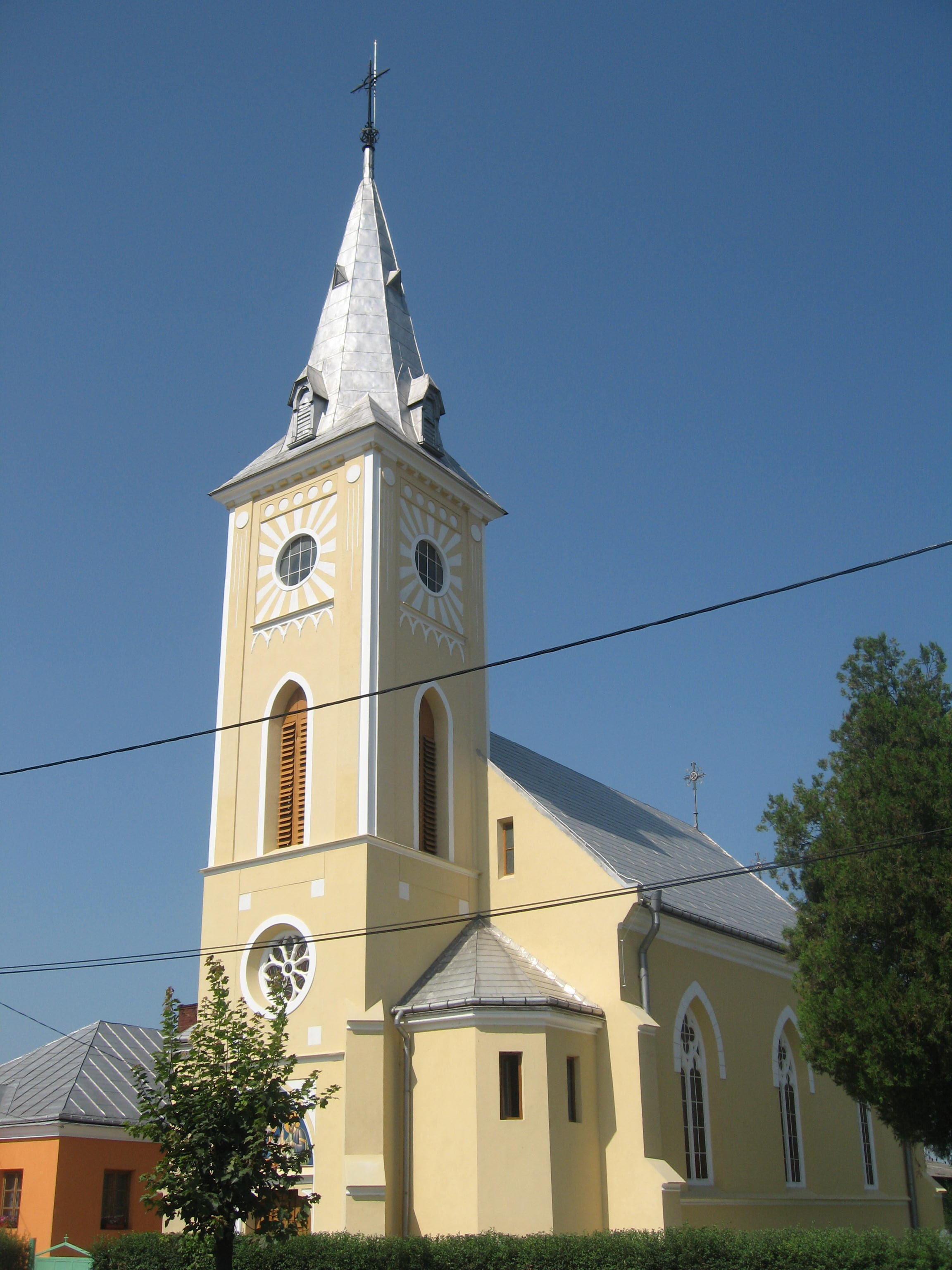
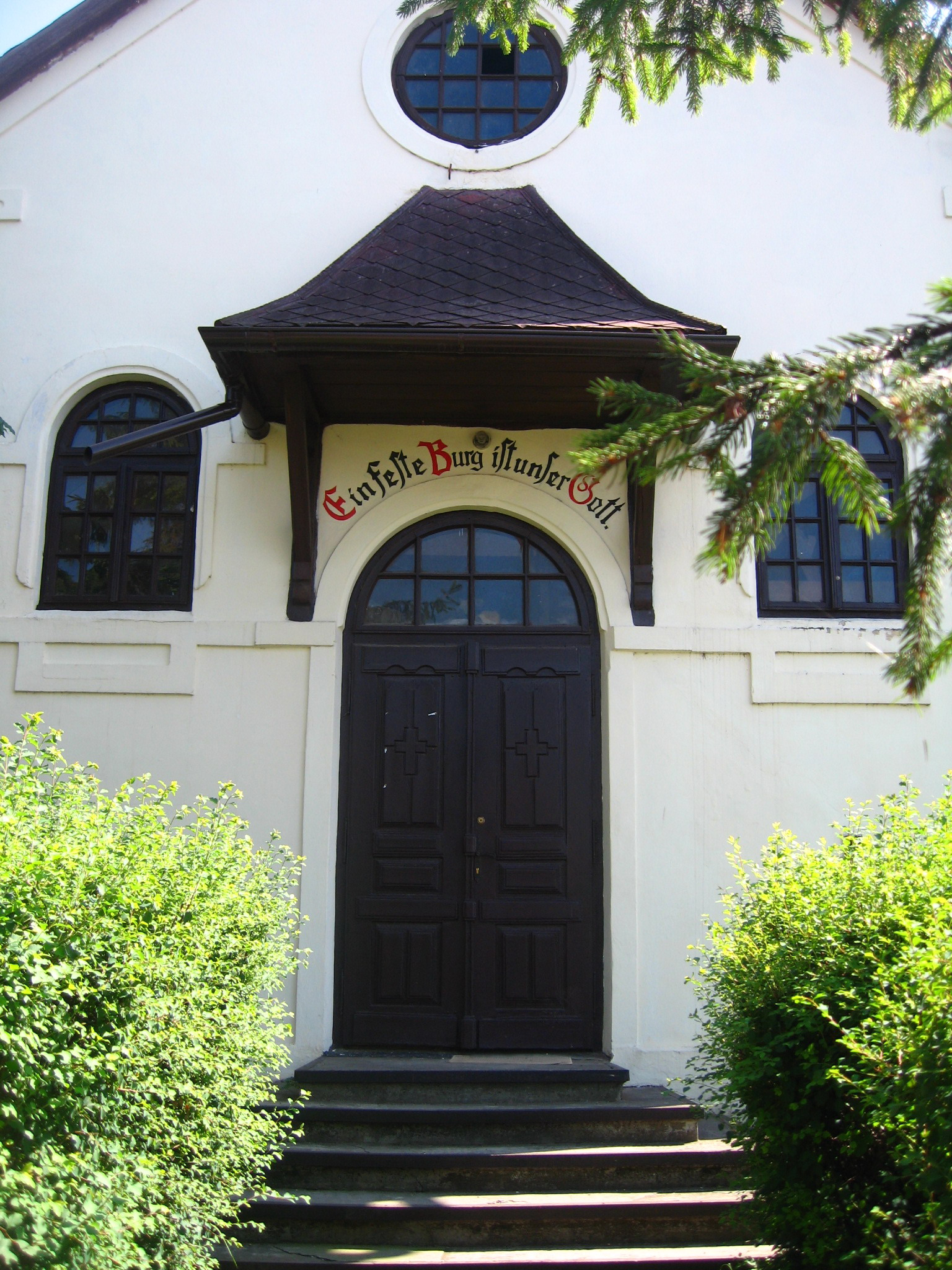
Clockwise from left to right: St. John of Nepomuk Roman Catholic Church, (Note: Situated in the town centre) St. Elizabeth Roman Catholic Church, (Note: Situated in Ițcani (now Orthodox)) St. Apostles Evangelical Lutheran Church, (Note: Situated in Ițcani (now Orthodox)) The Evangelical Lutheran Church. (Note: Situated in the town centre)

During the late Modern Age up until the early 1940s, a sizeable ethnic German community lived in the town of Suceava. They were of both Roman Catholic and Lutheran faith. These German-speaking colonists who were settled by the Austrian Empire in the town proper can trace their origins most notably to the territories of present-day southern Germany, Austria, and the Czech Republic (more specifically Bohemia or the Bohemian Forest), being thus both Roman Catholics and Protestants (more specifically Lutherans).

Several religious buildings that served both aforementioned religious denominations can still be found today both in the town proper and in the Ițcani neighbourhood, where a bygone community of ethnic Germans (stemming from the contemporary Rhineland-Palatinate land in Germany) once lived in sizeable numbers.

==== Armenian Orthodox churches ====
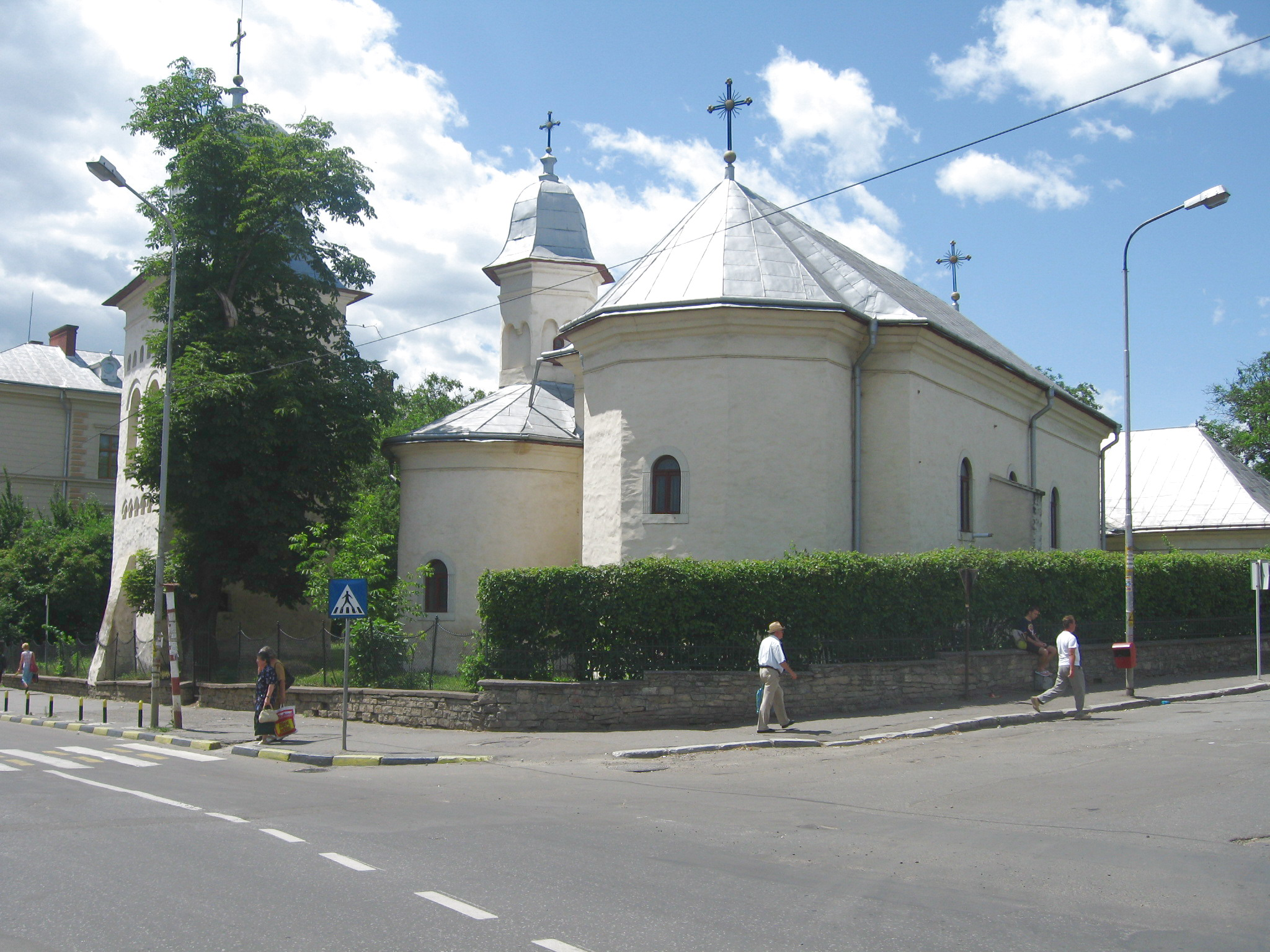
Church of the Holy Cross

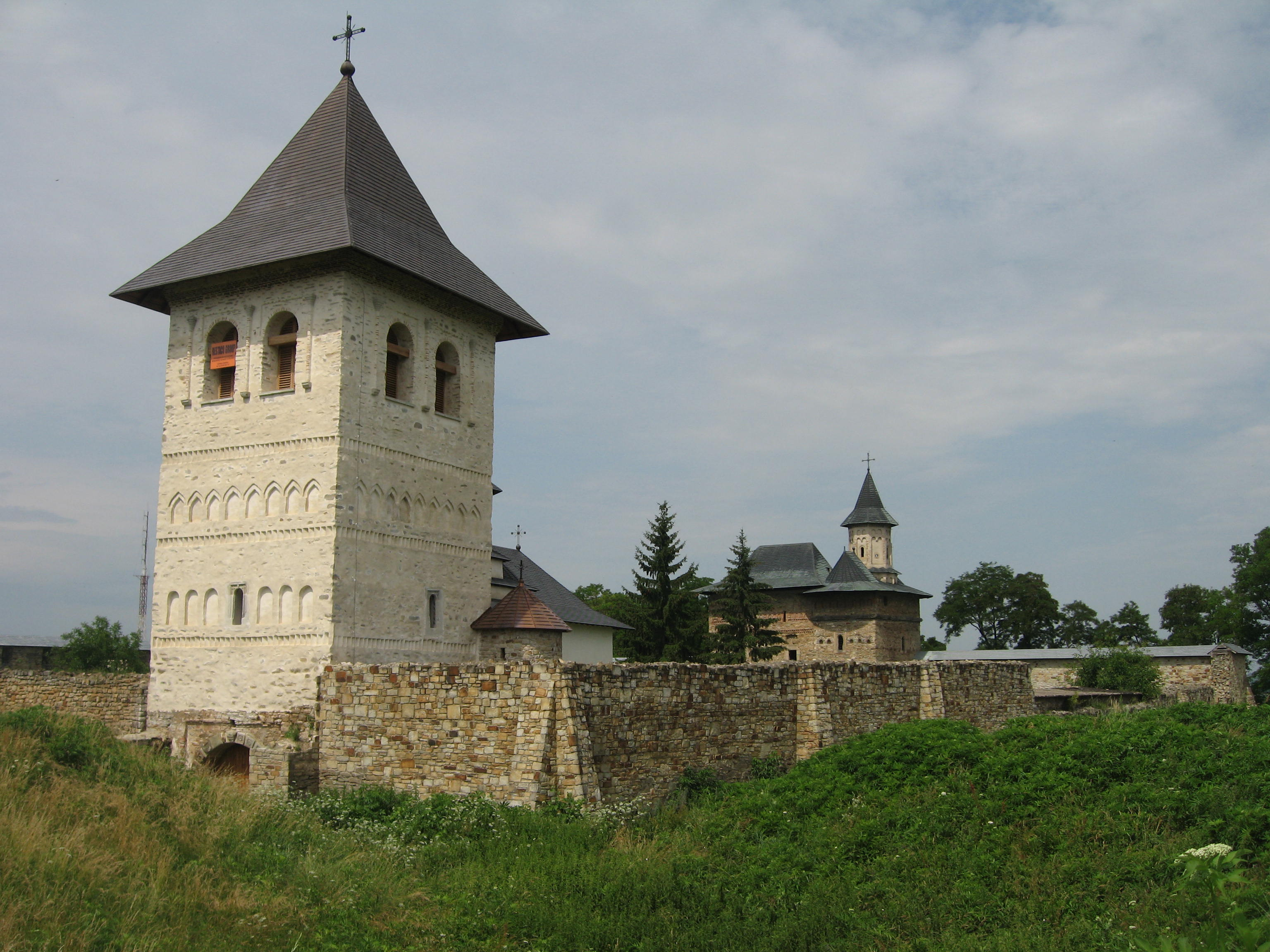
Zamca Monastery

In the past, Suceava used to have an important Armenian community as well. Their cultural and historical legacy is highlighted by a series of well preserved religious buildings that still exist to this today.

The most representative ecclesiastical landmark established by the local Armenian population is Zamca Monastery (the term Zamca can actually trace its linguistic origin to Polish, denoting as such a 'fortified place' and being named this way by King Jan Sobieski of Poland in 1691), a fortified complex of buildings located on a plateau at the western point of the contemporary city.

Zamca Monastery was constructed between 1551 and 1606 and its church is dedicated to Saint Auxentius. Along with the church, the monastery includes several buildings made of stone and a defensive wall that surrounds the whole medieval complex.

Between Zamca Monastery and the city center there are two more Armenian Orthodox churches. Church of Saint Simon (also known as The Red Tower Church because of its bell tower) was founded in 1513. The bell tower was constructed in 1551.

The church has an old Armenian cemetery in the proximity and a chapel that was built in 1902 (Pruncul Chapel). Church of the Holy Cross was established in 1521 and was renovated several times in its history. The Armenian parsonage is located near the church, along with several old tomb stones.

Hagigadar Monastery is another medieval complex built by the local Armenians. It was founded in 1512–1513, and is located on the south-western proximity of the town, on a valley near European route E85.

== Tourism ==
In the past few years Suceava started to evolve more rapidly. The most important sights in the town date from its time as a princely capital (i.e. the Middle Ages). There are numerous museums in the city proper including, most notably, the Bucovina History Museum, the Bucovina Village Museum, Bucovina Ethnographic Museum (housed in an inn dating back to the 17th century), or the Natural History Museum.

== Shopping centres ==
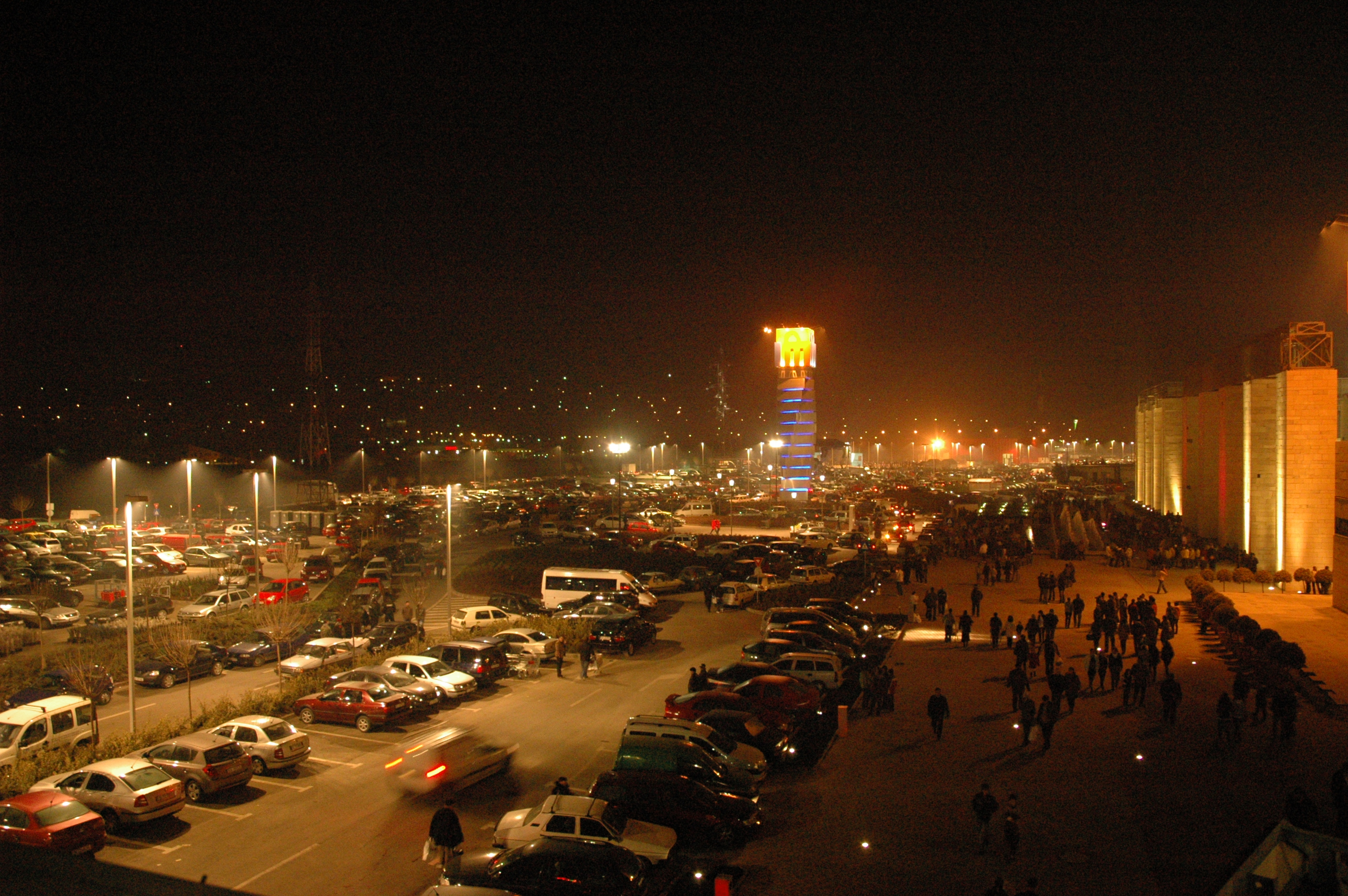
The parking lot of Iulius Mall (2008–present) at night

Galleria Shopping Center (2009–2013)

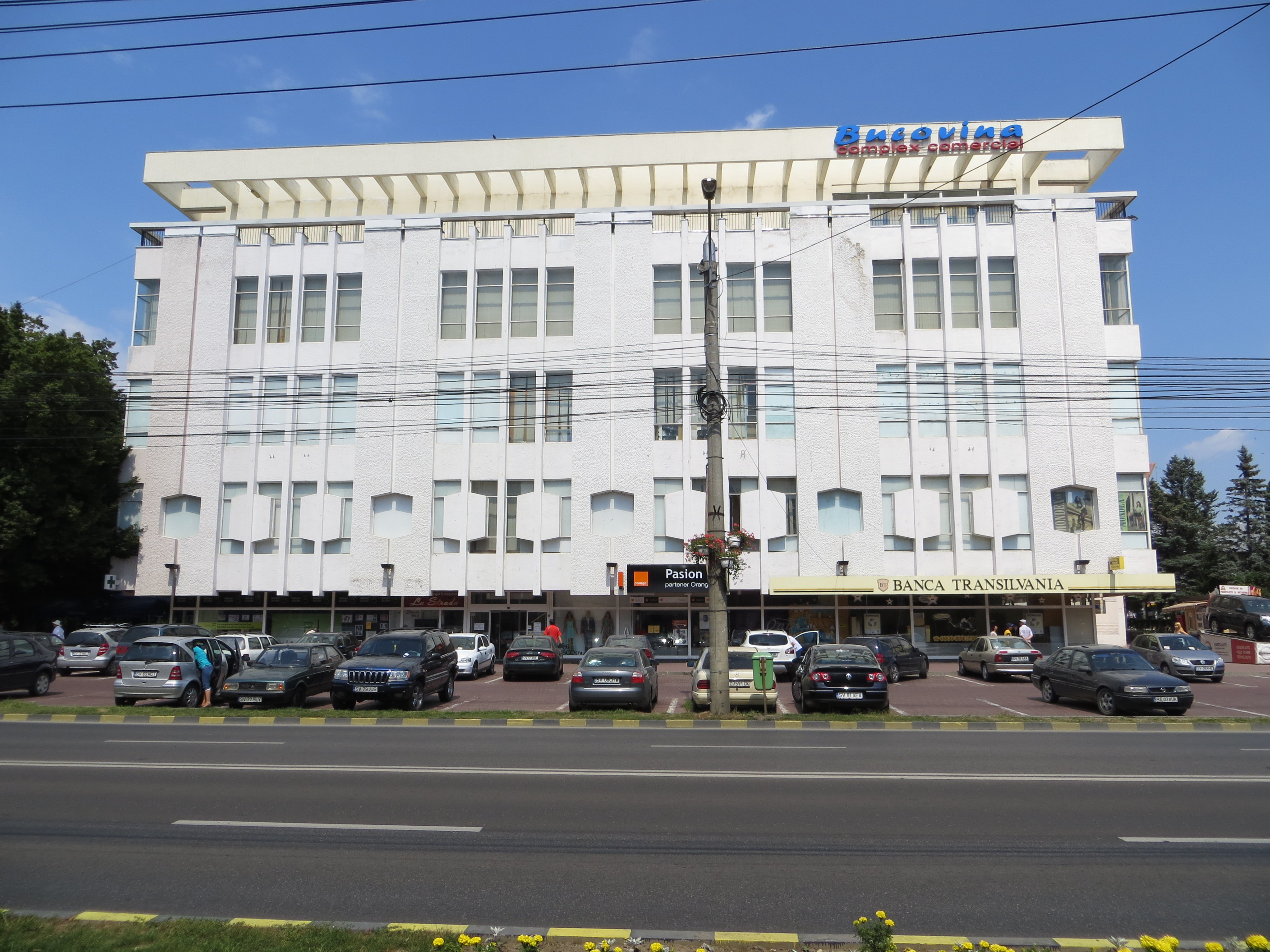
Bucovina Shopping Center (1971–present)

Suceava is renowned in Romania for having the most modern shopping centres (i.e. malls) and commercial spaces per capita. The most significant and also largest shopping centres of the town are Iulius Mall Suceava (situated closer to Ițcani), Galleria Shopping Center (outside the town proper), and Bucovina Shopping Center (located closer in the town centre). The latter was built during communist times whereas the former were both built after 1989.

The biggest and most representative shopping centre in Suceava is Iulius Mall and remains as such to this day, given the total volume of customers coming there for their needs as well as for the total amount of commercial spaces which the mall includes.

== Sports ==
=== Football ===
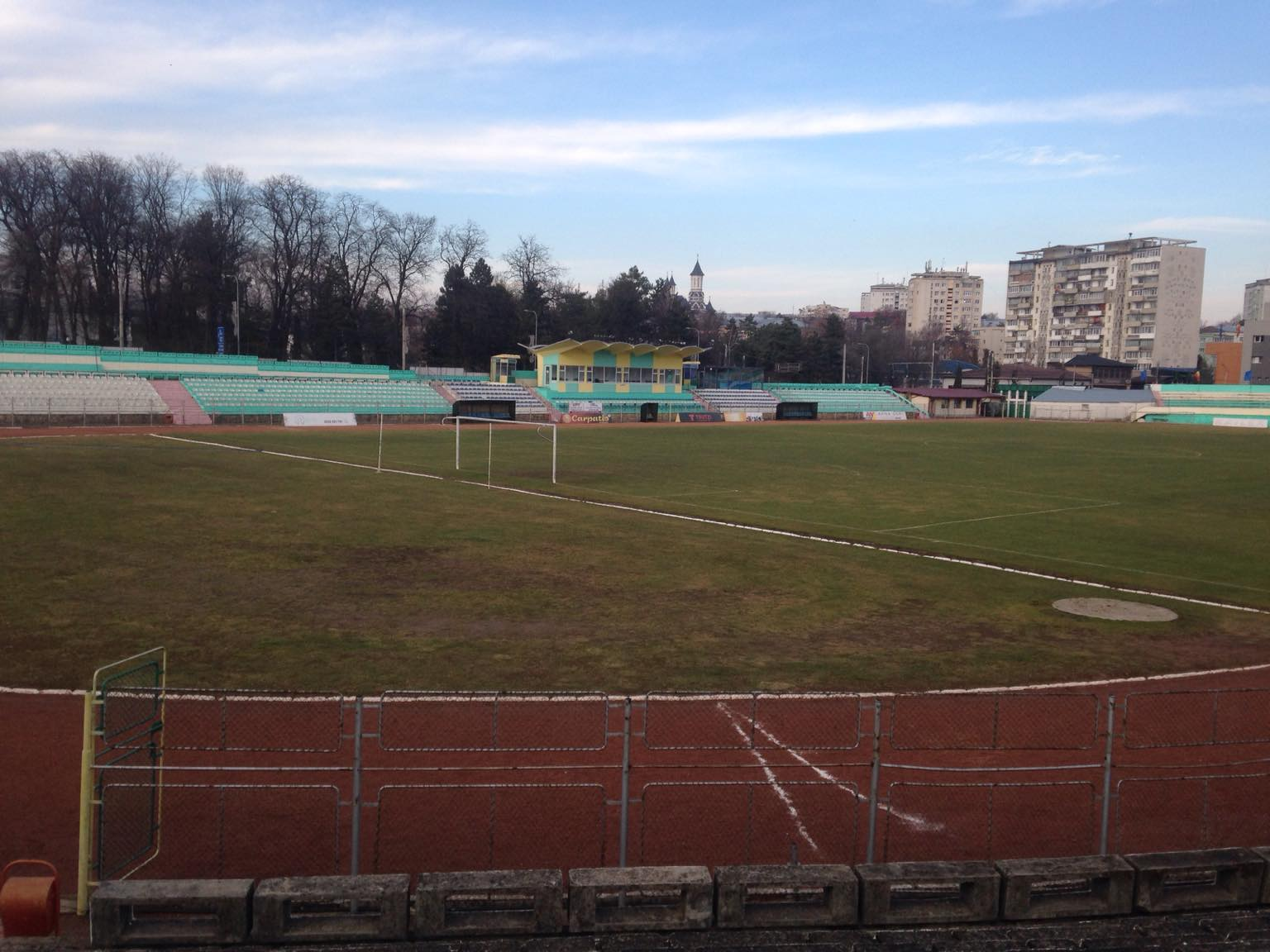
Areni Stadium, in downtown Suceava near the town hall, as seen in 2021.

ACS Foresta Suceava (Romanian: Asociația Club Sportiv Foresta Suceava), formerly known as Rapid CFR Suceava, currently plays in Liga III, the third tier of the Romanian football system.

The town has also had other significant football clubs competing in either Liga I or Liga II such as CSM Suceava, FC Cetatea Suceava, or Foresta Suceava, the last initially based in the city of Fălticeni from the same county. The town also used to have another Liga III side, Sporting Suceava, but it went bankrupt.

All the major sporting events are hosted on the Areni Stadium, a multi-purpose stadium with a capacity of 12,500 people. It is currently the home ground of ACS Foresta Suceava. The stadium was initially opened in 1963 as the "Municipal Stadium".

=== Handball ===
CS Universitatea Bucovina Suceava is the town's men's handball team which currently competes in the Romanian Handball League (Romanian: Liga Națională). It was founded in 2002 and it started playing in the first tier of the Romanian handball system in 2006. In 2011, it achieved its greatest performance to date, namely finishing 3rd in the national handball division.

== Education ==
Ștefan cel Mare University of Suceava in 2023

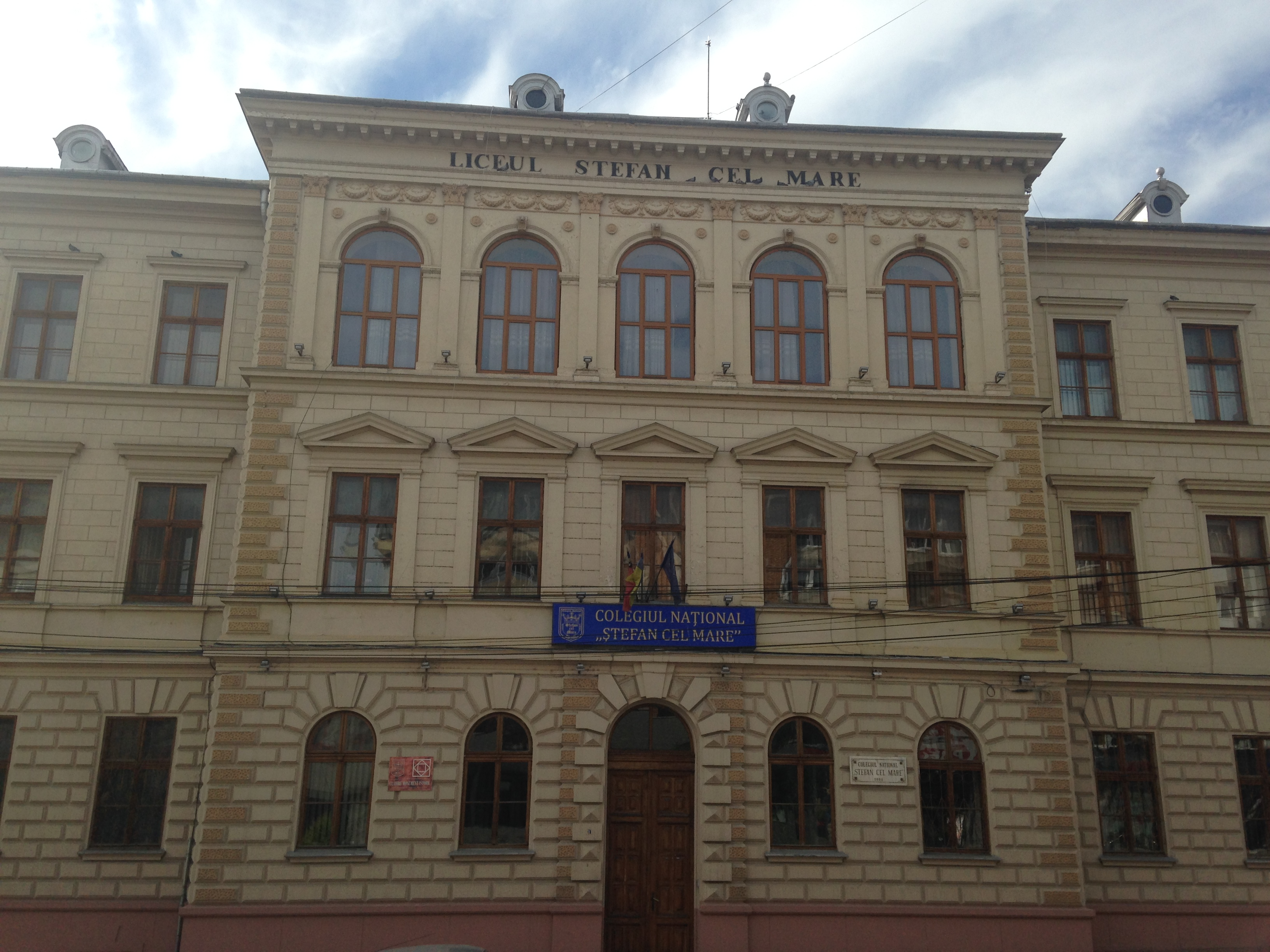
Ștefan cel Mare National College in 2020

The only university of the town is the Ștefan cel Mare University of Suceava (Romanian: Universitatea "Ștefan cel Mare" din Suceava, USV) which was established in 1990. However, this institution of higher education was initially founded as the Institute of Pedagogy as early as 1963.

The most prominent high schools with theoretical pathways of the town are the following ones:

National College "Mihai Eminescu" Suceava

- Named after the most well-known Moldavian and Romanian poet, Mihai Eminescu
- Main study offers are: Social Sciences, Mathematics and Computer Science, and Philology

National College "Petru Rareș" Suceava

- Named after the voievod of Moldavia, Peter IV Rareș
- Main study offers are: English, Philology, Mathematics and Computer Science.

National College "Ștefan cel Mare" Suceava

- Named after the prince of Moldavia between the years 1457 and 1504, Stephen III of Moldavia (also known as Stephen the Great)
- Main study offers are: Natural Sciences, Mathematics and Computer Science.

Economical College "Dimitre Cantemir" Suceava

- Named after the twice Prince of Moldavia and the famous writer of Descriptio Moldavie, Dimitrie Cantemir.
- It is the only economics high-school in Suceava.
- Main study offers are Tourism, Gastronomy, Alimentation, Economy, Countability, and Trade.
- The main profile which the school promovates is the Technical profile.

== Transportation ==
=== Public transport ===
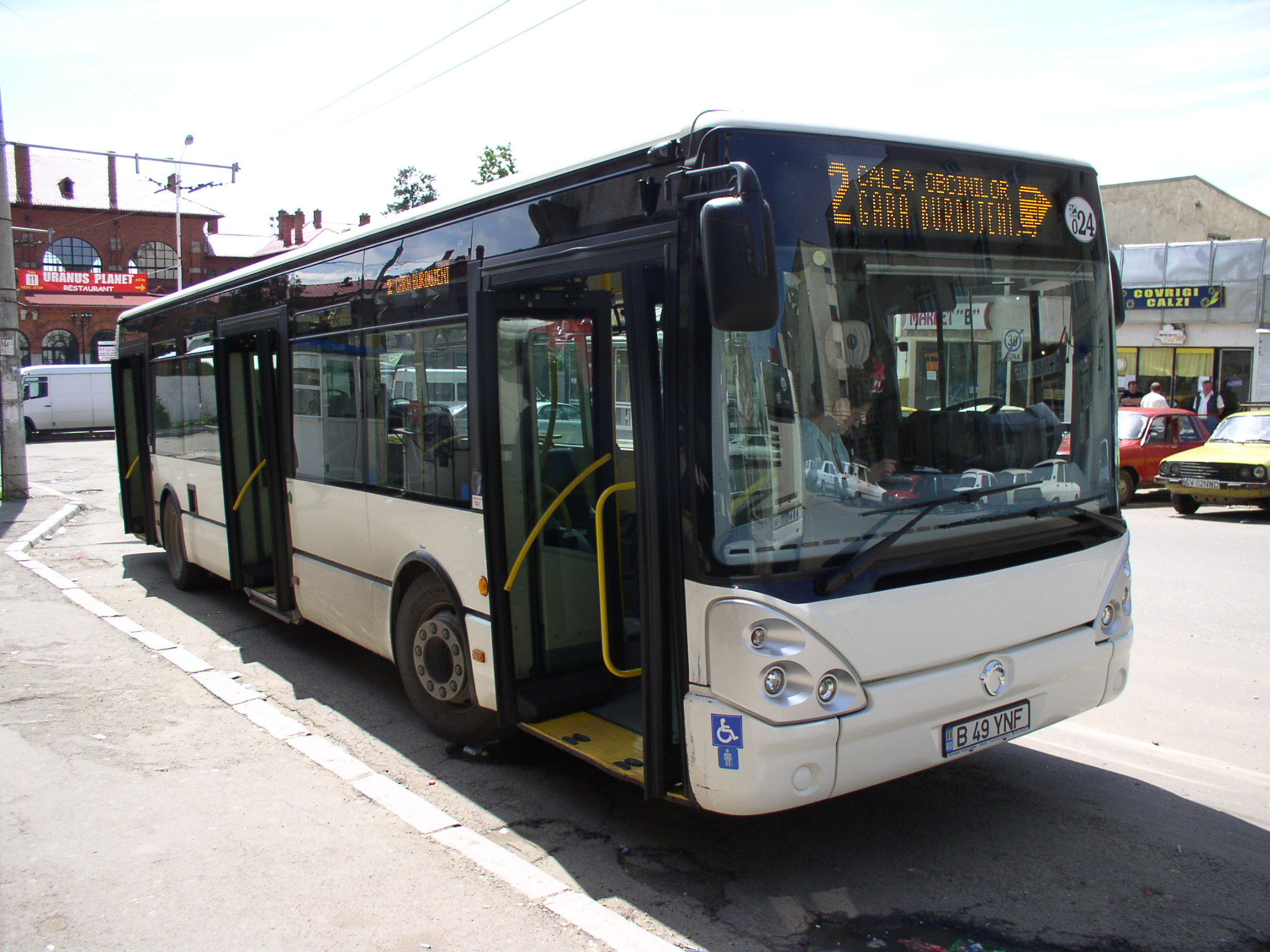
Irisbus near Burdujeni train station (2000s)

In terms of public transportation, the Municipality of Suceava currently has a series of green electric buses within its public transportation fleet with the support of Switzerland. In the past, there were both buses and trolleybuses in circulation across the town and in the neighbouring localities. The trolleybus system of the town was officially opened on 15 August 1987 and was officially closed on 2 April 2006.

Nowadays, public transportation is mostly modern and meets efficient technical standards. The type of buses which were in service and operated across the town before the arrival of the green buses were of Irisbus type. As of 2023, the town's fleet of electric buses stops around various stations both across the town and outside of it in the nearby localities (e.g. in Șcheia). The main operator of public transportation in Suceava is SC Transport Public Local SA (TPL).

=== Air ===
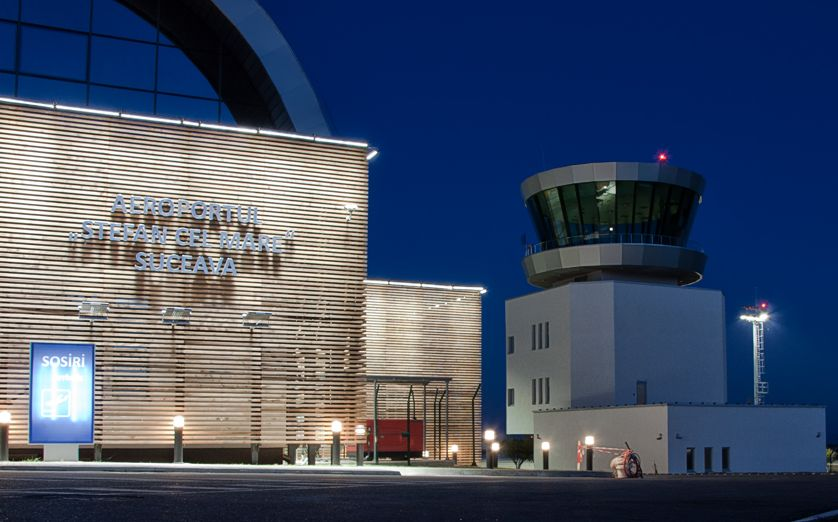
Suceava Ștefan cel Mare International Airport – new TWR and main terminal building in 2015.

Suceava is served by the Suceava International "Ștefan cel Mare" Airport (SCV), located 12 km (7.5 mi) east of the town centre, in the nearby small town of Salcea. The airport initially opened in 1962 when commercial services started with TAROM, the oldest operating Romanian airline. In 1963, the runway was paved, and an apron was built. Services by TAROM were discontinued in 2001, but resumed in 2004. During this period, the airport was only served by Angel Airlines. In March 2005, the airport was renamed Ștefan cel Mare Airport, and opened to international traffic.

In 2013, Suceava International Airport started a plan (worth c. €39 million) to rebuild and extend the old runway of 1,800 m (5,906 ft), to construct a new control tower and to install a new ILS system. In August 2013, the construction works commenced, and on 12 January 2014, the airport closed to allow the runway works to resume. The old concrete runway was completely removed, and a new asphalt runway was constructed.

On 25 October 2015, the airport was officially reopened. As of 2019, Suceava International Airport had an annual traffic of 430,064 passengers, a local record thus far, making it the 8th busiest airport in Romania.

== Natives ==
Intellectuals and artists
  - Marius Babias, art critic, author, and curator (director of Neuer Berliner Kunstverein since 2008)
  - Iosif Berman, photographer and journalist during the interwar period
  - Eugeniu Botez (nom de plume Jean Bart), writer
  - Olga Bucătaru, actress
  - Stela Cheptea, historian and medievalist
  - Vladimir Găitan, actor
  - Norman Manea, writer and intellectual
  - Ioan Nemeș, physicist and biologist
  - George Ostafi, abstract painter
  - Gheorghe Panaiteanu Bardasare, painter
  - Nicolae Picu, violinist
  - Pamfil Polonic, archaeologist and topographer
  - Ioana Rostoș (nom de plume Jane Rostos), writer
  - Ludwig Adolf Staufe-Simiginowicz, poet and German language teacher
Sportsmen
  - Daniel Bălan, football player and coach
  - Petru Bălan, rugby union footballer
  - Cristian Mugur Bolohan, former football player and coach
  - Alexandru Buziuc, football player
  - Ionuț Dimofte, rugby union football player
  - Irina Dorneanu, Olympic rower
  - Iulian Dumitraș, rugby union football player
  - Dorin Goian, former football player and coach
  - Lucian Goian, football player
  - Cătălin Golofca, football player
  - Lidia Havriștiuc, football player
  - Aleksandru Longher, football player
  - Paul Mateciuc, football player
  - Cosmin Pașcovici, former football player
  - Anca Polocoșer, handball player
  - Doru Popadiuc, football player
  - Mihai Roman, football player
  - Tiberiu Serediuc, football player
  - Ovidiu Slușariuc, former rugby union football player
  - Sonia Ursu-Kim, basketball player
Clergymen
  - Dimitrie Barilă, 17th century Moldavian Metropolitan, scholar, poet, and translator
  - Iosif Bobulescu, 19th century bishop
  - Anastasie Crimca, 16th century Eastern Orthodox clergyman, calligrapher, illuminator, and writer
  - Peter Mogila, 17th century theologian
  - Eugen J. Pentiuc, theologian, dean of Hellenic College
  - Shulem Moskovitz, chasidic Rebbe
  - Filaret Scriban, 19th century theologian
  - Meir Shapiro, Hasidic rabbi and rosh yeshiva
Politicians
  - Luca Arbore, 15th–16th century Moldavian boyar, diplomat, and statesman
  - Cristian Adomniței, former PNL Minister of Education (2007–2008)
  - Eugen Bejinariu, former PSD acting Prime Minister (2004)

== International relations ==
=== Consulates and embassies ===
- Consulate general of Ukraine

=== Twin towns – sister cities ===
Suceava is twinned with:

- Bethlehem, Palestine
- Chernivtsi, Ukraine
- Chișinău, Moldova
- Karavas, Cyprus
- Laval, France
- Mahala, Ukraine
- Soroca, Moldova
- Sosnowiec, Poland
- Yinchuan, China

=== Other partnerships ===
In addition to the town twinning, Suceava shares a series of regional, cultural, and economic partnerships with the following urban settlements or regions:

- Germany, Baden-Württemberg, and Bavaria – economic, cultural, and touristic contacts with the historical region of Swabia. Furthermore, there is also an academic partnership with the Bukowina Institut of the University of Augsburg from Augsburg.
- Denmark – local development partnership with the town of Aalborg, North Jutland
- Italy – local development partnership with the city of Naples, Campania
- United Kingdom – local development partnership with the city of Liverpool, North West England
- France – local development partnership with the city of Lyon, Auvergne-Rhône-Alpes

== Gallery ==
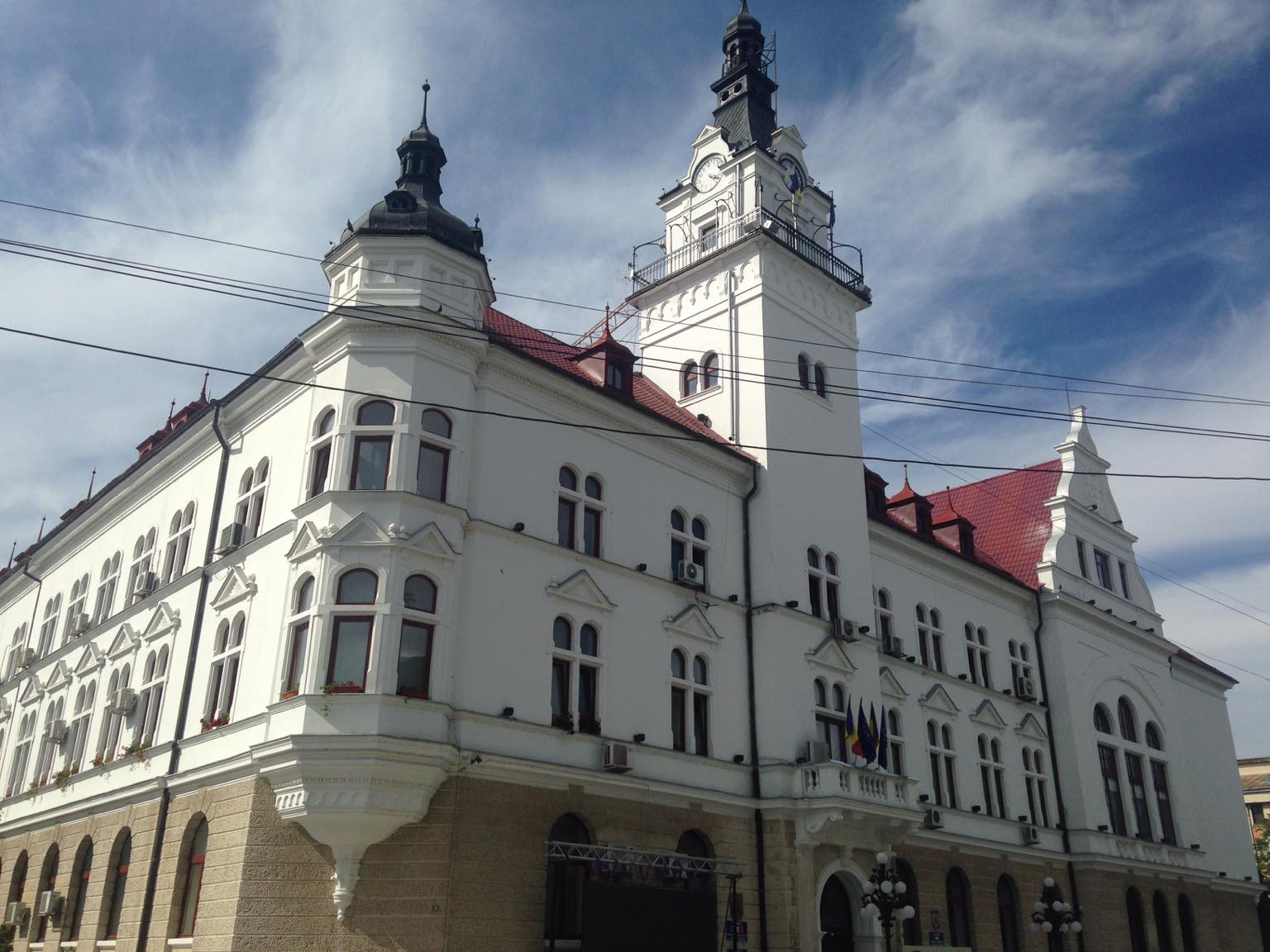
The Administrative Palace (as seen in August 2020)

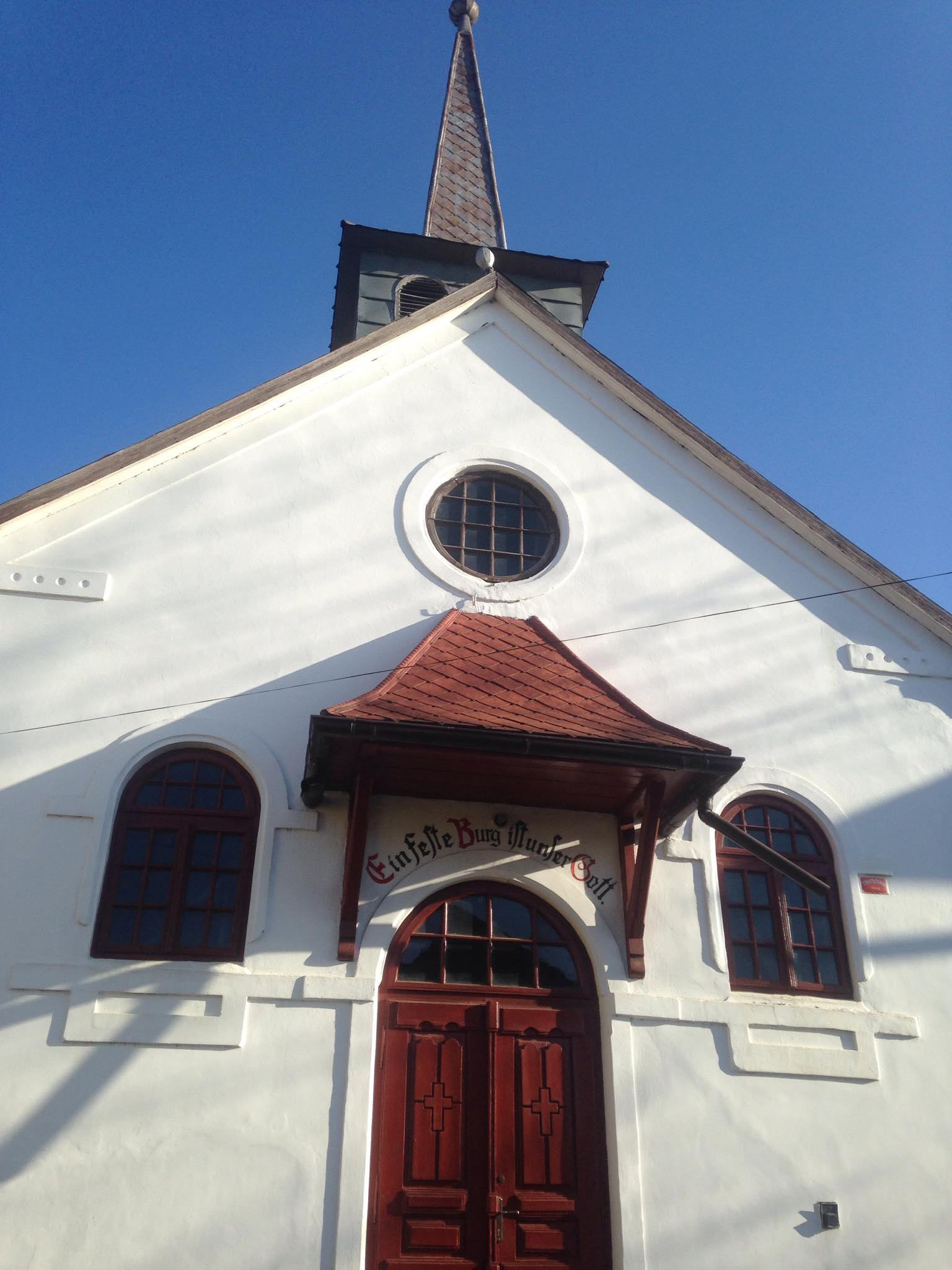
The Evangelical Lutheran Church belonging to the German community in the town

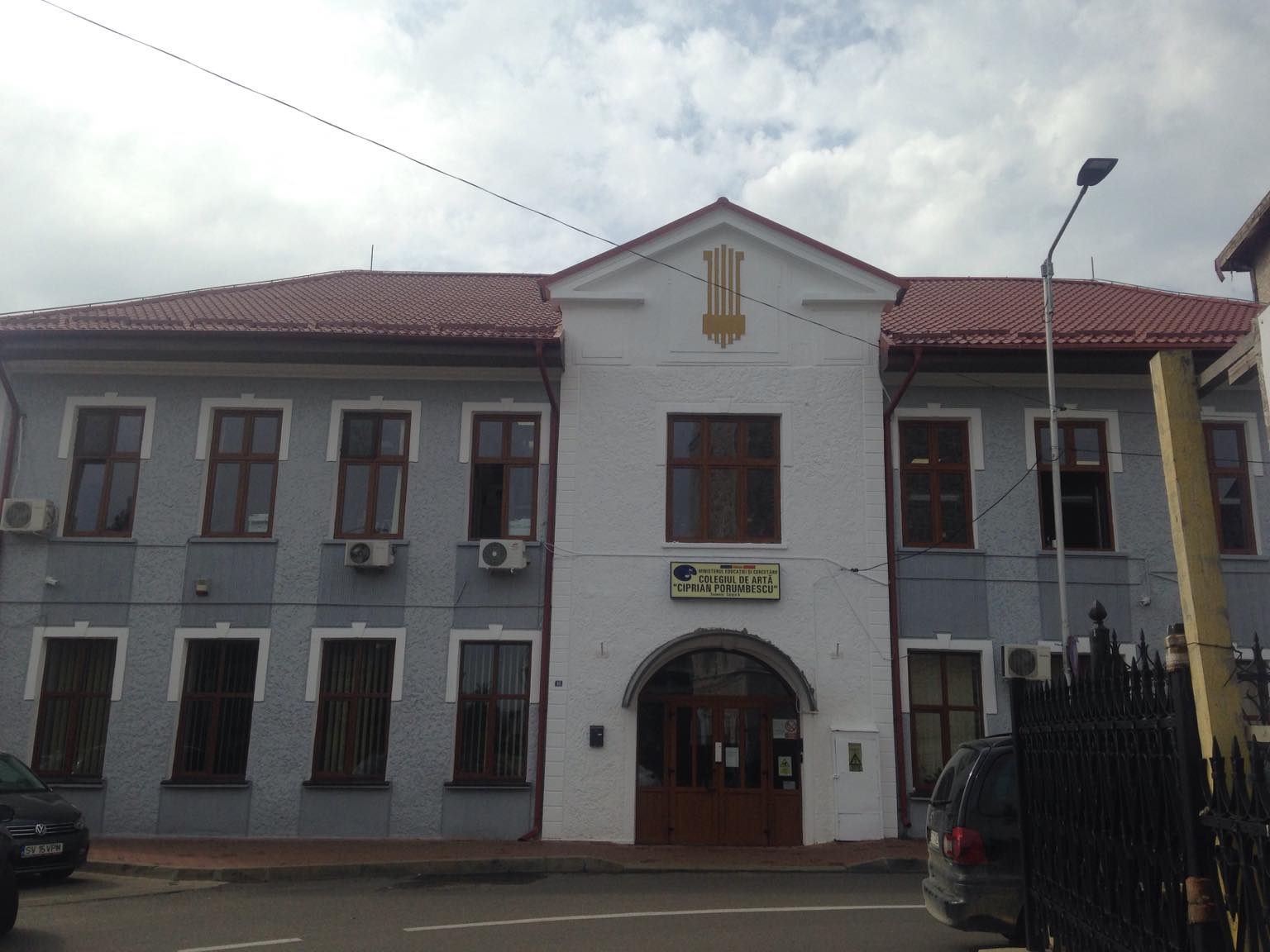
Ciprian Porumbescu Art College, former German-language high school for girls (German: Mädchen Lyzeum) founded in 1904

Bukovina History Museum at night

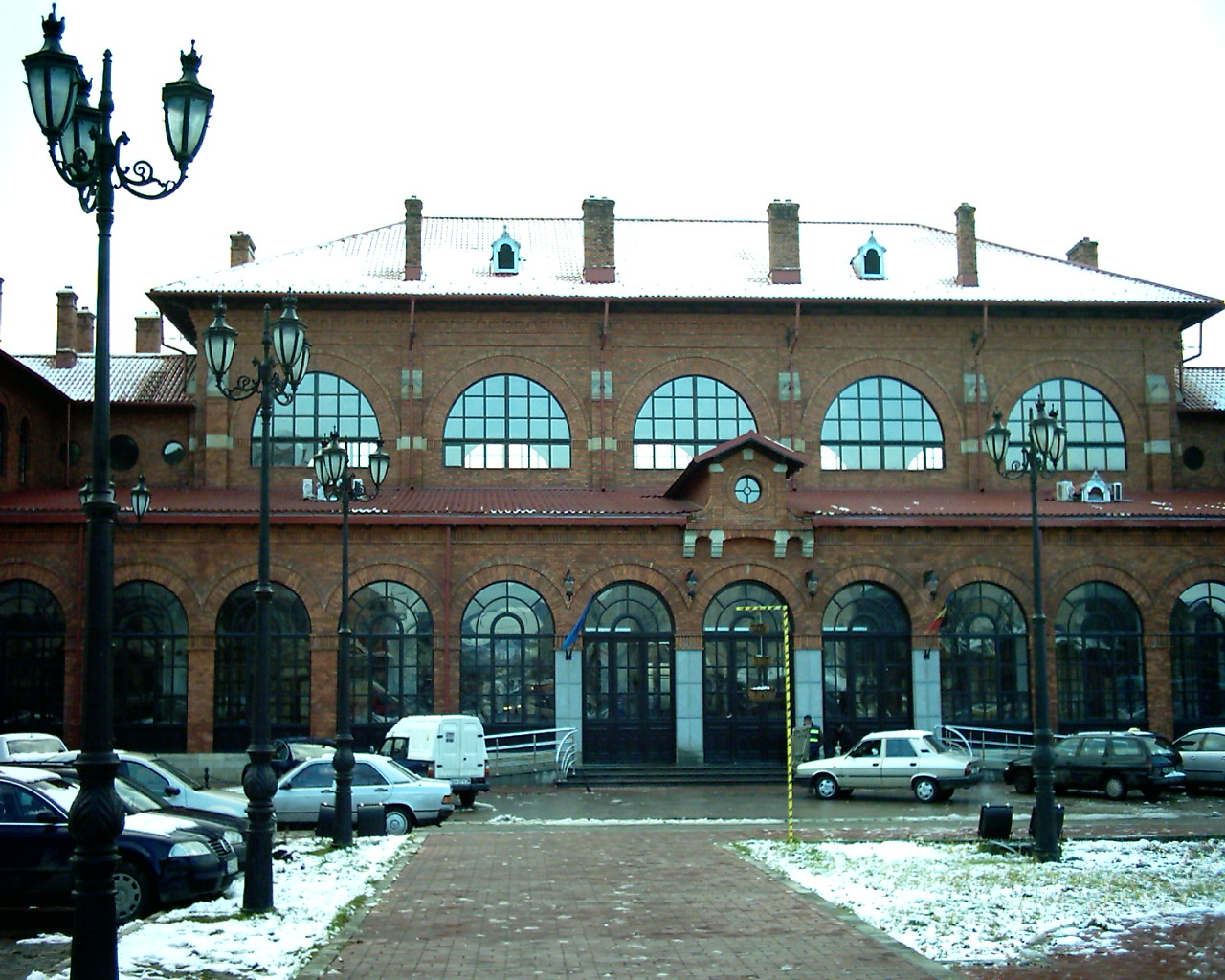
Burdujeni railway station in wintertime

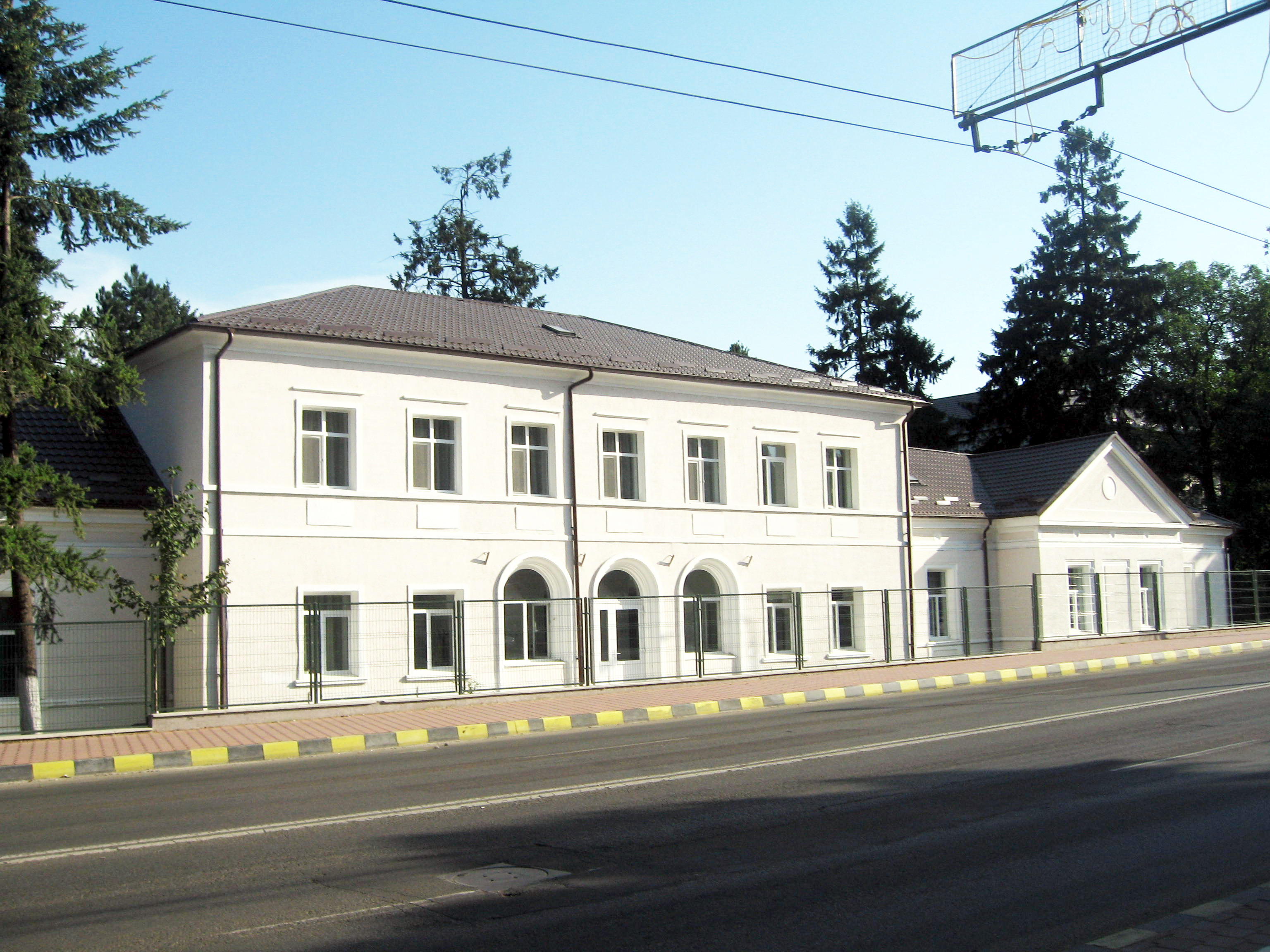
The Old Hospital

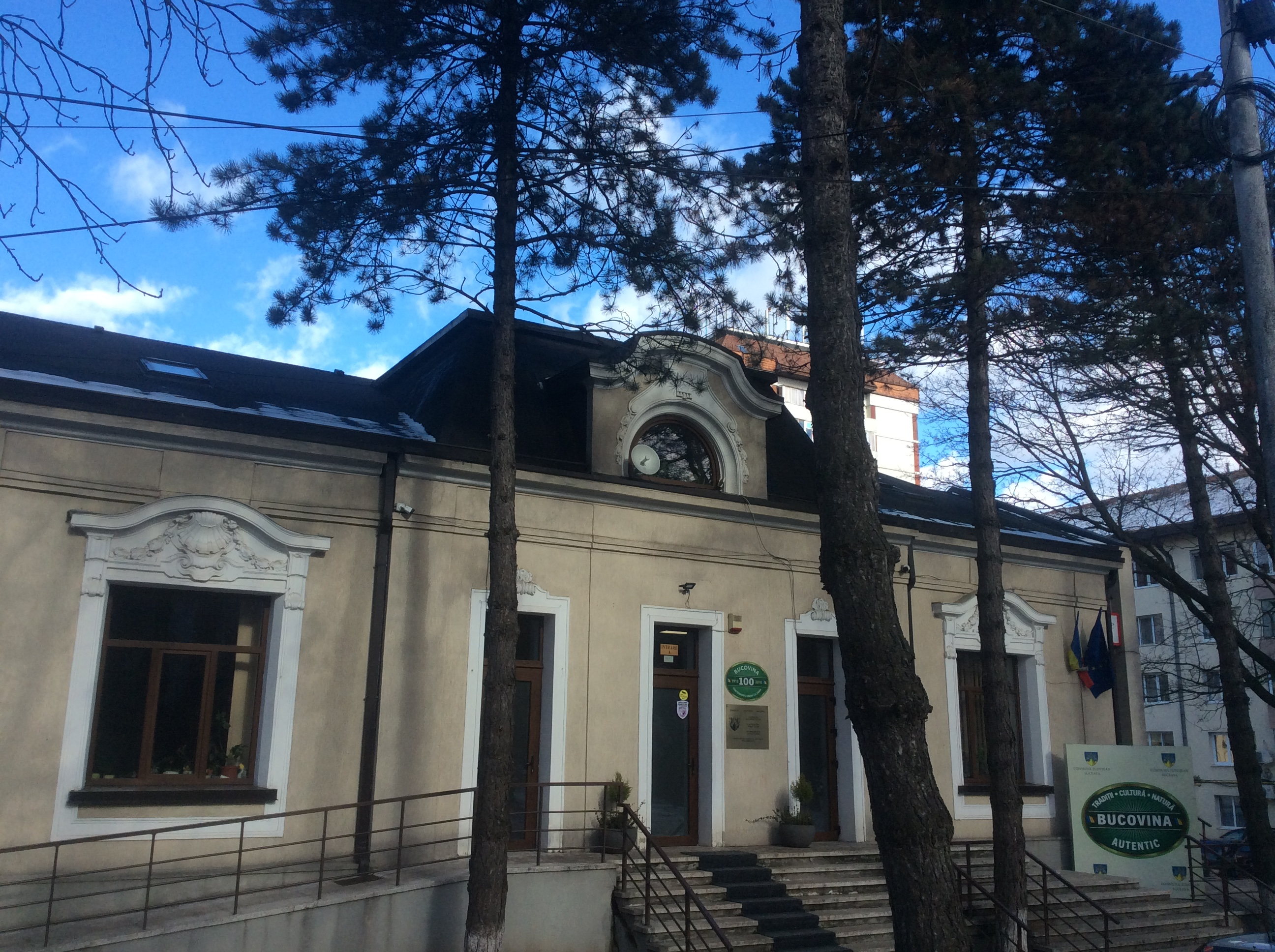
The Friendship House (with bezirk Schwaben)

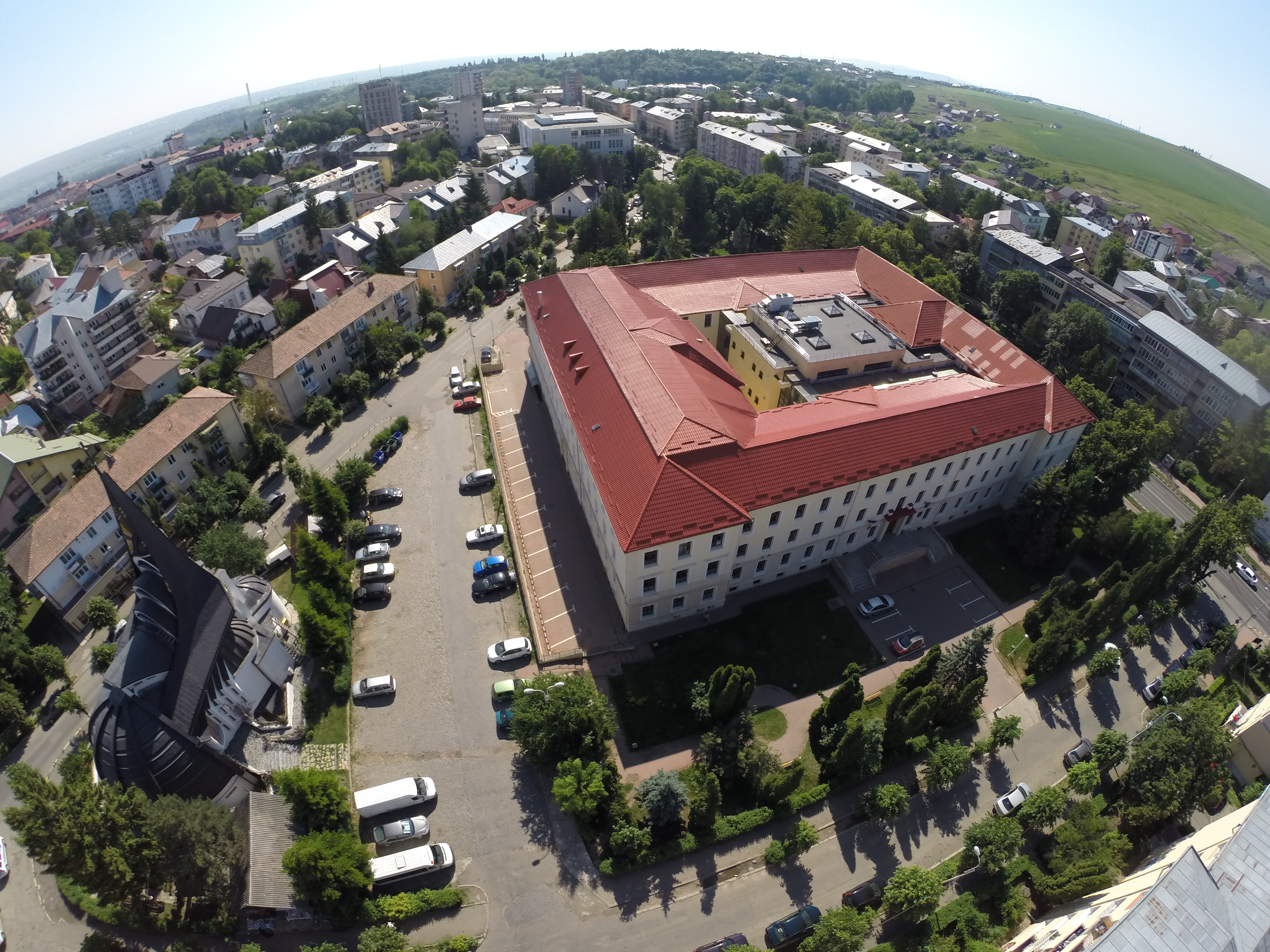
The Justice Palace in the town centre

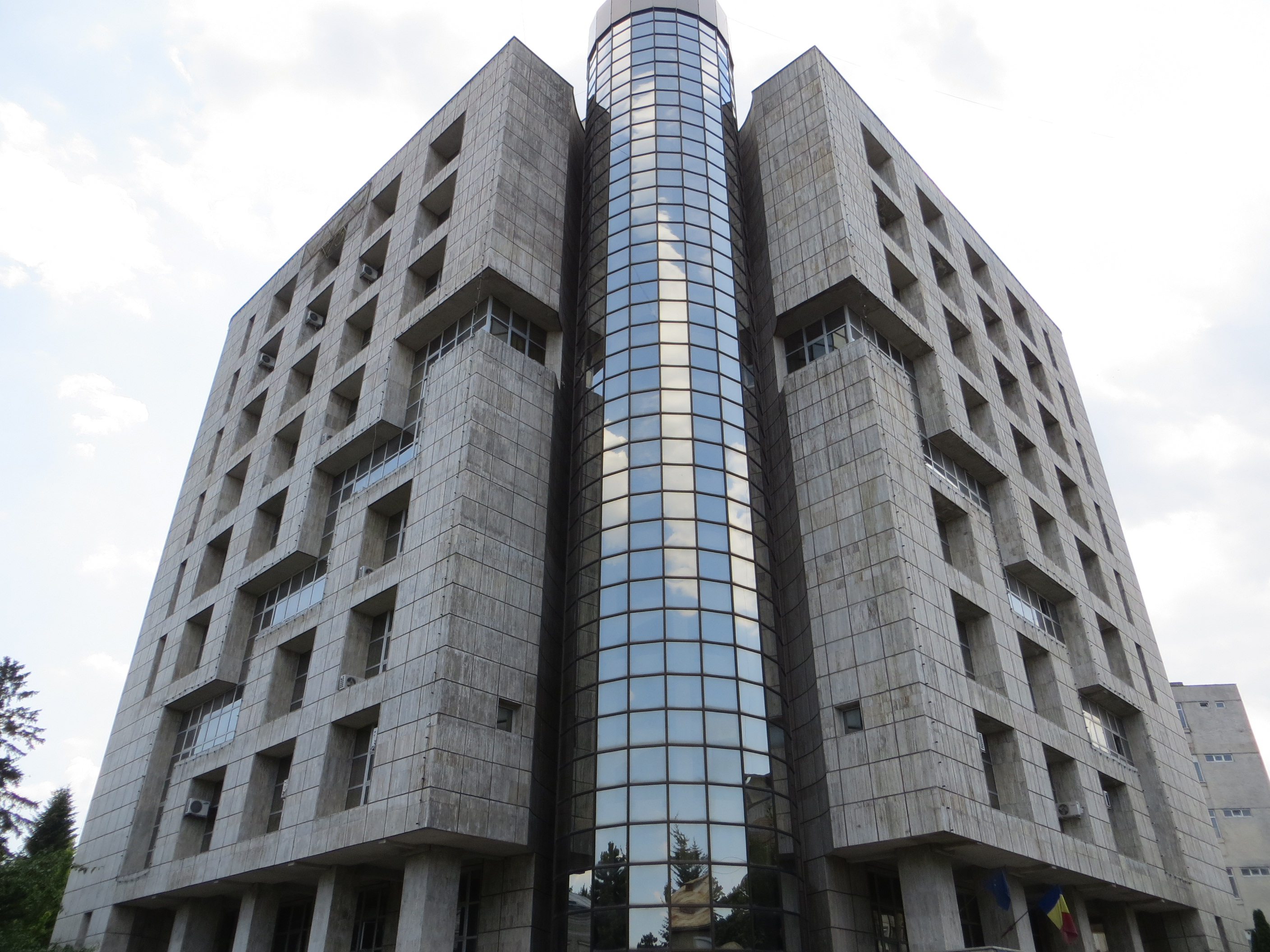
The Palace of Finance

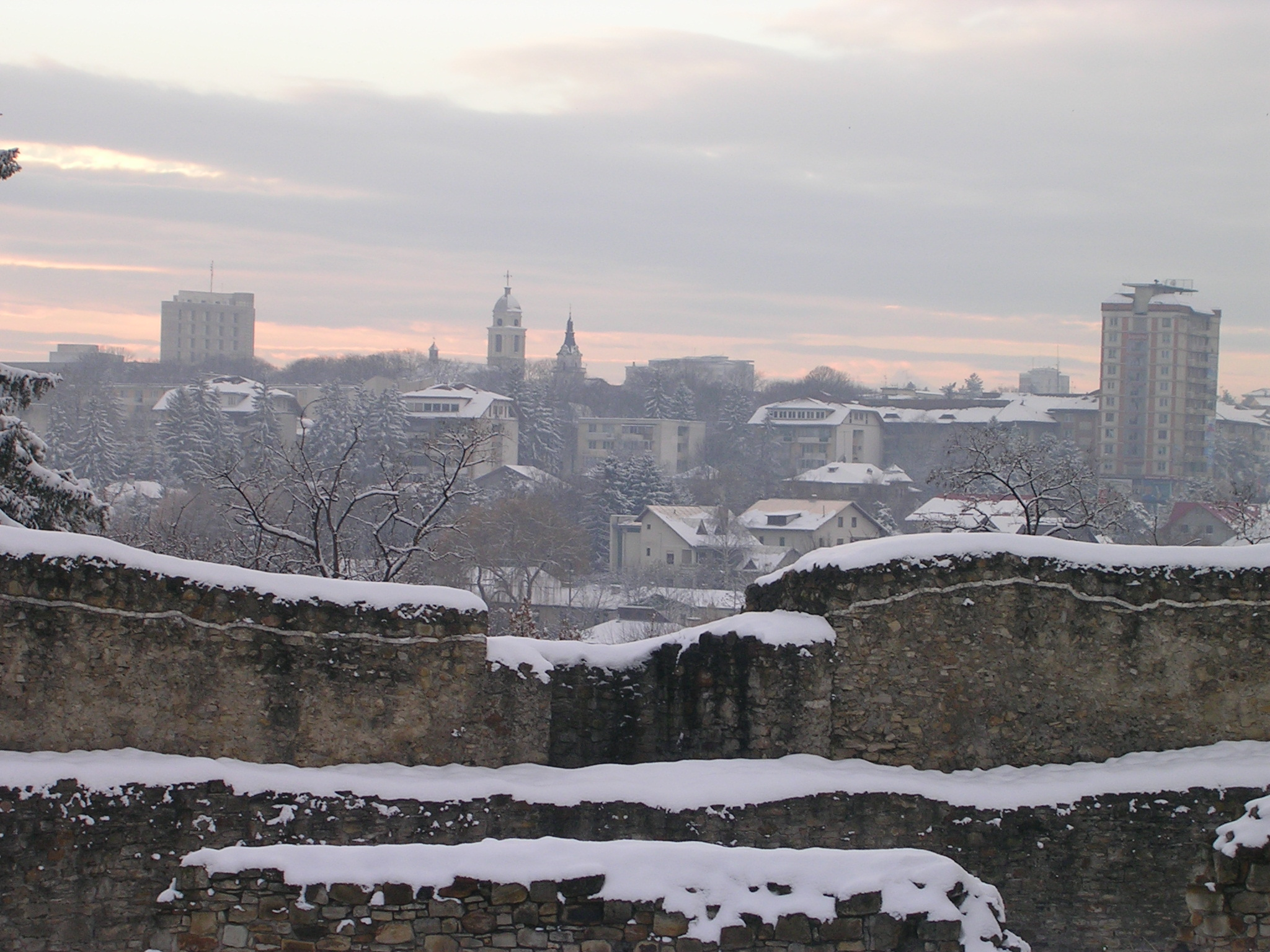
Downtown Suceava, as seen from the medieval Seat Fortress (December 2005)

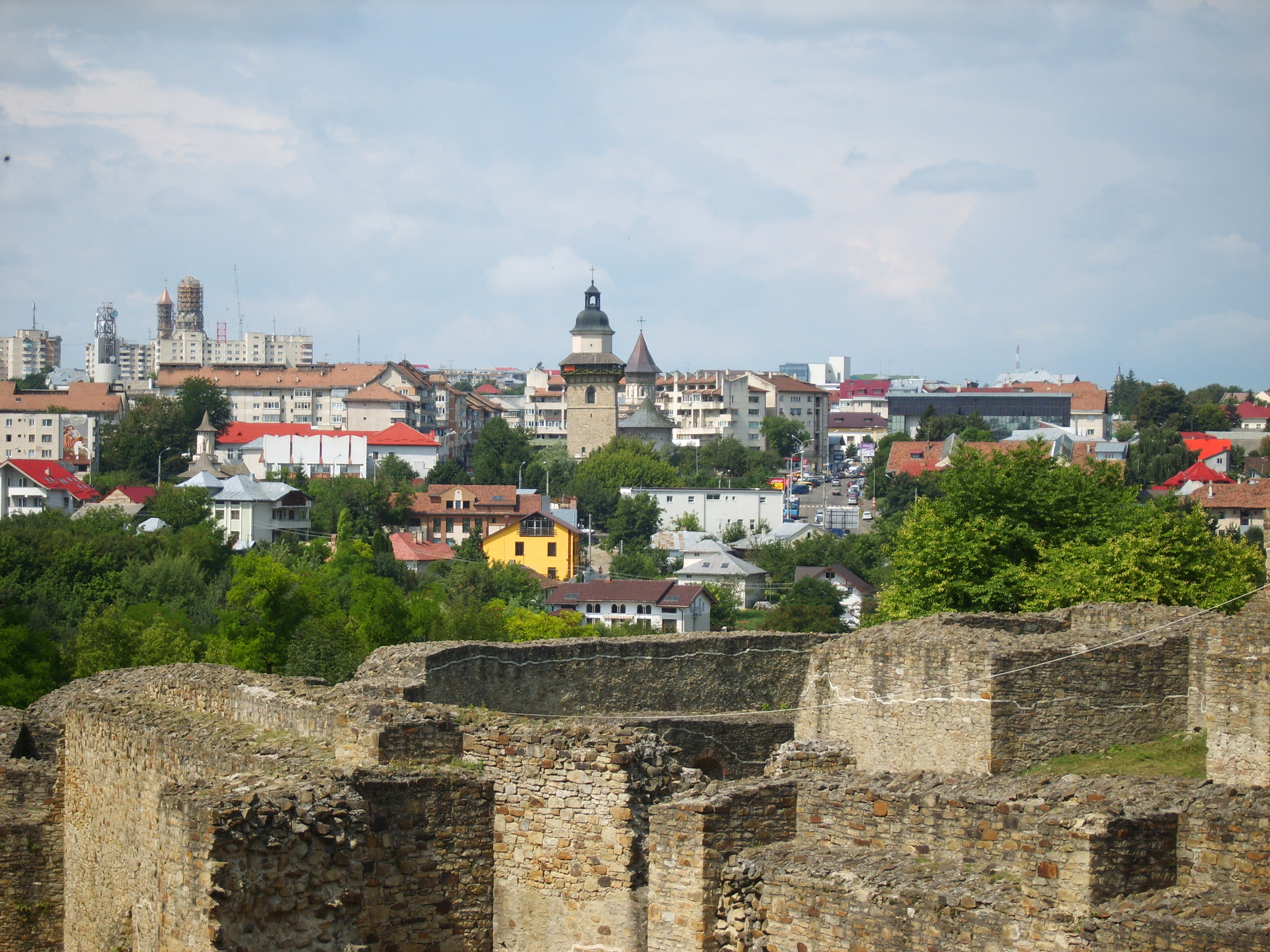
Downtown Suceava, as seen from the medieval Seat Fortress (August 2009)

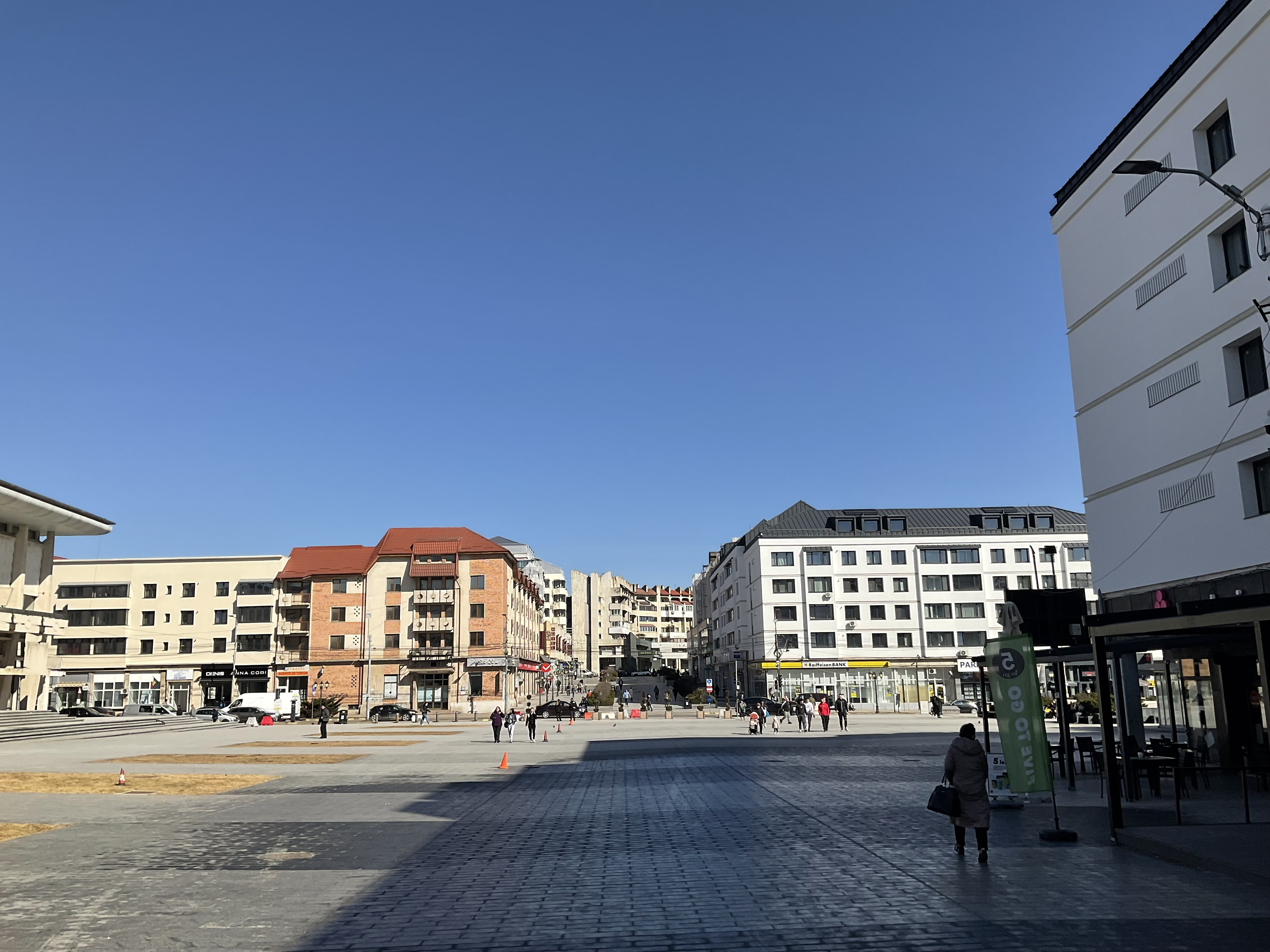
During the 1960s, several historical buildings from the town centre were demolished to build the 22 December square in downtown Suceava. Recently, most of the blocks of flats built during communist times in this area have been renovated.

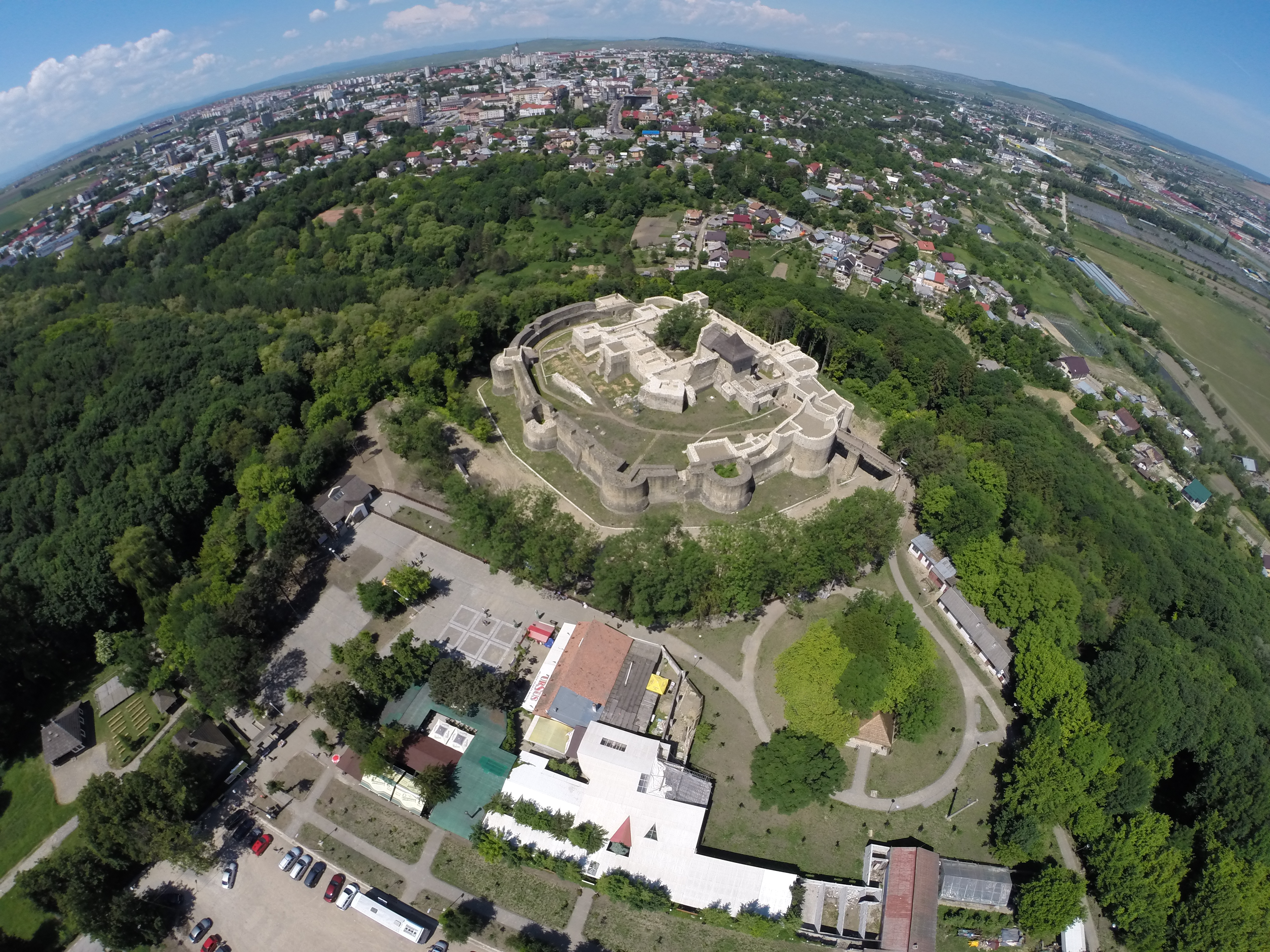
Aerial view of the Seat Fortress (June 2015)

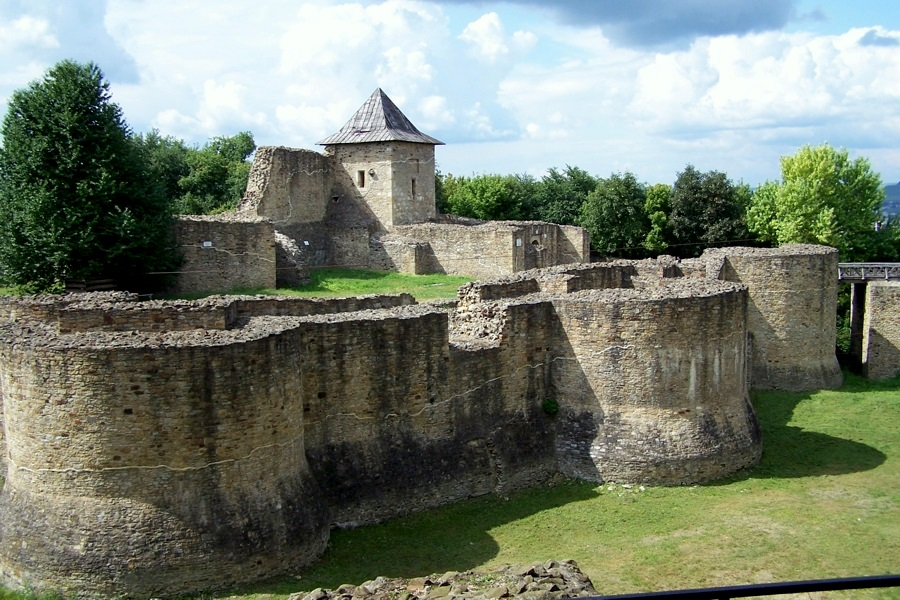
The Seat Fortress (August 2009)

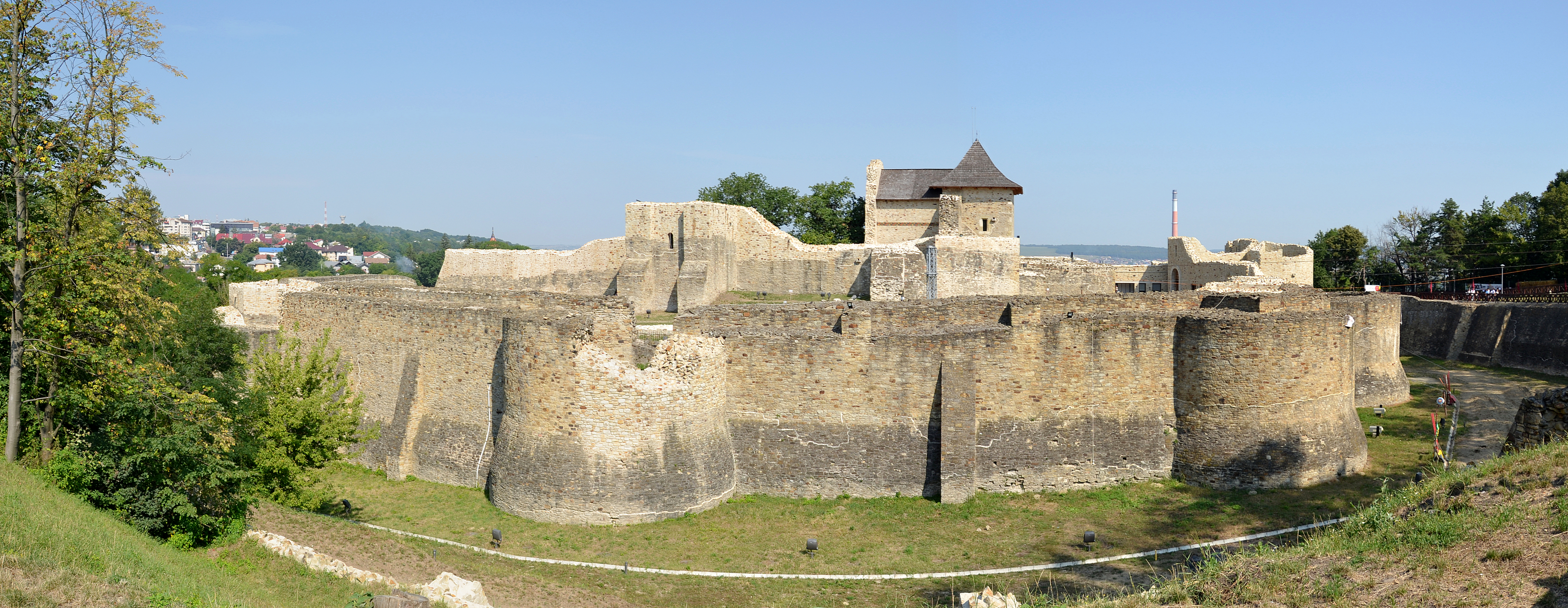
Panoramic view of the Seat Fortress of Suceava as seen in August 2016

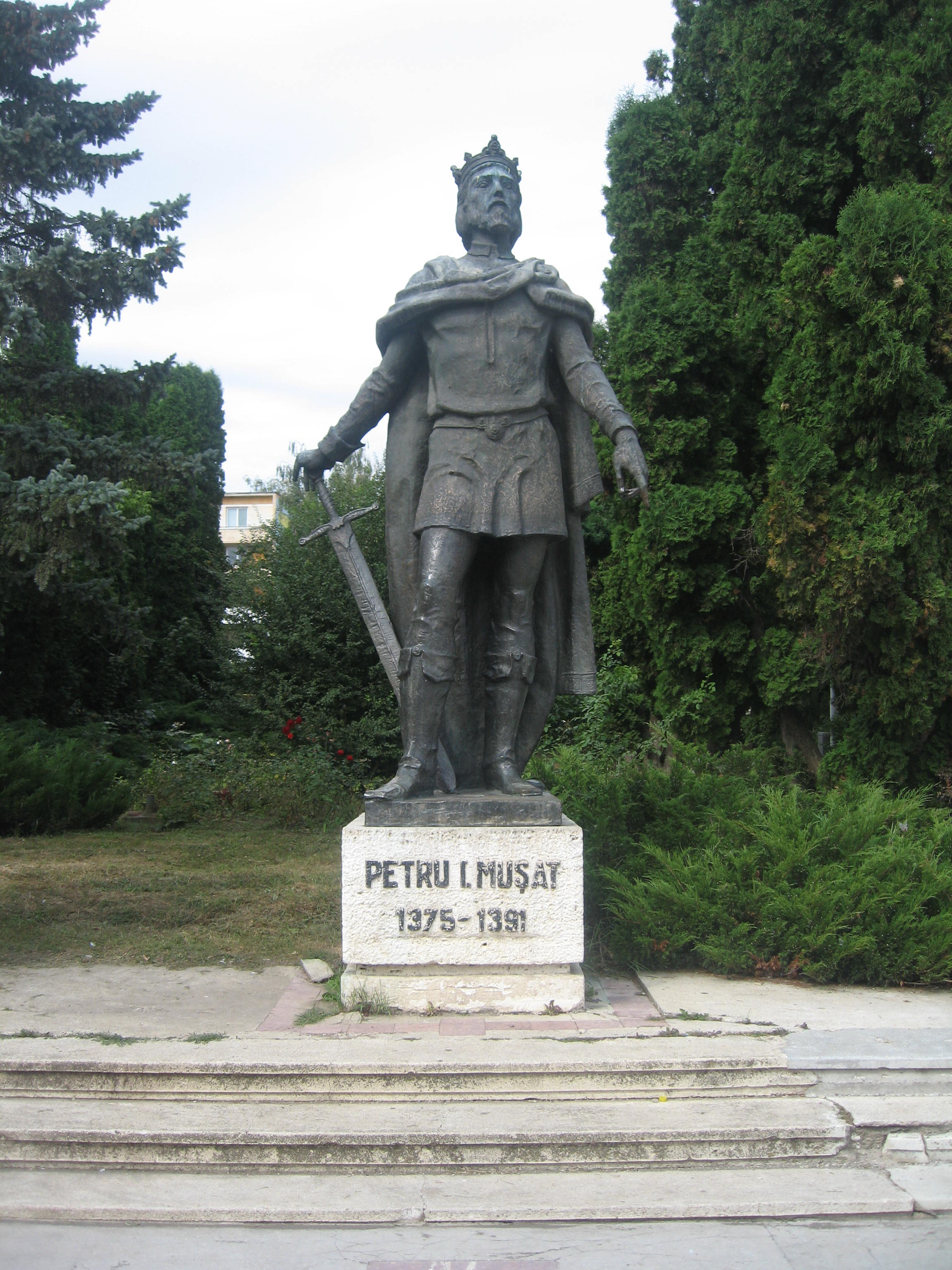
Statue of Petru Mușat, Prince of Moldavia (between 1375 and 1391)

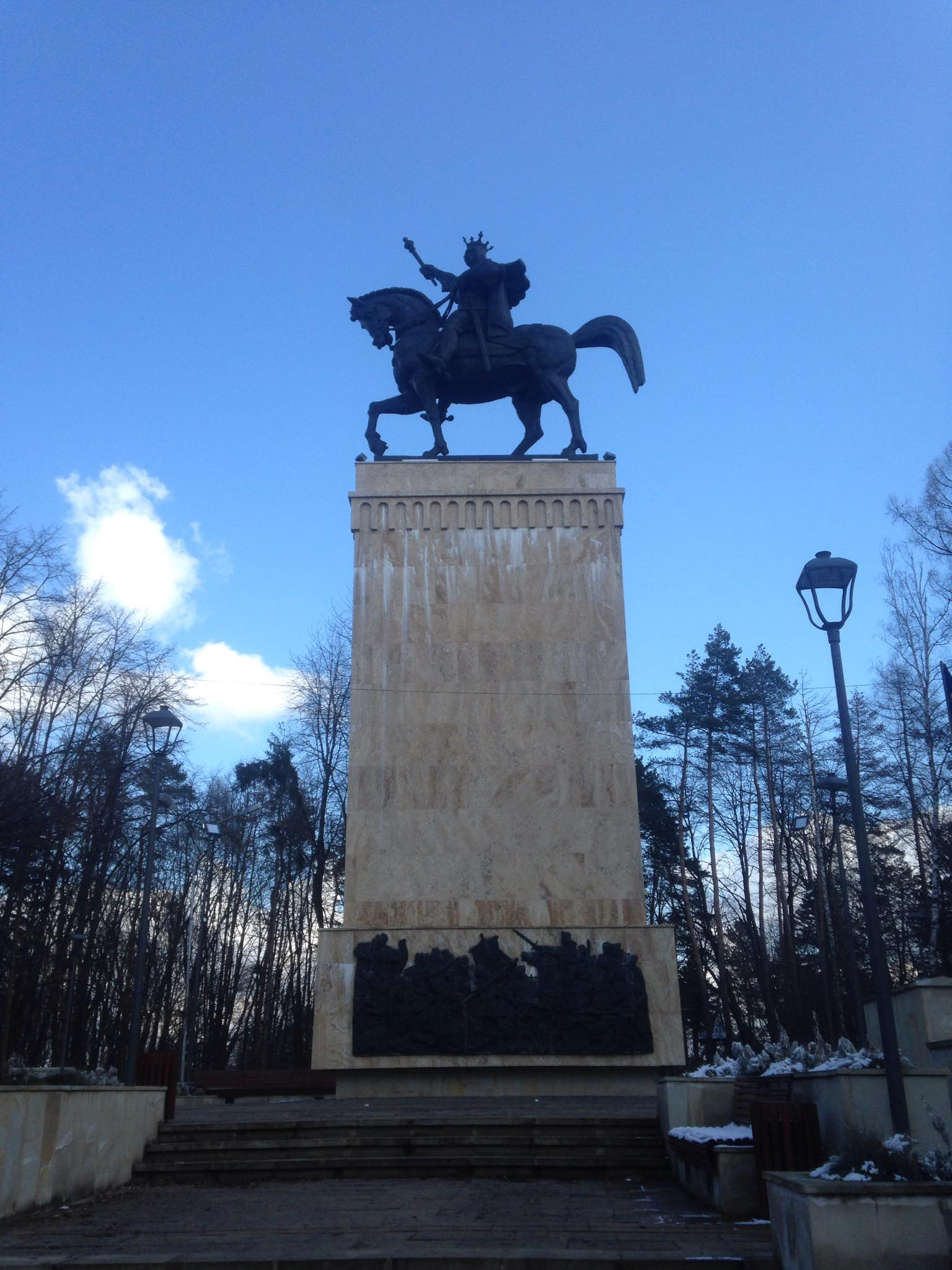
The equestrian statue of Stephen III of Moldavia

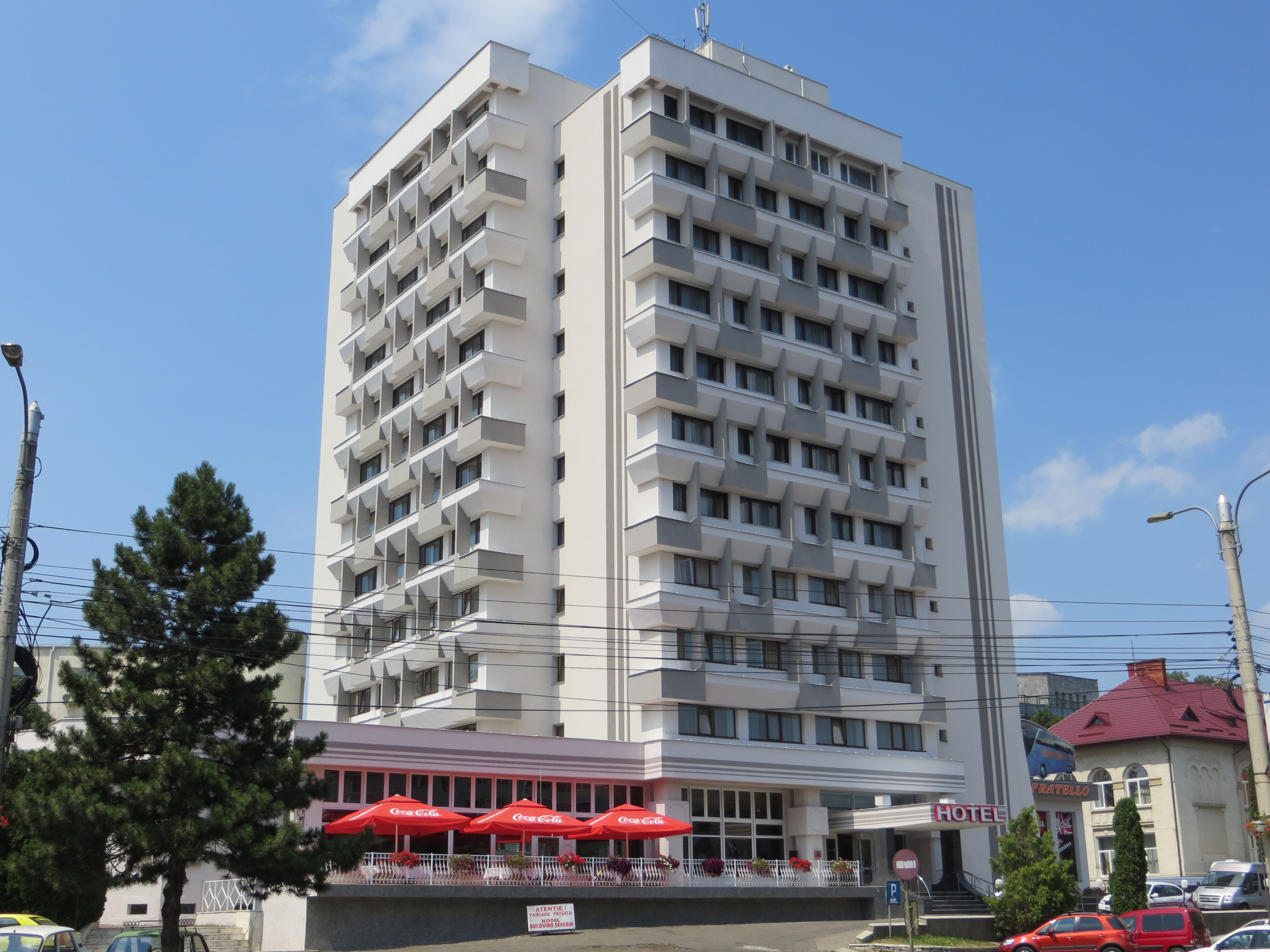
Hotel Bucovina

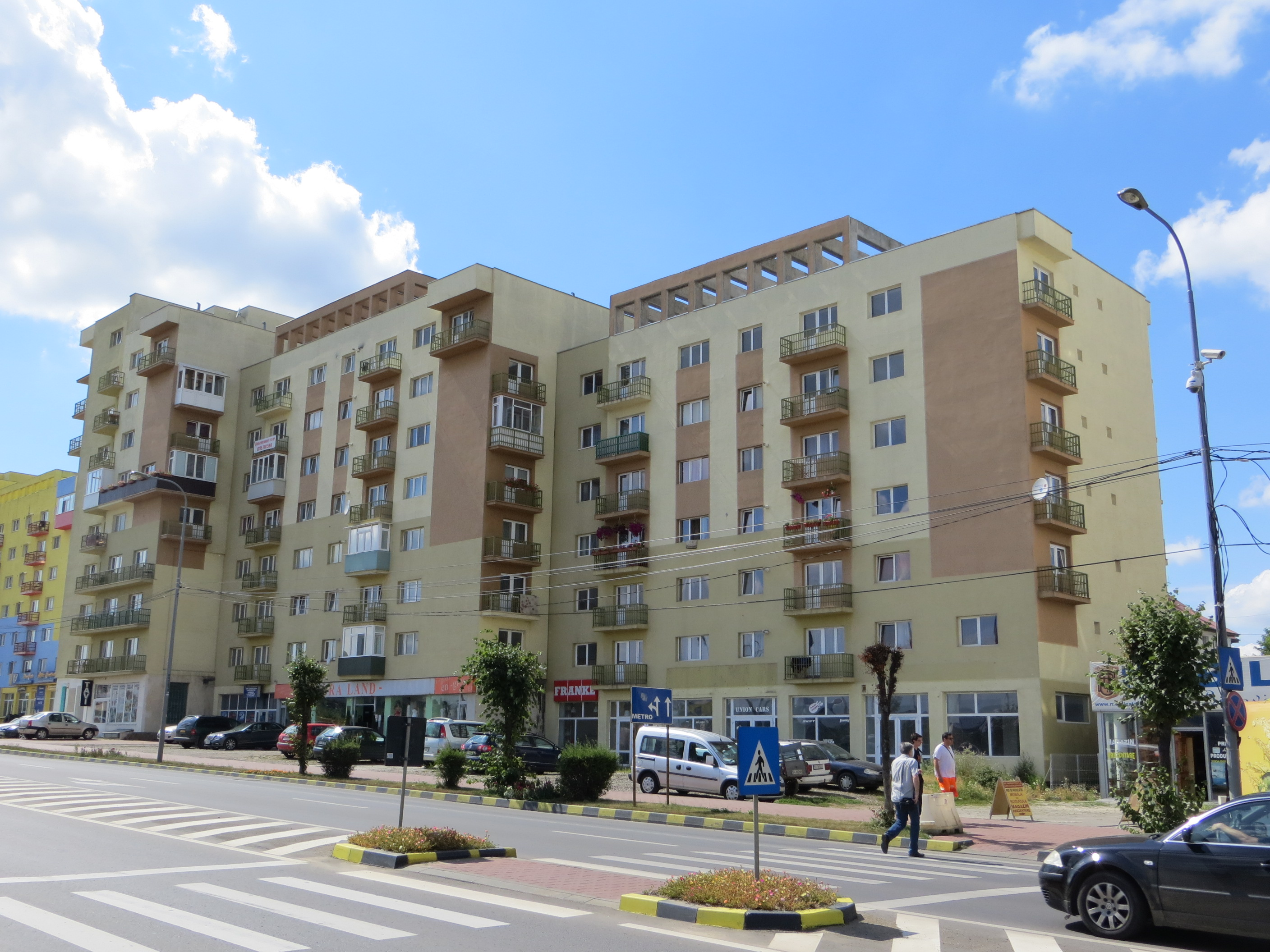
Apartment blocks on the 1 December 1918 boulevard

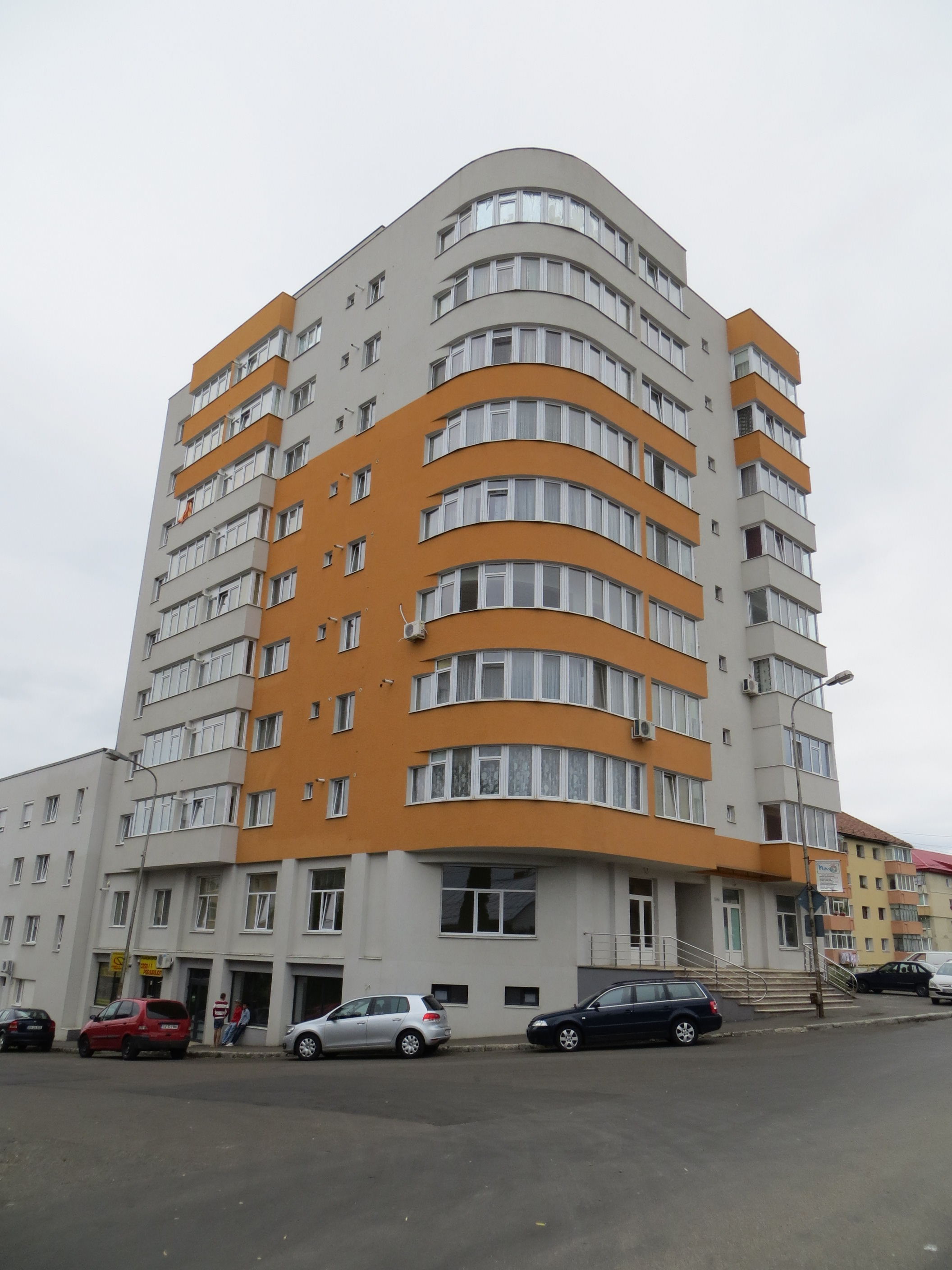
Renovated block of flats on Victory street

High-rise block of flats in downtown Suceava

Armenească Tower, business building

Matei Vișniec Municipal Theater

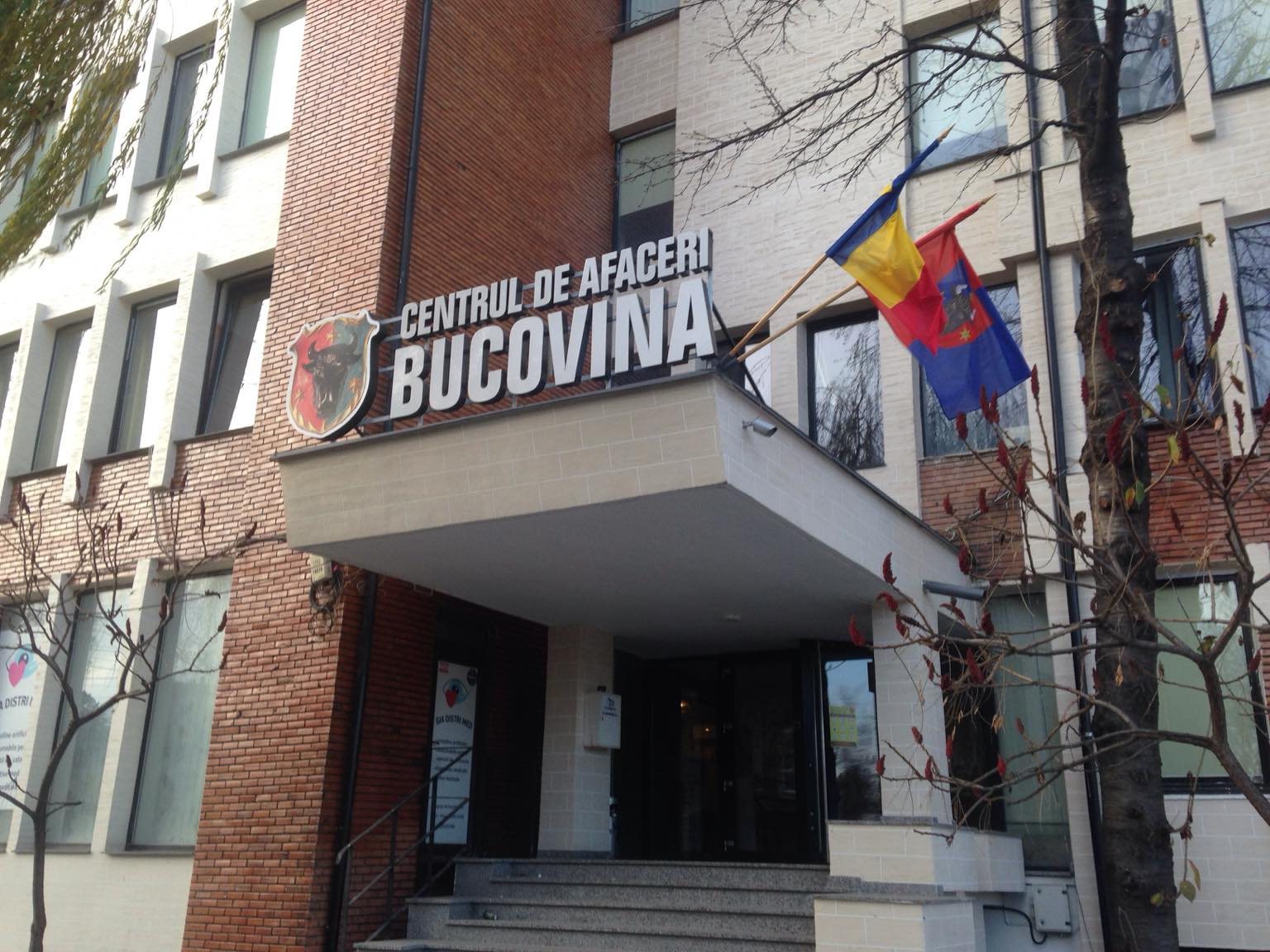
Bukovina Business Centre

IFA Tower, the city's tallest structure (with a total height surpassing 200 metres)

== See also ==
- Founding of Moldavia
- List of monarchs of Moldavia (between the 14th and 19th centuries)
- Churches of Moldavia
- Duchy of Bukovina
- Germans of Romania (including, most notably, Bukovina Germans)
