= Isa Melsheimer =

German artist (born 1968)

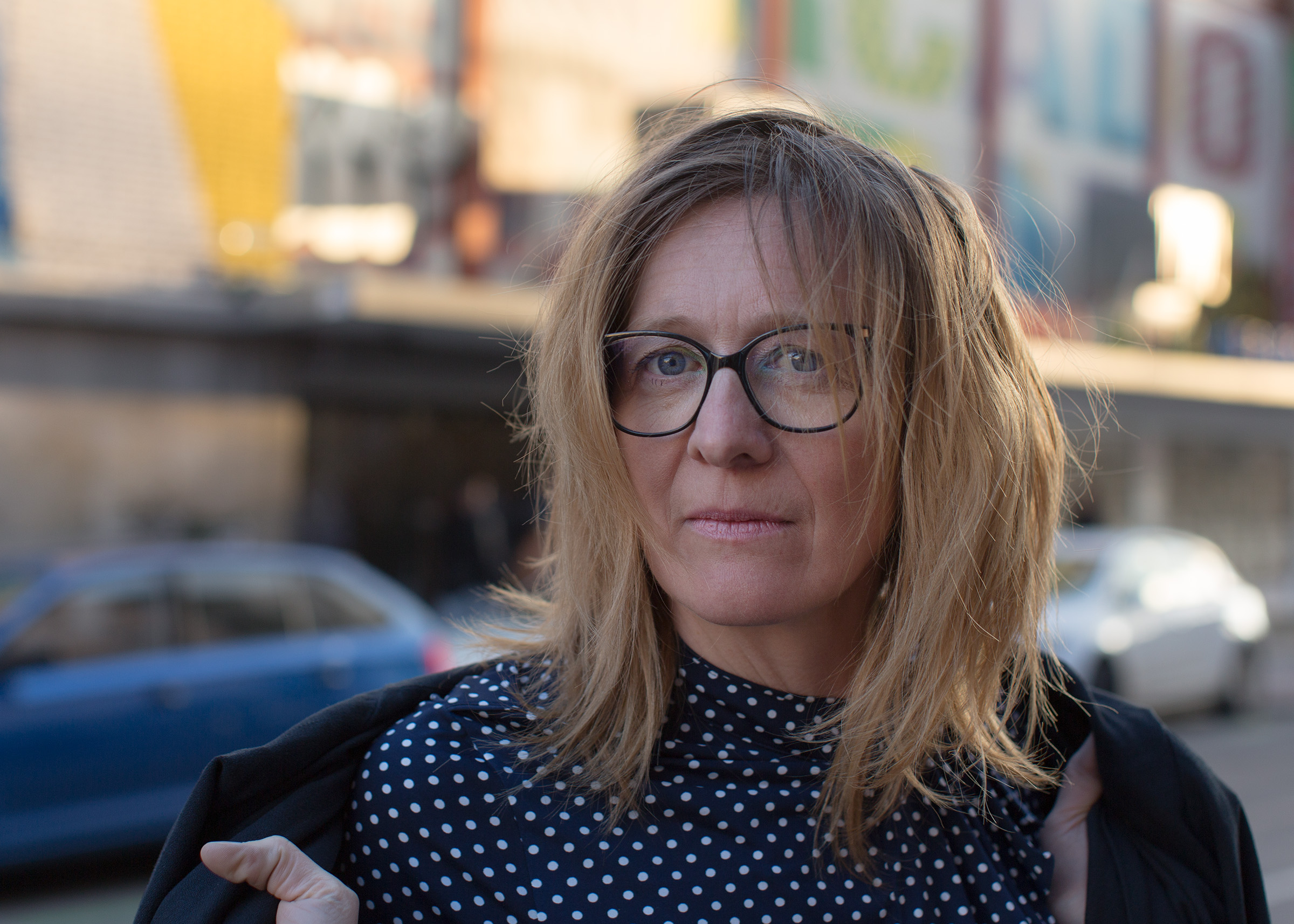
Isa Melsheimer photographed by Oliver Mark, Madrid 2018

Isa Melsheimer (born September 19, 1968, in Neuss) is a German sculptor, object and installation artist, painter and university lecturer.

== Life ==
Isa Melsheimer grew up on a vineyard in Reil on the Moselle. From 1991 to 1997, she studied painting at the Hochschule der Künste Berlin (now Berlin University of the Arts) in the Georg Baselitz master class.

After a substitute semester in Björn Dahlem's class at the Bauhaus University Weimar and a guest professorship for experimental drawing at the Braunschweig University of Art, she has been Professor of Ceramics in the Fine Arts program at the Muthesisus Academy of Fine Arts in Kiel since the winter semester 2022.

Isa Melsheimer lives and works in Berlin.

== Work ==
Isa Melsheimer's artistic work engages with organically evolved and constructed living spaces. Her interest lies in the conditions that emerge in the process of designing and transforming these environments. She focuses both on the history of built structures, from individual architectural forms and urban fabrics to natural formations, and on the influence of human activity on ecological systems.

Melsheimer primarily works with ceramics but also uses materials such as concrete, glass, metal, wood, yarn, fabric, plants, and everyday objects. In addition to her sculptural works, she produces an ongoing series of gouaches.

A central aspect of her work is the creation of fragile, often surreal-looking dwellings and architectural fragments that appear as excerpts of a larger, not fully comprehensible whole. In these, Melsheimer explores how spaces come into being, how they change, and what cultural, social, and ecological meanings they carry.

Her often site-specific installations weave together subjective memories, symbols, and historical events into multi-layered spatial structures. In these, past and present, nature and architecture overlap.

Art historian and curator Verena Gamper describes Isa Melsheimer's engagement with the built environment in her ceramics as a multifaceted process. According to Gamper, the works “oscillate in their appearance between fragment and model, between the made and the grown, between the artificial and the natural-unified beneath glazes that recall efflorescences, oxidized stones, lichens, or layers of earth.”

In their materiality and formal language, the works open up a field of diverse associations, from (utopian) architectural models to animal constructions and organic structures. “In their hybrid appearance, between model-like experimental arrangements of human dwellings and the habitats of other living beings, between the man-made, the animal, and the grown, the ceramics suggest that this architectural process is situated in a world no longer shaped by human intervention.”

== Projects ==
- 2014: THE BEE TREASURE. International Summer festival 2014, Kampnagel Hamburg, artistic direction and choreography: Barbara Schmidt-Rohr; installation/set/costumes: Isa Melsheimer; choreography: Frank Willens and Maria F. Scaroni; dramaturgy: Thomas Schaupp; music/sound: Richard von der Schulenburg
- 2011: EXPEDACTION: Le Corbusier, Pierre Jeanneret, Charlotte Perriand. O32c Workshop, Berlin with Arno Brandlhuber and Christopher Roth
- 2010: gimme shelter. Premiere: 13.05.2010, Live Art Festivals 2010, Kampnagel Hamburg; choreography and performance: Frank Willens and Ulrike Bodammer with their son Elijas; installation: Isa Melsheimer; dramaturgy: Robert Steijn; lightning: Bruno Pocheron; idea and concept: Irmela Kastner and Barbara Schmidt-Rohriii; “Oceanfront Nights” with Arno Brandlhuber Art Basel/Miami Beach; Concrete Society, Lecture on ideological clash, architectural destruction and brutiful objects; Concrete Society with Arno Brandlhuber, Anna-Catharina Gebbers, Bibliothekswohnung; Exhibition project: Blickwechsel. Installation “Unloved Plants” in the Forstgarten/Museum Kurhaus Kleve
- 2009: The life of the shell. Within the project 31PLUS1 of Generali Deutschland Holding AG, Cologne

== Awards and scholarships (selection) ==
- 2017: Fogo Island Arts Residency, Fogo Island, Canada
- 2015: Marianne Werefkin Prize, Berlin Woman Artists 1867 e. V.
- 2013: Residency scholarship, German Academy Rome Villa Massimo
- 2012: Institut für Auslandsbeziehungen e. V., exhibition funding and residency grant, Goethe-Institut Lisbon, Portugal
- 2010: Foundation Kunstfonds Bonn project grant
- 2008: Scholarship of the Berlin Senate for Istanbul and Art Prize of the City of Nordhorn
- 2007: Residency Villa Aurora, Los Angeles
- 2005: Scholarship The Chinati Foundation, Marfa, Texas and Scholarship Civitella Raniere Foundation, Umbertide, Italy
- 2002: Scholarship Stiftung Kulturfonds, Berlin and Glenfiddich Award for Young Art
- 2001: Scholarship Schloss Plüschow, Mecklenburg
- 1999: Scholarship Künstlerhaus Schloss Balmoral, Bad Ems

== Exhibitions (selection) ==
=== Solo ===
- 2025: Modeling the World, Aranya Art Center, Aranya, China
- 2024: All the Metaphors Come True (with Harald Klingelhöller), Galerie Jocelyn Wolff, 798 Art Zone, Peking, China
- 2023: If We Dissovle Now / We Are More Than We Ever Were, Galería Elba Benítez, Madrid
- 2023: The Window, Esther Schipper, Seoul, South Korea
- 2023: Continual Process of Improvement, Galerie nächst St. Stephan Rosemarie Schwarzwälder, Wien, Austria
- 2022: Concrete Bodies are Finite, Centre international d'art et du paysage Île de Vassivière
- 2021: Compost, MAMAC | Musée d'Art Moderne et d'Art Contemporain
- 2020: Der unerfreuliche Zustand der Textur. KINDL – Center for contemporary Art, Berlin
- 2018: Rain, Le 19 Crac, Montbéliard; The Year of the Whale. Fogo Island Arts; Meatboliten. Kunstverein Heppenheim, Heppenheim; Psychotropische Landschaften. Städtische Galerie Delemenhorst, Delmenhorst
- 2017: Der tote Palast zitterte – zitterte! Mies van der Rohe Haus Berlin
- 2015: We live in townscape and, after a trek, we shop in Futurism. Art3, Valence; Kontrastbedürfnis. Ernst-Barlach-Haus, Hamburg; Examinations of the Origins. Quartz Studio, Turin
- 2014: Synapsen. Ikob – Museum for contemporary art, Eupen Belgium
- 2012: Vermilion Sands and Other Stories from the Neon West. Santa Monica Museum of Art, USA
- 2010: Mittelland. Kunsthaus Langenthal, Swiss; Carré d’art, N’és, France
- 2008: Fremdenzimmer. Foundation Arp Museum Bahnhof Rolandseck, Remagen
- 2007: Mönchehaus Museum Goslar
- 2005: The Chinati Foundation, Marfa Texas
- 2004: Corridors. Bonnefantenmuseum, Maastricht
- 2003: Kunstverein Arnsberg
- 1999: Künstlerhaus Mousonturm, Frankfurt am Main

=== Group ===
- 2025: Schöner Wohnen – Architekturvisionen von 1900 bis heute, Kunsthalle Tübingen, Tübingen, Germany
- 2025: Sound of the Earth. Ceramics in Contemporary Art, Kunstmuseum / Kunsthalle Appenzell, Switzerland
- 2025: IN/SU/LA, Matèria, Rome
- 2025: Radio Luxembourg: Echoes across borders. New Collection Display, Mudam Luxemburg, Luxemburg
- 2025: States of Uncertain Domesticities, Haus Kunst Mitte, Berlin & House of Arts, Brno, Czech Republic
- 2025: GLÄSERN, Schloss Biesdorf, Berlin, Germany
- 2025: Life is what happens to you when you are busy making other plans: The aesthetics of contingency, Galerie Jocelyn Wolff, Paris, France
- 2025: Only Lovers Left Alive, Behncke Gallery, Klenze Palais am Odeonsplatz München, Germany
- 2024: Rewriting Territories, Palm Gallery, Taipei, Taiwan
- 2024: Modell und Wirklichkeit, Die Möglichkeit einer Insel, Berlin, Germany
- 2024: Regenerative Futures, Fondation Thalie, Brüssel, Belgium
- 2024: Group Show, Galerie Esther Schipper, Domaine du Muy, France
- 2024: Maison Bernard, Genius Loci, Théoule-sur-Mer, Cannes, France
- 2024: stay moving, Galerie Nächst St. Stephan Rosemarie Schwarzwälder, Wien, Austria
- 2024: Volume Invisible, Galerie Jocelyn Wolff, Paris, France
- 2023: Per-Form, BROWNIE Project Gallery, Shanghai
- 2023: Fragment of an infinite discourse. Lenbachhaus, Munich; Pride and Prejudice. University Gallery of the Angewandte in Heiligenkreuzerhof Vienna; High Spirits. Monopol Berlin, Berlin
- 2022: It is the scenery that moves. Brotéria, Lisbon; Delivery Hero. O P E N Berlin, Isa Melsheimer & Oliver Mark; Rohkunstbau XXVII Altdöbern Castle; Venican stars. Art Museum Chur, Switzerland; Blanc de Blancs. Villa Schöningen, Potsdam
- 2021: I never wanted to be a constructivist! Kunstverein Pforzheimvi; 6 of 60 | Black + White. Käthe-Kollwitz-Museum, Berlin; FRagile. Municipal Museums Heilbronn / Kunsthalle Vogelmann, Heilbronn; Rituals of the present. Künstlerhaus Sootbörn, Hamburg; Anything Goes? Berlin Architectures of the 1980s, Berlinische Galerie, Berlin
- 2020: Glass and concrete. Manifestations of the impossible. MARTa Herford; On everyone’s lips. Wolfsburg Art Museum; My father, my neighbors, my friends and their friends. Haubrok foundation FAHRBEREITSCHAFT, Berlin; Everything in Wonderland. Nassauischer Kunstverein Wiesbaden
- 2019: Made in Marl. Sculpture Museum Glaskasten Marl
- 2018: Room XVII. Werkhalle wiesenburg, Berlin; Frozen to Pieces. Gussglashalle, Berlin; Art Biesenthal. Biesenthal; Belonging to a Place. Gallery at the Embassy of Canada, Washington, USA; Women House. National Museum of Women in the Arts, Washington, USA
- 2017: Stories of Nature. Museum of Modern Art Ludwig Foundation (mumok), Vienna; Urban Lights Ruhr. Urban Space Marl and Sculpture Museum Glaskasten Marl; Between Spaces. Center for Art and Public Space, Biesdorf Palace, Berlin
- 2016: Ready for the stage/1st act. Arp Museum Bahnhof Rolandseck Foundation, Rolandseck; Concrete. Kunsthalle Wien, Vienna; Microscopie du banc. Mirco Onde, Center d’art de L’Onde, Wélizy-Villacoublay; France
- 2015: the difficult space. kunsthaus muerz, Mürzzuschlag, Austria; Parc de Sculptures Contemoraines. Domaine Du Muy, Le Muy, France; Harmony and upheaval reflections of chines landscapes. Marta Herford; variations LE CORBUSIER. Chateâu de Carros, Carros France; Tapisserie? De Picasso à Messager. Musée des Beaux-Arts; Angers France; (im)possible! Artist as architects. Mara Herford; Hunters & collectors in contemporary art. Villa Merkel, Esslingen
- 2014: Hunters & collectors in art. Morsbroich Museum, Leverkusen; What models can do. Museum for Contemporary Art, Siegen; Rapunzel & Co. Of towers and people in art. Arp Museum Bahnhof Rolandseck Foundation; Contradictory Contours / Spaces and Interspaces. Märkisches Museum Witten; Fata morgana. Ikob – Museum of Contemporary Art, Eupen Belgium
- 2013: Power. Delusion. Vision. The tower and urban giants in sculpture. Municipal Museum, Heilbronn; Schauplatz Stadt. Mülheim an der Ruhr; HANDARBEIT Material and symbolism. Museum Kunst der Westküste, Alkersum/Föhr
- 2012: Garden of Eden. Palais de Tokyo, Paris; 30 artists / 30 rooms. Neues Museum Nürnberg
- 2011: Mondes inventés, Mondes habités. Musée d’Art Moderne Grand-Duc Jean (Mudam), Luxembourg; Interior Worlds. Museum Kunst der Westküste, Alkersum/Föhr; Pamphile Show #3. Falckenberg Collection Hamburg; Capitain Pamphile. Deichtorhallen, Hamburg
- 2010: 15 years Villa Aurora – Transatlantic Impulses. Academy of Arts, Berlin; (re)designing nature. Künstlerhaus, Vienna; Solde migratoire. Biennale de Belleville, Paris; FischGrätenMelkStand. Temporary Kunsthalle Berlin
- 2009: Cologne Sculpture 5. Sculpture Park Cologne; New light at the lake. Maschsee, Hannover; Le Travail de Rivière. Center d’art contemporian d’Ivry-le Crédac, Ivry-sur- Seine
- 2008: On Produceability. Alti Aylik, Istanbul, Turkey; Lizabaeth Oliveria L.A., Los Angeles
- 2007: M for M. Time Festival, S.M.A.K., Ghent, Belgium; Stedelijk Museum voor Actuele Kunst, Ghent
- 2006: Objects. Badischer Kunstverein, Karlsruhe, Germany; Asterism, Artists Living in Berlin. Museo Tamayo Arte Contemporáneo, Mexico City
- 2005: Light art from artificial light. ZKM Center for Art and Media, Karlsruhe
- 2004: The built, the unbuilt, and the unbuildable. Overgaden, Copenhagen
- 2003: un-built cities. Bonn Art Association; Small talk- Performative Installation #2. Lily van der Stokker, museum Ludwig, Cologne
- 2001: new Heimat. Frankfurter Kunstverein, Frankfurt am Main

== Collections (selection) ==
Works by Isa Melsheimer are held in the following public collections:

- Arp Museum Bahnhof Rolandseck, Rolandseck
- Bonnefantenmusuem, Maastricht
- Berlinische galerie, Museum of Modern Art, berlin
- Carré d’art – Musée d’art contemporain de Nîmes, France CNAP
- Center national des arts plastiques, France
- Collezione la Gaia, Busca, Italy
- European Patent Office, Munich
- Fundación Helga de Alvear, Cáceres, Spain
- Institut d’art contemporian de Villeurbanne, France
- Künstlerhaus Schloß Balmoral, Rhineland-Palatinate Foundation, Bad Ems
- Mudam, Luxembourg
- Museum Ludwig, Cologne
- Parc de Sculptures Contemporaines, Domaine Du Muy, Le Muy, France
- Deutsche Bank Collection, Frankfurt
- Falckenberg Collection, Hamburg
- Philara Collections, Düsseldorf
- Collection of Contemporary Art of the Federal Republic of Germany
- S.M.A.K. Stedelijk Musum voor Actuele Kunst, Ghent, Belgium

== Publications (selection) ==
- Annett Reckert (Hrsg.): Isa Melsheimer – Psychotropische Landschaften. Städtische Galerie Delmenhorst, Delmenhorst 2018, ISBN 978-3-944683-24-9.
- Mies van der Rohe haus (Hrsg.): Isa Melsheimer – der tote Palast zitterte – zitterte! form + zweck, Berlin 2017, ISBN 978-3-947045-05-1.
- Karsten Müller (Hrsg.): Isa Melsheimer – Kontrastbedürfnis. Verlag für Moderne Kunst, Wien 2015, ISBN 978-3-903004-50-4.
- Kunsthaus Langenthal (Hrsg.): Isa Melsheimer, Mittelland. Langenthal 2010, ISBN 978-3-905817-26-3.
- Städtische Galerie Nordhorn (Hrsg.): Isa Melsheimer – Kunstpreis der Stadt Nordhorn 2008. Städtische Galerie, Nordhorn 2009, ISBN 978-3-922303-65-7.
- Klaus Gallwitz (Hrsg.): Isa Melsheimer – Fremdenzimmer. Arp-Museum Bahnhof Rolandseck, 2008, ISBN 978-3-937572-92-5.
