= Marc Brandenburg =

German artist

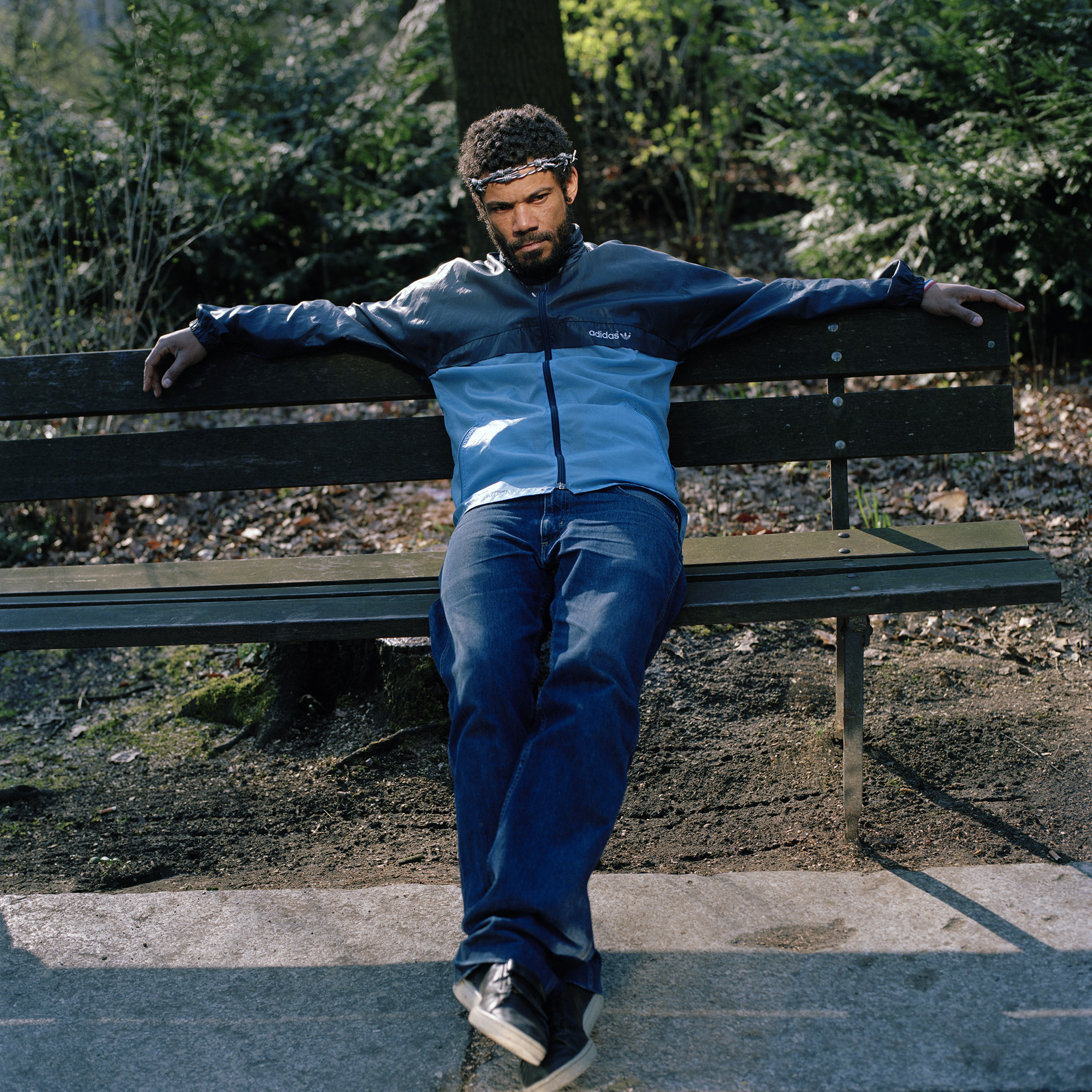
Marc Brandenburg photographed by Oliver Mark, Berlin 2007

Marc Brandenburg (born July 18, 1965) is a German artist.

== Life ==
Marc Brandenburg was born in Berlin in 1965, the son of a German mother and an Afro-American GI who worked for the US military. In 1968 he moved with his family to the US, and returned in 1977 to West Berlin, where he soon came into contact with the punk scene. From 1983 until 1988 he worked as a doorman in the Berlin nightclub Dschungel, which he had been frequenting since the late 1970s. Named by his mother after Marc Bohan, the chief designer of Dior, he began to work, self-taught, as a fashion designer in 1984, and frequently collaborated with other designers such as Claudia Skoda, PLEZ and Tabea Blumenschein. In 1988 he appeared in East Berlin with the performance art and music group Die Tödliche Doris.

Fashion was to remain an element of his artistic work. Thus, in his first institutional solo exhibition Oceans of Violence (with Sabina Maria van der Linden) at Künstlerhaus Bethanien in Berlin (1993), he showed his work Camouflage Pullover for Foreigners and a Burberry camouflage cap, a reaction to the 1992 violent xenophobic riots in Rostock-Lichtenhagen. In 2009 he collaborated with designer Bernhard Wilhelm for a collection, in 2010 he designed undershirts for Schiesser, and in 2016 he worked with Bless on the Daycation collection.

Marc Brandenburg lives in Berlin and Barcelona.

== Work ==
In 1992 Brandenburg began documenting his surroundings in photographs and translated these photos into freehand pencil drawings. Very early in his exhibitions, he sampled elements from porn and fashion magazines, advertisements and packaging of plastic toys and combined them with drawings of personal imagery. 1994 saw the publication of his Picture book, with drawings portraying a fictitious day in his Berlin circle of friends. In 1996 he started to use copy machines and computer to invert and distort his photos and to use the prints as templates for his drawings. Since the mid-1990s, he has produced multiple series of drawings, which he often lines up at eye level to form film-like sequences, achieving effects such as zoom, panning shots or blurring in the individual drawings.

In this period, he made numerous staged and performative self-portraits using disguises, again making photographs, then pencil copies, concentrating on role-play and body images, costumes and rituals outside social norms. His motifs included right-wing extremists, hooligans, costumed anti-globalisation activists, participants in raves and parades, homeless people and eccentrics, his core themes being "overload, excess, addiction, overkill.“

Since the beginning of his career Brandenburg's work has frequently been associated with 1960s and 1980s pop culture and Andy Warhol's artistic praxis, or – due to Brandenburg's homosexuality and his mixed-race origin – interpreted in a queer, anti-racist context. He himself, however, emphasised that he felt the formal and conceptual aspects of drawing and the fundamental exploration of representation to be more important than the motifs themselves: "The main thing is this void behind the images, the white showing through."

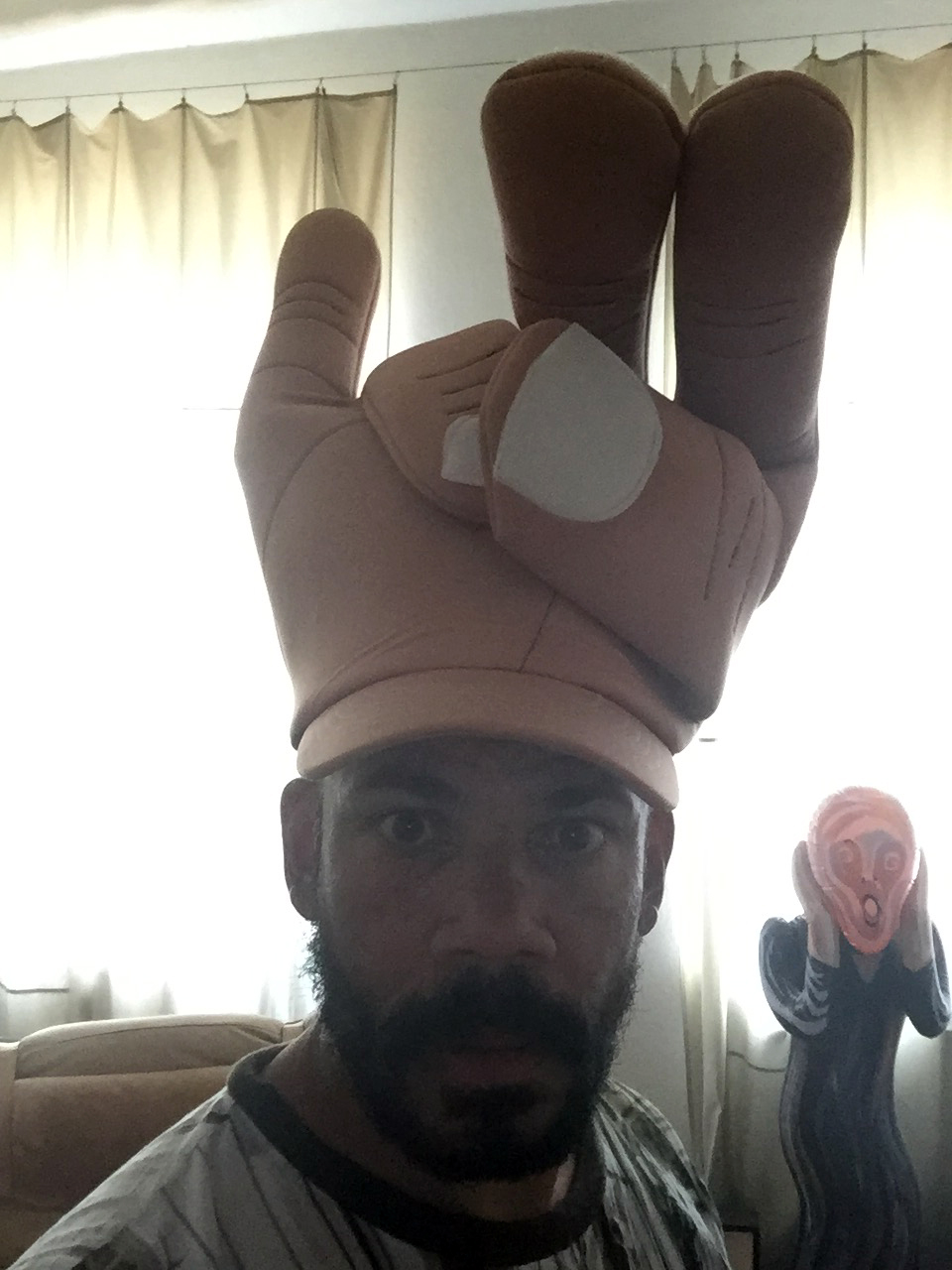
Marc Brandenburg (2018)

After his 2005 solo exhibition in the Museum für Moderne Kunst in Frankfurt am Main, to mark the award of the Karl Ströher Prize, Brandenburg often installed his drawings under black light in darkened rooms, giving the effect of a negative. He described this as the "counterpart to the White Cube". At the end of the 2000s, he began working with different forms of reproductions, transferring his original drawings into copies, screen prints, stickers or temporary tattoos. In 2009 he produced a permanent screen-print installation for the Berlin club Berghain, where he also designed a kiosk for a group exhibition in 2014, selling tattoos with motifs from Berghain's architecture and found objects such as used condoms, buttplugs and the bouncer's head. In exhibitions such as Normex in the Städtische Galerie Wolfsburg (2012), he designed entire rooms with sticker foils running along the walls or arranged as transparent clusters on window-panes so that the daylight projected the drawings into the room.

== Awards and prizes ==
- 2002 Working scholarship from the Stiftung Kunstfonds Bonn
- 2005 Karl Ströher Prize from the City of Frankfurt, Senate scholarship from the City of Berlin, Artist in Residence, Villa Romana, Florence
- 2016 Artist in Residence / Goethe Institute, Wellington, New Zealand

== Permanent installations ==
- 2008 UV/R, Grill Royal, Berlin
- 2009 Untitled, Berghain/Panorama Bar, Berlin

== Public collections ==
- Kupferstichkabinett Berlin
- Kupferstichkabinett Dresden
- Museum of Modern Art, New York
- Hamburger Kunsthalle
- Museum für Moderne Kunst, Frankfurt
- Museum der Moderne Salzburg
- The Studio Museum, New York
- Institut für Auslandsbeziehungen, Stuttgart
- Bundeskunstsammlung
- Bayerische Staatsoper
- Städtische Galerie Wolfsburg

== Selected exhibitions ==
- 1990 Adieu, Scheederbauer, Berlin
- 1992 Punk and Circumstance along the Yellow Brick Road – Liebeskummer, Galerie Martin Schmitz, Kassel
- 1993 Marc Brandenburg & Attila Richard Lucas I, PLUG IN, Winnipeg, CA; Marc Brandenburg & Attila Richard Lucas II, Gallery III, School of Art, University of Manitoba, Winnipeg, CA
- 1996 The Dangling Conversation – from Electric Lane to Lavender Hill, Morris Healy Gallery, New York City
- 1998 Draw Stranger, PLUG IN, Winnipeg, CA
- 2000 White Rainbow, Contemporary Fine Arts, Berlin; Paul Morris Gallery, New York; Neuer Berliner Kunstverein, Berlin; Kunstmuseum Wolfsburg
- 2002 Kunstraum Bonn, Bonn
- 2003 Full Circle (Excerpts from Negrophobia), Kunstraum Innsbruck, Innsbruck
- 2004 Laura Mars Group, Berlin; Kunstverein Frankfurt; Schwules Museum, Berlin; David Zwirner, New York
- 2006 Tilt, André Schlechtriem Temporary, New York
- 2010 Bonkers, Contemporary Fine Arts, Berlin; Deutsch-Amerikanische Freundschaft, Denver Art Museum, Denver; Isolated Imagery, Galerie Thaddaeus Ropac, Salzburg
- 2011 Version, OFF/SITE, New York; Marc Brandenburg. Zeichnung, Hamburg Kunsthalle, Hamburg
- 2012 NORMEX, Städtische Galerie, Wolfsburg
- 2013 Interior/Exterior, Galerie Thaddaeus Ropac, Paris
- 2015 Marc Brandenburg. Zeichnung I Skulptur I Performance, Stade museums, Stade
- 2017 Alpha St, Galerie Thaddaeus Ropac, Salzburg
- 2018 Camoufflage Pullover, Kunstraum Potsdam, Potsdam
- 2019 Unlimited Art Basel, Basel, CH
- 2020 Snowflake, Galerie Thaddaeus Ropac, Paris, France; Snowflake, Galerie Thaddaeus Ropac, London, UK
- 2021 Hirnsturm II, Palais Populaire, Berlin, Germany; Hirnsturm II, Städel Museum, Frankfurt am Main, Germany

== Selected group exhibitions ==
- 1995 Summer Exhibition 1995, Paul Morris Gallery, New York 1995
- 1998 Draw, Stranger, PLUG IN, Winnipeg 1998
- 1999 Loveolution, XL Gallery, New York
- 2000 ANP at s&h de Buck, Gallery s&h de Buck, Ghent, Belgium
- 2003 Man in Middle, Deutsche Bank, Eremitage, St. Petersburg, Russia; Lebenslänglich 14, Laura Mars Group, Berlin
- 2004 Seeds and Roots, The Harlem Studio Museum, New York; Emotion Eins, Frankfurt Kunstverein, Kraichtal, Frankfurt
- 2007 Heimat als Utopie, Goethe Institute, Tokyo; Das achte Feld – Geschlechter, Leben und Begehren in der Kunst seit 1960, Museum Ludwig, Cologne
- 2008 Just Different!, Cobra Museum, Amstelveen
- 2009 The End of the Line: Attitudes in Drawing, MIMA Middlesbrough Institute of Modern Art, Bristol, Liverpool, Middlesbrough; Compass in Hand: Selections from The Judith Rothschild Foundation Contemporary Drawings Collection, Museum of Modern Art, New York
- 2010 Wings. Der Flügel in der zeitgenössischen Kunst, Galerie Thaddaeus Ropac, Salzburg
- 2011 Collected, Studio Museum in Harlem, New York; Kompass. Zeichnungen aus dem Museum of Modern Art (MoMA) New York, Martin Gropius Bau, Berlin
- 2012 16th Line, Rostov-on-Don, Russia; Tender Buttons, Galerie September, Berlin
- 2013 Portraitgalerie, Bavarian State Opera, Munich; Weltreise / Kunst aus Deutschland unterwegs, Werke aus dem Kunstbestand des ifa 1949 bis heute, ZKM Museum of New Art, Karlsruhe; Forever Young. Über den Mythos der Jugend, Kunsthalle, Nuremberg; Disaster / The End of Days, Galerie Thaddaeus Ropac, Paris
- 2014 10, Berghain, Berlin
- 2015 Disegno – Zeichenkunst für das 21. Jahrhundert, State Art Collections, Dresden – Print Cabinet, Dresden; Letztes Jahr in Marienbad, Kunsthalle Bremen, Bremen
- 2016 Letztes Jahr in Marienbad, Galerie Rudolfinum, Prague, Czech Republic; The O.P.E.N.- Singapore International Festival of the Arts, Singapore; Linie Line Linea – Contemporary Drawing, Adam Art Gallery, Wellington, New Zealand; Zeichnungsräume, Hamburg Kunsthalle, Hamburg; Zeitgeist-Arte da nova Berlin, CCBB / Goethe Institute, Rio de Janeiro, Brazil
- 2017 German Encounters / Contemporary Masterworks from the Deutsche Bank collection, Qatar Museums, Qatar; Paperfile #13 – oqbo, Raum für Bild Wort Ton, Berlin
- 2018 The world on paper, Palais Populaire, Berlin; Black ist the new Black, Gußglashalle Kreuzberg, Berlin; Erotica, Erotica, Berlin
- 2020 maximal radikal, Brandenburgische Landesmuseum für moderne Kunst, Frankfurt (Oder); Figure Up, BcmA, Berlin; Studio Berlin, Berghain, Berlin; Remember September, Zwinger Galerie, Berlin; Ihr, Kunstraum Potsdam, Potsdam
- 2021 Charta #2 identity and narration, Frontviews, Berlin, Germany; Signature Piece, Städtische Galerie Wolfsburg, Wolfsburg, Germany; Studio Berlin, Berghain, Berlin, Germany
- 2022 Modebilder-Kunstkleider, Berlinische Galerie, Berlin, Germany

== Publications ==
Marc Brandenburg. White Rainbow, 2ème édition, Zeichnungsbuch, vol. 20, published by Maas Media Verlag, 2005, ISBN 978-3-9812127-2-3
