= Oliver Mark =

German photographer (born 1963)

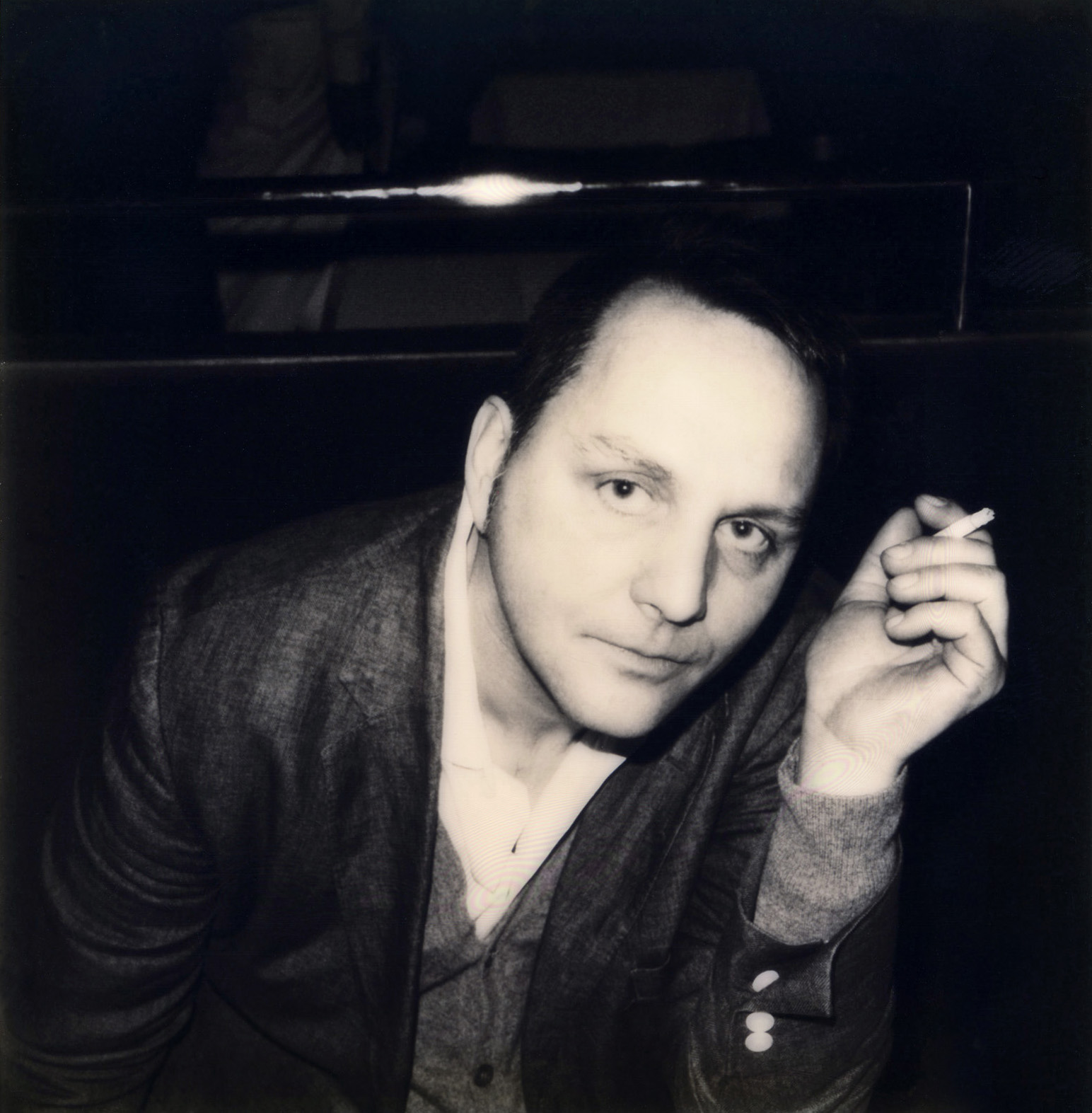
Oliver Mark, Berlin 2013

Oliver Mark (born 20 February 1963 in Gelsenkirchen) is a German photographer and artist. He lives and works in Berlin. His work focuses in particular on portrait photography as well as serial, conceptual projects in the context of fine art.

== Life ==
At the age of nine, Mark received his first camera. The occasion was a trip to the 1972 Olympic Games in Munich, which he had won as a prize in an art competition organized by the Westdeutsche Zeitung newspaper. During this trip, he photographed, among others, the track and field athletes Ulrike Meyfarth and Heide Rosendahl. Mark later described the experience of seeing the developed photographs - which differed significantly from the press images he was familiar with - as formative for his interest in photography as an artistic medium.

After training as a photographer, Mark initially worked in the photo studios of the Burda publishing house in Offenburg and was temporarily active in fashion photography. Since 1992, he has worked as a freelance photographer and artist in Berlin. In the mid-1990s, Mark began creating artist portraits. Among his earliest are portraits of A. R. Penck (1994), Emil Schumacher (1995), as well as Jenny Holzer and Louise Bourgeois (1996).

Mark's work has been published in numerous magazines and newspapers, including Architectural Digest, Der Spiegel, Die Zeit, Les Inrockuptibles, Rolling Stone, Stern, Süddeutsche Zeitung Magazin, The New York Times, The Wall Street Journal, Time, Vanity Fair, Vogue, and Zeit Magazin.

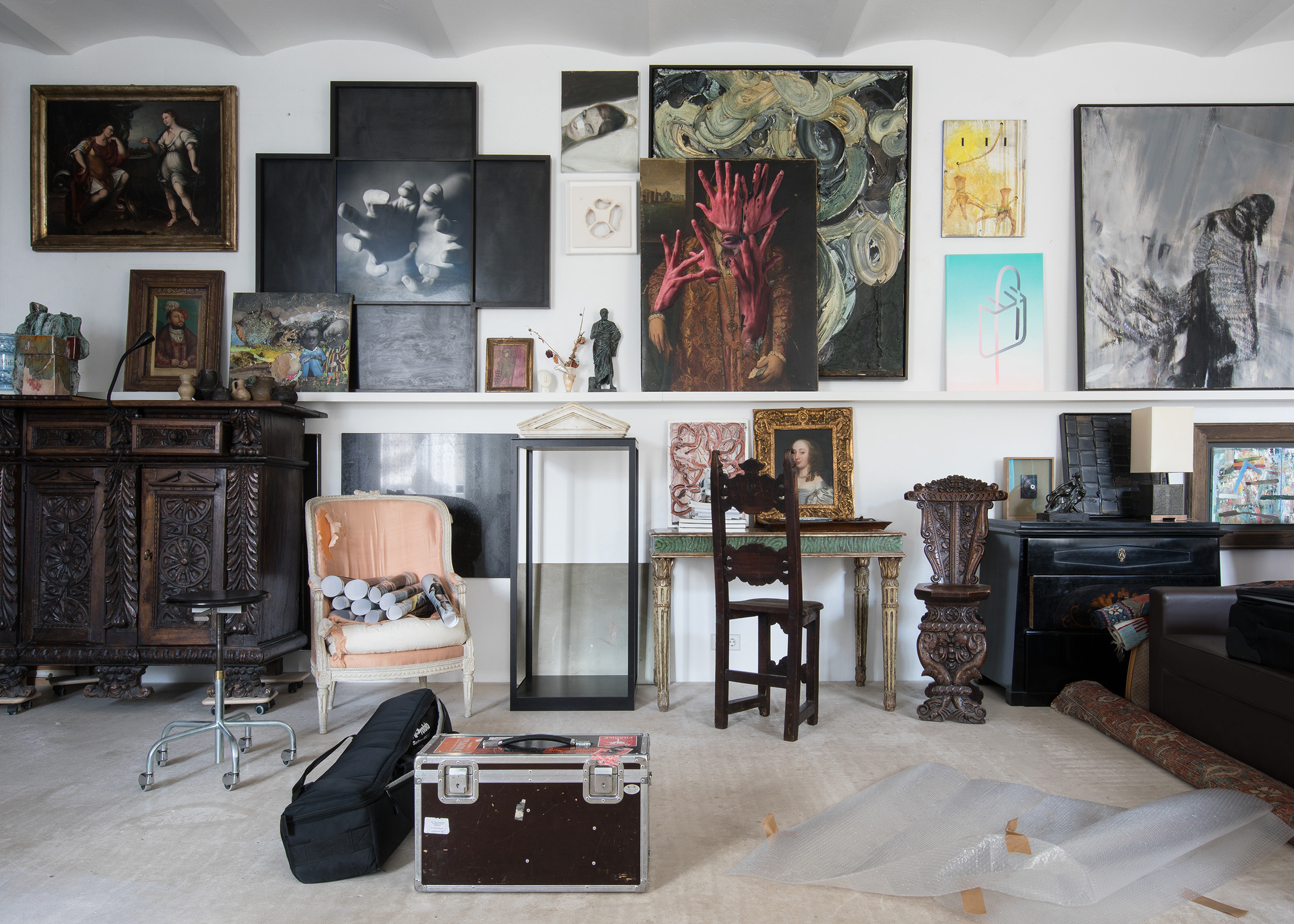
Oliver Mark Studio Berlin, Tempelhofer Ufer 36, 2010 -2022.

Mark attended seminars by Katharina Sieverding (Visual Culture) at the Berlin University of the Arts as a guest student. From 2012 to 2014, he held a teaching position in photography at Hanover University of Applied Sciences and Arts. Between 2010 and 2022, he maintained a studio at Tempelhofer Ufer in Berlin.

== Work ==
Portrait Photography

Since the 1990s, portrait photography has been a central field of work for Oliver Mark. According to his own statements, he has portrayed around 850 personalities from the fields of art, politics, literature, music, and film.

Among those he has portrayed are Anthony Hopkins, Cate Blanchett, Angela Merkel, Pope Benedict XVI, Joachim Gauck, Yoko Ono, Daniel Barenboim, Sean Scully, and Tom Hanks. Mark's portraits are created both on commission and as part of independent projects and have been published internationally and exhibited, among other places, at the National Portrait Gallery London.

Technically, in addition to SLR and medium-format cameras, Mark frequently works with a Polaroid 680 camera.

Group Portraits

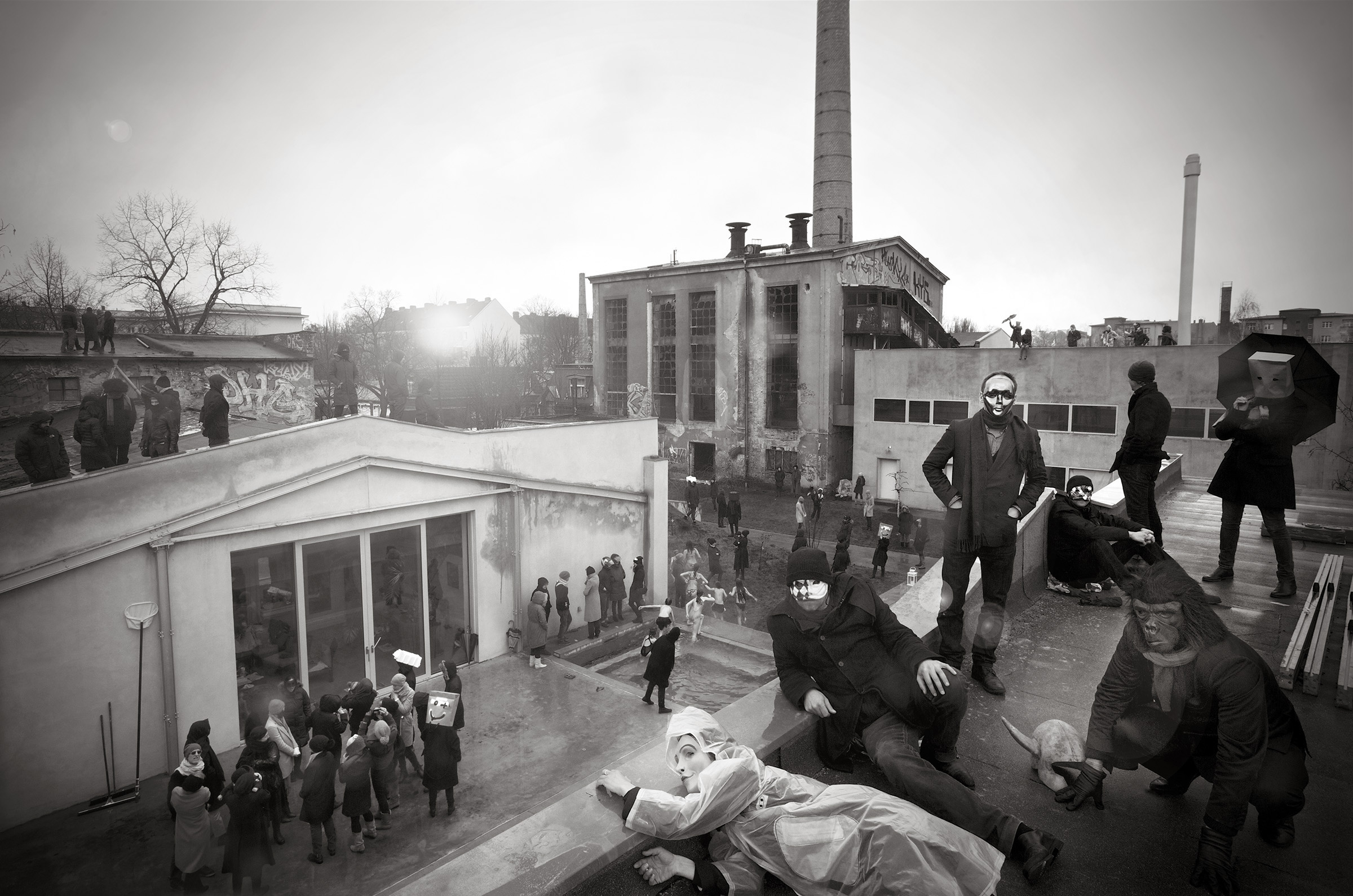
Oliver Mark: Fountain of Youth (2015), gelatin silver print, 68.0 × 100.5 cm.

Parallel to his individual portrait photography, Mark has been intensively engaged with group portraits since the mid-2000s. Notable works include Children in the Garden of Princess Mafalda of Hesse (Rome, 2006) and Nicole Hackert, Jonathan Meese, Gudny Gudmundsdottir, Marc Brandenburg and Bruno Brunnet (Berlin, 2009). For the exhibition Heimat verpflichtet – Märkische Adlige: A Balance of New Beginnings at the Brandenburg State Center for Civic Education in Potsdam (2012/2013), Oliver Mark portrayed twelve returned aristocratic families from various regions of Brandenburg

These works are often created without digital compositing and are generally carefully staged. Mark photographs using a tripod and employs cable or radio remote releases in order to concentrate on the individual expression of the participants within the group.

With the work Fountain of Youth (Berlin, 2015), Mark explicitly refers to the painting of the same name by Lucas Cranach the Elder (1546) and translates its motif into a contemporary photographic context.

Collaborations

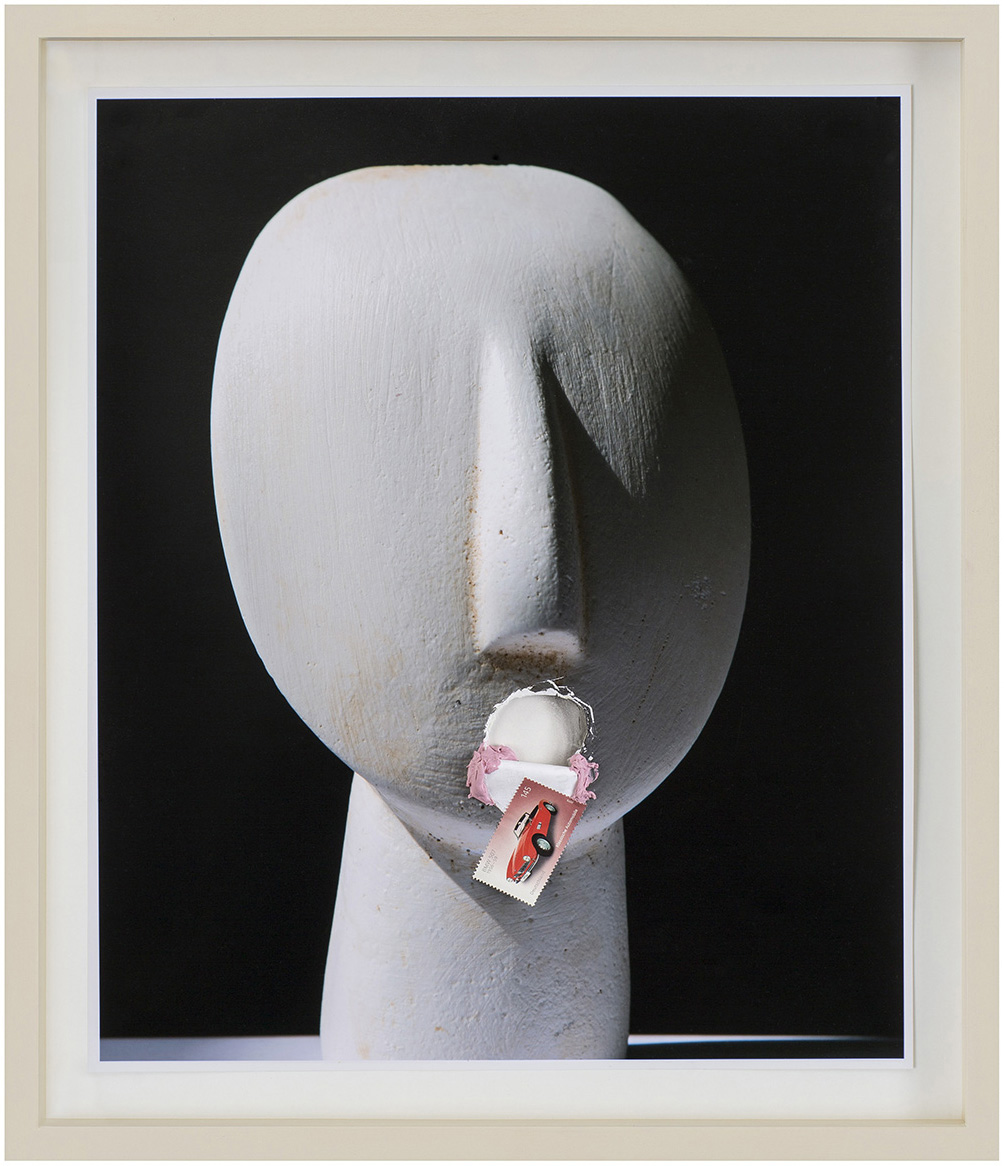
Hoischen / Mark: Letterhead, 36.5 × 42.5 cm, mixed media on color photograph, 2017.

Since 2017, Oliver Mark has realized collaborative projects with other artists. His collaboration with Christian Hoischen formed the starting point.

In 2022, at the invitation of the art commissioner of the Archdiocese of Berlin, Georg Maria Roers SJ, Mark conceived the exhibition Collaborations I for the Guardini Gallery in Berlin. Mark invited 60 artists to use his photographs as source material for their own interventions. The resulting works included overpainting, cutting, collage, and material additions. Two versions of each work were produced - one remained with the participating artists, and one became part of the series.

Both the exhibition and the series address broader questions of authorship, image appropriation, and the boundary between photography and fine art.

Serial Works / Series (Selection)

The long-term project Die Zeit machen wir später aus (We'll Decide the Time Later) (since 1985) documents transitional urban states in Berlin and was developed over several decades, most recently with a focus during the COVID lockdowns in 2020 and 2021.

In The Artist (2013), Mark portrayed the painter Karl Otto Götz in his private environment in 2013. The photographs were exhibited at the Chemnitz Art Collections together with seven poems by Götz and published in the artist's book Aus den Trümmern kriecht das Leben (Life Crawls from the Ruins) (b.frank books, Zurich, 2013).

The publication Außenseiter und Eingeweihter (Outsider and Insider) (2013) (Hatje Cantz, Berlin, 2013), released in conjunction with the exhibition of the same name, brings together 32 Polaroid portraits created without a specific commission. The works are characterized by a spontaneous, intuitive visual language.

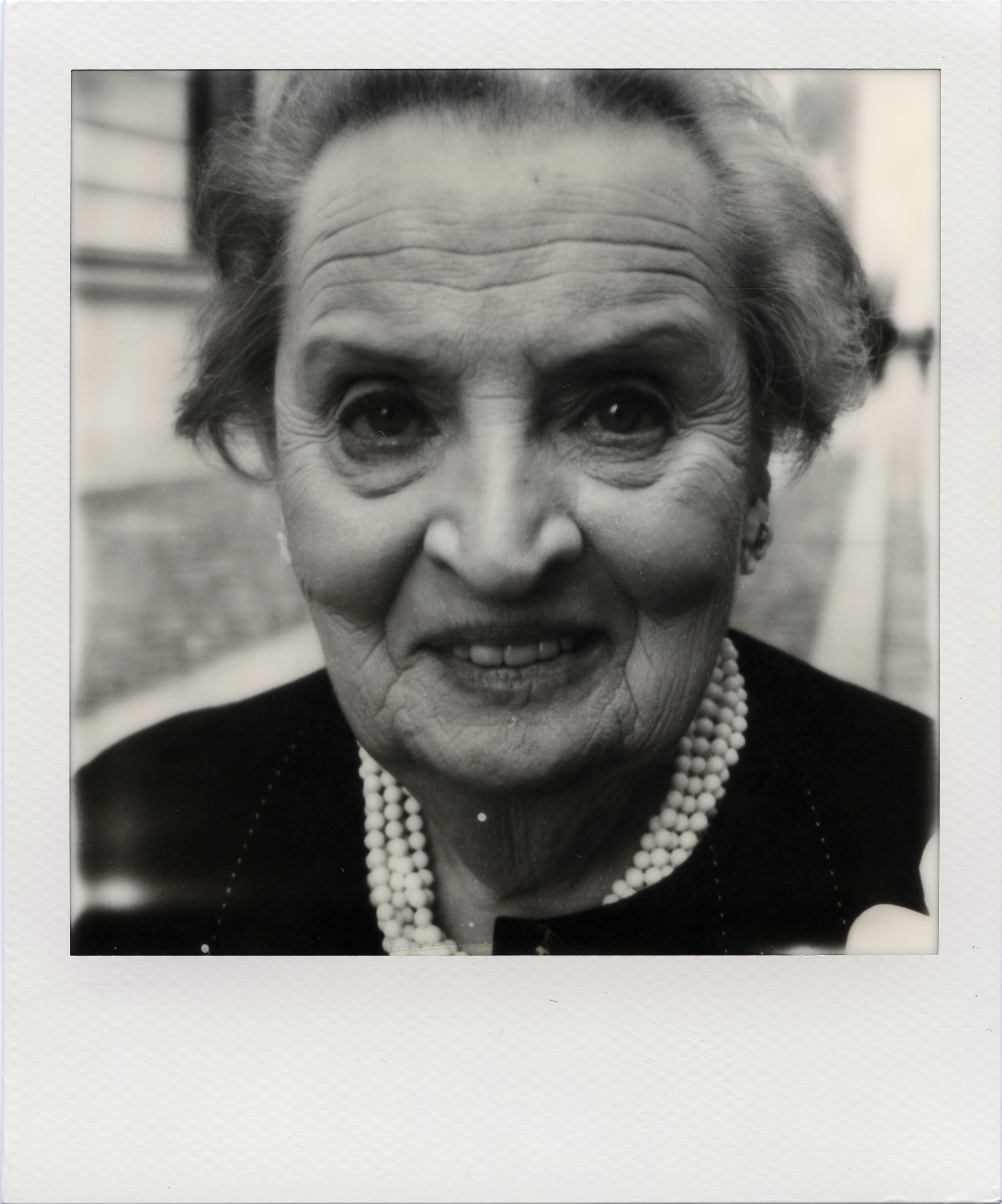
Madeleine Albright, Berlin 2013

"Benedict XVI, who from precisely this perspective seems to grow wings from the high back of his armchair; a nude torso whose punctum is the half-slipped bra cup; the disarming laughter of a urinal snapshot; Madeleine Albright's concentrated energy in passing; Daniel Richter with friends: three self-assured, victorious gazes from the art party world. The brutalist cropping makes the instant photos even more hypnotic. Flaws such as fingerprints and chemical smudges do nothing to diminish their power. These witnesses are endowed with the fleetingness and slight madness of perception - acute, evident, and yet unrepeatable." (Ingeborg Harms)

In the series Natura Morta (2017), Mark photographed confiscated objects from the evidence storage of the German Federal Agency for Nature Conservation in Bonn. Most of the items, originating from the field of species protection, had originally been imported as souvenirs and were seized by customs authorities. The works were shown in 2017 at the Painting Gallery of the Academy of Fine Arts Vienna and at the Natural History Museum Vienna, where they were presented in relation to historical still lifes in painting. Installation views of the exhibition Natura Morta were shown at both institutions in 2017.

During the renovation of the Neue Nationalgalerie in Berlin, a series of 106 photographs titled Neue Nationalgalerie (2020–2021) was created, approaching the reconstruction not as documentary record but as an artistic investigation of space, light, and structure.

The series MUSEO I (2021) was produced in Italian museums and art institutions. Mark photographed from a low perspective and focused on infrastructural elements of exhibition practice, thereby addressing questions of perception and the contextualization of art.

The body of work Ventotene Pictures (2024) was created as part of the IN/SU/LA residency program on the island of Ventotene. The works combine classic gelatin silver prints with painterly and textile interventions.

== Collections ==
Works by Oliver Mark are held, among others, in the collections of the Liechtenstein National Museum, the Chemnitz Art Collections, the Bukovina Museum in Suceava, the Goethe-Institut Dublin, the Würth Collection, Bukovina Museum, Suceava, Romania, as well as in private collections. Some of his portrait photographs have been published under the terms of Creative Commons licenses.

== Exhibitions (selection) ==
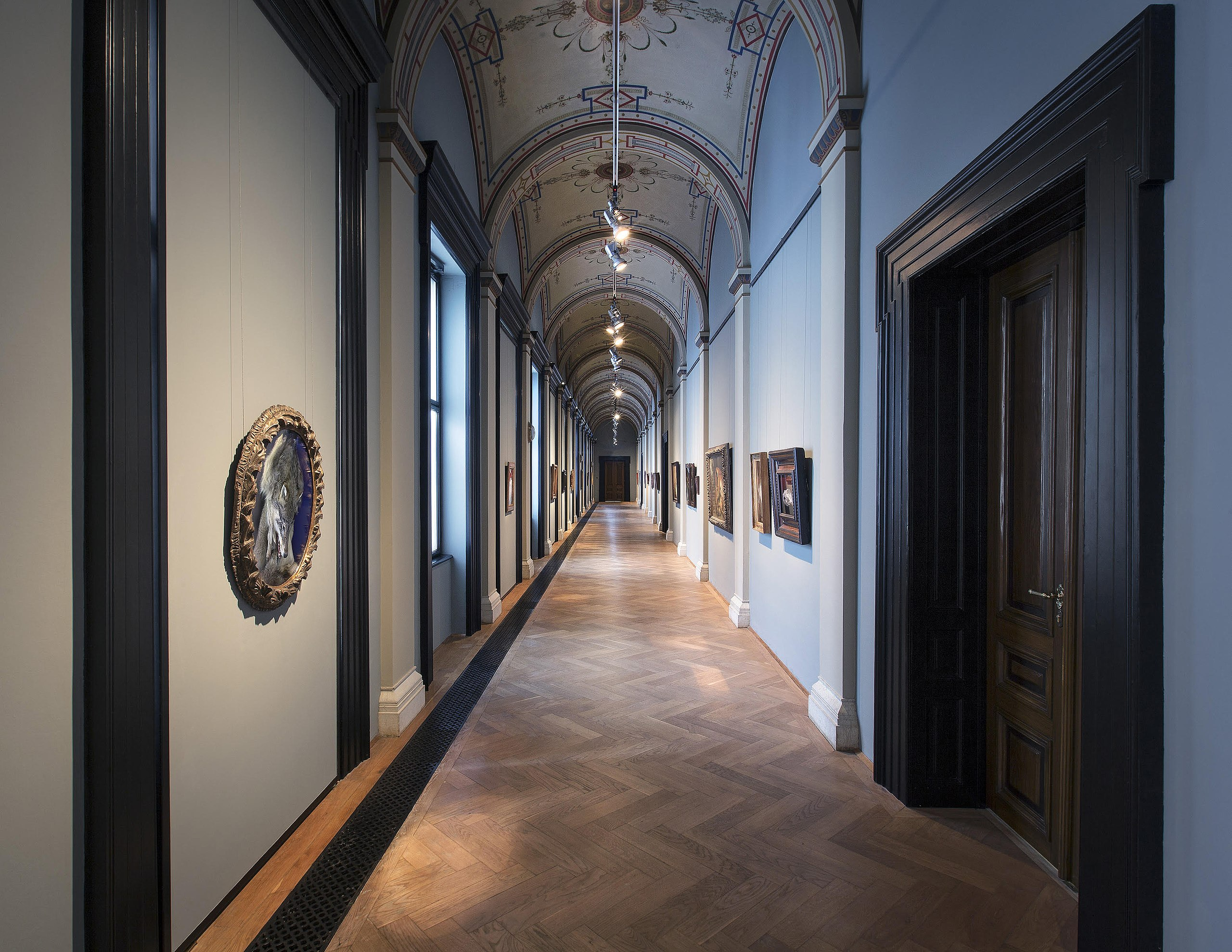
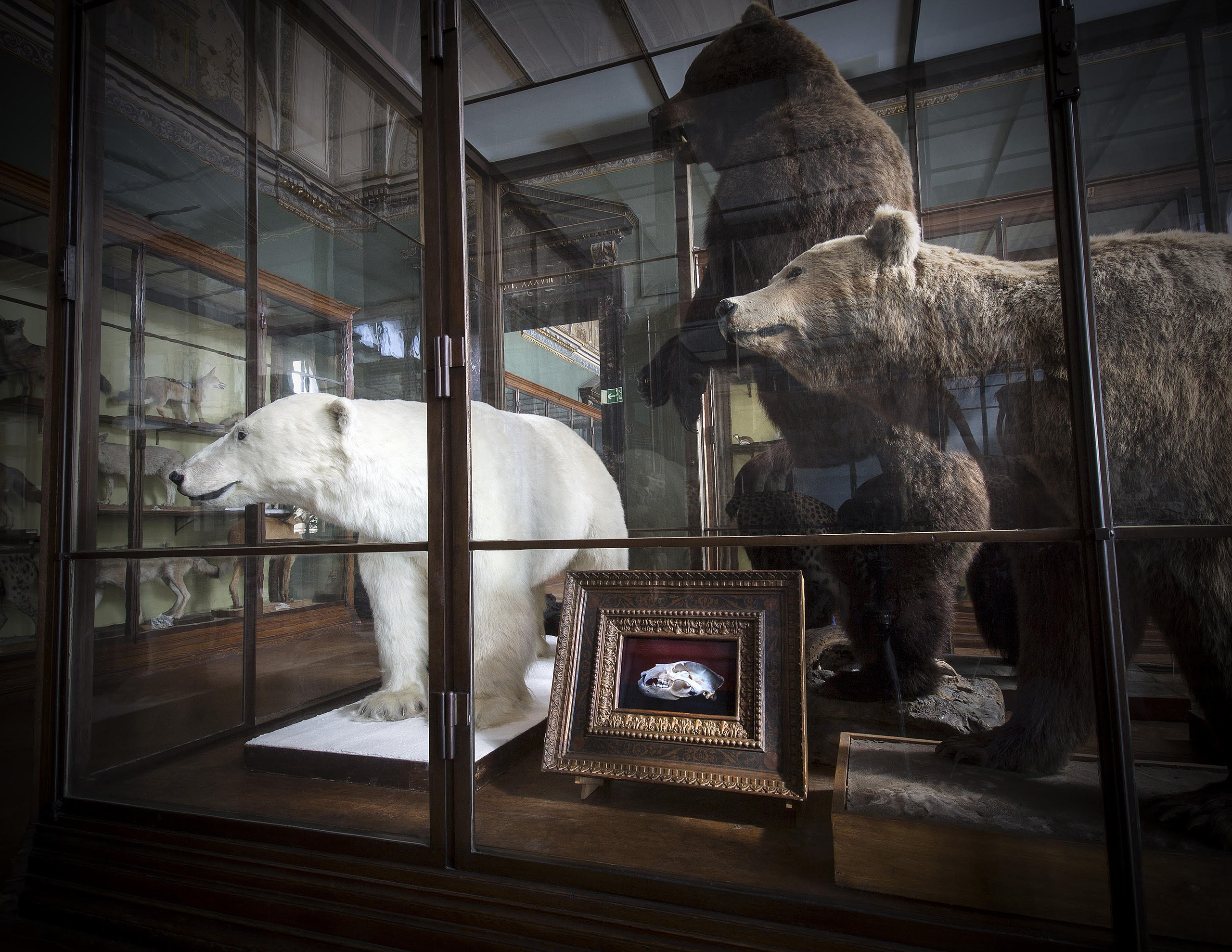
Installation views from the exhibition Natura Morta in the Paintings Gallery of the Academy of Fine Arts Vienna and the Natural History Museum, Vienna, 2017

Oliver Mark's works have been presented internationally in numerous solo and group exhibitions. Important institutional solo exhibitions include still...lesen (2014) at the Goethe-Institut Ireland in Dublin, as well as Aus den Trümmern kriecht das Leben – Porträts von Karl Otto Götz (2014) at the Chemnitz Art Collections.

Mark also gained international attention through the work series Natura Morta, which was shown in 2017 at the Painting Gallery of the Academy of Fine Arts Vienna and at the Natural History Museum Vienna. His works have been featured multiple times at the National Portrait Gallery London, including in 2007/08 and 2013/14 as part of the Taylor Wessing Photographic Portrait Prize.

Other key milestones include the solo exhibition No Show (2019) at Villa Dessauer, Museums of the City of Bamberg; presentations in museum contexts such as the Kunsthalle Würth in Schwäbisch Hall (2024); and participation in international art fairs, including Paris Photo at the Grand Palais. In 2022, Mark conceived the duo exhibition DELIVERY HERO together with Isa Melsheimer at Open Berlin, a project space by Amélie Esterházy. In 2025, he developed the duo exhibition HIERSEIN IST HERRLICH. together with Matthias Bitzer at Galerienhaus Berlin.

=== Solo Exhibitions (selection) ===
- 2021: MUSEO, Kanya Kage Art Space, Berlin
- 2020: Die Hände von Jenny Holzer, at the St. Peter und Paul-Kirche, Potsdam
- 2019/2020: Goldene Schuhe – Photographs from the collection of the Liechtensteinisches Landesmuseum by Oliver Mark, Vaduz
- 2019: No Show, Villa Dessauer – Municipal Museums of Bamberg
- 2019: Bukowina Klöster Leben, Liechtenstein National Museum, Vaduz
- 2018: Bukowina Klöster Leben, Bukovina Museum, Suceava
- 2017: Natura Morta – Photographs by Oliver Mark in correspondence with still life paintings from the collection, Painting Gallery of the Akademie der bildenden Künste Vienna
- 2017: Natura Morta – Photographs by Oliver Mark, Naturhistorisches Museum Wien
- 2016/2017: Natura Morta, Liechtenstein National Museum, Vaduz
- 2014: Oliver Mark – still...lesen, Goethe-Institut Irland, Dublin
- 2014: Aus den Trümmern kriecht das Leben – Portraits of Karl Otto Götz, Art Collections Chemnitz
- 2013/2014: Außenseiter und Eingeweihter, Uno Art Space, Stuttgart
- 2013: Außenseiter und Eingeweihter, pavlov's dog, Berlin
- 2012/2013: Heimat verpflichtet, Brandenburg State Center for Political Education, Potsdam
- 2012: Shuteye, ^{o}CLAIR Gallery, Munich
- 2011: Portraits, New Pfaffenhofen Art Association, Pfaffenhofen an der Ilm
- 2011: 7 Artists and 1 Nude, Galerie Gloria, Berlin
- 2006: Portraits & Stills, Anna Augstein Fine Arts, Berlin

=== Collaborative Exhibitions ===
- 2022: Treshold – Tim Plamper & Oliver Mark, a ^{o}CLAIRbyKahn Exclusive at photo basel
- 2022: Collaborations I, Guardini Stiftung and Galerie Berlin
- 2018: Ein Turm von Unmöglichkeiten – Oliver Mark in collaboration with Christian Hoischen, König Galerie Berlin
- 2018: Der kleine Tod und das pralle Leben (Hoischen & Mark), pavlov's dog, Berlin

=== Duo and Group Exhibitions ===
- 2025: Galerienhaus Berlin, Hiersein ist herrlich. With Matthias Bitzer
- 2025: Paris Photo 2024. Returning to the Grand Palais, ^{o}CLAIRbyKahn Gallery, Paris
- 2022: O P E N Berlin (Amélie Esterházy): Delivery Hero – with Isa Melsheimer, Berlin
- 2018: Ein Turm von Unmöglichkeiten, Salon Hansa at the Glockenturm of Galerie König, Berlin
- 2018: Artist Complex – Photographic Portraits from Baselitz to Warhol, Museum für Fotografie, Berlin
- 2017: KUNST.ORT.KINO, Kunsthalle Erfurt
- 2017: Eindrücke von Liechtenstein, The Vologda State Museum (Russia)
- 2016/17: In Szene gesetzt. Aus Porträts werden Kleider, Lindenau-Museum Altenburg, Germany
- 2015: photos and postage stamps, Sofia History Museum, Sofia
- 2014: The Taylor Wessing Photographic Portrait Prize, The Wilson – Cheltenham Art Gallery & Museum, Cheltenham
- 2014: The Taylor Wessing Photographic Portrait Prize, The Beaney, City of Canterbury
- 2014: The Taylor Wessing Photographic Portrait Prize, Scottish National Portrait Gallery, Edinburgh
- 2013/14: The Taylor Wessing Photographic Portrait Prize, National Portrait Gallery, London
- 2012: Photographien, ^{o}CLAIR Gallery at ART PARIS, Paris
- 2007/08: Photographic Portrait Prize, National Portrait Gallery, London
- 2006: BFF Exhibition, International Photography Festival, Xining (China)

=== Curated Exhibitions ===
- 2019: small, Schau Fenster, Berlin
- 2018: Raum XVII, Werkhalle Wiesenburg, Berlin
- 2017: Alles oder Immer, Schau Fenster, Berlin
- 2012: Der arge Weg der Erkenntnis, Gloria, Berlin

== Awards and scholarships (selection) ==
- 2007 National Portrait Gallery London, The Photographic Portrait Prize, longlist
- 2013/14 National Portrait Gallery London, The Taylor Wessing Photographic Portrait Prize, longlist
- 2024 Travel grant for the island of Ventotene, IN/SU/LA

== Publications ==
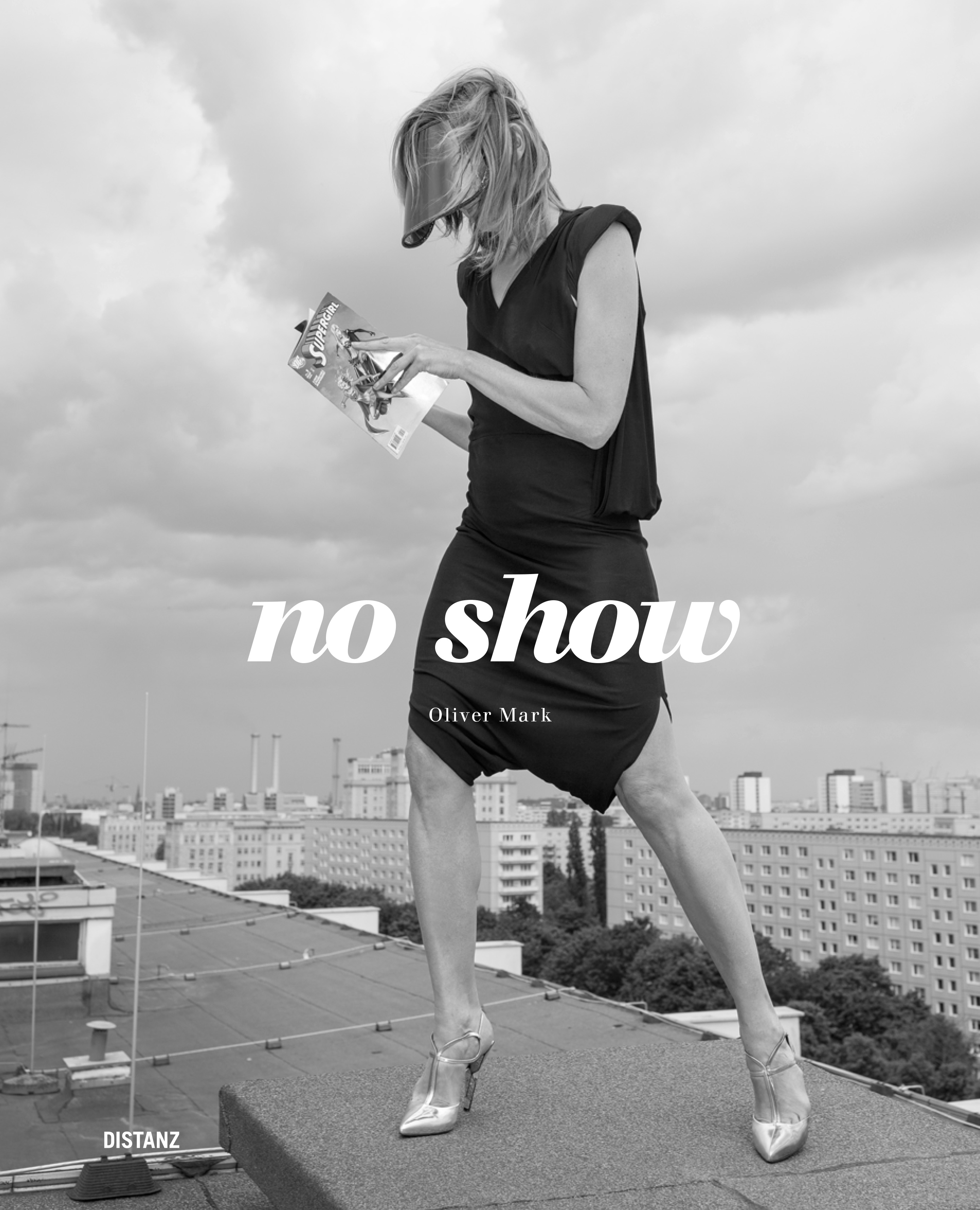
Cover image from no show, Distanz Verlag, Berlin 2019

- Portraits. Hatje Cantz, Berlin 2009, ISBN 978-3-7757-2484-5.
- With Martina Schellhorn: Heimat verpflichtet. Märkische Adlige – eine Bilanz nach 20 Jahren. Brandenburgische Landeszentrale für politische Bildung, Potsdam 2012, ISBN 978-3-932502-60-6.
- Oliver Marks Blick auf Liechtensteins Staatsfeiertag. Alpenland, Schaan 2013, ISBN 978-3-905437-34-8.
- Außenseiter und Eingeweihter. [Outsider and Insider] Hatje Cantz, Berlin 2013, ISBN 978-3-7757-3756-2.
- Aus den Trümmern kriecht das Leben. [From the rubble crawls life] b.frank books, Zürich 2013, ISBN 978-3-906217-00-0. (with poems by K. O. Götz)
- Oliver – Nutte Künstler Fotograf. Die ganze Wahrheit über Oliver Mark. [Oliver – hooker artist photographer. The whole truth about Oliver Mark] Grauel, Berlin 2014.
- Natura Morta. Kehrer, Heidelberg 2016, ISBN 978-3-86828-759-2.
  (with texts by Barbara Hendricks, Rainer Vollkommer, Philipp Demandt, Julia M. Nauhaus, Michael Schipper, Aurelia Frick, Christian Köberl, Lorenz Becker)
- Bucovina Monastery Life. Liechtensteinisches Landesmuseum, 2018, ISBN 978-606-8698-29-8. (with texts by Rainer Vollkommer, Constantin-Emil Ursu, Teodor Brădăţanu)
- No Show. Distanz, Berlin 2019, ISBN 978-3-95476-281-1. (with texts by Carolin Hilker-Möll, Christoph Peters, Georg Maria Roers SJ, Michael Schipper)

== Gallery ==
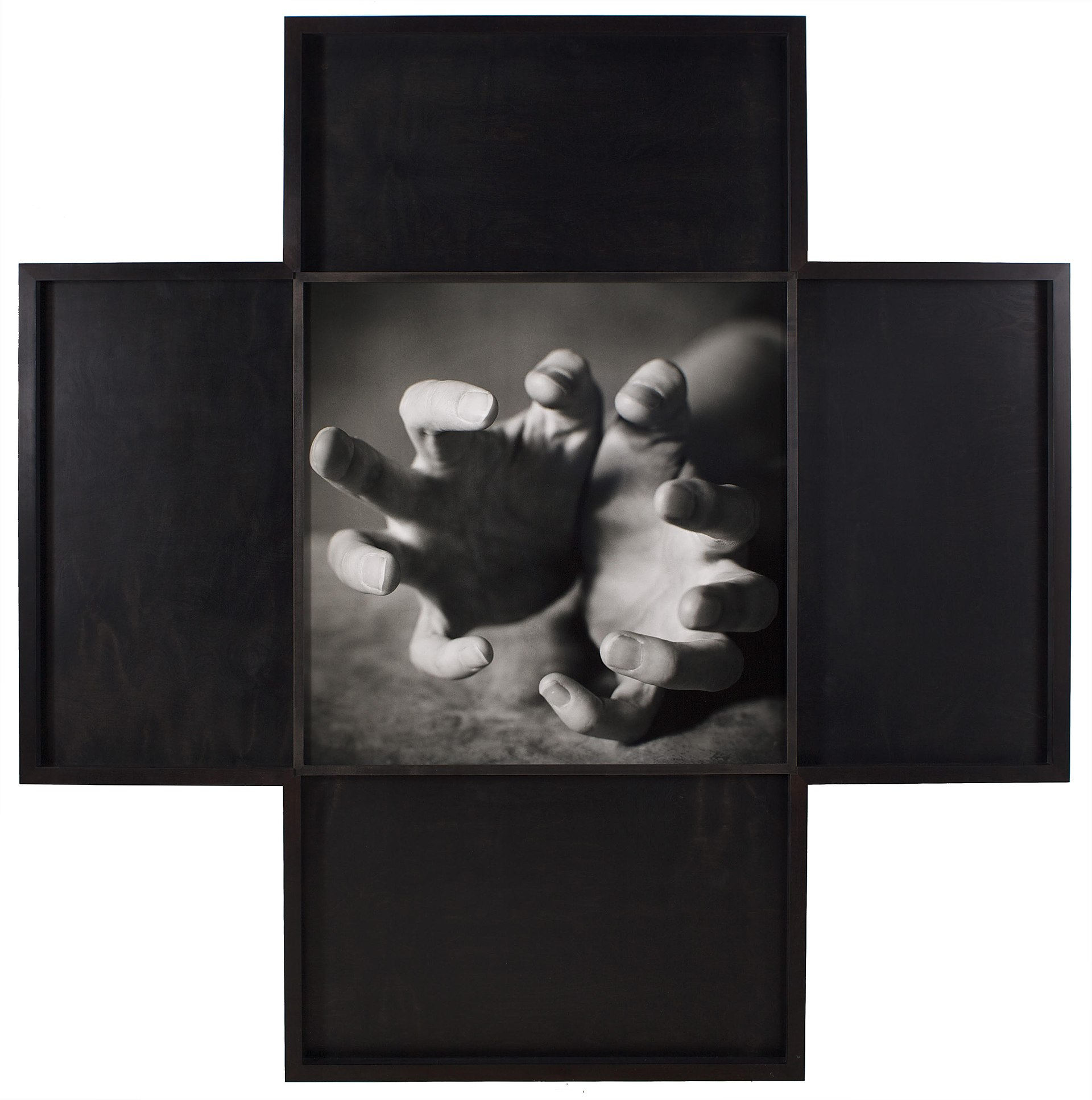
Jenny Holzer's hands, Leipzig 1996. Silver gelatin print on aluminum Dibond, 151 × 154 cm.

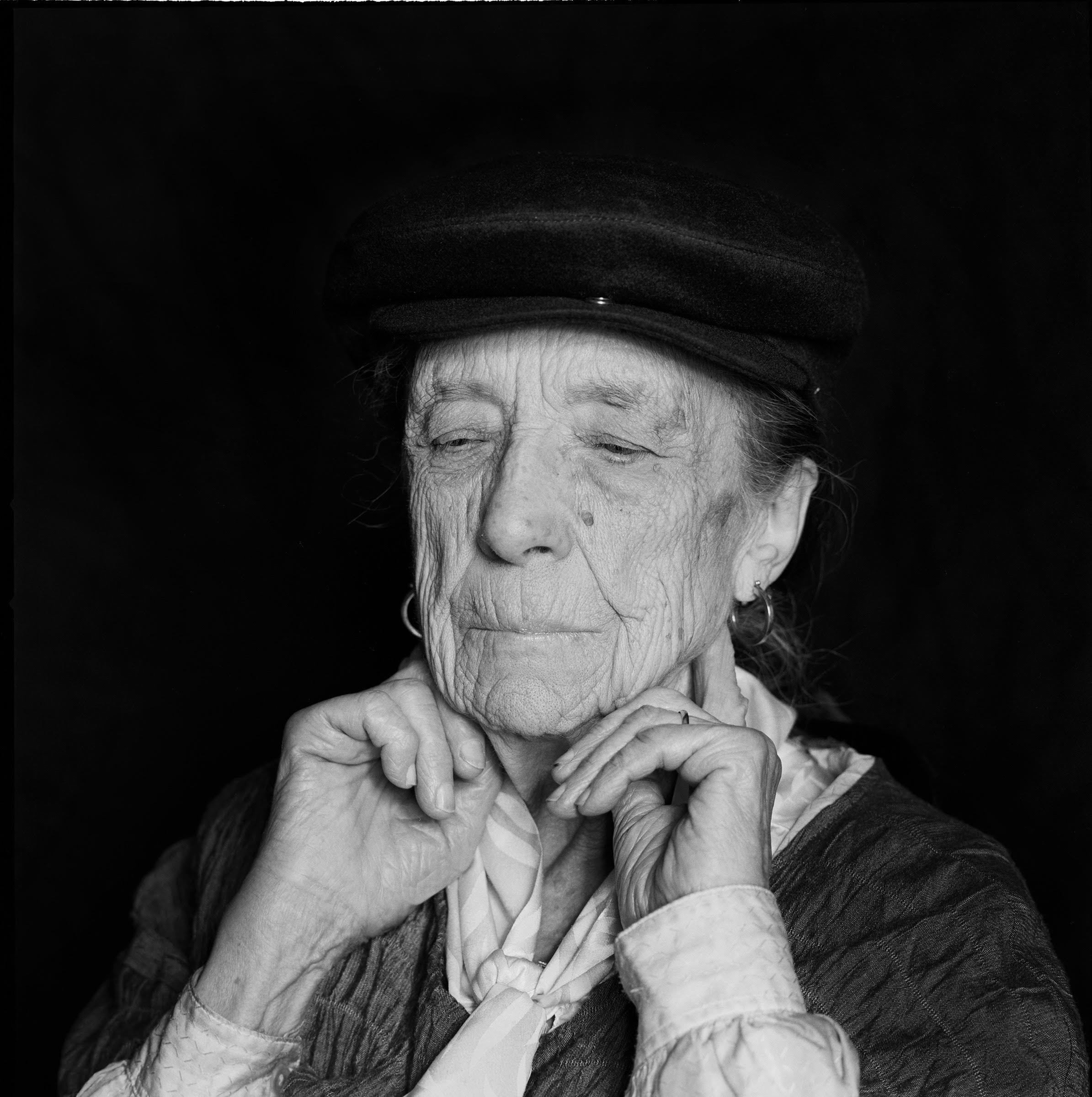
Louise Bourgeois, New York 1996

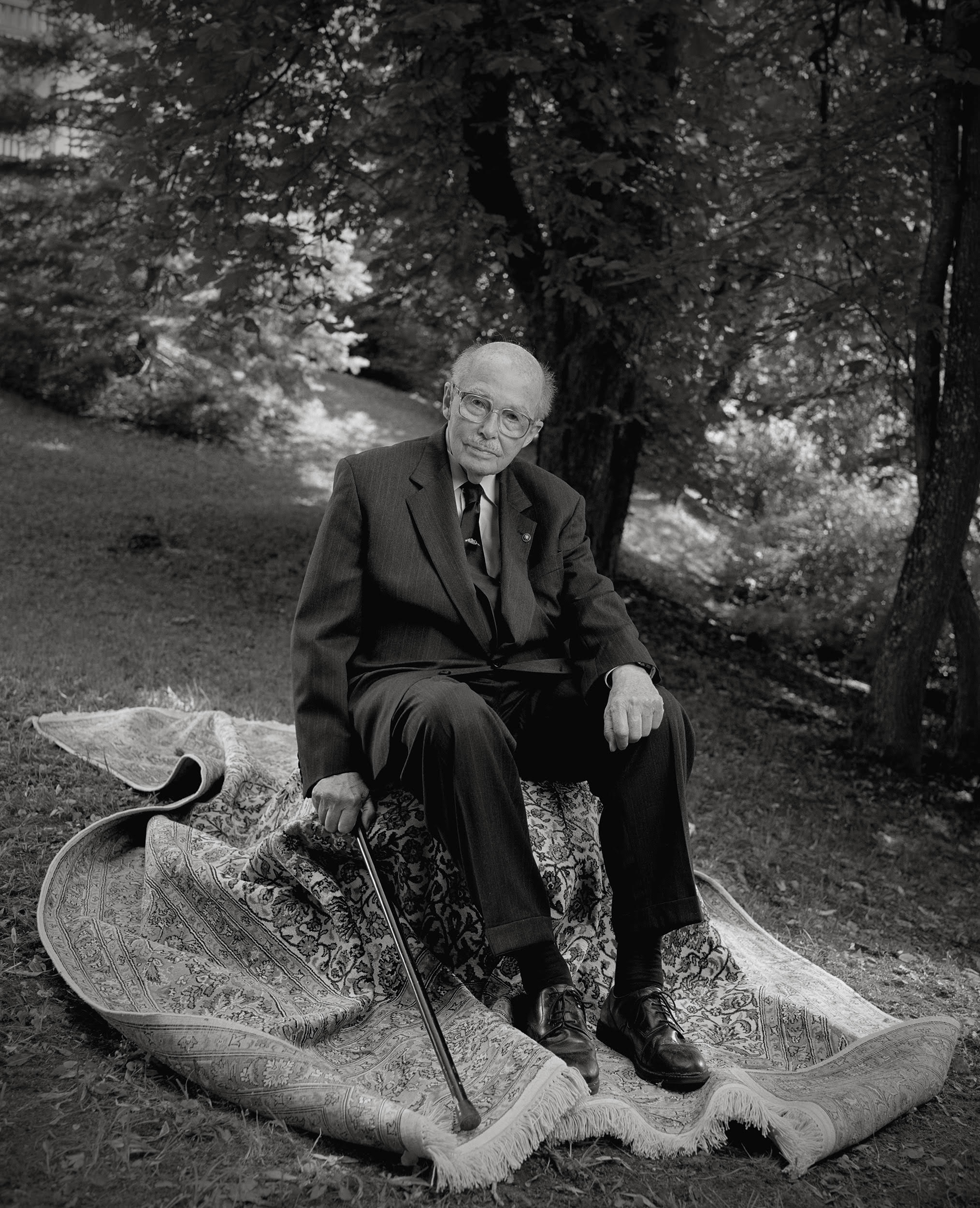
Otto von Habsburg, Pöcking 2006

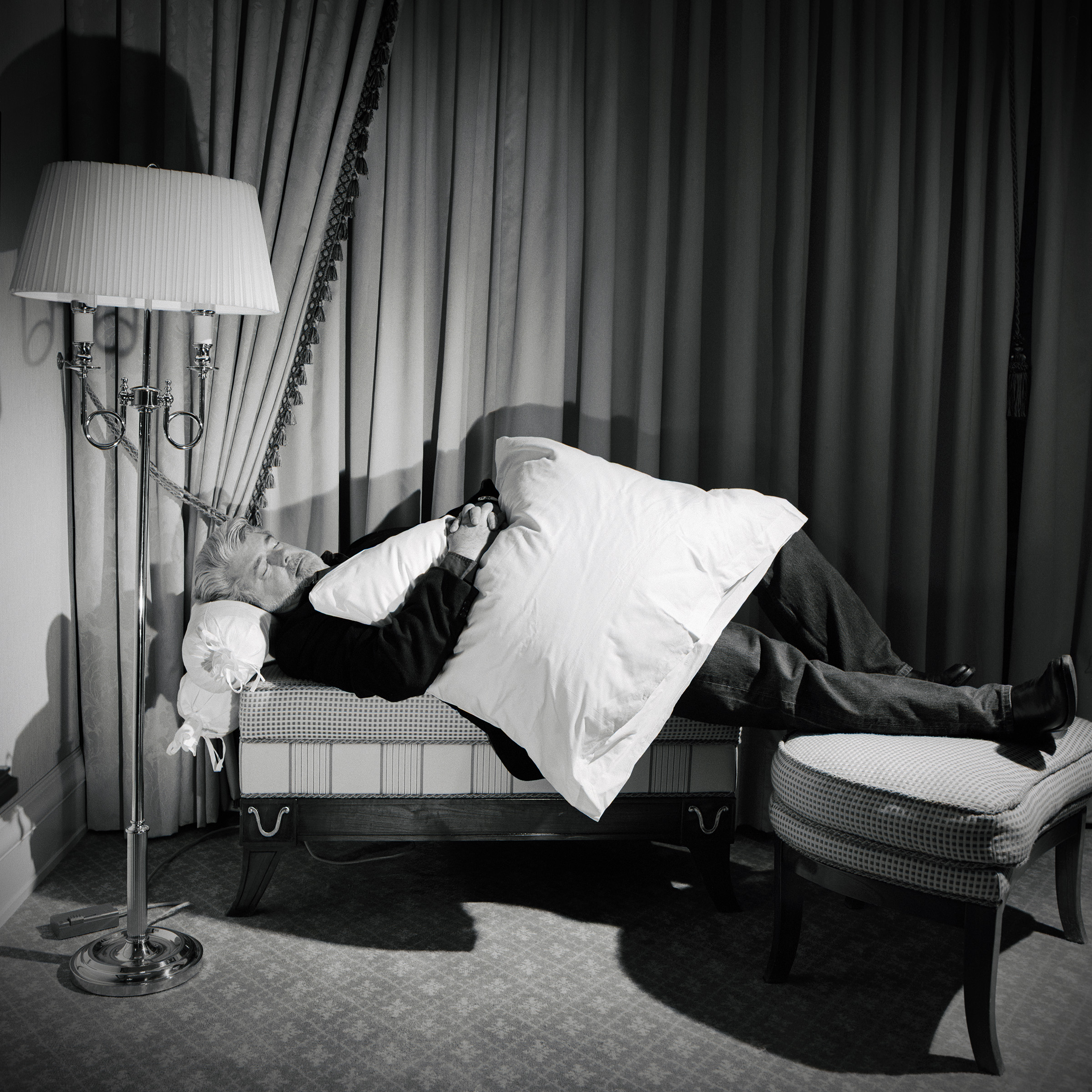
George Lucas, Berlin 2005

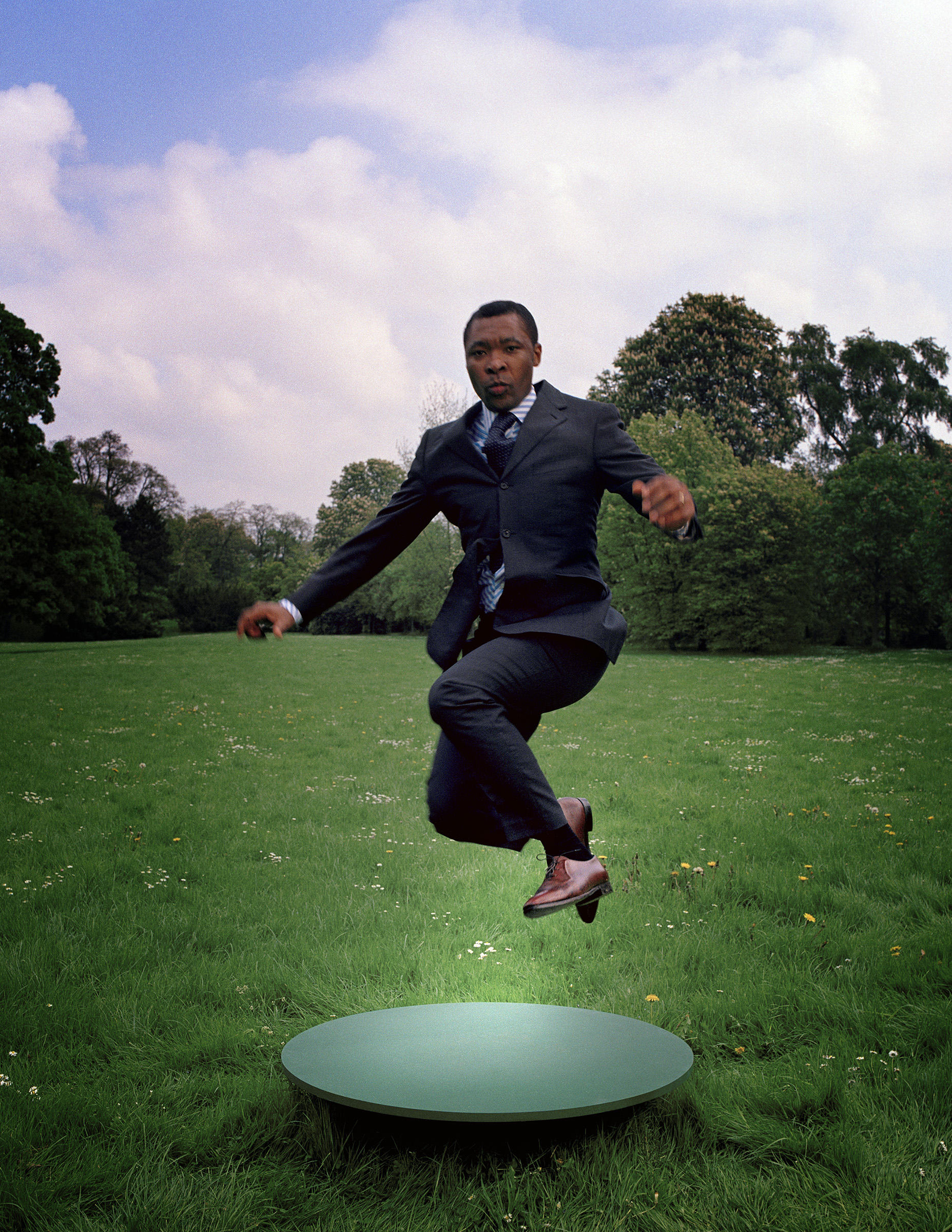
Okwui Enwezor, Kassel 2002

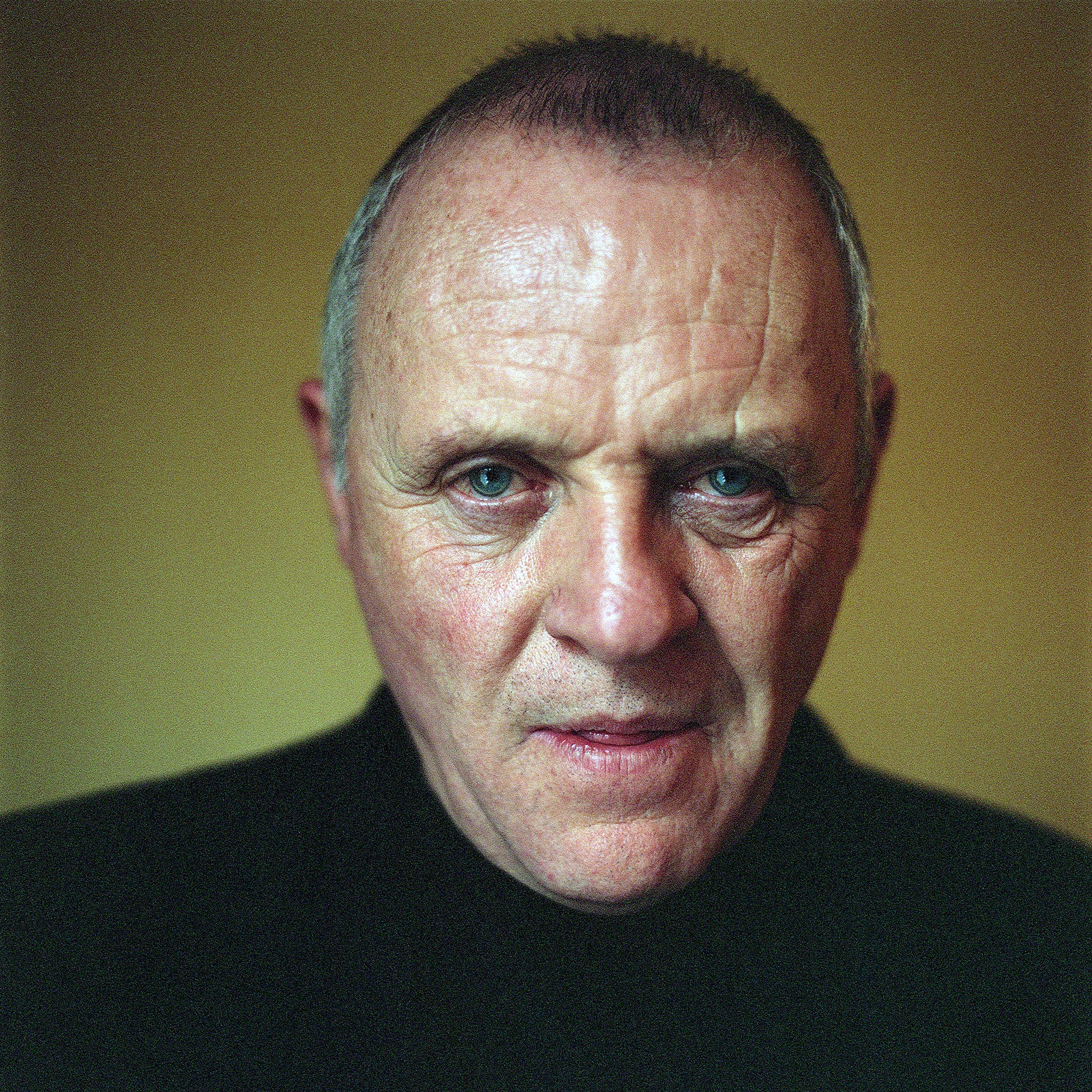
Anthony Hopkins, Berlin 2001

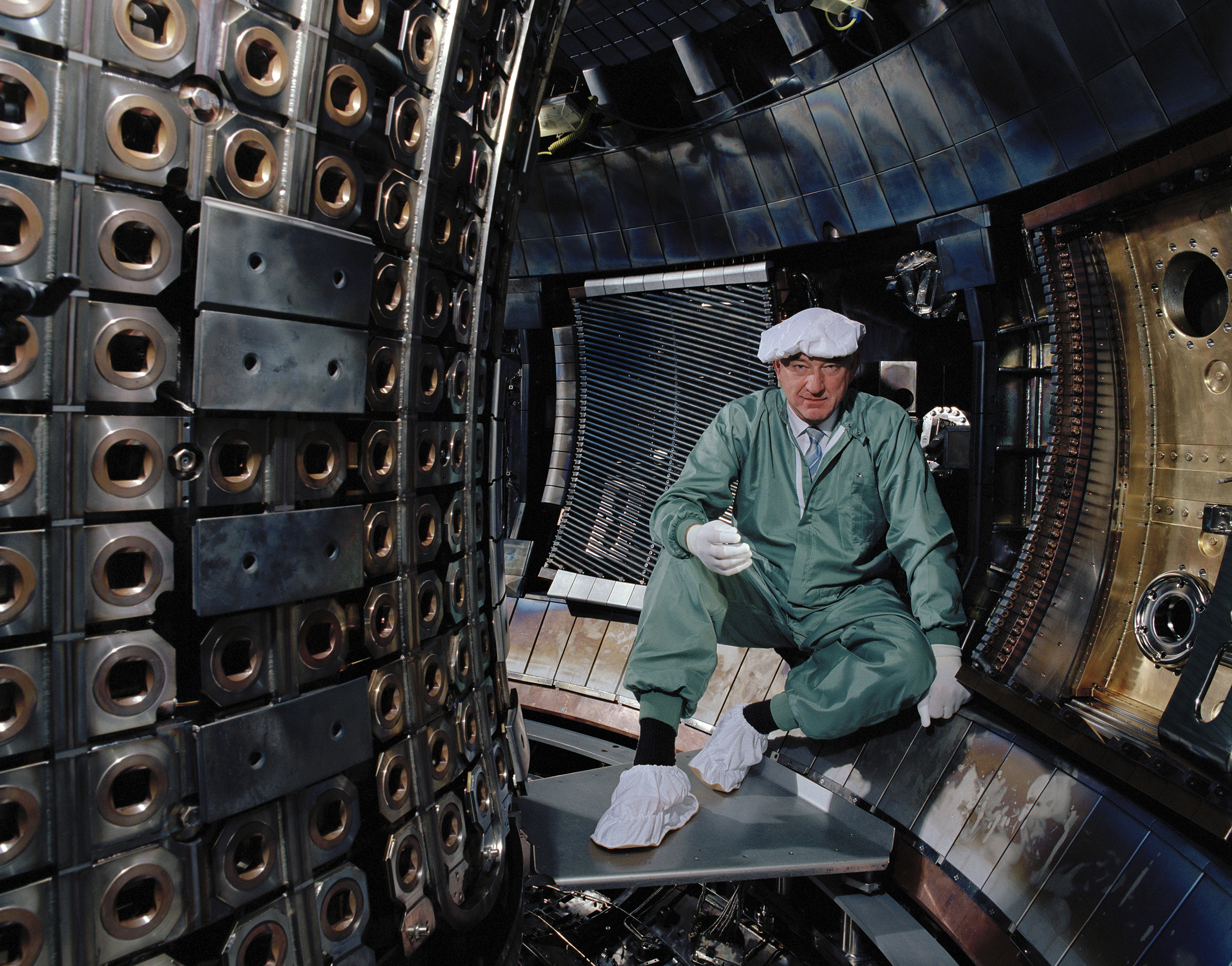
Alexander Bradshaw, Garching 2006

== See also ==
- List of German artists
- List of photographers
- List of people from Berlin
