= Bukovina Museum =

Museum in Suceava, Romania

Coordinates: 47°38′N 26°16′E

- Muzeul Bucovinei
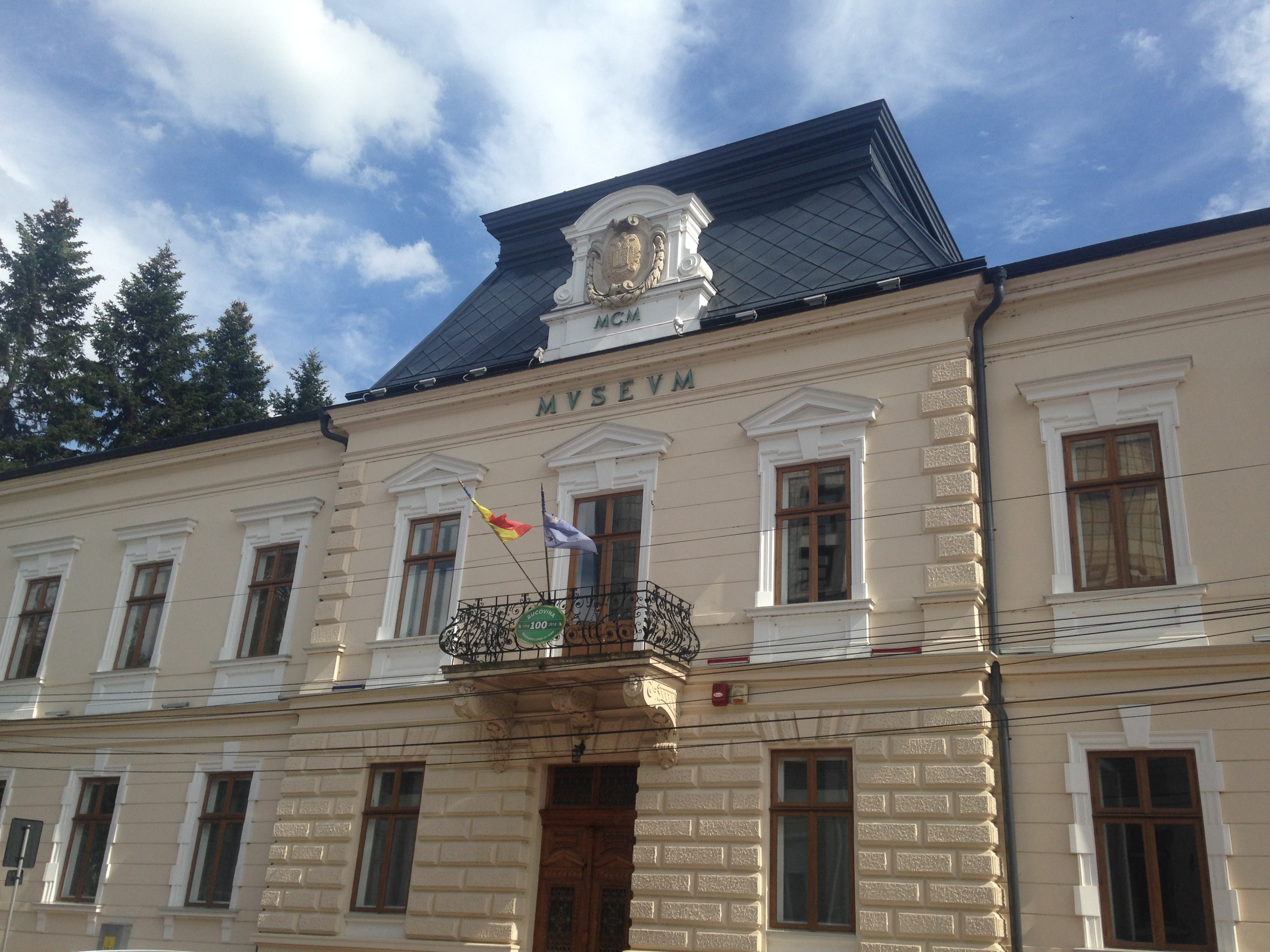
- Former name: Suceava County Museum
- Established: 4 January 1900
- Location: Suceava, Suceava County, Romania
- Website: Official website

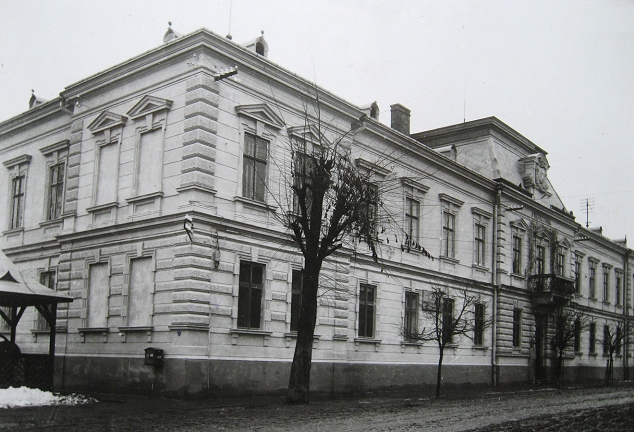
In the interwar period, the building served as prefecture of the district.

The Bukovina Museum (Romanian: Muzeul Bucovinei) is a museum located in the Romanian middle-sized town of Suceava, the seat of Suceava County, named after the historical region of Bukovina (the southern part) which Suceava can be also perceived as a capital cultural of (along with Chernivtsi in the northern part).

The Bukovina Museum consists of several individual museums, objects and memorial houses scattered throughout the region. They pursue their own programs and series of events, but are managed together. The headquarters is located in the History Museum (Romanian: Muzeul de Istorie din Suceava), in the center of Suceava.

The History Museum is the oldest part of the Bukovina Museum and essentially the nucleus around which the complex with its various facilities was built. The History Museum was built in 1898 and is now a cultural heritage site. Additionally, the museum's collection includes photographs by German photographer Oliver Mark.
