= Biesdorf Palace =

- Schloss Biesdorf
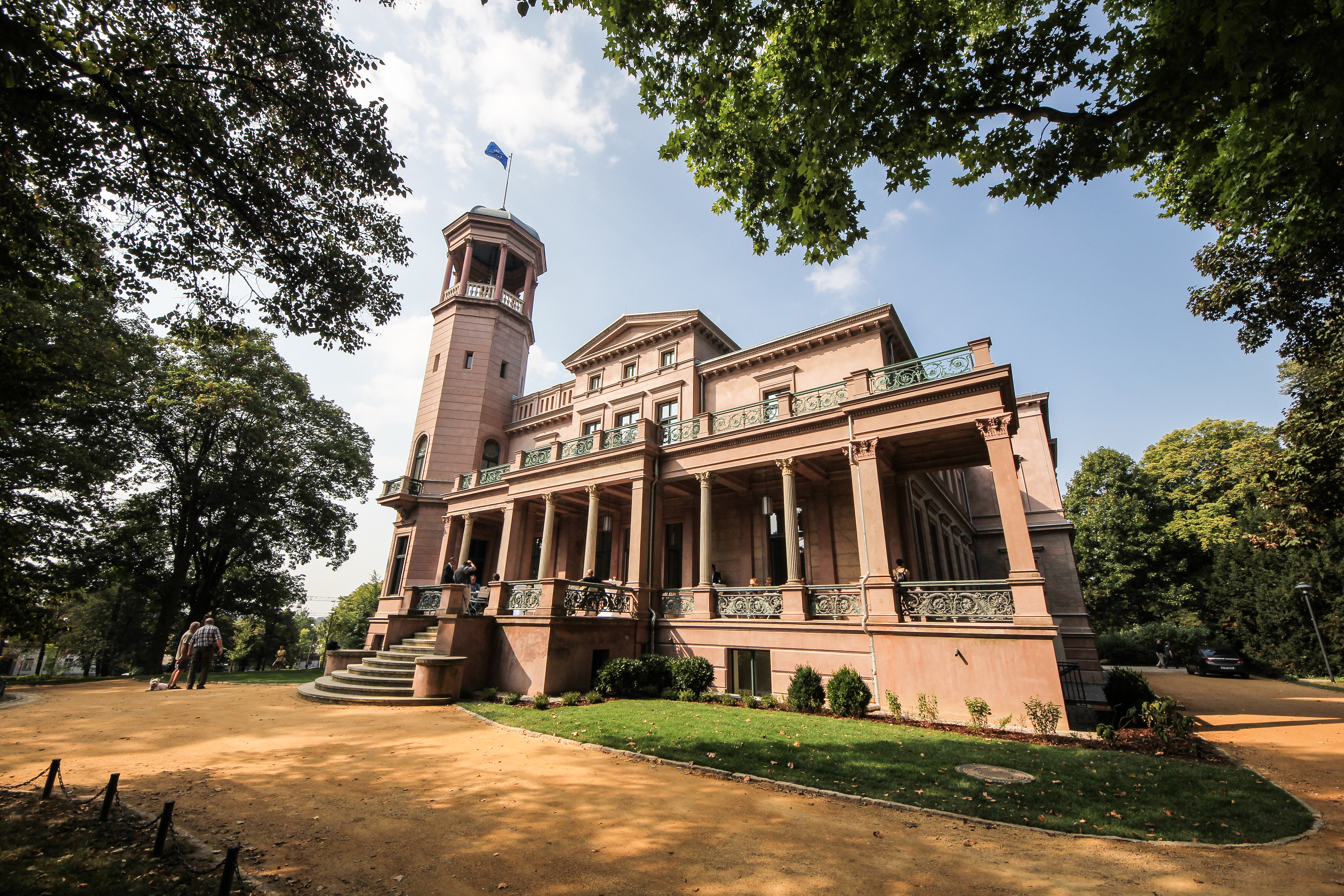
- Biesdorf Palace, 2016

- Location within Berlin Location within Germany

General information
- Type: Palace
- Architectural style: Neoclassical
- Location: Berlin, Germany
- Coordinates: 52.5098°N 13.5577°E
- Construction started: 1868

Design and construction
- Architects: Heino Schmieden, Martin Gropius

The Biesdorf Palace (German: Schloss Biesdorf) is a Neoclassical-style building in Marzahn-Hellersdorf, Berlin. Constructed in 1868, Werner von Siemens acquired the palace in 1887. However, in 1889 he handed the building over to his son, Georg Wilhelm von Siemens. Damaged in World War II, the building was reconstructed on the basis of its original appearance, with the work being completed in 2016.

== Bibliography ==
- Josef Batzhuber. "Schloss und Park Biesdorf, Stadtbezirk Marzahn-Hellersdorf", in Bund Heimat und Umwelt in Deutschland: Weißbuch der historischen Gärten und Parks in den neuen Bundesländern. Bonn: 2005. pp. 29–31.ISBN 3-925374-69-8
