= Claudia Skoda =

Fashion designer

Claudia Skoda (born 1943) is a German knitwear designer and an icon of the Berlin underground scene since the 1970s. She is known for her avant-garde fashion shows as well as for her collaboration with artists and musicians.

Skoda opened her first store in the United States in 1982.
