= Villa Dessauer =

Coordinates: 49°53′27″N 10°53′34″E

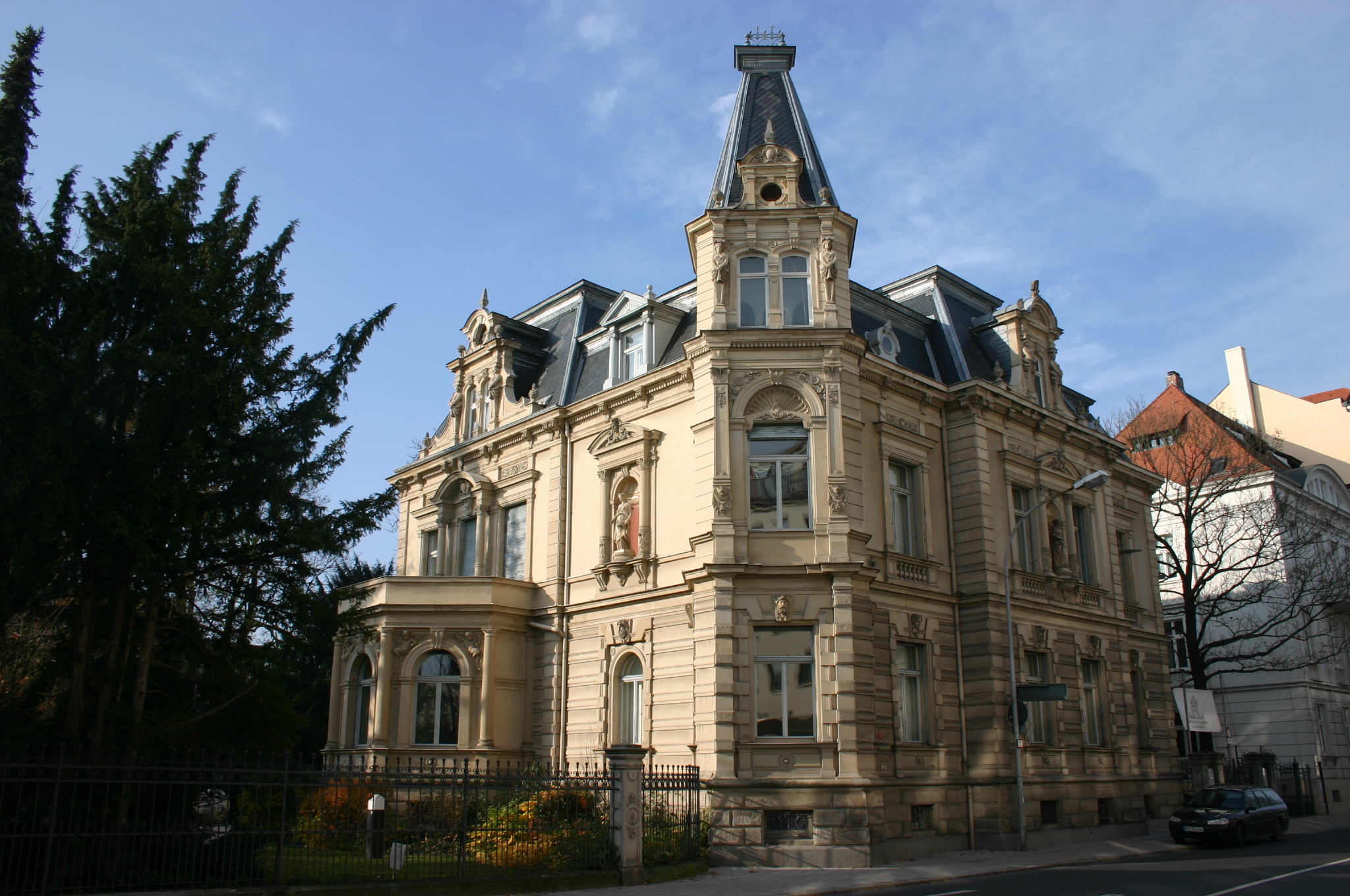
Villa Dessauer.

The Villa Dessauer is a mansion in Bamberg, Germany, which is used as an art gallery by the local City Council.

The edifice was built in 1884 by the Jewish merchant Carl Dessauer.

During the Nazi regime, the villa was confiscated, but after World War II the son of the former owner received his property back and sold it to the City of Bamberg. Since 1987 it hosts a gallery, which is used for several exhibitions, where both local and international artists have the possibility to expose their works.
