= Bjorn Dahlem =

German artist

Björn Dahlem (born 1974) is an artist based in Potsdam.

Dahlem was born in Munich. He studied at the Kunstakademie Düsseldorf from 1994 to 2000. He makes sculptures based on space and astrophysics out of ordinary household materials.

Between 2005 and 2011, Dahlem was a guest professor Berlin University of the Arts (UdK), Nuremberg Academy of Fine Arts, Karlsruhe Academy of Fine Arts and Braunschweig University of Art. Since 2012, he has been a professor for sculpture at the Braunschweig University of Art. Since 2017, he is a professor for sculpture and installation at the Bauhaus-University Weimar

== Selected exhibitions ==
2000

- German Handikraft (with John Bock and René Zeh), Artspace NZ, Auckland, New Zealand

2001

- Neue Modelle, Trafo Gallery, Budapest

2002

- Orgasmodrom, Galleria Giò Marconi, Milan

2003

- Coma Sculptor, Friedrich Petzel Gallery, New York

2004

- Kommando Pfannenkuchen, Daniel Hug Gallery, Los Angeles
- Heimweh, Haunch of Venison, London
- Solaris, UCLA Hammer Museum, Los Angeles
- Lost in Werner, The Modern Institute, Glasgow

2005

- Printemps de Septembre, Festival of Contemporary Images, Toulouse
- S.N.O.W., Galerie Tucci Russo, Turin
- Strange Attractor, Gallery Hiromi Yoshii, Tokyo

2006

- Extension Turn 2, Eastlink Gallery, Shanghai
- The Homunculus Saloon, Engholm Engelhorn Galerie, Vienna
- Busan Biennale, Museum of Modern Art, Busan, South Korea
- Berlin goes Zürich, Arndt & Partner, Zurich

2007

- Gallery Swap (Galerie Guido W. Baudach, Berlin and Hotel, London), Hotel, London
- The Milky Way, Galerie Guido W. Baudach, Berlin
